= WBUF =

Radio station in Buffalo, New York

Coordinates: 42.954°N 78.876°W

- Buffalo, New York; United States
- Broadcast area: Buffalo–Niagara Falls metropolitan area
- Frequency: 92.9 MHz (HD Radio)
- Branding: 92.9 WBUF

Programming
- Format: Mainstream rock
- Subchannels: HD2: Family Life Network
- Affiliations: Compass Media Networks

Ownership
- Owner: Townsquare Media; (Townsquare Media of Buffalo, Inc.)
- Sister stations: WBLK, WTSS, WYRK

History
- First air date: March 4, 1947
- Former call signs: WBNY-FM (1947–1959); WBUF (1959–1980); WFXZ (1980–1981); WFXZ-FM (1981–1982); WBUF (1982–1995); WSJZ (1995–1997); WLCE (1997–1999)
- Call sign meaning: "Buffalo"

Technical information
- Facility ID: 53699
- Class: B
- ERP: 76,000 watts
- HAAT: 195 meters (640 ft)
- Translators: HD2: 95.7 W239BA (Niagara Falls); 100.3 W262CQ (Lockport); 106.1 W291CN (Buffalo)

Links
- Webcast: Listen Live
- Website: wbuf.com

WBUF (92.9 FM) is a commercial radio station licensed to Buffalo, New York. Its studios are located at the Rand Building in downtown Buffalo, with its transmitter on Elmwood Avenue in North Buffalo. WBUF is owned by Townsquare Media and broadcasts a mainstream rock radio format known as "92.9 WBUF, Buffalo's Real Rock".

WBUF began streaming its programming on the Internet in mid-November 2006. The station has a HD 2 subchannel that airs religious programming from Family Life Network. WBUF also uses three FM translator stations: W239BA on 95.7 MHz in Niagara Falls, New York, W262CQ on 100.3 MHz in Lockport, New York and W291CN on 106.1 MHz in Buffalo. These three translators carry the Family Life Network programming by way of the WBUF-HD2 signal.

== Superpower status ==
WBUF is a grandfathered "Superpower" Class B FM radio station, operating at 76,000 watts. Buffalo has three other superpower FM stations: WNED-FM, WDCX-FM and WBKV. Under current U.S. Federal Communications Commission rules, Class B FM's are not allowed to exceed 50,000 watts ERP. Because WBUF signed on in 1947, it was not subject to those restrictions on power. In fact, it once was powered at 92,000 watts, but because it moved its antenna some years ago, it reduced its power.

== History ==
WBUF began broadcasting on March 4, 1947, among the earliest FM stations in Buffalo.

- 1947: WBNY-FM
- 1959: WBUF The Home of the Blended Sound (Beautiful music)
  - WBUF was "The Home of the Blended Sound" as part of The Empire State FM Network which also included WVOR in Rochester, WDDS in Syracuse, and WFLY in Albany/Troy. It acquired the WBUF calls immediately after the closedown of WBUF-TV, the pioneering UHF television station in Buffalo, shut down and transferred its allocation to WNED-TV.
- 1975: (Free-form/progressive)
  - WBUF flipped to this format in 1975 which would last for five years. The format had previously been associated with WPHD in the early 1970s before that station's owner soured on the format, and many of the same personnel worked at WBUF. Program director Bob Allen helped develop the format and would later emerge with a similar format on WUWU in the early 1980s after WBUF (and, subsequently, WZIR in 1980) dropped it.
- 1980: WFXZ Foxy 93
  - In 1980, veteran Buffalo media executive Donald Angelo rebranded the station as WFXZ, "Foxy 93." The short-lived format ended in 1982, after which the station returned to the call sign WBUF.
- 1982: WBUF FM 93 (Adult contemporary/Oldies)
  - In the 1980s, the station featured a popular full service format of adult contemporary and oldies music presented by several well known Western New York on-air personalities including Stan Roberts and Fred Klestine, with its own local news bureau and branded as "FM 93".
- 1991: Mix 92.9 (Adult contemporary)
  - WBUF began this format at noon on April 2, 1991.
  - From early 1991 to 2005, WBUF had a history of short-lived and rapidly changing formats (usually failed attempts to challenge other more dominant stations in the market or adopt fad formats popular in the radio industry for brief periods of time), with the station typically changing formats every two years.
- 1992: B93 (Adult contemporary)
  - WBUF would rebrand to "B93" in 1992.
- 1995: WSJZ Smooth Jazz 92.9
  - This format began on March 30, 1995. The final song on "B93" was "End of the Road" by Boyz II Men, while the first song on "WSJZ" was "Smooth Operator" by Sade. The format lasted two years.
- 1997: WLCE Alice@92.9 (Modern adult contemporary)
  - This format began on April 3, 1997, and was intended to challenge what was then WMJQ (now WBKV) with an edgier, slightly alternative-leaning sound. WTIC-FM morning show (Gary) Craig and Company was syndicated to WLCE, and later WBUF, for its morning show. The format lasted two years.
- 1999: WBUF B92.9, Buffalo's Dancin' Oldies (Rhythmic oldies)
  - This format began at noon on June 23, 1999, and was the third time the WBUF call sign would be used by the station. Using the slogan "Buffalo's Dancin' Oldies", this disco-centric format was positioned to an older audience than urban sister station WBLK and to directly challenge traditionally oldies-formatted WHTT (commercials advertising B92.9 mocked WHTT's music, using "Little Darlin'" by The Diamonds as an example, as music that put a person to sleep). As with other rhythmic oldies stations of the era, the format was short-lived; it lasted two years. Its end was marked with a stunt, playing the song "We Will Rock You" by Queen repeatedly for one day.
- 2001: 92.9 WBUF, Buffalo's Rock Station (Active rock)
  - WBUF began this format at noon on February 23, 2001. The first song was "Abacab" by Genesis. "92.9 WBUF", as it was called, was intended to challenge WGRF and WEDG. WBUF brought the syndicated The Howard Stern Show to Buffalo's morning drive. Later on, the station added Opie and Anthony. A combination of two events held by the duo led to their demise on WBUF. The first was "T'n'A with O&A", a raunchy party hosted by Opie and Anthony in Angola, New York and sponsored by WBUF. However, before any disciplinary action for that incident was taken, the hosts were embroiled in the infamous "Sex for Sam" scandal, where two lovers had sex in St. Patrick's Cathedral in New York City in exchange for Samuel Adams beer. It was the latter event that ultimately led to their first firing. Opie said, "We were well on our way to being fired for the 'T'n'A with O&A' party, when we were canceled for 'Sex for Sam'." Instead of reverting the drive time back to rock, Opie and Anthony was replaced with the all-talk Don and Mike Show.
- 2004: FM Talk (Hot talk)
  - This format was a revival of WWKB's ill-fated "hot talk" format of the mid-1990s. The format was intended to challenge WGR and WBEN, as well as partially replace WNSA. With both drive blocks filled with hot talk hosts, the natural progression was to make WBUF a full-time talk outlet. With the region's best known hot talk host, J. R. Gach, working in Albany and unavailable, Brother Wease, from sister station WCMF in Rochester, was hired to fill the midday, while Tom Leykis and Loveline were given nighttime slots. The format ended after six months due to Wease developing nasal cancer preventing him from working both his Rochester and Buffalo shifts.

Logo as Jack FM, 2005-2020

- 2005: 92.9 Jack FM (Adult hits)
  - On May 16, 2005, WBUF flipped to an adult hits format, branded under the Jack FM name. Stern was the only host retained when CBS Radio, then the station's owner, dropped the talk format, as CBS burned off Stern's contract (their slogan even briefly being "Howard in the morning, playing what we want all day"). It was the first format in about 10 years not intended to directly compete with another station in the market. When Stern left terrestrial radio for Sirius Satellite Radio, he was not replaced on WBUF. Jack FM was, by far, the longest-running format in the station's recent history, lasting 15 years, longer than the previous six formats combined. Subsequent owners of WBUF, Regent Communications and Townsquare Media, continued to license the Jack FM format and did not share the same desire to flip the station's format every few years as previous owners CBS Radio and Infinity Broadcasting had done.
  - Similar to other Jack FM stations, WBUF had no live disc jockeys, carried no syndicated long-form or short-form programming, and carried no time-sensitive information (such as news, weather or sports), only interrupting its music for commercials, pre-recorded one-line jokes and station identification; this format was followed uniformly, 24 hours a day, 7 days a week. At first, 92.9 was one of the only Jack FM stations which didn't use Howard Cogan as the voice of Jack, due to its proximity to Toronto's CJAQ-FM, which identified itself as 92.5 Jack-FM. Using Cogan would have most likely caused confusion with listeners due to the fact the two stations are so close on the FM dial. Until mid-April 2009, WBUF used voice talent Brad Davidorf, best known for his voice work on TBS. At that point, WBUF began using Howard Cogan as its imaging voice. Within two months of Cogan's employment on WBUF, CJAQ-FM dropped the Jack format and went back to the Top 40/CHR format known as "Kiss-FM" that Jack-FM replaced six years earlier.
- 2020: 92.9 WBUF, Everything That Rocks (Mainstream rock/Classic rock)
  - On November 25, 2020 at noon, after briefly stunting with a loop of Christmas music (which ended with "I Saw Mommy Kissing Santa Claus" by John Cougar Mellencamp), WBUF flipped back to a mainstream rock format, branding once more as "92.9 WBUF, Everything That Rocks" and returning to the broad-based rock format the station had featured from 2001 to 2004. The first song under the rock format was "For Those About to Rock (We Salute You)" by AC/DC. The station added the nationally syndicated The Free Beer and Hot Wings Show a few months after launch.
- 2022: 92.9 WBUF, Buffalo's Real Rock (Active rock)
  - From 2020 to 2022, WBUF's playlist leaned toward a classic rock presentation billed as "Everything that Rocks", initially hoping to take advantage of on-air turmoil in the market's heritage classic rock station WGRF. When this was unsuccessful, on June 10, 2022, WBUF shifted its format from mainstream rock to active rock, branded as "92.9 WBUF, Buffalo's Real Rock". The station's airstaff (other than one day part) and presentation did not otherwise change. There had been no major active rock station in Buffalo since WEDG shifted to alternative (itself prompted when previous alternative station WLKK, another station in Buffalo notorious for its frequent format changes, changed format to country music).
