= WTSS (disambiguation) =

WTSS is an FM radio station in Buffalo, New York that operates on 96.1 MHz. It can also refer to:

- WBKV, another Buffalo station that held the WTSS calls from 2000 to 2023 on 102.5 MHz
- West Texas State School, a juvenile detention facility
- Where Time Stood Still, a video game

== See also ==
- WTSS Tower, from which the current WBKV broadcasts
- WLKK-HD2, continuation of the former WTSS (102.5) intellectual property
