= Christmas music radio =

Radio format

Christmas music radio (also known as all-Christmas or festive) is a music radio format devoted to the playing of Christmas music.

Christmas music is a seasonal radio format. Radio stations that adopt the format traditionally carry some other format throughout the majority of the year (most commonly adult contemporary music or contemporary Christian music), then drop that format entirely and switch exclusively to Christmas music for the holiday season. At minimum, the all-Christmas format runs through Advent and Christmas Day, with most stations playing the format for a large portion of November and often continuing more limited Christmas music for the week after Christmas, which will run through to January, in which it shall stop.

The Christmas music radio format has its own core artists and songs, independent of whatever format the station normally runs; most stations mix this core with records more in line with their standard format. In the United States, this core consists of records substantially older than any commonly used radio format, with a large body of records dating to the 1940s through the early 1960s—an era that had otherwise largely been abandoned by mainstream radio formats by the early 2020s—remaining among the format's most popular. Canada and the United Kingdom generally draw upon records from the classic hits eras of the 1970s and 1980s.

== History ==
The roots of the holiday format date to the 1970s, or even as far back as 1966 with the Yule Log television program, but Phoenix, Arizona, was critical to the format's popularization. In 1989, easy listening/adult standards formatted KMEO AM began airing Christmas music from the day after Thanksgiving to Christmas Day, the first local station to do so. KMEO changed formats in 1992; a year later, another local station, KOY (550 AM), revived the format. KOY, like KMEO, was an adult standards station (KOY was affiliated with what was then known as AM Only, now America's Best Music), with KOY's run with the format being a particular success; the core artists of the format at the time overlapped with those that remain popular in the all-Christmas format. Upstart station KTWC made the first attempt to bring the format to the FM dial in 1995, which was not reprised after the station was sold in May 1996. The general manager of KESZ "KEZ", an adult contemporary station in Phoenix, noted that KOY lured away many of KESZ's regular listeners during the holiday season and, in 1996, began programming Christmas music itself. Outside Phoenix, WWYZ in Waterbury, Connecticut, which was and remains a country music station, was reportedly the first to adopt an all-Christmas format in 1998.

Clear Channel Communications purchased KESZ in 1999. By 2000, Clear Channel (later renamed iHeartMedia) had begun testing the all-Christmas format in select markets outside Phoenix; the all-Christmas format reached Orlando, Florida, where WMGF launched an all-Christmas format on November 24. In light of the ratings and revenue increases that Christmas stations saw during and after the holidays, the format went national. In 2001, Clear Channel went all-Christmas at 75 stations, including some new markets like KOST in Los Angeles. Sean Ross of RadioInsight later credited the introduction at KOST as a "format tipping point". Entercom (now Audacy) introduced the all-Christmas format on its adult contemporary stations the same year, including the station then known as WTSS (Star 102.5). The September 11 attacks and subsequent desire for positive, comforting and nostalgic programming was a major inspiration for the introduction of all-Christmas programming in 2001, which included the revival of the Yule Log (by then off-air for over a decade).

== Business rationale ==
Although there is a chance that a station's normal audience may be alienated by a switch to all-Christmas music (adult contemporary, country music, and oldies audiences are generally the most accepting), these risks are outweighed by the increase in ratings that such a shift can attract. There is also a chance that after they return to regular programming, a station may be able to retain some of this expanded audience as new, regular listeners.

"There's no other programming tactic in radio history that consistently delivers ratings increases better than Christmas music. Playing Christmas music is all about having a larger audience after Christmas than you did before. People who find the station often stick around after the holidays and discover a new favorite station."

— Darren Davis, Senior V.P., Clear Channel

Arbitron (now Nielsen Audio) reported in 2011 that it was not uncommon for a station's average audience to double after switching to Christmas music, citing several large-market stations in 2010 such as Boston's WODS, Los Angeles's KOST, New York's WLTW, and San Diego's KYXY. In 2017, Chicago's WLIT-FM roughly quadrupled its audience share between November (2.8) and December (12.4) after making the switch. The practice may not always transition well into financial success, since advertisers do not universally recognize Nielsen's holiday ratings book. In some markets, there may be one dominant broadcaster of Christmas music, but this is not always the case; stations in competitive markets may observe an advantage to being first in their market to adopt the format ("first in wins"), while other stations may change their formats to all-Christmas at the same time as their competitors to negate that advantage.

All-Christmas formats tend to be appealing to advertisers. This is likely because both the high listenership and the potential to place the listeners in the right mindset to want to do their holiday shopping could lead to more products being bought.

== Launch date ==
When all-Christmas formats began in test markets and in the early national rollout in 2000 and 2001, the format flip occurred on Black Friday, mirroring the traditional launch of the Christmas shopping season and the practice of the Phoenix stations. It is not uncommon for some stations to adopt the format prior to Thanksgiving, or even as early as late-October. The practice has been considered an example of Christmas creep.

A handful of American radio stations have, since 2006, earned a reputation for regularly switching to Christmas music on November 1, the day after Halloween. Historically, most stations have typically changed on or around Veterans, Remembrance and Armistice Day on November 11; for example, iHeartMedia used November 10 as the standard launch date for most of its approximately 90 Christmas format flips in 2023. By 2026, iHeartMedia had moved up the changeover at most of its stations to November 6. This mid-November benchmark allows the station to benefit from the ratings bump of flipping to all-Christmas across two months' worth of ratings books while keeping complaints from listeners who are irritated by a too-early change to a minimum. Earlier flips to Christmas music were noted in 2020 (the first station that year, WWIZ in the Mahoning Valley, flipped in late September), as broadcasters sought to alleviate some of the stress brought by the COVID-19 pandemic. SiriusXM, the lone satellite radio service in North America, has used November 2 as its usual changeover date for its approximately 25 holiday-themed channels on its platform.

A sudden reversal of this trend occurred as the pandemic waned in 2022, as no station would adopt the all-Christmas format until October 28—and that station, the lone station to flip before November 1, had largely gone unnoticed until October 30; the trade Web site Radio Insight, which tracks the first-in-the-nation Christmas flips, erroneously stated that "it appears we will make it to Halloween without a radio station already having started playing Christmas music." In general, this later start was also observed in 2023; Radio Insight and Inside Radio both noted that the first station each noticed had changed to Christmas music was WMXL in Lexington, Kentucky, which did so at midnight October 31. (An additional station, WMGA in Kenova, West Virginia, had flipped on October 19, but this change was a stunt tied to the station's upcoming format change after Christmas.) Most outlets stopped tracking who was first in 2024, and Radio Insight counted a pre-acknowledged stunt by WLRS that began October 1 as the first; that year, among non-stunting stations, WLKK-HD2 changed on October 10, while the October 25 change of K252FO (a relay of KKGO-FM-HD2) was the first of an analog signal, and no non-stunting, full-power AM or FM signal was known to make the switch until October 31, when WAKW in Cincinnati, Ohio made the switch. Radio Insight noted that while the creeping of early Christmas flips had largely stopped at October 31, more stations had flipped that day or in the first week of November than in years past. For 2025, the only station to flip permanently for the holiday season prior to Halloween was KLO-FM, which is in the midst of a stunt and a format change. Among non-stunting stations, WAKW was again the first with another October 31 flip. Among commercial stations, WTSS (The New 96.1) in Buffalo and WNOH in the Hampton Roads both changed midnight November 1.

After finding success with its stunt in 2025, and facing tight competition in the adult contemporary format that it chose after said stunt, KLO-FM began airing Christmas music on September 28, 2026, the earliest such non-stunting changeover since 2020. 21 other stations were documented to have adopted the format on or before November 1.

The choice of November 1 has been regularly promoted by Mariah Carey, who regularly releases videos promoting her song "All I Want for Christmas Is You" on the morning of November 1 each year, transitioning from Halloween themes to Christmas settings as Carey declares "It's time!" Carey's song holds a narrow plurality among songs that American Christmas music radio stations use to signal the launch of the all-Christmas format, with five of the 20 stations that had changed before Veterans Day choosing that song and four choosing "It's the Most Wonderful Time of the Year" by Andy Williams (counting all versions of songs, the two are tied, as an additional station chose Johnny Mathis's version of "Most Wonderful...").

The Philippines are a prominent exception. Though the all-Christmas format there is exceptionally rare, radio stations often begin playing Christmas songs within their regular formats as early as September 1; the Filipino Christmas season runs from then throughout all of the "BER months" (the four months that end in -ber). The Jose Mari Chan song "Christmas in Our Hearts" is the traditional launch anthem for the holiday season there. North American and British Christmas records are also popular.

== Programming strategies in North America ==
The typical Christmas music format in the United States carries a mix of approximately 150 recordings, with a heavy focus on vocal adult standards and MOR selections (both formats otherwise being rare on major commercial radio since the early 21st century) from before 1970. Instrumental selections from that era, which generally fall under the beautiful music category, have historically been rarely heard and unpopular.

Rob Lucas, who for 22 years served as music director and morning host for the now-defunct Star 102.5 in Buffalo, New York, used a playlist of over 250 core records during the station's last season in existence in 2022; Lucas also emphasized local artists, new releases and contemporary and/or upbeat selections, as this not only fit Star's regular format but helped play against the all-Christmas format's reputation of being slow and boring.

WLIT-FM, which likewise runs a 250-song core playlist and runs the format for longer than usual (traditionally November 2 to December 25), emphasizes the mid-20th-century standards, especially during the early days and weeks of the all-Christmas format, because its listeners expect more familiarity in the format in that time period when such songs have been off the air for several months. Familiarity is a key aim of the format; Wisconsin programmer Jonathan Little's formula emphasizes the traditional classics, a limit of one novelty song per hour, and a target minimum of 30 minutes between songs by the same artist. Little also discourages stations from trying to introduce newer songs by artists that are either not part of their regular format or have only recently been added to said format.

As many Christmas songs contain themes strongly associated with Christmas Day (such as references to figures such as Santa Claus), and popular observance of the Christmas season often ends after December 25 (in contrast to the traditional Twelve Days of Christmas, which by definition runs until Epiphany on January 6), most stations typically end their all-Christmas programming at some point on December 25 or 26. If a station opts to continue playing Christmas songs beyond the date itself, Lucas advises that these songs be removed from the playlist, noting a substantial number of seasonal winter records still remain playable through the weekend following Christmas, or even through New Year's Day. Listenership to the all-Christmas format remains above the offseason baseline through, on average, two days after the Christmas holiday.

Christmas music stations in Canada tend to follow a similar pattern to those in the United States but with the addition of Canadian content; because of the relative lack of older Christmas music written or recorded in Canada and/or by Canadians, this leads to a more contemporary sound compared to most American stations.

=== Repetition and covers ===
The Christmas music format, unusually among radio formats, relies heavily on cover versions of its songs at its core, causing a particularly high risk of overrepetition and listener burnout, which at its worst can potentially cause psychological harm to those in captive environments (such as retail workers) and breed contempt for the format. Out of the top 500 records playing on the format in November 2025, 84 of them come from five songs:

- "Have Yourself a Merry Little Christmas" (21 artists)
- "Winter Wonderland" (18 artists)
- "Santa Claus Is Comin' to Town" (17 artists)
- "Sleigh Ride" (16 artists)
- "I'll Be Home for Christmas" (11 artists)

This is also complicated by most of the standards having shorter run times than contemporary singles; these older songs (following forms such as the traditional pop 32-bar) may run as short as 95 seconds in extreme cases, compared to the standard of between three and four minutes for most rock era singles. Lucas remarked that "more (Christmas songs) than you think" run longer than three minutes. In the era before broadcast automation and voice-tracking, holiday music lineups were often supplemented by much longer records to allow the disc jockeys to leave the studio; the most famous relic of this era is "Alice's Restaurant," the Arlo Guthrie record that became a Thanksgiving radio tradition, but mainly on rock stations.

Lucas's approach to minimizing such overrepetition incorporated a spacing system that ensured a minimum of a 1 1/2 hours between cover versions of the same song, and two hours between songs by the same artist or collective—this would include similar-sounding but different groups that appear on the same album, such as selections from A Christmas Gift for You from Phil Spector. Lucas's formula relied on approximately 50 power rotation (the most frequently played) records replayed every four hours and most of the rest played two to three times per day. The formula also segregated otherwise unrelated songs into one of eight broader musical categories: religious and spiritual, contemporary pop, classic (for more upbeat traditional records), traditional (similar to classic but for slower records), instrumental, rock, adult contemporary, and novelty; Lucas recommended a minimum 30 to 35 minutes between instrumental and religious/spiritual records (with the exception of Christmas Eve and Christmas Day).

=== Novelty songs ===
Novelty songs, parodies and comedy records pose a particular challenge, as although in small amounts they can receive strong positive feedback, they do not withstand recurrent rotation as well and quickly become tiresome if overrepeated. Lucas strictly limited novelty records to a minimum of three hours between any song in said genre to avoid this, several times more restrictive than other categories, before loosening that to one novelty song per hour by the middle of December. Christian radio formats generally do not play novelties at all, due to their inherent irreverence and their clash with the true meaning of Christmas.

=== Religious songs ===
The period from late afternoon Christmas Eve to noon Christmas Day, Lucas reserved for heavy rotation of religious and spiritual records, as a nod to the solemnity of the holiday. Songs with Christian themes in general tend to be less played than secular Christmas songs (only one predominantly Christian Christmas song, Ray Conniff's "Ring Christmas Bells," ranked among the top 70 records played in December 2024, with the caveat that many of the more familiar Christian songs have several cover versions depressing each version's individual chart ranking); the conventional wisdom approach to religious music has program directors play very little (if any) Christian Christmas music in November before increasing it throughout Advent, with a 2024 survey noting most stations were playing between two and five songs with Christian themes per hour in the second week of December. (An exception to this is on Christian radio formats, which by the nature of their formats carry more religious music throughout the season.) The increase in Christian Christmas song airplay in later December also, as of 2024, has helped bring certain beautiful music orchestras such as Conniff's and Percy Faith's into a slight renaissance.

== Christmas music radio in the British Isles ==
On the British Isles (the United Kingdom, Republic of Ireland and the Crown Dependencies), the festive format has favored more rock music from the 1970s and 1980s, along with occasional inclusion of past hits that reached number one on the holiday ("Christmas number ones") that do not carry a Christmas, holiday, winter or Christian theme; in contrast, the 1940s to early 1960s standards of the American format are less commonly encountered there. These stations also generally carry smaller playlists, with as few as 60 records in rotation.

In Ireland, a temporary radio station named Christmas FM broadcasts on a temporary license in Dublin and Cork from November 28 to December 26, solely playing Christmas music.

In the UK, the Festive Fifty list of songs as voted for by listeners is broadcast starting on Christmas Day, originally by DJ John Peel, and nowadays by Internet radio station Dandelion Radio.

Since the early 2010s, a number of Christmas music stations have broadcast on national and local digital platforms in the United Kingdom, with some also being carried on the FM band. These have included:

- Smooth Christmas, launched by the then-owner of Smooth Radio, Guardian Media Group, on national Digital One DAB in November/December 2011, with the slot used after Christmas by Smooth 70s. The Christmas station returned around the same timeframe of 2012 with this space taken over after Christmas by Bauer Radio station Kiss. Following the acquisition of Smooth by Global and the addition of Capital Xtra to national DAB in October 2013, there was not capacity available for Smooth Christmas to run in 2013, but the service was revived by Global to run in 2014 and 2015 before being superseded by Heart extra Christmas on DAB in subsequent years; the name Smooth Christmas has since been revived as a seasonal pop-up stream within the online Global Player service, playing melodic Christmas hits. Several other streams, such as 'Classic FM Christmas' playing thematically appropriate classical music, have also appeared on Global Player at the relevant time of year.
- Heart extra Christmas / Heart Christmas – Following the launch of national digital station Heart extra in February 2016, Global would annually flip that service to playing continuous Christmas music during November and December of each year. The service broadcast in mono using the older DAB standard in 2016, 2017 and 2018; following the transition of Heart extra to broadcast in stereo using the DAB+format earlier in 2019, Heart extra Christmas ran in that format in 2019. Following the cancellation of Heart extra in favour of Heart UK on national DAB+ in 2020, Heart Christmas ran from October 2020 as a discrete station at the local tier, broadcast in DAB+ in the London area and in standard DAB in a number of other locations, as well as being available nationwide online.
- Pulse Christmas / Signal Christmas / The Wave Christmas – in 2014, Wireless Group (then under the control of UTV Radio) made use of available DAB capacity in three of its FM broadcast areas to launch temporary Christmas stations co-branded with the local FM station names: Pulse Christmas in Bradford/Huddersfield, Signal Christmas in Stoke-on-Trent, and The Wave Christmas in Swansea/southwest Wales. The stations ran annually, appearing each November/December between 2014 and 2019 but ceased thereafter due to the acquisition of Wireless local stations by Bauer Radio in 2019 and the absorption of these services into Bauer's Hits Radio and Greatest Hits Radio in 2020. In addition, in 2016 and 2017, Wireless additionally ran a similar pop-up Christmas music station, Scottish Sun Christmas, on regional DAB in central Scotland.
- Nation Xmas – Nation Broadcasting ran a Christmas station on DAB in several areas of Wales in November/December 2015, and following the festive pop-up these slots were taken by Nation Gold (now Dragon Radio Wales). Nation Xmas became a year-round service after Nation Broadcasting purchased Radio Exe and merged its Radio Exemas service (see below) into it in 2026.
- Magic Christmas / Magic 100% Christmas – Bauer Radio launched this station, a subsidiary of its main Magic station, on national Digital One DAB in late 2017, taking over a slot Bauer had been holding since the summer with Kiss Fresh. (After Christmas this slot was taken up by Absolute Radio 90s, with Kisstory occupying the slot since February 2019.) During December 2018 and 2019, rather than launching a standalone Christmas station Bauer instead flipped the playlist of the main Magic service – available on 105.4 FM in London in addition to broadcasting nationally on DAB – to Christmas music. In 2020, Bauer launched an online Christmas music stream, as Magic 100% Christmas, through its websites and apps in August, before flipping the main Magic service to play principally Christmas music from November 25. In addition, in December 2018, Bauer launched a temporary Christmas music service, Greatest Hits Christmas, broadcast on 105.2 FM in Birmingham and The Black Country during the period leading up to the relaunch of the frequency as Greatest Hits Radio in January 2019; GHC played Christmas music with announcements regarding the impending new station launch, and information for listeners to the service previously carried on 105.2 FM – Absolute Radio – as to how they could regain access to Absolute by retuning to a digital platform. GHC was not itself broadcast on digital services.
- MincePie NonStop – run by UKRD as a sibling service to York FM/DAB station Minster FM, this station was initially an online-only service, being made available on DAB in 2017, 2018 and 2019 but did not return in 2020 due to the acquisition of UKRD's stations by Bauer Radio, with the conversion of Minster FM to Greatest Hits Radio York and North Yorkshire. UKRD also ran a pop-up Christmas station in Cornwall, Pirate Christmas – a sibling to Pirate FM – on DAB in 2018 and 2019, freeing space for this with a reduction in the broadcast bitrate of Pirate FM and its sibling services. Although MincePie NonStop no longer broadcasts, listeners in North Yorkshire were able to access a locally programmed Christmas station on DAB in 2020 with community service YorkMix launching XmasMix on the local digital multiplex.
- Several other smaller services have appeared on individual local DAB platforms in recent times, either popping up as self-contained stations (such as Radio Marsden Christmas, which ran in Surrey in 2015 and 2017) or as a temporary rebranding of an existing regular station (such as Sandgrounder Radio temporarily renaming as 'Santagrounder' on DAB in 2016 and 2017). Radio Exe earned some attention for launching its DAB Christmas service, Radio Exemas, in August 2023.

== Christmas music on satellite and Internet radio ==
Outside of traditional terrestrial radio, satellite radio provider SiriusXM typically devotes multiple channels to different genres of Christmas music during the holiday season. Numerous Internet radio services also offer Christmas music channels, some of them available year-round. Citadel Media produced The Christmas Channel, a syndicated 24-hour radio network, during the holiday season in past years (though in 2010, Citadel instead included Christmas music on its regular Classic Hits network). Music Choice offers nonstop holiday music to its digital cable, cable modem, and mobile phone subscribers between November 1 and New Year's Day on its "Sounds of the Seasons" (traditional), "R&B" (soul), "Tropicales" (Latin), and "Soft Rock" (contemporary) channels, as well as a year-round "All Christmas" channel. DMX provides holiday music as part of its SonicTap music service for digital cable and DirecTV subscribers, as does Dish Network via its in-house Dish CD music channels. Services such as Muzak also distribute Christmas music to retail stores for use as in-store background music during the holidays.

iHeartRadio also has two-year-round stations that are dedicated to Christmas music. One station, iHeart Christmas, focuses on more contemporary holiday music, while the other, iHeart Christmas Classics, offers seasonal music from past decades. Audacy offers an "It's Always Christmas" feed year-round.

== Christmas music as a stunt format ==
Christmas music is a popular stunt format for radio stations, either as a "Christmas in July" promotion, or as a buffer period for transitioning from one format to another.

The end of a calendar year is a common time period for format switches, often following an all-Christmas format (either immediately, or with a second stunt occurring directly afterward). However, the transition itself can still occur before the end of the holiday season, such as the sudden transition of country station KMPS in Seattle to soft adult contemporary KSWD, after briefly playing an all-Christmas format following the merger of CBS Radio and Entercom (its country format had been made redundant by its new sister station KKWF).

Playing Christmas music outside of the holiday season, or otherwise implying that the format is permanent, is a more obvious stunt. In April 2008, the new radio station CFWD-FM in Saskatoon soft launched with an all-Christmas format in preparation for the station's official launch as a top 40 station.

In an extreme case, adult hits station WJSR in Lakeside/Richmond, Virginia maintained a Christmas music format from October 13, 2020, all the way through March 4, 2021, after which it flipped to classic hits; the station had stunted from the beginning of October as "Short Attention Span Radio" (which played shortened snippets of songs) before switching to Christmas music. Ironically, WJSR's sister station in the same market—WURV—had broadcast a 12-hour block of "inappropriately early" Christmas music on October 7, 2015, as a parody of Christmas creep and stations trying to be the first in their market to play Christmas music.
