= WBEN =

WBEN may refer to:

- WBEN (AM), a radio station (930 AM) licensed to Buffalo, New York, United States
- WBEN-FM, an FM radio station (95.7 FM) licensed in Philadelphia, Pennsylvania USA
- WIVB-TV, a television station (channel 4 analog/39 digital) licensed to Buffalo, New York, United States, which used the call sign WBEN from 1948 to 1977
- WBKV, a radio station (102.5 FM) licensed to Buffalo, New York, United States, which used the call sign WBEN-FM from 1946 to 1987
