= John Otto (radio personality) =

American radio personality

John Otto (1929–1999) was a radio talk show host in Buffalo, New York. He began his broadcasting career in the 1940s at the age of 19 at WBNY which has since changed its call sign. He spent most of his radio career doing an evening listener call in show branded Extension 55 at WGR. When WKBW switched from music to talk, he moved to that station doing the same show rebranded as Night Call.

Within two years the station made another format change, which did not include his show. After several months off the air; he returned to WGR. He never retired. When his health deteriorated to the point he was unable to get to the WGR studio; he did his 10 pm to 1 am listener call in show from his home until days before his death. He broadcast his last show on December 3, 1999. He died December 6, 1999, at the age of 70 in Buffalo, New York His death came three months before he would have been out of a job (or possibly forced to move to WBEN), as WGR would flip to sports radio in February 2000.

He was inducted into the Buffalo Broadcasting Hall of Fame in 1998.
