= WTSS =

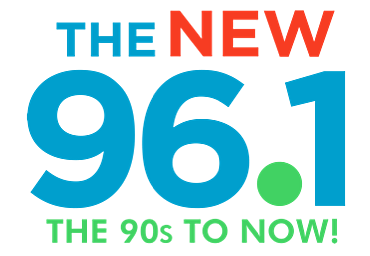
- Buffalo, New York; United States
- Broadcast area: Buffalo metropolitan area
- Frequency: 96.1 MHz (HD Radio)
- Branding: The New 96.1

Programming
- Format: Adult contemporary
- Affiliations: Premiere Networks

Ownership
- Owner: Townsquare Media; (Townsquare Media of Buffalo, Inc.)
- Sister stations: WBLK, WBUF, WYRK

History
- First air date: November 11, 1966
- Former call signs: WDIF (1962–1966); WBNY-FM (1966–1970); WBNY (1970–1979); WJYE (1979–2014); WMSX (2014–2023)
- Call sign meaning: The Star Station (formerly at FM 102.5)

Technical information
- Licensing authority: FCC
- Facility ID: 1915
- Class: B
- ERP: 47,000 watts
- HAAT: 154 meters (505 ft)
- Transmitter coordinates: 42°53′9.6″N 78°52′22.8″W

Links
- Public license information: Public file; LMS
- Webcast: Listen live
- Website: thenew961.com

WTSS (96.1 FM) is a commercial radio station in Buffalo, New York, calling itself The New 96.1. WTSS has an adult contemporary radio format, switching to Christmas music for much of November and December. It is owned by Townsquare Media and has its radio studios in the Rand Building on Lafayette Square in downtown Buffalo.

WTSS has an effective radiated power (ERP) of 47,000 watts. The station's transmitter is on the roof of the Rand Building.

== History ==
=== WBNY-FM, WBNY, and WJYE ===
The station signed on the air on November 11, 1966, as WBNY-FM, a sister station to WJJL (1440 AM) in Niagara Falls. (The WBNY call letters had previously been used on WYSL, and the station is unrelated to today's WBNY, a college radio station at 91.3 FM). At the time, WJJL and WBNY were owned by the Niagara Frontier Broadcasting Corp. On June 1, 1970, the station changed its call sign to WBNY.

In 1973, the station was acquired by McCormick Broadcasting.

=== Adult contemporary ===
In the 1990s, the easy listening format was aging, while most advertisers seek young to middle aged demographics. That prompted WJYE to transition to soft adult contemporary music and eliminate nearly all instrumentals.

In 1995, WJYE abandoned the "Joy 96" branding and began identifying by its call sign WJYE. It returned to the "Joy 96" branding in the late 2000s. In the late 1990s, WJYE was acquired by Infinity Broadcasting, which was later incorporated into CBS Radio.

In the summer of 2000, the syndicated call-in and request show Delilah was added for evenings. Beginning in 2001, it also historically carried an all-Christmas music format from the middle of November to New Year's Day (typically changing formats within hours of its rival on 102.5). Initially the two stations were relatively close to each other in the holiday ratings, with 96.1 winning the ratings battle once.

Lance Diamond was the station's Saturday evening host for much of the 1990s and 2000s. The station began to stream over the Internet in November 2006. Also in 2006, WJYE, along with its Buffalo sister stations, were sold to Regent Broadcasting, which was later renamed Townsquare Media.

Starting in 2007, the station transitioned from its previous soft AC format to a more uptempo adult contemporary format. The station added limited rhythmic songs to the playlist that would be appropriate for the format.

The Joy 96 branding was changed to 96.1 WJYE back in 1993

=== WMSX ===
On September 2, 2014, WJYE changed its call sign to WMSX, and changed its on-air branding to Mix 96. The format itself did not change from that of recent years, although it stopped playing Christmas music up until the 2018 winter season. The nationally syndicated Delilah, which aired on 96.1 for nearly two decades, moved to WECK in January 2016.

On December 25, 2018, after playing Christmas music since mid-November, WMSX rebranded as "96.1 The Breeze". The format shifted to a softer-leaning AC, based on the success of the original KISQ "98.1 The Breeze" in San Francisco. Townsquare described the sound as "modified soft rock", returning to the format the station held before 2007. It also brought back Joe Chille, the station's previous morning host from that era, after he was at WECK for a short time. Chille left the station again to rejoin WECK in October 2021. Delilah's weeknight show returned to 96.1 in February 2019. In contrast to the 2001–2013 run as a Christmas station, the five years of Christmas music on 96.1 from 2018 to 2022 were ratings failures, with 102.5 outdrawing the station by margins of four or five times as many listeners.

WKQW-FM in Oil City, Pennsylvania picked up the Mix 96 brand and logo almost immediately after WMSX abandoned it; in 2022, it moved exclusively online under the ownership of WXMT. In 2026, "The Breeze" would be adopted by Niagara County rimshot WEBR.

=== WTSS ===
In April 2023, rival Buffalo station "Star 102.5" WTSS, owned by Audacy, Inc., was sold to the Educational Media Foundation, a Christian radio company; the new owners planned to flip to Christian Contemporary music as part of the K-Love network. On June 9, 2023, at 10:00 a.m., immediately after the sign off of WTSS, WMSX rebranded as "The New Star 96.1", purporting to be the successor to WTSS. WTSS itself redirected listeners to Audacy sister station 98.5 WKSE, with the two stations simulcasting for a week before the sale closed. Star 102.5's format was shifted after the sale to 107.7 WLKK's HD2 subchannel and continues to stream on the Audacy app.

"The New Star 96.1" shifted to a playlist more in line with WTSS's old format. It also promised to keep playing all Christmas music for much of November and December, as the former WTSS had done. The first song on "The New Star 96.1" was "Can't Stop the Feeling!" by Justin Timberlake.

"The New Star 96.1" kept all of its previous Breeze airstaff, and did not initially hire anyone from WTSS (102.5 weekend jock Mike McQueen, who had previously worked at WJYE before moving to 102.5, eventually moved down the dial to 96.1). Rob Lucas, WTSS' longtime morning host who declined to stay with Audacy, stated he had not been offered any position at WMSX and was considering a number of non-radio positions for his next career. On June 22, WMSX changed its call sign to WTSS. The station dropped the "Star" moniker on October 5, 2023, shifting to "The New 96.1;" Townsquare Media's Buffalo division President Mark Plimpton indicated that "conversations with Audacy" had led to the brand shift while noting he could not comment on those conversations. The new WTSS adopted the former WTSS' standard of changing to Christmas music on November 1 (as the former WTSS had done), but chose a more traditional mix of music choices for its Christmas playlist compared to 102.5. The 2024 Christmas mix included the addition of some country music tracks in addition to the traditional and contemporary pop songs. By 2025, WTSS's traditional midnight November 1 changeover had progressed to being the first commercial non-stunting analog station in the United States to adopt the all-Christmas format (only trailing noncommercial WAKW in Cincinnati, which has historically flipped to the format on Halloween), as no other such station had chosen to change in October.

In 2026 the Christmas Switchover was at 7am EST.

== Previous logos ==
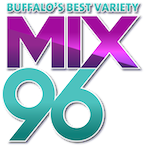
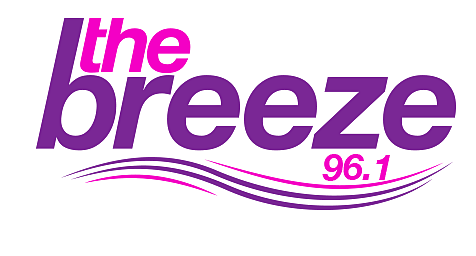
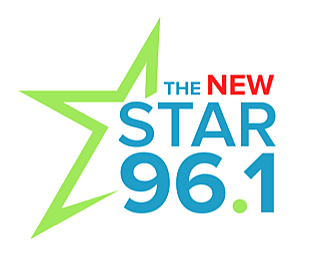
