= WWKB =

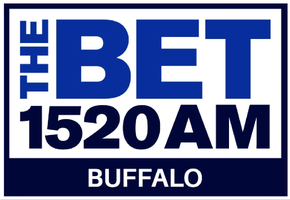
- Buffalo, New York; United States
- Broadcast area: Buffalo–Niagara Falls metropolitan area
- Frequency: 1520 kHz
- Branding: The Bet Buffalo

Programming
- Format: Sports gambling
- Affiliations: BetMGM Network; Buffalo Bandits; Buffalo Bisons; Westwood One Sports

Ownership
- Owner: Audacy, Inc.; (Audacy License, LLC)
- Sister stations: WBEN; WGR; WGR-FM; WKSE; WWWS

History
- First air date: October 22, 1926
- Former call signs: WKBW (1926–1986)
- Former frequencies: 827 kHz (1926–1927); 980 kHz (1927); 1010 kHz (1927); 1380 kHz (1927–1928); 1470 kHz (1928–1930); 1480 kHz (1930–1941)
- Call sign meaning: Variation of WKBW, the station's previous call sign

Technical information
- Licensing authority: FCC
- Facility ID: 34383
- Class: A
- Power: 50,000 watts (unlimited)
- Transmitter coordinates: 42°46′10.21″N 78°50′33.12″W

Links
- Public license information: Public file; LMS
- Webcast: Listen live (via Audacy)
- Website: www.audacy.com/thebetbuffalo

WWKB (1520 kHz) is a commercial AM radio station in Buffalo, New York. It broadcasts a sports gambling format and is one of two sports radio stations owned and operated by Audacy, Inc. in the Buffalo market. WWKB's Buffalo sister station WGR primarily broadcasts local sports programming. The studios are on Corporate Parkway in Amherst, New York. The station used the WKBW callsign from its founding in 1926 until 1986, and during various periods, previously carried pop-rock music and talk radio.

WWKB broadcasts with a power of 50,000 watts, the maximum permitted for AM stations in the U.S. It is one of two 50,000 watt AM stations in Western New York, along with WHAM in Rochester. WWKB is a clear channel station, sharing its Class A status on 1520 kHz with KOKC in Oklahoma City. WWKB uses a directional antenna with a three-tower array. Its transmitter site is shared with WGR on Big Tree Road in Blasdell, New York.

WWKB's primary daytime signal covers all of Western New York, including Rochester, as well as the Southern Tier. It provides secondary coverage to much of Southern Ontario, including Toronto, and can be heard as far east as Kingston.

At night, to mutually protect KOKC from interference, it must direct its signal eastward. Thus, while WWKB can be heard across most of the eastern half of North America at night, its signal is spotty only 20 miles (32 km) southwest of Buffalo. Local residents remain largely unaware that the antenna array is internationally famous for sending WWKB's nighttime signal to Nordic countries on a regular basis. The directional nighttime signal has resulted the station being commonly heard in parts of Finland and Sweden using special DX equipment during winter months. A group of Scandinavian radio reception enthusiasts visited to view, photograph, and measure the transmitter array.

== Programming ==
Most programming comes from the co-owned BetMGM Network, with some shows from Westwood One Sports. Audacy uses WWKB as an overflow station for WGR's sports coverage. When two teams to which WGR owns the rights are playing at the same time, the more important event usually airs on WGR, with the lesser event on WWKB.

=== Sports coverage ===
- National Football League on Westwood One (in season, overflow from WGR when WGR does Bills games)
- Select Buffalo Sabres professional National Hockey League preseason and prospect tournament games
- Buffalo Bandits lacrosse (in season)
- Buffalo Bisons minor league baseball (in season)
- Buffalo Bulls football and basketball (University at Buffalo, beginning 2014)

WWKB's 50,000 watt signal makes it a desirable outlet for the Buffalo's second-tier sports teams: the Buffalo Bandits have aired on the station since the 2006 season (moving from WGR where it took the place of the locked-out Sabres in 2005), Buffalo Bulls football and basketball, and, on and off, the Buffalo Bisons, who moved back to the station in April 2008.

== History ==
=== Early years ===
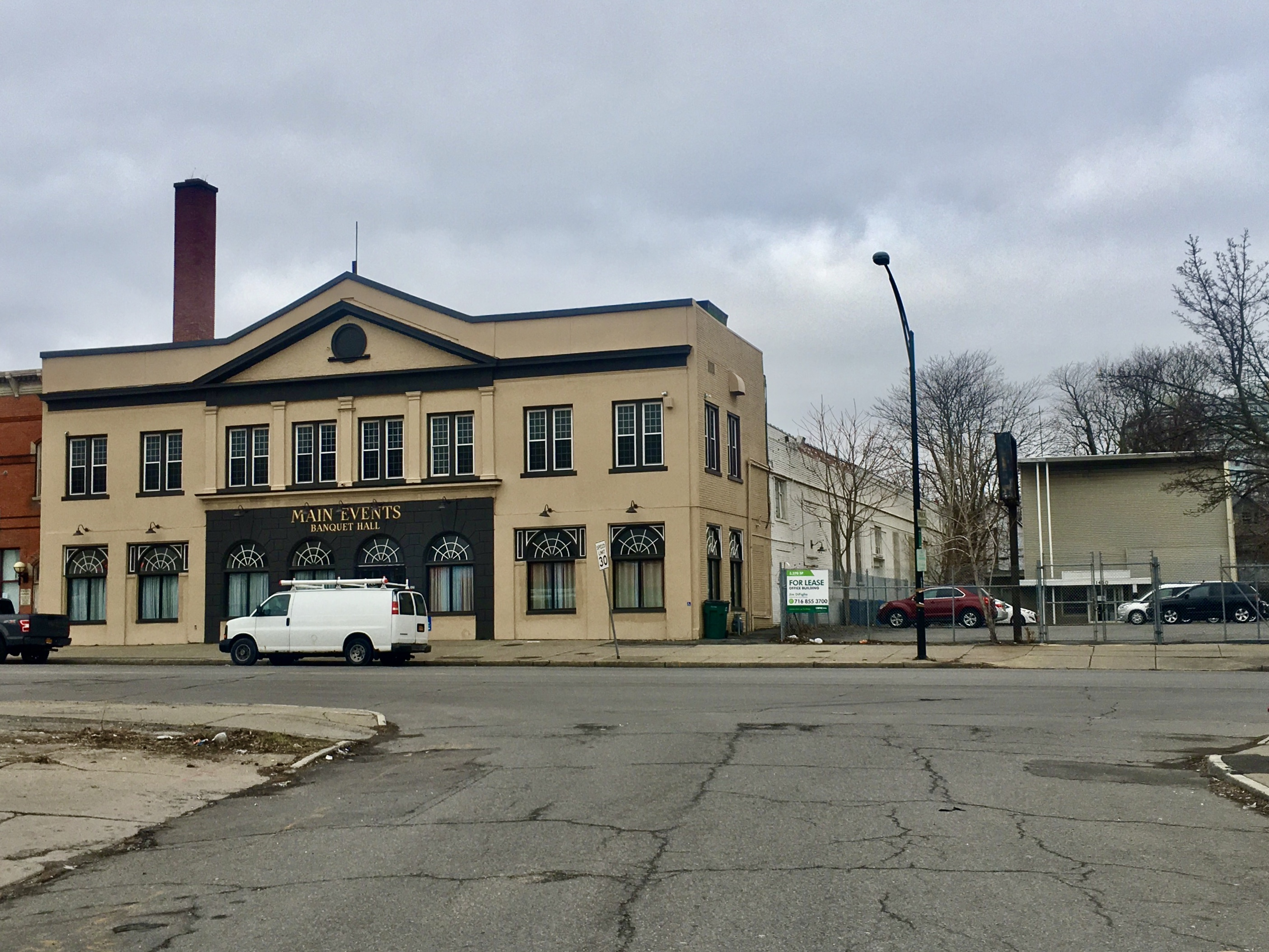
Two buildings that hosted the studios of WKBW radio. The building on the left, 1420 Main Street, was once the Churchill Evangelistic Tabernacle and the original home of WKBW Radio, and WKBW Television from its sign on in 1958 to 1978. The smaller building on the right, 1430 Main Street, held the studio of WKBW Radio from 1951 until 1978.

The station began operations, as WKBW, on October 22, 1926. It was originally licensed to Coatsworth & Diebold, but ownership was soon changed to the Churchill Evangelistic Association. Founder Clinton Churchill's application to the Department of Commerce for a station license reportedly requested assignment of the call letters "WAY"; however, this call sign was already in use by a ship, the Admiral Dewey, so the station was instead randomly assigned "WKBW" from a sequential list of available call signs. Churchill adopted a slogan of "Well Known Bible Witness" based on the call letters, and later usage referred to the middle letters "KB" as standing for "King of Buffalo", reflecting its 50,000-watt transmitting power.

WKBW was founded during a period when the U.S. government had temporarily lost its authority to assign transmitting frequencies. There were immediate complaints from the region that WKBW, on its self-assigned frequency, was badly interfering with the reception of multiple other stations. At the end of 1926 the station was reported transmitting on a non-standard frequency of 827 kHz.

The Federal Radio Commission (FRC) was formed in early 1927, which restored the U.S. government authority to assign station frequencies. This resulted in a series of frequency shifts that year for WKBW, including reassignments to 980, 1010 and finally 1380 kHz. On November 11, 1928, as a result of the FRC's General Order 40, WKBW changed to 1470 kHz, a "high power regional" frequency, and raised its power to 5,000 watts—the first Buffalo station to increase to that level. In early 1930 WKBW, along with KFJF in Oklahoma City, Oklahoma, was reassigned to 1480 kHz, another "high power regional" frequency.

In March 1941 WKBW inaugurated a new transmitter plant south of Buffalo in the town of Hamburg, increased power to 50,000 watts around the clock and shifted to its current "clear channel" frequency of 1520 kHz as a result of North American Regional Broadcasting Agreement, with the provision that as "Class I-B" stations, it and its Oklahoma City counterpart, now KOMA, had to maintain directional antennas at night to mutually protect each other from interference.

From the 1920s until the mid-1940s WKBW was affiliated with CBS Radio. Later it switched to the NBC Blue network and its corporate successor ABC, running as a conventional full service network affiliated station also offering local news and music programming. The station later broadcast a wide variety of ethnic, country and western and religious programming when not carrying network offerings, including pioneer rock and roll and rhythm and blues shows launched in the 1950s by disk jockey George "Hounddog" Lorenz, later founder of pioneer FM urban station WBLK. Stan Barron served as the station's sports director in this era.

=== Top 40 era ===
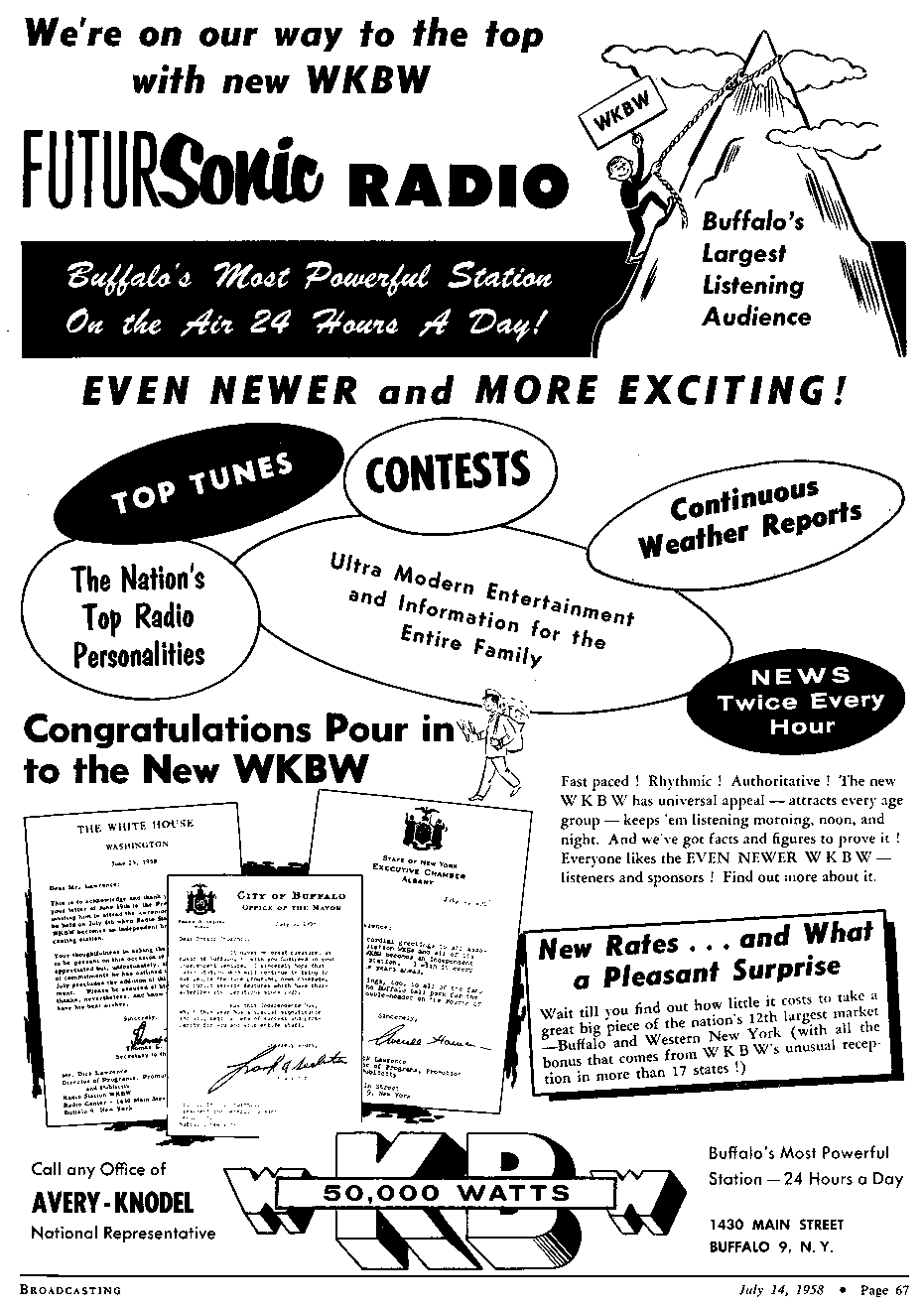
In 1958, WKBW introduced its energetic "FUTURSonic" format.

On July 4, 1958, a few months before companion station WKBW-TV (channel 7) was launched, WKBW radio abandoned its adult approach and was converted into a personality-driven full service Top 40 music radio station, featuring foreground personalities, a tight playlist of current hits and an aggressive local news department, which it continued to program with great success for over 20 years. It was one of the first stations to present traffic reports in cooperation with police and state and local authorities. Churchill sold WKBW-AM-TV to Capital Cities Broadcasting in 1961, earning a handsome return on his original investment of 35 years earlier.

During the exclusive Monkees "Sleepy Jean"/"Daydream Believer" broadcast in 1967, a recording was made in Sidi Yahia, Morocco. On Halloween Night 1968, writer Dan Kriegler and then-program director Jefferson Kaye (later the voice of WPVI-TV in Philadelphia, co-owned with WKBW-TV in 1971) commemorated the 30th anniversary of Orson Welles' 1938 War of the Worlds by re-making the infamous broadcast, updating the storyline and changing locations to make it significant to Buffalo listeners. Kaye (the voice of NFL Films) did another equally well-received remake of "War of the Worlds" in 1972 using a revised script and some new cast members including Jackson Armstrong and newsmen Jim McLaughlin and Joe Downey. Both versions have been recorded and collected by aficionados of classic radio programming.

During the late 1950s, 1960s and 1970s, WKBW became a major force in pop radio over the East Coast. KB had a 50,000-watt transmitter (the maximum power allowed) at their transmitter site in Hamburg. This high power blanketed the entire eastern U.S. with Top 40 music every night, and the station actually had a better signal at night in the western Boston suburbs than Boston's own Top 40 station, WMEX, located at 1510, right next door to WKBW. Disk jockeys included future Price Is Right announcer Rod Roddy, Dick Biondi, Danny Neaverth, Jack Armstrong, Joey Reynolds, Steve Mitchell, Bud Ballou, Norm Marshall, Tom Shannon, and the Amazin' Jim Quinn. Art Wander served as news director from 1956 to 1958, followed by Irv Weinstein from 1958 to 1964; Stan Barron, a holdover from the pre-rock and roll era, handled sports until his departure in 1965. Mike Joseph, later creator of the Hot Hits format, was a major off-air contributor to the station's approach to the "Futursonic" Top-40 format.

Beginning in the late 1960s, WKBW devoted a nightly hour of programming to underground music with its "Mixed Bag" block, one of the few commercial AM stations to embrace the freeform format; it was highly unusual for a 50,000-watt AM station to embrace the format that had theretofore been largely an FM and noncommercial phenomenon. In 1969, WKBW became the first radio station to air cuts from The Beatles' unreleased Get Back album. The recordings had been compiled from material The Beatles recorded in London in January 1969, the same sessions that would be used in The Beatles' Let It Be album, released in May 1970. Although WKBW was the first station to air the "Get Back" tapes, WBCN in Boston would be better known for playing them, as its broadcast of the tapes was preserved on a high-quality reel, which spawned several widely circulated bootlegs of The Beatles.

A recreated example of WKBW as an early 1960s-era pop radio station can be found on Ron Jacobs' "Cruisin' 1960" (Increase Records INCR 5–2005). This recreation features Dick Biondi and includes several classic rock and pop songs of that era, contemporary commercials, and DJ patter.

=== The 1980s and 1990s ===
The station continued with the Top 40 format until 1981, when, facing the emergence of FM competition, the station evolved to more of an adult contemporary format. By 1983, they leaned toward rock and roll oldies while still playing AC songs. They also added talk radio shows in the evenings by 1984. On June 15 of that year, WKBW began broadcasting in C-QUAM AM stereo.

In 1986, the WKBW stations were broken up as a result of Capital Cities' purchase of the American Broadcasting Company. WKBW radio was sold to Price Communications, who subsequently changed the station's call letters to the current WWKB on January 3, mainly to keep the long-standing "KB" slogan (which was necessitated due to an FCC regulation in effect then that forbade TV and radio stations in the same city, but with different owners from sharing the same call letters; the former calls remained on now-former sister station WKBW-TV, which Capital Cities/ABC sold to Queen City Broadcasting). In 1987, the station moved to a full service oldies format and on June 18, 1988, the station dropped live programming and switched to satellite-fed oldies. On March 6, 1989, WWKB flipped to business talk as part of the "Business Radio Network". It flipped to hot talk in 1993. WWKB aired J. R. Gach from WGR as the afternoon drive show and established syndicated hot talkers The Howard Stern Show (by this time now almost exclusively on the FM dial), G. Gordon Liddy, Laura Schlessinger, The Fabulous Sports Babe, Tom Leykis and (briefly, before Gach's arrival) Don and Mike. John Otto hosted a late night program in this era. Stern's and Gach's presence was not enough to revive KB's ratings in what was then a three way news-talk battle also involving market-leading WBEN and contender WGR, which itself later switched to its current format of sports talk and play by play.

By 1996, the format was flipped again to country music as "Real Country 1520 KB" (this despite there being three other country stations in Buffalo, WYRK, 107.7 and WXRL). Following that in 1998, was an all sports format using the now-defunct mono-only One on One Sports network, which moved to 107.7 after two years. On January 29, 2000, WWKB flipped to a simulcast of sister station WKSE. This lasted until June of that year, when it returned to business talk, a low-cost, albeit unpopular format.

Price Communications presided over the collapse of its entire radio portfolio including WWKB and filed for Chapter 11 bankruptcy in 1992. After reorganization, WWKB was sold to Keymarket Communications in 1994. Around the same time, Keymarket acquired one of WWKB's longtime rivals, WBEN, from locally based owners at a premium price. Keymarket then sold both WWKB and WBEN to St. Louis-based River City Broadcasting in 1995. Sinclair Broadcast Group acquired WWKB and WBEN in 1996 through its purchase of River City. A year later, Sinclair bought WGR, bringing three of Buffalo's heritage AM stations under its portfolio. In 1999, Sinclair decided to divest its radio stations, selling most of them, including WWKB, WBEN and WGR, to Entercom Communications.

=== The Legend returns ===
On January 27, 2003, WWKB returned to music, playing oldies from the station's heyday in the 1950s and 1960s, featuring artists such as Elvis Presley, The Beatles, The Beach Boys, Frankie Lymon, The Four Seasons, The Who, The Four Tops, The Everly Brothers, Fats Domino, Ricky Nelson, Lovin Spoonful, and many others. The oldies format was an attempt to recreate the station's history as a popular music station (and was part of a nationwide fad of "real oldies" formats on AM radio stations in the early 2000s). While it maintained the official WWKB calls for station identification, it also played the original "WKBW Buffalo" jingles and featured many of the classic WKBW jocks including Armstrong and Neaverth. While not performing as well in Arbitron ratings as it had in its golden past, the revived "WKBW" earned the best ratings for the station since the 1990s, with approximately a 2 share, and was beginning to grow.

=== Progressive talk era ===
Personality oldies has been a successful format in many markets, and Entercom salesman Buddy Shula would indeed find success with essentially the same format (including, for a time, Danny Neaverth and Tom Donahue) on WECK several years later. Nevertheless, Entercom found the personality oldies format too expensive to maintain in Buffalo for only a 2 share, and so on February 6, 2006, WWKB ended a three-year run as an oldies station with a format change to predominantly syndicated progressive talk. A syndicated overnight show hosted by former WKBW personality Joey Reynolds survived the format change. WWKB maintained their liberal talk format for another seven years. On April 16, 2008, the station started airing Randi Rhodes of the Nova-M Radio network, who had been fired from Air America.

The classic "WKBW" was honored by XM Satellite Radio on November 30, 2007, in a five-hour "Sonic Sound Salute" on The 60s on 6.

On July 3, 2008, ForgottenBuffalo.com celebrated the 50th anniversary of KB's format switch to Top 40 with a sidewalk sock hop. The event was held in front of the original studios located at 1430 Main Street in Buffalo. KB alumni Danny Neaverth, Stan Roberts and Tom Donahue attended. A limited edition poster commemorating the anniversary was produced.

As late as 2010 there were ongoing reports alleging that Entercom had cut back WWKB's power to 10,000 watts, to reduce electrical costs. However, Entercom did not file with the Federal Communications Commission to do so, and such a reduction was unconfirmed; indications are that the station's signal and range remained normal.

=== ESPN 1520 ===
Logo as "ESPN 1520"

On September 5, 2013, WWKB flipped to sports radio under the brand ESPN 1520AM. The ESPN Radio affiliation had previously been on WGR from the network's launch in 1992 until 2013; WGR's increased emphasis on local programming (and, since The Phil Hendrie Show moved to an earlier time slot, a lack of progressive talk programs to air in the overnight hours) prompted Entercom to move the ESPN affiliation to a full-time signal. The local sports broadcasts and brokered weekend programs that WWKB carried under its previous format continue under the ESPN affiliation; the station launched with a broadcast of the Buffalo Sabres' participation in the Traverse City Prospects Tournament.

The station was primarily a straight simulcast of the ESPN Radio feed, with the exception of The Jim Rome Show, at the time part of what was then known as CBS Sports Radio. Rome had previously aired on WGR for over a decade prior before the station opted to rearrange its local programming and move the somewhat lower-rated (and less locally relevant) Rome to WWKB.

=== The Bet 1520 ===
On September 13, 2021, WWKB flipped to sports gambling, branded as "The Bet Buffalo". Affiliations with The Jim Rome Show and the station's existing live sports programming remained unchanged.
