= George Lorenz =

Rock and Roll Radio DJ

- Died: May 29, 1972 (aged 52)
- Occupation: radio DJ
- Call sign: Hound Dog

George Lorenz (died 1972) was a radio DJ known for being an early broadcaster of rock and roll music in Buffalo, New York. He achieved a significant regional following at WKBW where he hosted a nightly show playing a wide variety of popular music. He also hosted live shows from Club Zanzibar, from where his radio show was broadcast. He is remembered for being a steadfast early supporter of rock and roll artists, especially African American artists. His show hosted many artists who would later become household names in the genre, such as Elvis Presley and Little Richard.

== Broadcasting career ==
Lorenz got his start in the entertainment industry performing in nightclubs in Buffalo, where he grew up. His first job as a radio broadcaster was at WBTA in Batavia, New York. Lorenz moved between stations frequently, in part because the managers of the stations did not appreciate him playing records by up and coming black R&B artists. It was during a stint at WJJL in Niagara, New York where he took on the nickname "Hound Dog". By 1953, when he took a job in Cleveland, he already had a large regional following.

In 1955 he returned to Buffalo and began to broadcast a nightly show for WKBW (now WWKB). His late night show would broadcast from the now-defunct Club Zanzibar, frequently to a live studio audience. His show had tens of thousands of fans, and was sought out as a channel to promote newly released music. During the mid 1950s he hosted performances from Elvis Presley, Little Richard, Buddy Holly and others at local venues in Buffalo, frequently to sold out crowds.

WKBW decided to switch to a top 40 format in 1958, and Lorenz quit rather than accept the artistic limitations that would entail. He created a syndicated show that could record in Buffalo and then sell to stations nationwide. In 1964, predicting a shift to FM radio, he bought WBLK-FM in Buffalo. He broadcast his own show on the station, and also hired other DJs, particularly targeting the African American community in Buffalo. He operated the radio station until his death in 1972 of a heart attack, at which point his son took over the station.
