= WBLK =

Radio station in Depew–Buffalo, New York

Coordinates: 42.886°N 78.873°W

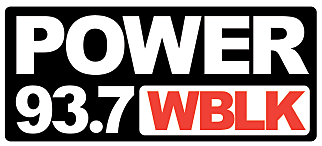
- Depew, New York; United States
- Broadcast area: Western New York
- Frequency: 93.7 MHz (HD Radio)
- Branding: Power 93.7 WBLK

Programming
- Format: Urban contemporary
- Affiliations: Compass Media Networks; Premiere Networks

Ownership
- Owner: Townsquare Media; (Townsquare Media of Buffalo, Inc.)
- Sister stations: WBUF, WTSS, WYRK

History
- First air date: December 10, 1964
- Call sign meaning: Early financial backer Benjamin L. Kulick

Technical information
- Licensing authority: FCC
- Facility ID: 71215
- Class: B
- ERP: 47,000 watts
- HAAT: 154 meters (505 ft)

Links
- Public license information: Public file; LMS
- Webcast: Listen Live
- Website: wblk.com

WBLK (93.7 FM) is a commercial radio station licensed to Depew, New York, United States, that serves Western New York, the Buffalo metropolitan area and the Niagara Region of Ontario. WBLK is owned by Townsquare Media and has an urban contemporary format.

WBLK can be classified as a "heritage" station, holding the same format and call letters since its debut. It is the oldest urban FM radio station in the U.S. The station also regularly ranks in the top 5 radio stations in Buffalo's Nielsen ratings. It has an effective radiated power (ERP) of 47,000 watts. The transmitter is atop the Rand Building in Downtown Buffalo and the studios are on a lower floor of the building.

== History ==
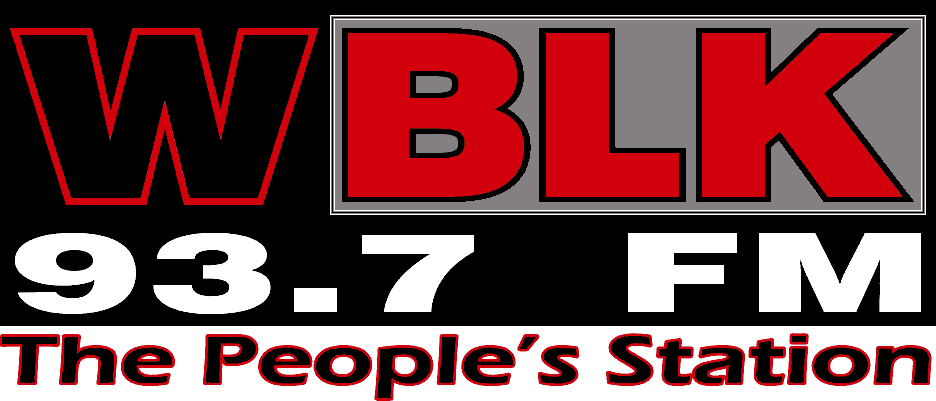
Station logo used with different slogans from 2003 until 2017.

=== Early years ===
The station signed on the air on December 10, 1964. It has always been primarily aimed at Western New York's African American population. WBLK was founded by legendary Buffalo disc jockey George "Hound Dog" Lorenz, who had earlier championed rhythm and blues music on local AM stations. Lorenz's voice was heard on WBLK from its inception until his death in 1972. Some on air personalities include Ernie "Mr. Blues" Jones, Roosevelt Tucker, Bradley J. Cool, Chuckie T., James Burns, Mansfield Manns, Jerry Young, Gary Lanier, Ron Baskin, Don Allen Sr. and his son Don Allen Jr., David Stafford, Lee Pettigrew, Don Robinson, Freddie Patrick, Rodney "Rockin" Lee, with Doug Blakely, Jason Denis, and Debbie Sims.

WBLK went from a mono signal to FM stereo in 1974. With a playlist called the "Funky Forty", at 3 p.m. on a July Monday, DJ Don Robinson flipped the switch and the stereo light flickered on. The first song heard in stereo was "Let's Get It On" by Marvin Gaye. WBLK went through several rebrandings over the years, including Rockin' BLK, FM Stereo 94, Soul Brother Radio, Soul Sister Radio, Soul Brother And Sister Radio, Rockin' Soul BLK, Rockin' Soul 'N' Stereo, Soul 'N' Stereo, Rockin' Soul 94 FM, WBLK Rockin' Soul, K94 FM, The BLK Style, Power 94, and simply 93.7 WBLK. In July 2017, it incorporated its digital dial position, calling itself Power 93.7 WBLK.

Contrary to popular belief, WBLK's call sign was not chosen to represent the words "we're black." It is a tribute to Benjamin L. Kulick, who was a major financial backer of the station when it first went on the air.

=== Ownership changes ===
In August 1995, D&R Radio, WBLK's original owners and founders, sold the station to Boston-based American Radio Systems. In September 1997, Infinity Broadcasting purchased WBLK and all of ARS' stations for $2.6 billion. Infinity was merged into CBS Radio in December 2005. WBLK began streaming its programming on the Internet on November 13, 2006, and was sold by CBS Radio to Regent Communications (now Townsquare Media) in December 2006.

For all of its existence, WBLK's playlist has been very diverse, as the station follows a full-service musical approach and incorporates many genres of urban music. This was partially due to the lack of direct competitors in the market. In 2017, long-time daytime-only station WUFO (1080 AM) launched a 24-hour FM translator, tweaked its format to Urban AC/classic hip hop, and rebranded as "Power 96.5". This gave WBLK an FM competitor for the first time. Another station appealing to a similar audience is WWWS (1400 AM), which airs an Urban Oldies format and added an FM translator as well (the station is now branded as "Classic R&B 1400 & 107.3”). Since the early 2000s, WBLK has "day-parted" its playlist. As of 2021, current Urban AC content can be heard from 2 a.m. (including the Steve Harvey Morning Show) through late afternoon. Current hip hop programming is heard in the late afternoon and evening hours, followed by "The Quiet Storm" (Monday-Thursdays) with a softer urban playlist after 11 p.m..

=== Audience in Southern Ontario ===
From its founding until the early 2000s, WBLK had a significant listenership among fans of urban music in Toronto, which did not have an urban-formatted radio station. Some commercials heard on WBLK during this time were geared towards listeners in Southern Ontario. The Southern Ontario audience's reliance on an American station with no Canadian content requirements significantly impacted the commercial development of Canadian hip hop and R&B.

In 1997, the station even began broadcasting live remote Fridays from the Industry nightclub in Toronto. Promoted as 'Wreckshop Radio', the club night featuring R&B and hip-hop was heard on WBLK for several years.

With the February 2001 launch of Toronto-based rhythmic contemporary station CFXJ-FM on the adjacent 93.5 MHz frequency, WBLK became a bit harder to find on some radio receivers with weaker tuners, and thus lost much of its prominence in the Toronto market.

=== In popular culture ===
A clip of WBLK's "Quiet Storm" block was highlighted in the song "After Dark" on Drake's album Scorpion, released in 2018. Drake was born and grew up in Toronto and was likely a WBLK listener in his early years.
