= WBKV =

Radio station in Buffalo, New York

- Buffalo, New York; United States
- Broadcast area: Buffalo–Niagara Falls metropolitan area
- Frequency: 102.5 MHz
- Branding: K-Love

Programming
- Language: English
- Format: Christian adult contemporary
- Network: K-Love

Ownership
- Owner: Educational Media Foundation
- Sister stations: WBWA; WLKW

History
- First air date: November 11, 1946
- Former call signs: WBEN-FM (1946–1987); WMJQ (1987–2000); WTSS (2000–2023)
- Former frequencies: 43.3 MHz (1946); 92.1 MHz (1946–47); 106.5 MHz (1947–58)
- Call sign meaning: "Buffalo's K-Love"

Technical information
- Licensing authority: FCC
- Facility ID: 34382
- Class: B
- ERP: 110,000 watts
- HAAT: 355 meters (1,165 ft)
- Transmitter coordinates: 42°39′33.2″N 78°37′32.1″W

Links
- Public license information: Public file; LMS
- Website: klove.com

WBKV (102.5 FM) is a radio station in Buffalo, New York. It is owned by Educational Media Foundation and is a part of its K-Love network.

The license currently on 102.5 has been operating since 1946, with predecessors dating to 1932; it is grandfathered as a "superpower" station, with an effective radiated power (ERP) of 110,000 watts, more than double the Federal Communications Commission limit, but comparable to Buffalo's other legacy FM licenses WBUF and WDCX-FM. The transmitter site is on Center Street in Colden, New York, on the WIVB-TV Tower.

From August 1974 to June 2023, the station operated as a contemporary music station, the last 23 years of the format branded as "Star 102.5", using the call sign WTSS. In that month, the station was sold to Educational Media Foundation, which installed its flagship K-Love network and WBKV call sign (previously heard on 89.9 FM, now WBWA) on the signal.

== History ==
=== W8XH and W8XA ===
WBEN, Inc. (a subsidiary of the Buffalo Evening News), the owner of AM station WBEN as of October 13, 1931, had experimented with higher-frequency broadcasts for over a decade prior to launch of the station that would become WBKV. Beginning in 1932, just two years after the News had launched its AM station, it received a license for W8XH, which began as a portable remote broadcasting license in the upper shortwave and low-VHF bands. (Note: The "8" in the call signs indicated that the stations were located in the 8th radio district, while the "X" reflected their operation as experimental stations.) In 1934, W8XH was upgraded to provide regular scheduled broadcasts to the general public, the first station in its band to do so. Like the standard broadcast band stations of the time, W8XH transmitted using amplitude modulation (AM); it was the first Apex station to operate on a regular schedule. That station converted to facsimile broadcasting as W8XA in 1939 before shutting down in December 1940.

=== WBEN-FM ===
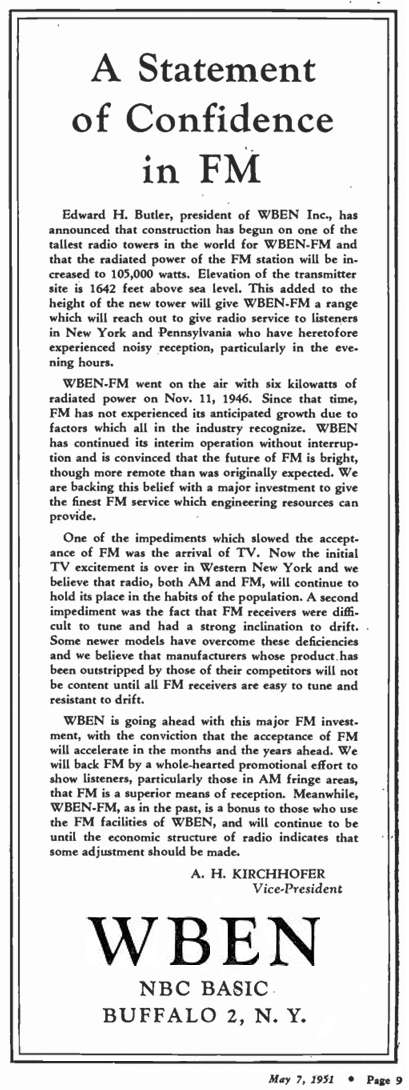
1951 station advertisement.

The Federal Communications Commission (FCC) issued a construction permit to WBEN, Inc. for a new FM station on 43.3 MHz on the original 42-50 MHz FM broadcast band on January 9, 1946, with the call sign WBEN-FM, for an application dated August 10, 1944. The FCC reassigned the station to 92.1 MHz in August 1946 after it created the current FM broadcast band on June 27, 1945. The station made its FM broadcast debut on November 11, 1946.

The station was subsequently reassigned by the FCC to 106.5 MHz in 1947, and mostly simulcast its AM counterpart. The FCC granted the station its first license on January 7, 1953, followed by a reassignment to 102.5 MHz in July 1958. (Note: The 106.5 frequency returned to the air under a new license in 1962 as WADV, later renamed WYRK.) It ceased simulcasting WBEN a few years later, with the exception of the Clint Buehlman morning show, which it carried until 1973. WBEN-FM aired a mixture of live and automated music, mostly easy listening and block music programming, such as organ music.

As FM listening grew, the station became "Rock 102" on August 1, 1974, using the syndicated TM "Stereo Rock" automated format then described as mainstream rock (which WBEN-FM management described as contemporary hit radio without bubblegum pop or prog rock), and dropping the morning show simulcast with WBEN. This same TM format and its prerecorded announcer were heard on other stations in Upstate New York during this period, including WGFM in Schenectady–Albany, WYUT in Herkimer (Utica-Rome), WKFM in Fulton–Syracuse, WNOZ in Cortland–Ithaca, and WPXY-FM in Rochester.

WBEN-AM-FM were sold to Algonquin Broadcasting effective March 1, 1978. Beginning in 1984, Rock 102's mornings were hosted live by Roger Christian, who had been with the station since 1976 and in Buffalo radio since 1964. (This Roger Christian, whose real name is Emerson Stevens, is not to be confused with the Buffalo-born disc jockey also known as Roger Christian, who was known as "Mike Melody" in Buffalo. Stevens may have chosen the name in honor of the real Roger Christian, who went on to a prolific career in radio and songwriting.) Christian remained with the station, lastly as midday host, until Entercom eliminated his position in September 2019. Rob Lucas joined the station in 1986 and remained there, most of that time as morning host, for the next 37 years until its 2023 sale and format change.

=== WMJQ ===
In 1987, the station shifted to a fully live format with the call sign WMJQ. As "Majic 102", the station competed heavily with WKSE for Buffalo's Top 40 audience in the late 1980s and early 1990s before shifting to a hot adult contemporary format on September 6, 1991, branded at the time as "Q102."

=== WTSS ===
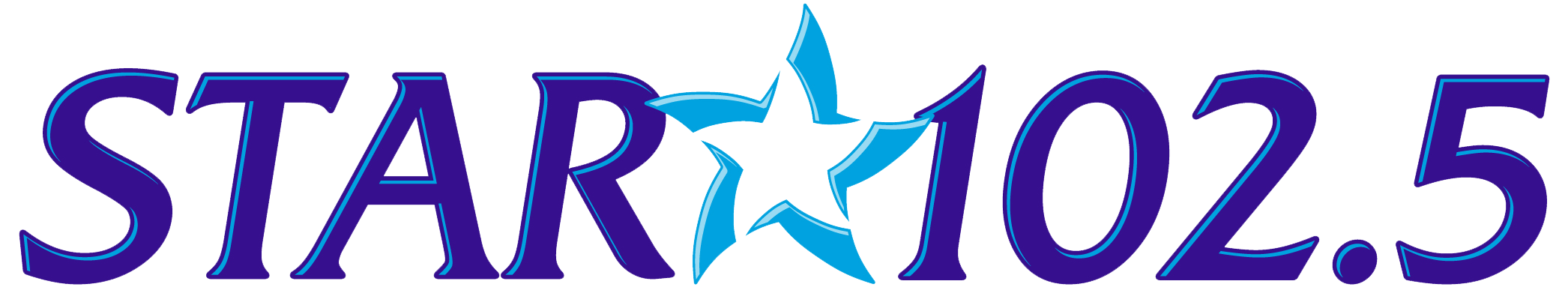
The station's logo as Star 102.5, used throughout its 23-year run with the brand

The "Star 102.5" moniker and call sign WTSS were adopted in 2000, shortly after Entercom (later Audacy, Inc.) purchased the station in 1999 from the Sinclair Broadcast Group, which was exiting radio to focus on its television holdings. It varied its presentation depending on the formats of other stations. For much of the mid-to-late 2000s, WTSS' playlist included music as early as the 1970s in an effort to serve listeners when Buffalo did not have an oldies station. It changed to hot adult contemporary after longtime oldies/classic hits outlet WHTT-FM returned to the oldies format. In 2006, WTSS began streaming its programming on the Internet. WTSS was nominated for Hot AC Station of the Year by Radio & Records magazine in 2006 and 2007. WTSS became Buffalo's only hot AC radio station following CFLZ-FM's flip from hot AC to adult hits in August 2011.

==== Buffalo's Christmas Station ====
From 2001 through its last holiday season of Audacy ownership in 2022, Star switched to the moniker "Buffalo's Christmas Station" and played all Christmas music. When it began this practice, it typically began the all-Christmas format in late November and ended it promptly at midnight on December 26. It slowly began progressing the launch date earlier and earlier in the 2010s until reaching November 1 in 2019, a date that WTSS settled upon each year afterward through the remainder of Audacy's ownership, making it one of the earliest adopters of the format in the United States each year; from 2018 onward, it continued its all-Christmas format for several days after the holiday, tapering off until New Year's Day. WTSS was temporarily delisted from Mediabase's Hot AC panel when the station went all-Christmas. To compensate for the extended period of Christmas music, the station adjusted the playlist over the course of the season, with Christmas novelty songs being held back until later in the season to avoid listener fatigue.

WTSS was noted for its success with the Christmas format (regularly defeating its rival WJYE by wide margins), which Lucas credited to a program strategy that involved a wider playlist (up to 250 songs at the end of the Star run, compared to 150 used in most all-Christmas formats), willingness to play a more up-tempo mix of songs, aggressive promotion of new Christmas hits, local artists, and carefully spacing out recurrent rotation to eliminate over-repetition of titles and/or artists. Lucas authored a booklet guide describing his strategy at WTSS, The Art of Scheduling Christmas Music, after the format ended.

=== WBKV ===
Audacy filed to sell WTSS, along with WLFP in Germantown/Memphis, Tennessee, to the Educational Media Foundation (EMF) for $15.5 million in April 2023; the two stations, along with KQPS in Palm Desert, California, had been transferred into a subsidiary, Audacy Atlas, for assets designated for sale earlier in the year. In June 2023, EMF filed to move the WBKV call sign, which EMF had been using on the 89.9 frequency in Buffalo, to 102.5 with intent of also installing WBKV's affiliation with K-Love on the 102.5 signal, with 89.9 being repurposed as Air1 station WBWA. Ahead of the sale's completion, WTSS began airing promos directing "Star" listeners to sister station WKSE. EMF chose WTSS as the signal it wanted to purchase because of its strong coverage of Southern Ontario, effectively turning the station explicitly into a border blaster.

WTSS announced on June 8 that it would sign off the 'Star' format on June 9 at 10:00 a.m., with morning host Rob Lucas, who had declined an offer to stay with Audacy's cluster, performing the ceremonial farewell. Afternoon host Sue O'Neill shifted to sister station WKSE. The final song on "Star 102.5" was "Iris" by the Buffalo-native duo Goo Goo Dolls.

Following the format sign-off, WTSS began simulcasting WKSE temporarily until the completion of the sale to EMF. Meanwhile, Townsquare Media-owned rival WMSX immediately rebranded as "The New Star 96.1", purporting itself to be the successor of WTSS despite differing ownership. It changed its call sign to WTSS later that same month but dropped the Star brand in October. The Star 102.5 online feed resumed operating through the Audacy app and on WLKK-HD2, Audacy's rimshot signal in Wethersfield, New York, carrying an automated and unhosted playlist with all of the former WTSS bumpers on June 17; this continued to run through November 17, 2026 before being discontinued. WKSE's decision to absorb most of the 'Star' playlist also prompted Cumulus Media to flip WBBF, at the time carrying a network-originated classic hip hop format, to top 40 to fill the format void in July.

On June 16, at 2 p.m., the sale of WTSS to EMF was officially completed, and the station went off the air to transition the station to EMF's control, returning several hours later with K-Love network programming. The station changed its call sign to WBKV the same day.

== Broadcast signal/Canadian listenership ==
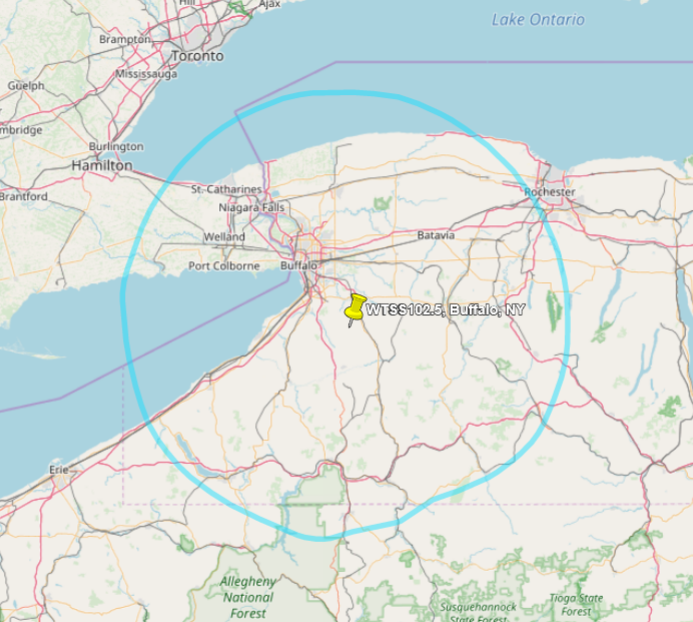
WBKV coverage map from the FCC.

WBKV is a grandfathered "superpower" station. The station's effective radiated power (ERP) exceeds the maximum limit allowed for a Class B FM station, and is also far above the maximum allowable ERP for its antenna height above average terrain (HAAT) according to current FCC rules. WBKV is one of the strongest FM signals in the Northeastern United States at 110,000 watts effective radiated power (ERP), at a height above average terrain (HAAT) of 355 meters (1,165 ft).

WBKV and WDCX-FM have the strongest FM signals in Western New York, both broadcasting with 110,000 watts, although WBKV has a much taller tower. Sharing the tower of WIVB-TV, the station's transmitter is located on a high ridge in the Allegheny Plateau, 20 miles southeast of Buffalo, near Colden, New York. WBKV can be heard in the Rochester metropolitan area, although some adjacent channel interference is picked up from WVOR (102.3 MHz) and WLGZ-FM (102.7 MHz). WBKV's signal also extends across the Pennsylvania state line, around Allegheny State Park, as well as parts of Erie County, Pennsylvania, although adjacent channel interference exists at 102.3 MHz from classic rock station WQHZ in and west of the city of Erie, also where co-channel interference with WZOO-FM in Ashtabula, Ohio (also at 102.5 MHz), begins.

WBKV can also be heard in parts of the Greater Toronto Area, where the signal crosses Lake Ontario. At times during the station's history, before the FM band became more crowded (and especially during its run as "Rock 102"), it performed as a top-10 rated station in Toronto. Other Buffalo area radio stations with strong signals and in formats not available in Canada at the time, such as WGR, WKSE, and WBLK, were also highly rated in Toronto.

== HD Radio and translator ==
In 2006, WBKV began offering an HD2 channel called "The Delta", which featured Delta blues music. The HD2 channel later became a simulcast of co-owned station WLKK. The HD2 channel fed an FM translator in Buffalo, W284AP on 104.7 MHz. WLKK's transmitter is in Wethersfield, New York, a rural town in Wyoming County, making reception difficult in some parts of Buffalo, so the HD2 channel and translator were alternatives for WLKK listeners.

An HD3 channel had broadcast Family Life Network (FLN), a Christian radio network, primarily to serve as an originating station for FLN's translators (Townsquare Media station WBUF now serves that purpose). In October 2019, the HD3 channel switched to Channel Q, an Entercom service for LGBTQ listeners, featuring talk shows on weekdays and dance music nights and weekends.

EMF does not usually run HD Radio subchannels outside of areas with challenged signals to feed translator networks, and wound down both HD services when they took control on June 16, 2023. WLKK's simulcast shifted to WKSE-HD2, with W284AP also shifting to simulcast the same HD Radio subchannel.
