= WGR-FM =

Radio station in Wethersfield, New York

Simulcast of WGR, Buffalo
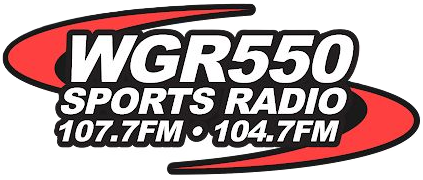
- Wethersfield, New York; United States
- Broadcast area: Western New York
- Frequency: 107.7 MHz (HD Radio)
- Branding: WGR 550 Sports Radio

Programming
- Language: English
- Format: Sports radio
- Affiliations: BetMGM Network; Westwood One Sports; Buffalo Sabres

Ownership
- Owner: Audacy, Inc.; (Audacy License, LLC)
- Sister stations: WGR; WBEN; WKSE; WWKB; WWWS; WROC

History
- First air date: June 6, 1948
- Former call signs: WFNF (1948–1953); WRRL (1953–1960); WBIV (1960–1982); WUWU (1982–1986); WBYR (1986–1988); WBMW (1988–1991); WEZQ (1991–1992); WNUC (1992–2000); WNSA (2000–2004); WLKK (2004–2026)

Technical information
- Licensing authority: FCC
- Facility ID: 9250
- Class: B
- ERP: 17,000 watts
- HAAT: 258 meters (846 ft)
- Transmitter coordinates: 42.623°N 78.288°W
- Translators: 104.7 W284AP (Buffalo, relays WKSE-HD2)
- Repeater: 98.5 WKSE-HD2 (Niagara Falls)

Links
- Public license information: Public file; LMS
- Webcast: Listen live (via Audacy)
- Website: www.audacy.com/wgr550

WGR-FM (107.7 FM) is a radio station located in Wethersfield, New York, owned by Audacy, Inc. It operates from studios at Audacy's Buffalo offices in Amherst, New York, with its transmitter located near Warsaw, 35 miles southeast of Buffalo.

The station has had a long history of frequent format changes, with formats changing every four to seven years. Its owners have typically used the signal as a pass-through for other national format trends in its portfolio. The station currently airs a simulcast of its sports radio sister station WGR with the idea of extending WGR's listening area into Batavia and western Rochester, New York.

== History ==
=== Earliest days: Rural Radio Network ===
The FM station on 107.7 at Wethersfield originally started broadcasting June 6, 1948, as WFNF, a member of the Rural Radio Network based in Ithaca.

The network changed ownership three times in the 1960s, and was most notable between 1969 and 1981 for being upstate New York's arm of Pat Robertson's original Christian Broadcasting Network as WBIV.

=== WUWU ===
In November 1981, Robertson dismantled the CBN radio division and sold WBIV for roughly $350,000 to a coalition led by Ron Chmiel, a dentist based in Williamsville; John Bunkfeldt, who owned radio stations in Utica; Bob Allen, a local program director; and Allen's parents and aunt. Chmiel held a majority stake of roughly 60%, while Bunkfeldt and the Allen family each held 20%. Allen, then age 32, had either left or been fired from six radio stations in the previous 12 years, and by buying a minority stake in the station, Allen believed he was untouchable, no matter what he did.

WUWU began as an effort to revive progressive/underground rock radio, by then a nearly extinct format, with personnel who had previously been involved with the city's previous progressive station from 12 years prior, WPHD, and with short-lived revivals of the format that had appeared on WBUF and WZIR between then and 1981; it even recycled WBUF's mascot from that era, a green parrot. WUWU was the first incarnation of the station explicitly marketed as a rimshot to the Buffalo market, establishing a studio in West Seneca that would continue to be used for the next two decades. Eighteen months after the purchase and format flip, tensions between Allen and Chmiel had reached a breaking point: Allen had allegedly used his talkback program The Town Crier to spew obscenities (which Allen denied), and Allen had increasingly tried to force WUWU to adopt a heavy metal format over the objections of Chmiel, advertisers and the board of directors. Quoth Allen: "He can't fire me. I don't fill teeth, and he doesn't know how to run a radio station." Allen had also developed paranoid delusions of Chmiel attempting to sell the then money-losing station to another buyer at a steep profit, which Chmiel denied. Chmiel fired Allen on May 21, 1983, only for Allen to refuse to accept the firing and show up to work the next day with an armed guard. When Chmiel himself hired two armed guards to keep Allen out of the WUWU studios, on May 27, 1983, Allen, Bunkfeldt and two accomplices drove equipment for remote broadcasting out to the Wethersfield transmitter site and hijacked the signal, where he declared an "emergency broadcast" and began playing heavy metal until Wyoming County sheriffs surrounded the transmitter site and arrested them; the hijacking lasted roughly one hour. The arrest also did not deter Allen, who again hijacked the station in early July; this incident was somewhat more successful, lasting nine hours throughout the overnight before being accosted by police.

Allen escaped criminal trespass and obstruction of justice prosecution when, in December 1983, the Wethersfield town judge presiding over the May trespassing case accepted a motion for dismissal on procedural grounds. The charges for the July incident were dropped because Allen had hired the winner of the county's district attorney election that November, which would have forced the county to hire a special prosecutor at their expense to prosecute the case. Allen and Chmiel both sued each other.

WUWU eventually shifted to a New Age and jazz format as "The Sound Future," a format that lasted until 1986.

=== WBYR ===
During Memorial Day weekend in 1986, the station flipped to classic rock as "The Bear -- High Quality Rock and Roll." WBYR had a brief moment of great success in the classic rock format; the heritage album-oriented rock station, WGRQ-FM, was at the time an adult contemporary music station known as "WRLT," and as such, WBYR was able to make inroads into the Buffalo market, including hiring WGRQ jock Slick Tom Tiberi. This, however, ended when WRLT changed back to classic rock as WGRF and hired back Tiberi. Chmiel finally gave up on the station and sold WBYR to John Casciani.

=== WBMW and WEZQ ===
In November 1988, the station flipped to Smooth jazz as "The Wave", and changed call letters to WBMW. Due to continued poor ratings, the station then flipped to easy listening on August 6, 1990, as WEZQ ("Easy 107.7"), hoping to pick up disenfranchised listeners of WJYE, which shifted from their long-running easy listening format to adult contemporary two years prior. However, the format, which was already out of fashion by the time 107.7 adopted it, would be dropped on August 31, 1992.

=== WNUC ===
On August 31, 1992, the station flipped to country music as WNUC. Initially branding as "New Country", WNUC would eventually be renamed "The Bullet". The station intended to compete with WYRK (and indirectly, WBEE, WPIG and many others). One of its longest-running formats, country on WNUC ran until October 2000, when Casciani sold the station to Adelphia Communications for $5,600,000.

=== WNSA ===
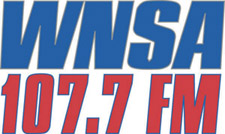
Logo as WNSA

In October 2000, Adelphia flipped the station to sports radio as WNSA. This station was a relatively rare monaural FM station, unlike its stereophonic counterparts; this was in part to increase the station's coverage area. Its initial slogan was "The Sports Authority" (from which it drew its call sign) until the sporting goods retailer of the same name levied a lawsuit against Adelphia in 2001; the station modified the slogan to "Sports Paradise".

Between October 2000 and April 2004, Empire Sports Network, under VP/GM Bob Koshinski, operated the radio station, aimed at fans from Western New York into the Finger Lakes. The purpose of WNSA's existence was to challenge WGR, Buffalo's often antagonistic sports talk station. Howard Simon was recruited to host morning drive, longtime Buffalo sports talker Art Wander hosted during lunch, and radio newcomer Mike Schopp launched "Sports Talk for Smart People" during the afternoon drive. Later additions would include Jim Brinson, Doug Young (who defected from WGR and is widely credited as the person who landed the interviews and guests that made WNSA so popular), and Zig Fracassi, who had been a nationally syndicated host until the dissolution of the Sports Fan Radio Network. Jim Kelley, Mike Robitaille and Schopp (later replaced by Simon) hosted a two-hour show known as The Sharpshooters prior to Buffalo Sabres games. The station affiliated with Sporting News Radio and was among the first to carry the Sports USA Radio Network's NFL coverage. WNSA carried many of the same sporting events as Empire, including Sabres and Destroyers games, and WNSA consistently outperformed WGR in the ratings for most of its run.

WNSA also held several unique promotions such as the Western New York Sports Symposium, which was a yearly, two-day event held at an event center which included participation by the Buffalo Bills, Buffalo Sabres, Buffalo Bisons and most of the Buffalo area colleges. The symposium featured two days of sports talk from the event location and numerous round table discussions with dozens of notable Buffalo sports team players, coaches, alumni, announcers, and newspaper columnists.

WNSA also created a fictitious radio fantasy hockey game called Sabres Showdown that pitted the Buffalo Sabres 1975 Stanley Cup finalists against the 1999 Sabres finalist squad. The game featured actual Sabres play-by-play man Rick Jeanneret and analyst Mike Robitaille calling the action as well as staged and archival interviews with Sabres players and management from both eras. The taped broadcast was enough of a success to be rerun a year after its original broadcast. Other unique features included "Superfan," a humorous short-form serial about a Buffalo sports fan endowed with superpowers, and "Haseoke," a feature in which audiotapes allegedly from Sabres goaltender Dominik Hašek singing karaoke were played on-air (poking fun at Hašek's thick Bohemian accent).

During Empire's ownership, 107.7 added its first Buffalo-area translator, W297AB in Williamsville, to improve the station's signal quality in Buffalo and the inner-ring suburbs. In December 2018, the translator was transferred to AM 1400, by this point a sister station.

The station's fortunes would collapse when the Rigas/Adelphia Communications scandal was exposed. After filing Chapter 11 bankruptcy, the new Adelphia management decided to sell off WNSA despite its solid performance. That resulted in the retirement of Art Wander, the defection of Mike Schopp to WGR and part-time work at ESPN Radio. Adelphia Communications began to slash WNSA's budget to prepare it for sale. Howard Simon's show was moved to afternoon drive time, began simulcasting on Empire, and was dubbed The SimonCast, and the other personalities, none of whom seemed to be interested in the morning drive slot, rotated the AM shift (WNSA insisted on a local morning show because the Sporting News offering, Murray in the Morning, was deemed too inappropriate for its as-stated "PG-rated" listening audience). Ratings fell below those of WGR toward the end. The end of WNSA came when the station was sold to WGR's owner, Entercom Communications, in May 2004 for $10.5 million, and announced an immediate format change. Simon's show, however, would continue on WLVL in Lockport until November 2004, when he was recruited to host WGR's morning show.

Many WNSA staffers found jobs at WGR, while others (particularly those who had worked at both WNSA and WNUC) ended up at WYRK. Several hundred hours of WNSA's programming, including several unique specials, were archived by producer Steve Cichon and are available for purchase.

For legal purposes, upon Entercom's purchase of the station its official studio was shared with WCJW in Warsaw, a legal fiction which ended with the elimination of the Main Studio Rule by the FCC in 2017.

=== WLKK ===
==== The Lake ====
Logo as "The Lake." At seven years—16 if its continuation on HD2 is counted—it was one of the station's longest formats and the source of its WLKK call sign.

After Entercom closed on the purchase, WNSA began stunting with the sounds of crickets for a few days before flipping to a wide-ranging classic rock format, branded as "The Lake", and changed call letters to WLKK. The station maintained and exceeded the number of listeners that the station had during the peak of WNSA's run. WLKK indirectly took aim at the classic rock market and sought to create a more laid-back, relaxed atmosphere. The playlist of WLKK contained a large portion of hit songs from the 1970s and 1980s (broad enough that the station boasted it never repeated a song throughout an entire 24-hour day), less focused on hard rock and metal than most classic rock stations, but also containing the occasional deep track. In this sense, the station's format was adult album alternative. In addition, the station used a series of bumpers with flowing water, chirping birds, and a deep voice reading the station slogan.

Disc jockeys, which included Hank Dole and Lorne Hunter, occasionally told the story behind the song (sometimes from CD liner notes). They also played WNY musicians on a regular basis and offered a local music show on Monday nights, hosted by Robbie Takac, a local music promoter and member of The Goo Goo Dolls, a band who hails from Buffalo.

After the 2011 format change, the "Lake" format continued on WLKK's HD2 digital subchannel, and without any jocks; all of WLKK's staff was laid off in the change. "The Lake" also continued to maintain its Internet stream, without commercials. The Lake on HD2 was quietly dropped in 2020; a year later, the format would resurface on non-commercial station WBFO-HD2.

In the eastern part of the listening area south of Rochester and in the Western Finger Lakes, WCGR in Canandaigua, New York, is branded as 'The Lake' with a similar soft classic rock format.

==== WBEN (AM) simulcast ====
On April 4, 2011, Entercom announced that WLKK would become a complete simulcast of sister station WBEN (AM), effective at Midnight on April 5, 2011. For the first year and a half of the simulcast, WLKK was the only station carrying Rush Limbaugh live in the Rochester metropolitan area (Rochester affiliate WHAM carried Limbaugh on a two-hour delay at the time, and WLKK's signal is listenable in many portions of the Rochester metropolitan area); WHAM responded to WLKK's switch to talk by moving its delayed broadcast of Limbaugh up an hour, then eventually to a live slot. Despite an initial announcement that WLKK would not carry the Sabres Hockey Network, WBEN later reversed that decision and announced that Sabres playoff games would be heard on WBEN and WLKK in addition to their flagship station, WGR.

==== Alternative Buffalo ====
former logo prior to addition of 104.7 simulcast

On September 25, 2013, Entercom announced that WLKK will drop the WBEN simulcast. This was due to the low audience on the FM; in fact, according to an Arbitron study, 90% of WBEN's audience continued to listen on the AM side. At Noon the following day, following "Beach And Company", WLKK changed their format to alternative rock, branded as "Alternative Buffalo 107.7". The first song on "Alternative Buffalo" was "Ho Hey" by The Lumineers. This brings the format back to the market for the first time since 2005, when WEDG shifted to a harder-edged active rock format. Since the format change, there has been an increase in the number of alternative acts that have played Buffalo venues.

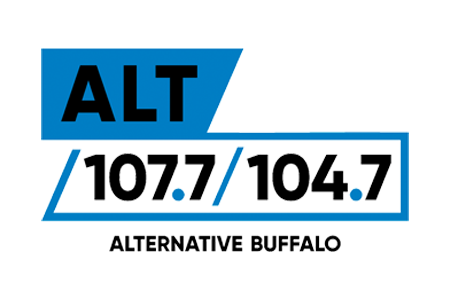
Logo as "Alt 107.7/104.7" (2020–2021)

Beginning in 2014, the station began holding an annual alternative music concert series called Kerfuffle. The day-long event was held at Canalside in downtown Buffalo.

In May 2014, Family Life Ministries agreed to sell translator W284AP (on 104.7 FM) to Entercom Communications for $125,000. The translator rebroadcast WTSS-HD2, which switched to a simulcast of WLKK on May 11, 2015.

On September 13, 2020, WLKK/W284AP quietly rebranded as "Alt 107.7/104.7", as part of a systemic "revamping" of Entercom's alternative rock stations. As part of the change, Entercom let go of all local on-air personalities from WLKK (except for midday jock Brandi), and began simulcasting WNYL, Entercom's alternative station in New York City, for much of the day.

==== The Wolf ====
The Wolf (2021–2026)

At 5 p.m. on June 30, 2021, after playing "Good Riddance (Time of Your Life)" by Green Day, WLKK/W284AP flipped to country, branded as "107.7 & 104.7 The Wolf", bringing the format back to the 107.7 FM frequency for the first time since the run as WNUC ended in 2000. As with the later months of the alternative format, the country format on WLKK is largely driven by the national business model of the former Entercom, which rebranded itself as Audacy earlier in the year; the stated reason for making the flip was that Audacy saw "an opportunity to add country" to the Buffalo cluster. Liz Mantel, who had spent six of the previous eight years at WYRK, was the first local personality hired for the station, becoming the morning host in September 2021. WLKK continued to carry an alternative-formatted "New Arrivals" format on its HD2 channel until February 2023, when Audacy began to phase out its HD Radio-exclusive subchannels (by which point WBFO-HD2 and WEDG had both adopted alternative formats of their own).

In October 2024, WLKK shifted to a more gold-focused country format, while maintaining "The Wolf" branding with the slogan "Buffalo's Real Country".

=== WGR-FM ===
Signs of another format change emerged in late October 2025, when Audacy registered domain names tied to a potential revival of its "Star" hot adult contemporary format (at the time airing on WLKK-HD2, after having aired on the former WTSS on FM 102.5 for over 20 years prior to Audacy selling that signal) and unveiled a "Star 107.7" logo on that format's still-active Web site and social media; the revelation was timed shortly before Star traditionally flipped to its highly successful all-Christmas format for the season. Ultimately, this format flip never occurred and Star remained exclusive to HD2.

==== WGR simulcast ====
On February 3, 2026, concurrent with the announcement that the Buffalo Bills would leave their flagship station WGR (also owned by Audacy) and affiliate with Good Karma Brands (a station group that has no owned-and-operated stations in Buffalo) for its radio broadcasts, multiple Buffalo news outlets began reporting that Audacy would soon begin simulcasting WGR on WLKK and W284AP. Audacy had introduced FM simulcasts in a majority of major markets where it operated AM sports stations, most notably launching a simulcast on WSCR-FM in Chicago just a day before. It was also part of a broadening of the WGR brand into the Genesee region of Western New York, as on February 20, WROC in Rochester would begin simulcasting the WGR-AM/FM lineup.

In February, Audacy applied to the FCC to have WLKK's call letters changed to WGR-FM effective February 19. It is the second such station to hold the call signs, as WGRF had previously held them from 1959 to 1973 and from 1988 to 1991.

At midnight on February 17, 2026, WGR began simulcasting on WLKK. Its call letters officially changed to WGR-FM two days later. The last song to be played on The Wolf was "Whiskey on You" by Nate Smith, followed by a brief pause before the official switch. Morning host Liz Mantel moved to WUSW, which launched a similar gold-based country format later that year.

== Star 102.5 on HD2 ==
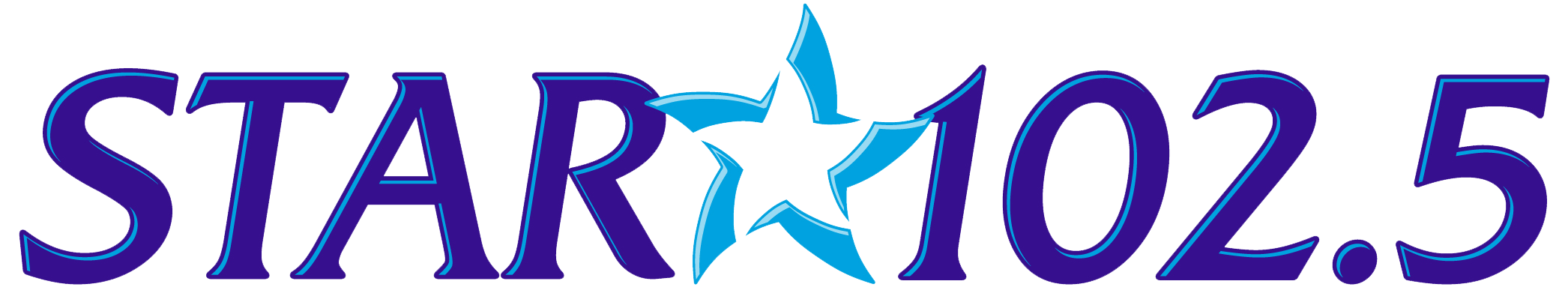
Star 102.5, still anachronistically using its former frequency, moved to 107.7-HD2 in June 2023 and remained there until November 2026.

In June 2023, as part of Audacy's continuing financial downsizing, Audacy moved its hot adult contemporary station, Star 102.5, to a reactivated HD2 channel on WLKK after the 102.5 license was sold to K-Love as WBKV. The maneuver was an effort to retain the intellectual properties of the station after the sale, as a countermeasure against rival broadcaster Townsquare Media acquiring the WTSS call sign that had been on 102.5 and branding the station then known as WMSX (a longstanding rival of Star's) as "The New Star 96.1." Townsquare's WTSS dropped the "Star" brand in October after discussions with Audacy; The Buffalo News media critic Alan Pergament raised the possibility that Star 102.5 would revive its Christmas music format on WLKK-HD2 in November. WLKK-HD2 flipped to Christmas music as usual on November 1, matching 96.1's flip. In April 2024, Audacy indicated plans to continue operating the digital-only "Star 102.5" when it included the channel among a suite that would begin using Super Hi-Fi AI-powered automation.

On October 10, 2024, WLKK-HD2 became the first station in North America to flip to Christmas music that was not doing so as part of a stunt, issuing its first social media statements since the station left analog FM. It was again first in 2025, doing so on the morning of October 18.

On November 18, 2026, after the feed did not change to Christmas music that year, "Star 107.7 HD2" was quietly discontinued and all remaining traces of the station's online presence were redirected to WKSE.

== Translator ==
Broadcast translator for WKSE-HD2
| Call sign | Frequency | City of license | FID | ERP (W) | Class | FCC info |
|---|---|---|---|---|---|---|
| W284AP | 104.7 FM | Buffalo, New York | 9254 | 250 | D | LMS |

== Archived links ==
- WNUC Web site, from 1997
- WLKK format and jock history to 2000, via BillDulmage.com
- WNSA Web site, from 2002
