= WKSE =

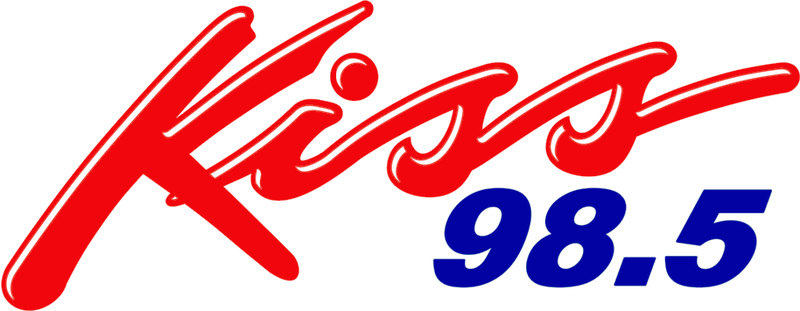
- Niagara Falls, New York; United States
- Broadcast area: Western New York
- Frequency: 98.5 MHz (HD Radio)
- Branding: Kiss 98.5

Programming
- Language: English
- Format: Contemporary hit radio
- Subchannels: HD2: sports radio (WGR-FM); HD3: News/talk (WBEN); HD4: Sports radio (WGR)

Ownership
- Owner: Audacy, Inc.; (Audacy License, LLC)
- Sister stations: WBEN; WGR; WGR-FM; WWKB; WWWS

History
- First air date: January 1, 1946
- Former call signs: WHLD-FM (1946–1980); WZIR (1980–1984); WRXT (1984–1985)
- Call sign meaning: "Kiss"

Technical information
- Licensing authority: FCC
- Facility ID: 34384
- Class: B
- ERP: 46,000 watts
- HAAT: 128 meters (420 ft)
- Transmitter coordinates: 43.005°N 78.993°W
- Translator: HD2: 104.7 W284AP (Buffalo)

Links
- Public license information: Public file; LMS
- Webcast: Listen live (via Audacy)
- Website: www.audacy.com/kiss985

WKSE (98.5 FM) branded Kiss 98.5, is a commercial radio station licensed to Niagara Falls, New York, and serving the Buffalo metropolitan area. It airs a contemporary hit radio format and is owned by Audacy, Inc. The station's studios are located on Corporate Parkway in Amherst, New York.

WKSE has an effective radiated power (ERP) of 46,000 watts. Its transmitter is off Staley Avenue on Grand Island, New York. WKSE broadcasts using HD Radio technology; its HD2 and HD4 digital subchannel simulcasts co-owned WGR's sports radio programming, while the HD3 subchannel simulcasts co-owned WBEN.

== History ==
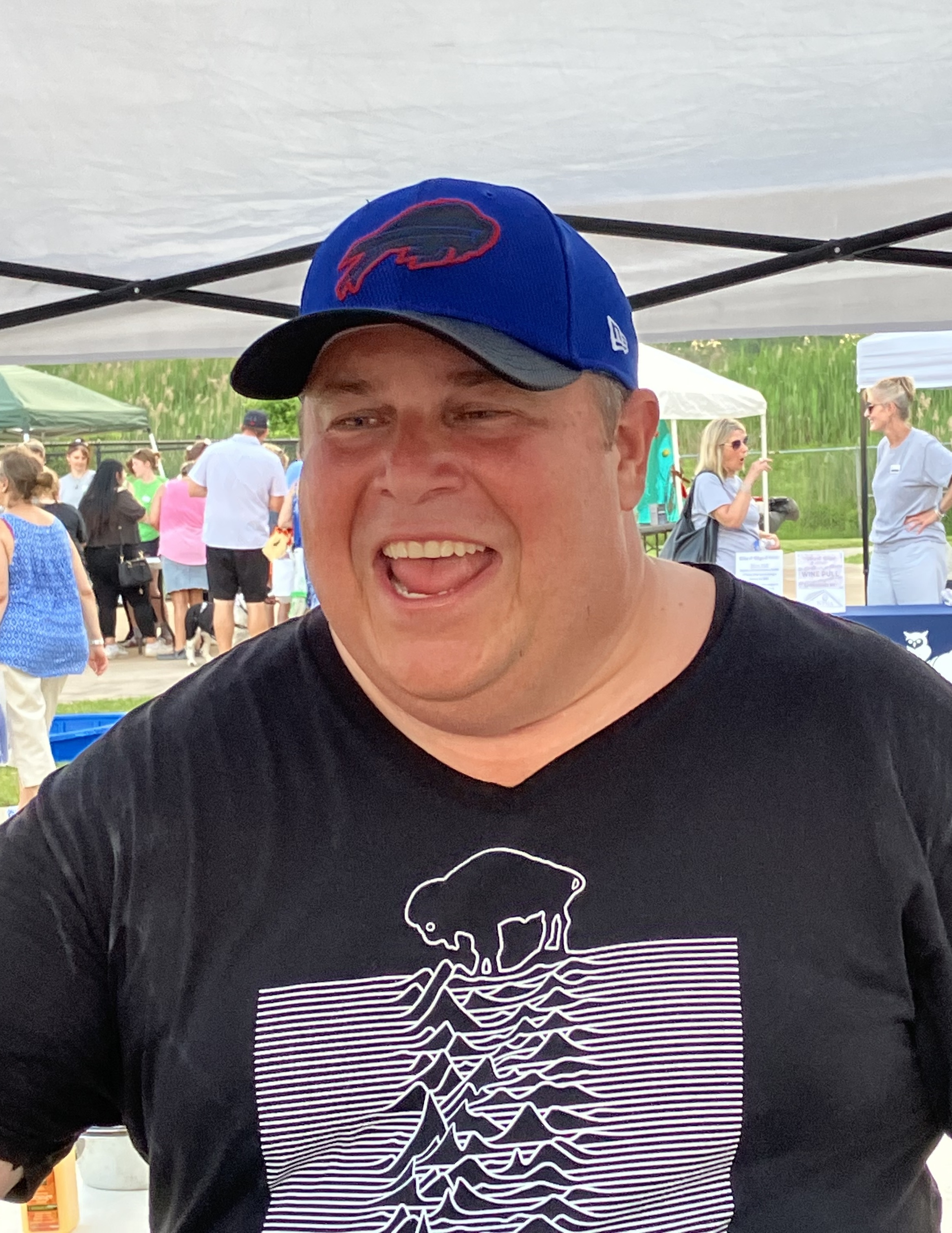
Nicholas Picholas DJing at an SPCA Wine and Wags festival in West Seneca, NY in June 2022.

The station signed on the air as WHLD-FM on January 1, 1946. It was the FM counterpart to WHLD and largely simulcast the AM station's programming in its early years. In the late 1960s, it switched to a beautiful music format with some classical music programming as well.

The station changed its call sign to WZIR in 1980, adopting a progressive/underground rock format that lasted roughly a year as "The Wizard." By 1984, it was a rock format as WRXT; the current Top 40/CHR format has been in place since September 1984, with the WKSE calls in place by 1985. Much of its playlist overlapped that of then-sister station Star 102.5 at times. (The two stations' programming eventually fully merged onto WKSE's signal in June 2023 as 102.5 was sold off that month.) WKSE carried the syndicated weekly show The Rockin' America Top 30 Countdown with Scott Shannon throughout the 1980s. Rocky Allen served as the station's morning host in the late 1980s.

Morning host Janet Snyder, the daughter of prominent Buffalo businessman Paul Snyder, joined the station in 1994; she was paired with sidekick Nicholas Picholas for most of that time. Snyder announced her retirement effective May 2026, in a statement released in March of that year. Nikki Preston, a native of nearby Rochester who returns to Western New York following several years hosting in southern California, succeeded Snyder later in 2026. Afternoon host Sue O'Neill had previously held the same position on Star 102.5 until 2023. The remainder of the lineup consists of voice-tracked hosts with generic mononyms, "Julia" (whose show ended in January 2026) and "Bru."

WKSE sold its broadcast tower to Vertical Bridge in March 2019. WKSE continues to use the tower under a leasing arrangement.
