= WWWS =

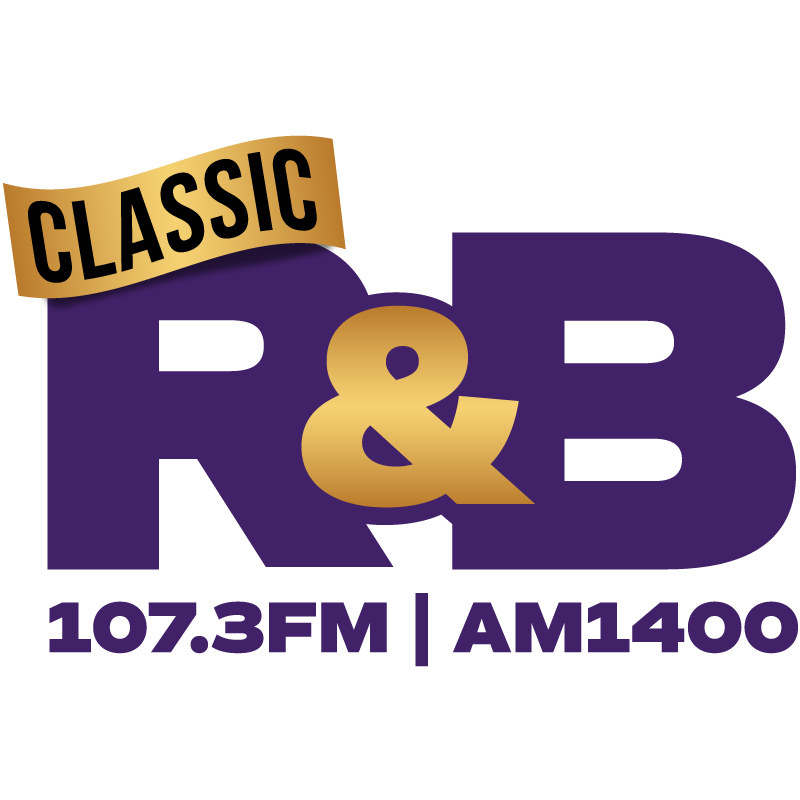

Buffalo, New York; United States
- Broadcast area: Buffalo-Niagara Falls
- Frequency: 1400 kHz
- Branding: Classic R&B 107.3 & 1400 AM

Programming
- Format: Urban oldies
- Affiliations: Westwood One

Ownership
- Owner: Audacy, Inc.; (Audacy License, LLC)
- Sister stations: WBEN; WGR; WGR-FM; WKSE; WWKB

History
- First air date: March 4, 1936
- Former call signs: WBNY (1936–1961); WYSL (1961–1986); WPHD (1986–1988); WGKT (1988–1990); WXBX (1990–1993)
- Former frequencies: 1370 kHz (1936–1941)

Technical information
- Licensing authority: FCC
- Facility ID: 56104
- Class: C
- Power: 745 watts
- Transmitter coordinates: 42°55′34.00″N 78°50′28.00″W
- Translator: 107.3 W297AB (Buffalo)

Links
- Public license information: Public file; LMS
- Webcast: Listen live (via Audacy)
- Website: www.audacy.com/classicrbbuffalo

WWWS (1400 AM) is a radio station broadcasting an urban oldies format. Licensed to Buffalo, New York, United States, the station serves the Buffalo-Niagara Falls area. The station features programming from Westwood One. It is owned and operated by Audacy, Inc. It has a transmitter in Buffalo, east of Delaware Park, while it has studios located on Corporate Parkway in Amherst, New York.

== History ==
WWWS went on the air March 4, 1936, as WBNY, and has featured an assortment of famous radio personalities including John Otto, Danny Neaverth, Doug Tracht (later known as The Greaseman), Casey Kasem. During its tenure, the radio frequency has featured numerous call signs (most notably WYSL, which was the station's calls through the mid-1980s) and disparate formats, ranging from Beautiful Music to Top 40 to Heavy Metal, to its former present format of "Solid Gold Soul".

In the 1960s and early 1970s, the station was owned by top 40 format innovator Gordon McLendon of Dallas, Texas (well known for helming legendary Top 40 stations in the continental U.S. such as KLIF in Dallas, Texas and WAKY in Louisville, Kentucky), whose ownership caused many of its personalities to use the station as a springboard to national or international prominence. Under McLendon's ownership, young personalities who would later become prominent on radio and television in the upstate New York region, including Kevin O'Connell, George Hamberger and Jim McLaughlin, got their first foothold in Buffalo (then a top-20 radio market) at WYSL. The station's ability to develop emerging talent made it competitive in the immediate Buffalo city and inner-ring suburban area despite a weak signal, especially when compared with 50,000 watt format rival WKBW, which could blanket upstate New York by day and the eastern seaboard of North America by night.

In a particularly singular example of the station's wide impact, in 1961, DJ Ron Baxley, after recommendations from McLendon, became program manager during the summer of 1961 for the offshore pirate radio station Radio Nord, beaming broadcasts to Stockholm, Sweden. Radio Nord was financed by McLendon and his business partner, Clint Murchison. (The WYSL calls would end up on a news-talk station in rural Livingston County, serving the nearby Rochester metro area, in 1987, not long after the Buffalo station dropped the call sign.)

In the 1980s, the station was known as "14Rock". From 1987 until late 1988, the station simulcasted sister station WPHD.

In August 1988, WPHD General Manager Harv Moore, hooked up with local radio enthusiasts to program WGKT. This oldies format used some of the local hits, particularly focused on the 1950s and early 1960s. Moore, who was co-hosting the morning show on WPHD FM with Robert Taylor, hired Seth Fenton from WACK in Newark, New York (outside of Rochester) to become the Morning Drive host on 14 Karat Gold. Fenton used the air name of Chip Douglas for his morning show. The "Tiny Tot of the Kilowatt" Art Wander soon became the Afternoon host, as the host of a Sport Call In program featuring discussion about the Bills and Sabres.

WGKT found itself in competition with another newly launched oldies outlet, FM station WHTT, which had the advantage of a stronger, clearer FM signal, the services of Buffalo radio legend Danny Neaverth, and a slightly newer 1960s-centered playlist; these disadvantages were factors in WGKT's short run in the format. Both Fenton and Wander would survive the next programming changes to Rebel Radio.

The frequency is perhaps most infamously known for a one-year period (from September 1990 to September 1991) when it operated as "14X Rebel Radio". Under the call letters WXBX, the station broadcast a mix of hard rock and heavy metal just before Grunge music began to dominate the airwaves. The brunt of the music aired was from Glam metal bands such as Poison, Ratt, Winger, Slaughter, and The Scorpions. Despite the popularity of the format, the timing was bad for this format, hence its brief run. Ted Shredd, the afternoon drive DJ on 14X, would go on to work at WEDG (103.3 The Edge) as part of the popular Shredd and Ragan show. "Meltdown" was one of their full-time DJs, and was well known for his powerful, dynamic, "in your face" voice. Fenton changed his on-air persona from Chip Douglas to "The Fatman" and hosted the morning show until his departure to become Operations Manager at WCJW in Warsaw. In 1991, the station began simulcasting sister station WUFX (which would become WEDG).

In May 1995, WWWS changed from business news to Westwood One's "Urban Gold" format of urban oldies music. The format remains to this day, long after Westwood One discontinued the satellite-fed format, and was known as "Solid Gold Soul".

On December 17, 2018, WWWS rebranded as "Classic R&B 107.3" (simulcasting on translator W297AB (107.3 FM) in Williamsville, which had previously been used to simulcast sister station WLKK).

== Programs ==
WWWS runs an urban oldies/soul music format. It has local jocks Don Robinson, and James Cornelius. WWWS also airs two syndicated shows, "One Pure Soul", and "Inspirations". During the week, the station is automated.

After the CRTC-ordered shutdown of CJRN of Niagara Falls, Ontario, Canada in October 2012, Canisius College athletics broadcasts moved to WWWS; they have since moved again to WECK.

== Other uses ==
The callsign WWWS, which stands for "W-3 Soul", were once used by a station in Saginaw, Michigan, now WTLZ. The station aired a similar format to the current WWWS.
