= WBEN (AM) =

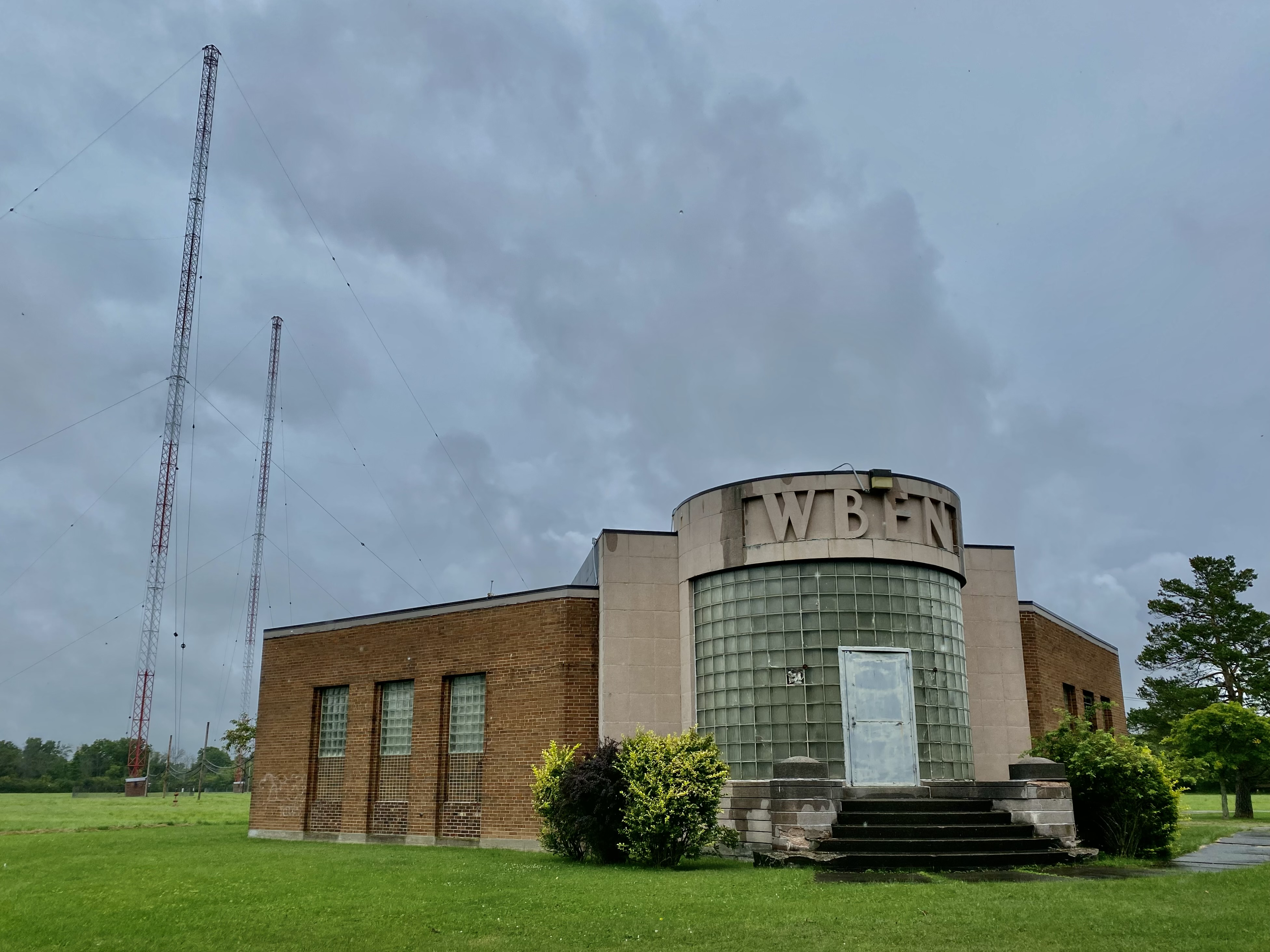
- WBEN's transmitter building and towers in Grand Island, as seen in August 2021
- Buffalo, New York; United States
- Broadcast area: Western New York
- Frequency: 930 kHz
- Branding: NewsRadio 930 WBEN

Programming
- Language: English
- Format: News/talk
- Affiliations: Fox News Radio; Premiere Networks; Radio America; Westwood One; WKBW-TV (weather)

Ownership
- Owner: Audacy, Inc.; (Audacy License, LLC)
- Sister stations: WGR; WGR-FM; WKSE; WWKB; WWWS

History
- Founded: September 22, 1922
- First air date: September 8, 1930
- Former call signs: WMAK (1922–1930)
- Call sign meaning: Buffalo Evening News

Technical information
- Licensing authority: FCC
- Facility ID: 34381
- Class: B
- Power: 5,000 watts (unlimited)
- Transmitter coordinates: 42°58′42.2″N 78°57′26.1″W
- Repeater: 98.5 WKSE-HD3 (Niagara Falls)

Links
- Public license information: Public file; LMS
- Webcast: Listen live (via Audacy)
- Website: www.audacy.com/wben

WBEN (930 kHz) is a commercial news/talk radio station, licensed to serve Buffalo, New York, owned by Audacy, Inc. The station's studios are on Corporate Parkway, off Interstate 290 in Amherst, while its transmitter site is along South Parkway on Grand Island. In addition to a standard analog transmission, WBEN is relayed over 98.5 WKSE's HD3 subchannel, and is available online via Audacy.

Fox News Radio provides national news coverage while WKBW-TV provides weather forecasts. WBEN airs overflow sports programming from WGR, including the NFL on Westwood One Sports and Buffalo Sabres hockey games that are played on the same day as Buffalo Bills football contests. WBEN features local talk hosts during the day, including longtime Buffalo radio personality Tom Bauerle and Medal of Honor recipient David Bellavia along with news magazines in morning and afternoon drive time. Nighttime syndicated programming includes Will Cain Country, Fox Across America with Jimmy Failla, and Coast to Coast AM with George Noory.

== History ==
=== 1920s ===
WBEN has traditionally traced its history to September 8, 1930, the date when it made its first broadcast using the call sign WBEN. However, Federal Communications Commission (FCC) records list the station's first license date as September 22, 1922, tracing WBEN's origin to an earlier license, with the sequentially assigned callsign WMAK, that was issued to Norton Laboratories in Lockport, New York. The station initially used the facility built by the Norton Laboratories organization from Boston as part of an experiment to send amplitude modulated (AM) voice transmissions between Niagara Falls, New York, and Cambridge, Massachusetts.

WMAK was a charter member of the Columbia Broadcasting System (CBS), being one of the 16 stations that aired the first CBS Radio Network program on September 18, 1927. (Note: The other stations were WOR (Newark); WADC (Akron); WAIU (Columbus); WCAO (Baltimore); WCAU (Philadelphia); WEAN (Providence); WGHP (Detroit); WJAS (Pittsburgh); WKRC (Cincinnati); WFBL (Syracuse); WMAQ (Chicago); WNAC (Boston); WOWO (Fort Wayne); KMOX (Saint Louis); and KOIL (Council Bluffs).) In 1928, WMAK joined with General Electric (GE), owner of WGY in Schenectady, to demonstrate television technology. A mechanical scan system with only 30 lines of vertical resolution, it was crude compared to later electronic standards such as the 525-line NTSC analog system and subsequent 1080-line high definition digital television. But the effort was historic because GE's experimental facility was the first American television station with a regular broadcast schedule, as well as the forerunner of the current Capital District CBS-TV affiliate WRGB. The comedy duo of Stoopnagle and Budd began their careers at WMAK in 1930.

When WMAK was launched in 1922, it initially operated on the standard "entertainment" wavelength of 360 meters (833 kHz). In mid-1924 the station was reassigned to 1100 kHz and at the end of the year was shifted again, to 1130 kHz. In late 1927 the transmitter site was changed to Tonawanda, followed a few months later to Shawnee Road in Martinsville. In mid-1927 the station moved to 550 kHz.

Effective November 11, 1928, WMAK was reassigned to 900 kHz, with 750 watts of power, now with a timeshare partner, WFBL in Syracuse, as a result of the Federal Radio Commission's (FRC) General Order 40, which implemented a major realignment of American AM radio. (At this time, WMAK's previous frequency of 550 kHz was assigned to WGR). WMAK was unhappy with this new assignment because the reduced hours limited its ability to carry CBS network programming. WFBL was also unhappy, even though it was also issued an unusual second authorization for unlimited use of 1490 kHz to test "synchronized" transmissions. In practice, WFBL preferred the 900 kHz assignment and only broadcast on 1490 kHz during times when, under the timesharing agreement, 900 kHz was in use by WMAK.

Eventually, a five-way legal battle broke out over control of the 900 kHz assignment. WMAK and WFBL filed applications for full-time use of the frequency, while two other existing stations, WEBR in Buffalo and WBNY in New York City, applied for half-time assignments. A fifth application, made with support from local businesses, came from the Buffalo Evening News newspaper, which filed a request to build a new full-time station. Although it had never operated a radio station, the News had extensive experience supplying a news service to local stations, beginning in November 1920 when it provided election returns for broadcast over an amateur station operated by Charles C. Klinck, Jr. The News also had a contract to supply news for use by the Buffalo Broadcasting Company stations, however, a dispute led to the station group canceling the contract in September 1929.

The five competing station applications were evaluated at a Federal Radio Commission hearing on December 18, 1929. The FRC issued its ruling two days later, denying the WMAK, WFBL, WEBR, and WBNY applications while ordering WFBL to transmit exclusively on 1490 kHz. It also granted the Buffalo Evening News request to build a new 1,000-watt station on 900 kHz with unlimited hours. In early 1929 WMAK had been acquired by the Buffalo Broadcasting Company, based at Buffalo's Rand Building, which also controlled WGR and WKBW in Buffalo and WKEN in nearby Kenmore. The FRC saw this as pertinent to its decision, stating "There existed in Buffalo, New York, a virtual monopoly of broadcasting facilities controlled by the Buffalo Broadcasting Corporation by reason of which Buffalo and the surrounding community were given radio broadcasting service... of an unstable and unsatisfactory nature", therefore "the greatest benefit to the greatest number would result from granting the application of the Buffalo Evening News". A construction permit to build the new station on 900 kHz, with a sequentially assigned provisional call sign of WRDA, was issued on January 23, 1930, specifying a transmitter site in Orchard Park and studios in Buffalo.

=== 1930s ===
Both WMAK and WFBL appealed this ruling. WFBL complained that 1490 kHz was an "undesirable" assignment, and the FRC eventually agreed for the station to use 1360 kHz instead. Following plaintiff arguments, but prior to the appeals court making a ruling, the Buffalo Evening News and the Buffalo Broadcasting Company devised a settlement, and agreed that instead of building a completely new station, the newspaper would purchase WMAK and upgrade its existing transmitter site. The assignment of WMAK's license to the Buffalo Evening News was made on June 25, 1930, and WMAK's callsign was changed to WBEN. The original construction permit for a (never built) new station was modified to specify that it was now an upgrade to the existing Martinsville transmitter site. (Note: The "WRDA" call letters initially assigned to the construction permit were never used.) At the same time, WMAK's call sign and intellectual property were transferred to the former WKEN in Kenmore, where it would operate until its deletion in 1932. (Note: The FRC ordered WMAK deleted because "no need was found for the service rendered" by the station and also because under the provisions of the Davis Amendment, the state of New York had an excess of radio stations. Following the repeal of the Davis Amendment, in 1948 WMAK's vacated frequency assignment was licensed to a new station in Kenmore, now WUFO in Amherst.)

WBEN remained off the air while the upgrades were being made, until it made its debut broadcast on September 8. A new studio complex was built at the Statler-Hilton Hotel in downtown Buffalo, chosen primarily for access to the live orchestra there, which served WBEN, its sister FM station, and a television station opened in the spring of 1948, for more than 25 years.

In 1934, WBEN continued the station's tradition of innovation, launching the ultra-shortwave experimental station W8XH on the Apex radio band, as the first station of its kind to broadcast a regular schedule. In December 1938, WBEN began an experimental facsimile service, transmitting overnight newspaper extracts printed with special receivers in subscribing homes. In April 1939, the facsimile service was transferred to an "experimental facsimile broadcasting station", W8XA, which employed much of the equipment originally used by W8XH. The facsimile service was ended in December 1940.

=== 1940s ===
In 1941, WBEN moved to 930 kHz as a result of the North American Regional Broadcasting Agreement (NARBA) reassignments. The station also relocated its transmitter to Grand Island at this time, increasing full-time power to 5,000 watts. The Grand Island transmitter and two towers are still in use today.

Buffalo, in general, and WBEN in particular, was an incubator of national radio and television talent. In the early 1940s, WBEN's morning host was comedian and future national late-night television star Jack Paar (he left the station when drafted into the military in 1943 during World War II and opted not to return to Buffalo after the war). Paar's place was taken by Clint Buehlman, who was recruited from competing station WGR. Buehlman remained for 34 years until retiring in 1977.

WBEN was also the station where longtime national commercial spokesman Ed Reimers launched his career, In 1946, WBEN was one of the first radio stations in the United States to launch an FM radio station, which originally was located at 106.5 MHz on the dial. In May 1948, it launched WBEN-TV (channel 4), the first television station in Buffalo and the second in Upstate New York, following WRGB in Schenectady–Albany. The original WBEN-FM would later move to 102.5, increase its signal strength to 110 kilowatts to become the most powerful FM station in New York State, and eventually become WBKV.

=== 1950s-1960s ===
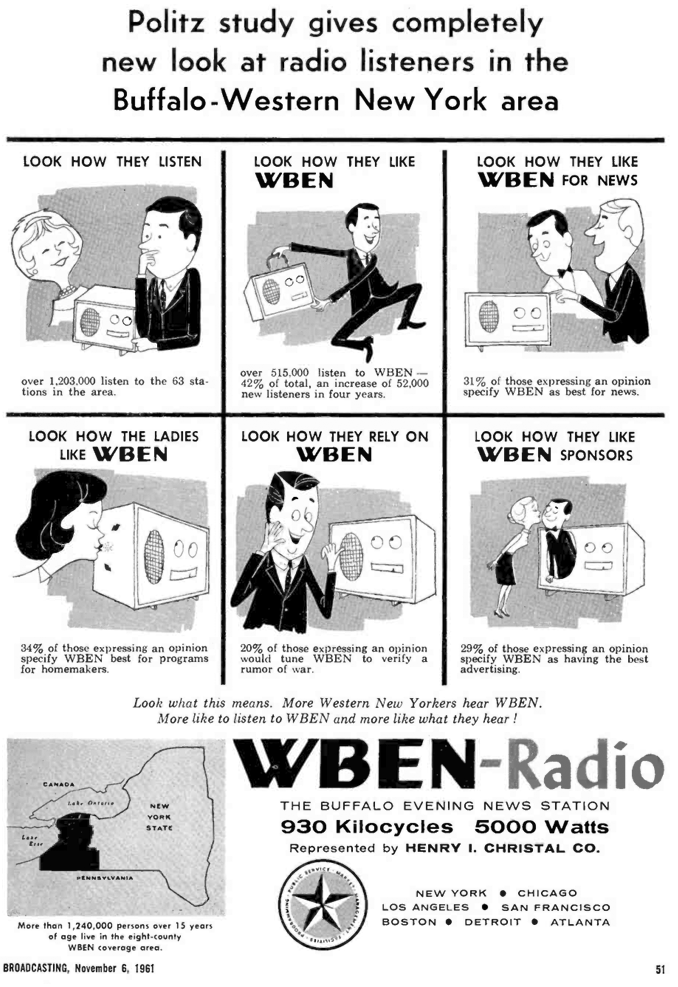
1961 station advertisement.

As many national network radio programs moved to television, WBEN shifted to a middle-of-the-road format and developed a stable talent to lead the market in ratings. The station's affiliation with CBS brought Arthur Godfrey, "The World Tonight" and other network programming, but the station was primarily live and local.

In addition to morning host Clint Buehlman, other on-air voices included Al Fox, John Corbett, Ken Phillips, Bill Masters, and John Luther. Sports personalities Van Miller, Stan Barron and Dick Rifenburg shared various duties, including hosting and interview programs, while familiar news voices Jack Ogilvie, Gene Kelley, Lou Douglas, Virgil Booth, and others were heard during this period. Most of these personnel also handled TV duties, anchoring, announcing the news, weather, and sports, and hosting game shows and other programming at WBEN-TV.

=== 1970s-1980s ===
When the Federal Communications Commission (FCC) disallowed same market co-ownership of newspapers and broadcast licenses in the early 1970s, the combination of the Buffalo Evening News and the WBEN stations was grandfathered under the new rule. However, the 1974 death of Katherine Butler (longtime owner and publisher of the Evening News) led to the placement of the Evening News's properties in a blind trust (since Katherine Butler left no heirs). This trust company then sold the newspaper. This sale ended the Butler family's ownership of the Evening News. With the loss of the WBEN stations' grandfathered protection, WBEN-TV was sold to newspaper publisher Robert Howard. WBEN-TV's new owner changed channel 4's callsign to WIVB-TV, which stands for "We're IV (4) Buffalo".

By the time of this transition period, WBEN radio's demographics had grown older with its folksy personalities and middle-of-the-road music. With the Butler family no longer owning the newspaper or broadcast properties, WBEN attempted to contemporize the sound during the mid-late 1970s by firing some of its longtime on-air institutions, hiring DJs, and playing Top 40 music. The station went from being known as "WBEN Radio 9-3-0" to "93/WBEN". DJs Jay Fredericks (Fritz Coleman), Chris Tyler, and Charlie Warren joined the station from other markets. Within months the ratings dropped as longtime listeners were angered, yet Top 40 listeners were already entrenched at WKBW and WYSL. Jefferson Kaye, however, had remained successful as the afternoon personality during this period (he succeeded the retiring Clint Buehlman as a morning show host in 1977; Buehlman's retirement was in part prompted by poor reviews for his handling of coverage of the Great Lakes Blizzard of 1977). Buehlman's 34-year run at the station was the longest in WBEN history, a benchmark that would eventually be surpassed by Susan Rose in 2019. Kaye, who had been program director of crosstown rival WKBW, originally came to Buffalo via WBZ in Boston.

As the newspaper and TV station became part of other companies, WBEN-AM-FM were sold to Algonquin Broadcasting, a company led by longtime Buffalo radio executive Laurence "Larry" Levite. Levite assembled a group of managers and talent that returned WBEN to prominence. The line-up was changed, and the format shifted from full service, playing Top 40 to full service with adult contemporary music. Jefferson Kaye hosted mornings, while Larry Hunter, Bill Lacey, and Kevin O'Connell and Tom Kelly were heard on middays, and Jack Mindy hosted afternoons. Stan Barron returned to the station, bringing back his "Free-Form Sports" program, and overnights eventually shifted from Dick Rifenburg's music show to Mutual's syndicated Larry King talk show. Bob Wood served as the station's program director. Helicopter traffic reports were added, featuring reporters Dave May and Debbie Stamp, the news department staff was increased - and Levite brought Buffalo Bills broadcasts back to WBEN after a three-year hiatus on WKBW. Van Miller also returned to the Bills' broadcast booth, replacing WKBW announcer Al Meltzer. WBEN, WJYE (with a beautiful music format), and Top 40 outlet WKBW all fought for the top spot during this era, but WBEN had consistently solidified the number one position by 1980. Stan Barron died in 1984 and was succeeded by John Murphy. By the mid-1980s, Kaye departed WBEN's morning show, moving to Philadelphia to become the voice of NFL Films and WPVI-TV. Midday host Bill Lacy, later joined by Kevin Keenan, assumed morning hosting duties.

=== 1990s ===
Former logo, used from c. 1990 to 2011

The station won numerous regional and statewide awards for its news and public-service efforts. Levite presided over the gradual transition of WBEN from an adult contemporary station to a news and talk format. The local talk continued, along with the addition of Rush Limbaugh. In 1994, Levite sold the WBEN stations to Kerby Confer's Keymarket Communications organization and retired from the broadcasting business (Levite later moved to print media and took over the monthly Buffalo Spree magazine until his 2017 death). Keymarket later sold the properties to River City Broadcasting, which then merged with Sinclair Broadcast Group. In 1999, Entercom Communications bought WBEN, as well as its competitor WGR and most of Sinclair's other radio stations as Sinclair exited the radio business.

=== 2000-2010 ===
WBEN and WGR had been competing for news/talk/sports stations during the 1990s. In 2000, under common ownership, the stations rearranged personnel. WGR became the market's sports radio station, while WBEN became the market's principal commercial news/talk station.

With sister station WGR's move to sports talk, WBEN solidified its position as the dominant news/talk station. Market veterans John Zach and Susan Rose replaced Bill Lacy (who hosted mornings at WHTT until 2022) to host "Buffalo's Morning News". Tom Bauerle moved from WGR to host a mid-morning talk show, Limbaugh's program continued, and market veteran Sandy Beach—who had been primarily a music disc jockey for the previous 20 years, but had grown tired of what he called "playing doo-wop diddy" and wanted to try another style— moved from sister station WMJQ to host afternoon talk on the station, while evening hours were filled by syndicated lifestyle hosts Laura Schlessinger and Joy Browne; Browne and Schlessinger were later replaced by The Sean Hannity Show and Jim Bohannon, respectively.

=== 2010–present ===
From April 5, 2011, to September 26, 2013, Entercom switched its classic rock/adult album alternative hybrid sister station WLKK to a simulcast of WBEN. Entercom's WLKK was not able to assume the call sign WBEN-FM, since the company had previously released the rights to a station in Philadelphia. The "Lake" format continued on WLKK's HD2 digital subchannel.

In July 2013, WBEN made its first major change to its daytime lineup in over a decade. The lineup change moved afternoon drive host Sandy Beach to midday, while midday host Tom Bauerle moved to afternoon drive and expanded his show to four hours. The station's evening news magazine, Buffalo's Evening News (which incorporated a simulcast of the first part of the CBS Evening News), was canceled as part of the expansion, a move made to better coordinate with Arbitron's dayparting practices. After a very brief stint in which David Bellavia filled the shift from 10 p.m. to 1 a.m., the station added The Savage Nation to its syndicated offerings in early 2014. It was explained at the time that Bellavia's other employer objected to him being on WBEN, so Savage was replacement programming for that slot. Bellavia would return in late 2016 as Bauerle's co-host and eventually moved to middays with his own show in 2020. Bauerle's show was cut back to three hours in 2018 as part of a contract extension. Buffalo's Evening News would be revived in 2021 after the death of Rush Limbaugh. WBEN's parent company also added Dana Loesch on a tape-delay, which was dropped two years later in favor of an even further tape-delayed airing of Armstrong & Getty.

"Cinema Bob" Stilson, Entercom's creative services director, had a one-hour "Movie Show" that discussed upcoming theatrical releases and aired Fridays during Beach's program from 1997 until Entercom cut Stilson's budget and ended the program in 2017; Stilson later joined WEBR in 2020. Morning host John Zach was permanently laid off at the end of 2016 and later emerged at WECK. Until 2016, WBEN carried news from CBS News Radio, an affiliation the station had held for 76 years. Sandy Beach, whose Beach and Company show had been part of the WBEN lineup since 1997, announced his departure from the station in July 2020. It would be Beach's last job before his death in August 2026. As of 2025, much of WBEN's "local" talk programming, including Bauerle and Bellavia's shows, originate from the hosts' home studios in Florida.

On July 1, 2025, WBEN changed its network newscasts at the top and bottom of the hour to Fox News Radio. It dropped Armstrong & Getty and Our American Stories for Fox News Radio programs Will Cain Country and Fox Across America with Jimmy Failla. The switch to Fox was an effort to block an upstart competitor, WUSW, from securing the affiliation for itself.

Longtime program director Tim Wenger, the husband of morning host Susan Rose, announced his departure in June 2026 as part of a restructuring at Audacy. (Note: Entercom changed its name to Audacy on March 30, 2021.) Two months later, longtime host Tom Bauerle announced that he was no longer employed with the station following the expiration of his contract and Audacy's failure to agree to an extension. After briefly contemplating retirement, Bauerle indicated in a post to social media that he would "be a competitor" to WBEN in his next project. Bauerle reversed course by late September and stated that he was done with conservative talk radio, which he saw as a dying format.

Today, WBEN competes with country-formatted WYRK for the leadership in total audience in most quarterly ratings surveys.

Portions of the above come from the Buffalo Broadcast Pioneers Web site.

== Simulcasts ==
WBEN operated an experimental Apex band station, W8XH, from 1934 to 1940. Between 1946 and 1960, WBEN simulcast on co-owned WBEN-FM, which started on 106.5 MHz. From 1960 (when the station moved to 102.5 MHz) until 1973, the morning show continued to be simulcast.The 106.5 frequency was reallocated, switching its call letters to WADV and eventually WYRK. The co-owned TV station, WBEN-TV, was sold separately to become WIVB-TV in 1977. WBEN-FM later became WMJQ in 1987, WTSS in 2000, and—after WBEN's parent company sold 102.5 to a religious broadcaster in 2023—WBKV.

On April 5, 2011, WBEN began simulcasting on co-owned FM station WLKK at 107.7 MHz, relayed by translator W297AB at 107.3 MHz from Williamsville, New York. On September 26, 2013, WLKK dropped the simulcast.

WBEN was simulcast on the second HD Radio subchannel of WTSS from 2011 to 2015. It is now heard on the HD3 subchannel of WKSE 98.5 MHz.

== See also ==
- List of oldest radio stations
- List of radio stations in New York State
