= Mass media in Buffalo, New York =

This is a list of mass media in Buffalo, New York, United States.

== Radio ==
=== AM ===
- 550 WGR Buffalo (Sports)
- 770 WTOR Youngstown (Brokered/South Asian)
- 930 WBEN Buffalo (Talk radio)
- 970 WDCZ Buffalo (Christian/WDCX simulcast)
- 1080 WUFO Amherst (Urban AC/classic hip-hop)
- 1120 WBBF Buffalo (ESPN Radio)
- 1230 WECK Cheektowaga (Oldies)
- 1270 WUSW Niagara Falls (Adult country)
- 1300 WXRL Lancaster (Classic country)
- 1340 WLVL Lockport (Talk radio)
- 1400 WWWS Buffalo (Rhythmic oldies)
- 1440 WEBR Niagara Falls (Soft adult contemporary)
- 1520 WWKB Buffalo (Sports betting)

=== FM ===
- 88.3 WCOU Attica (Family Life Network)
- 88.7 WBFO Buffalo (National Public Radio)
- 89.9 WBWA Buffalo (Air1)
- 90.7 WLGU Lancaster (CSN International)
- 90.9 WLNF Rapids (Public access)
- 91.3 WBNY Buffalo (College/Buffalo State College)
- 92.1 WZDV Amherst (Christian)
- 92.9 WBUF Buffalo (Mainstream rock)
- 93.7 WBLK Depew (Urban contemporary)
- 94.5 WNED-FM Buffalo (Classical music)
- 96.1 WTSS Buffalo (Hot adult contemporary)
- 96.9 WGRF Buffalo (Classic rock)
- 98.5 WKSE Niagara Falls (Contemporary hit radio)
- 99.5 WDCX-FM Buffalo (Christian)
- 101.7 WLOF Elma (Catholic/The Station of the Cross)
- 102.5 WBKV Buffalo (K-Love)
- 103.3 WEDG Buffalo (Alternative rock)
- 104.1 WHTT-FM Buffalo (Classic hits)
- 106.5 WYRK Buffalo (Country)
- 107.7 WGR-FM Wethersfield (Sports-WGR simulcast)

Buffalo is noted for having the highest per capita listenership of AM radio in the United States, with a majority of Buffalo radio listeners tuning in at least one AM signal at some point in June 2023.

Radio stations from Toronto can also be heard in some parts of the area. CJED-FM and CFLZ-FM have a city-grade signal of Buffalo and nearby suburbs, while the latter's transmitter is located less than 5 miles away from downtown. Rimshot signals from Rochester are also sometimes audible in Buffalo.

Energy Radio Buffalo previously operated a rimshot signal targeting Buffalo from Little Valley using the signal of WGWE; it continues to operate as a webcast.

== Television ==
=== Full-power ===
- 2 WGRZ Buffalo (NBC)
- 4 WIVB-TV Buffalo (CBS)
- 7 WKBW-TV Buffalo (ABC)
- 17 WNED-TV Buffalo (PBS)
- 23 WNLO Buffalo (The CW)**
- 26 WNYB Jamestown (TCT)**
- 29 WUTV Buffalo (Fox)
- 49 WNYO-TV Buffalo (Independent with MyNetworkTV)
- 51 WPXJ Batavia (Ion Television)

=== Low-power ===
- 15 WBNF-CD Buffalo
- 20 WWHC-LD Olean
- 30 WBUO-LD Buffalo
- 34 WVTT-CD Olean
- 56 WBXZ-LD Buffalo
- 67 WBBZ Springville (MeTV)

=== Off-air ===
MSG Western New York, a regional sports network, is the only cable network primarily operating from and serving the Buffalo area. Spectrum News 1 Buffalo (formerly YNN and Time Warner Cable News) primarily serves Buffalo from locations throughout New York State. Channels that have previously been headquartered in Buffalo include Pinwheel/Nickelodeon (1979 to 1981), Empire Sports Network (1991 to 2005), Bridges TV (2004 to 2012), and Time Warner Cable SportsNet (later Spectrum Sports, 2007 to 2017).

In addition, Buffalo residents can also pick-up stations from the neighbouring Greater Toronto Area with a suitable aerial antenna or cable subscription. CTV flagship station CFTO/Toronto and CBC flagship CBLT/Toronto have historically been carried on Charter/Spectrum and Atlantic Broadband in the immediate Buffalo/Niagara Falls areas, according to their channel lineups.

== Newspapers ==
- Am-Pol Eagle (a Polish-American weekly)
- Artvoice (a weekly alternative newspaper)
- The Beast (a left-libertarian biweekly)
- Brainstream Media (an alternative right-libertarian newspaper covering local news and issues, serving most of the Buffalo metropolitan area as a printed newspaper for over one year, now offered only online)
- Buffalo Courier-Express (ceased publication in 1982)
- The Buffalo Enquirer (1891–1926), a former daily newspaper
- Buffalo Irish Times (an Irish-American bimonthly)
- Buffalo Latino Village (Puerto Rican-Latino newspaper published in Buffalo & Erie County) buffalolatinovillage.com
- The Buffalo News (the region's main paper)
- The Buffalo Times (daily newspaper published in Buffalo & Erie County from 1921 to 1939)
- Buffalo Rising began as a monthly publication and is now solely online.
- Business First of Buffalo (a weekly business publication)
- Community Papers of Western New York (the region's main community newspaper covering hyper-local news)
- Erie County Fire Blotter (a website that covers the Buffalo Fire Department and other fire departments in Erie County on a daily basis)
- The German Citizen (a German-American bimonthly)
- Loop (a monthly in-print and online publication catering to the region's LGBT community)
- Outcome Buffalo (a monthly gay, lesbian, bisexual and transgender – GLBT – newspaper serving the Buffalo Metro area)
- PoliticsNY.net (founded and run by Joseph Illuzzi until his death, an Internet and formerly print newsletter; now owned and operated by Republican political operative Michael Caputo)
- The Public (founded by former employees of Artvoice)
- The Record (the Buffalo State College student-run newspaper)
- South Buffalo Online Covering the South Buffalo, West Seneca and Lackawanna area for community news and info
- The Spectrum (the University at Buffalo student-run newspaper)

== Magazines ==
- Buffalo, published by The Buffalo News
- Buffalo Rising [online]
- Buffalo Spree
- CannaBuff Magazine
- Cornelia
- Loop
- No Boundaries
- Peach Mag
- Welcome 716
- WNY Heritage, quarterly historical publication

== Film industry ==
Though Buffalo is not a major center of film production, the Buffalo Niagara Film Commission exists to promote and assist with filmmaking in the area. The non-profit Buffalo International Film Festival helps to highlight the work of Buffalonians associated with the film industry. Squeaky Wheel, a non-profit media arts center, provides access for local media artists to video and film equipment, as well as screenings of independent and avant-garde films.

=== Films set, or filmed, in the Buffalo area ===
A number films have been set or filmed in the Buffalo area. A more complete list of films related to or based in Buffalo can be found at IMDb.

- After the Sun Fell – set and filmed in Buffalo, Niagara Falls, and the surrounding area.
- The American Side (2016) – set and filmed in Buffalo, Niagara Falls, and the surrounding area.
- A Quiet Place Part II (2020) – filmed in Buffalo, and the surrounding area.
- Battledogs – filmed in Buffalo
- Best Friends – filmed in Buffalo in 1982
- Bruce Almighty (2003) – starring Jim Carrey and Jennifer Aniston; set in Buffalo; parts of the movie are set in the real-life TV station WKBW
- The Buddy Holly Story – depicts the name "The Crickets" being bestowed upon Buddy's group by Buffalo disk jockey 'Madman' Mancuso
- Buffalo '66 – set and filmed in Buffalo
- Buffalo Bushido – set and filmed in Buffalo in 2007
- Canadian Bacon – although largely set in nearby Niagara Falls, had significant scenes in Buffalo
- Category 7: The End of the World – Buffalo is destroyed by tornadoes
- Crimson Peak – The beginning of the film is set in Buffalo in 1901
- Evan Almighty – beginning of the movie was set in Buffalo
- The Falls – shot in and takes place in Buffalo
- Henry's Crime (2010) – romantic comedy produced by and starring Keanu Reeves; takes place in Buffalo; features Reeves's character robbing the Buffalo Savings Bank
- Hide in Plain Sight – set and filmed in Buffalo
- Jump Tomorrow – filmed in Buffalo in 2001
- Limestone Burning – set in Buffalo and Niagara Falls, and was filmed on location in 2012
- Manna from Heaven – set and filmed in Buffalo
- The Natural – while not set in Buffalo, was mostly filmed there
- Nightmare Alley – set in Buffalo, and parts were filmed in Buffalo right before the COVID-19 Pandemic
- Planes, Trains & Automobiles – starring Steve Martin and John Candy; the automobile scenes were filmed along U.S. Route 219, south of Buffalo
- Poultrygeist: Night of the Chicken Dead – a Troma film shot in Buffalo at an old McDonald's location on Bailey Avenue
- Poundcake – set and filmed in Buffalo in 2006
- A Princess for Christmas – a Michael Damian film which takes place in Buffalo at the beginning of the movie.
- Prison of the Psychotic Damned – a horror picture which takes place in the old Buffalo Central Terminal
- Proud – filmed in Elmira and Buffalo in 2004
- The Savages – starring Philip Seymour Hoffman, filmed throughout Buffalo in the spring of 2006
- Second String – set in Buffalo
- Shadow Creature – filmed in Buffalo; directed by James Gribbins of Gribbins Films
- Sharknado 2: The Second One a (2014) made-for-TV movie was set in NYC but used several scenes filmed in downtown Buffalo
- Slime City – filmed in Buffalo in 1988
- Stepping Out – set and partially filmed in Buffalo
- Stiletto Dance – starring Eric Roberts as a Buffalo cop trying to foil a Russian mafia-nuclear weapon deal; set and filmed in Buffalo in 2001
- You Kill Me – half set in Buffalo, although it was mostly filmed in Winnipeg

=== TV shows set in the Buffalo area ===
- Disco Step-by-Step (1977–1980) - dance television show - Taped live mainly at the Club 747 disco in Buffalo
- Buffalo Bill (1983–1984)
- Confessions of a Matchmaker (2007)
- Cutters (1993)
- Fraternity Life: Buffalo (2003)
- Jesse (1998–2000) – starring Christina Applegate, based in and partially filmed in Buffalo
- Off Beat Cinema
- Good Deeds Buffalo
- Super Fun Night – the lead character of the series is from the Buffalo suburb of Tonawanda; series is set in New York City
- The Winner (2007)

At least 2 episodes of Supernatural have been set in or near Buffalo episode 6.08 and 3.03
