= WHTT (disambiguation) =

WHTT refers to the following broadcasting stations in the United States:

- WHTT-FM, a radio station (FM 104.1 MHz) licensed to Buffalo, New York
- WXLP, a radio station (FM 96.9 MHz) licensed to Moline, Illinois, which held the call sign WHTT from 1975 to 1978
- WSUA, a radio station (AM 1260 kHz) licensed to Miami, Florida, which held the call sign WHTT from July 30, 1980 to January 6, 1983
- WBGB (FM), a radio station (FM 103.3 MHz) licensed to Boston, Massachusetts, which held the call sign WHTT from March 9, 1983 to July 7, 1986
- WBBF, a radio station (AM 1120 kHz) licensed to Buffalo, New York, which held the call sign WHTT from 1986 to 1987, and again from 1988 to 1999
