= Tom Clay =

American radio personality and disc jockey

- Clay in 1964 at the time he left CKLW
- Born: Thomas Clague; August 20, 1929; New York City, U.S.
- Died: November 22, 1995 (aged 66); Los Angeles, California, U.S.
- Occupations: Radio personality; disc jockey

Tom Clay (born Thomas Clague; August 20, 1929 – November 22, 1995) was an American radio personality and disc jockey.

Clay was born in New York, and in the 1950s he was popular in the Detroit area on WJBK-AM both as a DJ, and for his on-air comic characterizations; he became a local celebrity. In the early 1950s Clay, using the pseudonym "Guy King", "The Clay" or "The magnificent Tom" worked for WWOL-AM/FM in Buffalo, New York; on July 3, 1955, he conducted a stunt in which he played "Rock Around the Clock" by Bill Haley & His Comets repeatedly from atop a billboard in Buffalo's Shelton Square, an incident that led to his firing and arrest (Danny Neaverth later repeated Clay's stunt but did not suffer the same consequences). In the mid-1950s he moved to Cincinnati, Ohio, and was equally popular.

He was caught up in the payola scandal of the late 1950s, and admitted to having accepted thousands of dollars for playing certain records. After being fired from WJBK, Clay worked at the short-lived Detroit Top 40 station WQTE (now WRDT) only to be fired again when the station changed format to easy listening music in 1961. After moving to Los Angeles to work at KDAY, Clay returned to the Detroit area and found work at CKLW in neighboring Windsor, Ontario, at the time one of the foremost Top 40 AM stations in North America.

According to the book Rockin' Down the Dial, a history of Detroit Top 40 radio of the 1950s and 1960s by David Carson, Clay became friendly with Marilyn Monroe during his time in Los Angeles in the early 1960s. Clay's daughter, Kimberly, told Carson that her father never revealed much about his friendship with Monroe, but would only say that she seemed very lonely.

Riding the wave of early Beatlemania he again rose in popularity, met and interviewed The Beatles. He was fired over a scheme in which he invited listeners to send in one dollar for membership in a "Beatles Booster Club", an essentially non-existent organization which had no benefits beyond a promised membership card or decal. According to fellow CKLW DJ Dave Shafer (also now deceased), Clay also promised each listener who sent in a dollar a personal item used by one of the Beatles; these "personal items" turned out to be items such as cigarette butts and used tissues, and other listeners claimed to have received nothing. However, since over 80,000 fans responded, Clay was able to live comfortably for a time on the cash that appeared in his personal post office box. Dave Shafer told David Carson in Rockin' Down the Dial that Clay skipped town in the wake of the Beatles Booster fiasco, leading to Shafer's being briefly jailed on charges of international fraud. Clay eventually returned to work at other Detroit area radio stations, including WWWW-FM, and also worked at WCBS-FM in New York. In 1984, he played pop standards at KPRZ, Los Angeles.

External image
- The cover of Tom Clay's 1971 LP What the World Needs Now.

Clay is best remembered for his single on Motown's MoWest label "What the World Needs Now Is Love"/"Abraham, Martin and John" (MoWest MW5002F). The record is a compilation of clips from the two popular songs, with an overlay of interviews with small children (who cannot pronounce, let alone define, segregation nor bigotry), news reports, and speeches of Martin Luther King Jr. and brothers John and Robert Kennedy, emphasizing tolerance and civil rights. It went to #8 on the Billboard Hot 100. It sold over one million copies, and was awarded a gold disc. The single peaked at number 3 in Australia in August 1971.

A follow-up album had respectable sales, but another single, "Whatever Happened to Love" (MoWest MW5007F), flopped, and Clay found himself unemployed. Both songs were featured on the MoWest album What the World Needs Now (MS 103-L, released August 1971). Clay finished his career doing voiceover work.

Clay died of stomach and lung cancer at the age of 66, in Valley Village, Los Angeles, California, on November 22, 1995.

== See also ==
- List of 1970s one-hit wonders in the United States
