= The War of the Worlds (1968 radio drama) =

1968 radio drama

The War of the Worlds (WKBW radio)
- Genre: Radio drama, Horror
- Running time: 78 minutes; (1968); (11:00 pm – 12:18 am)
- Country of origin: United States
- Language: English
- Home station: WKBW 1520 AM
- Hosted by: Danny Neaverth (1968); Jefferson Kaye (1971 and 1973)
- Starring: Jefferson Kaye; Irv Weinstein; Joe Downey; Henry Brach; John Irving; Jim Fagan; Don Lancer; Sandy Beach (1968); Jackson Armstrong (1971); Ron Baskin (1973 and 1975); Shane Brother Shane (1973); Jim Quinn (1975)
- Announcer: Danny Neaverth (1968); Jefferson Kaye (subsequent versions)
- Created by: H. G. Wells (original story); Orson Welles (original radio drama); Jefferson Kaye (1968)
- Directed by: Danny Kriegler
- Original release: October 31, 1968 (original and subsequent versions rebroadcast every Halloween)
- No. of series: 5 renditions (1968, 1971, 1973, 1975, 1998)
- No. of episodes: 1
- Opening theme: None (voiced over by Neaverth in 1968, Kaye in later versions)
- Ending theme: None
- Sponsored by: AM&A's (1968)

The War of the Worlds was a radio drama, originally aired by Buffalo, New York radio station WKBW 1520 on October 31, 1968. It was a modernized version of the original radio drama aired by CBS in 1938.

Danny Kriegler served as the director of the radio drama while Jefferson Kaye served as its producer.

The broadcast, its subsequent re-airings and remakes, and multiple airings alongside the original 1938 radio drama made Buffalo, New York the War of the Worlds Radio Capital of The World in a 2009 resolution by the New York State Senate

== Development ==
=== Background ===
WKBW program director Jefferson Kaye, a big fan of the original Orson Welles version from three decades earlier, wondered what The War of the Worlds would sound like if it was made using up-to-date (for 1968) radio news equipment, covering the "story" of a Martian invasion. Until this point, most radio renditions of the 1938 broadcast were simply script re-readings with different actors or had minor variations to account for significantly different geographical locations. Kaye decided to disregard the original script entirely, move the action to Grand Island, New York, and use actual WKBW disc jockeys and news reporters as actors. Other changes reflected the changing state of the industry: instead of the old-time radio programming fare of the 1930s, WKBW's War of the Worlds broadcast was interwoven into the station's top 40 programming.

=== Production ===
Initially, a script was written for the news reporters to act out; however, upon hearing the rehearsals, it was evident that the news reporters (except Irv Weinstein, a professional radio actor at the beginning of his career) were not adept at scripted radio acting. So instead, Kaye wrote an outline based on the events that were to occur, and the news reporters were then asked to describe the events as they would covering an actual news story. The results were much more realistic for its time, and this was the process used for the actual broadcast.

== Broadcast ==
The play began a few minutes before 11:00 pm ET with a somber introduction by Danny Neaverth tackling the comparison of radio broadcast technology during the original broadcast and the upcoming production. Neaverth later restated the forewarning of the broadcast's fictitious nature.

The initial part of the broadcast alternated from top-40 hits to news break-ins and back until 11:30 ET when continuous reportage and worsening situations on the ground take over. One by one, radio and TV newsmen are killed off, from Jim Fagan until Jefferson Kaye. After Kaye's character dies, Neaverth returns again with his closing speech taken from the novel's epilogue.

=== Cast ===
These personnel participated in the 1968 broadcast, listed as first heard on the play:

- Top-of-the-hour newscaster – Joe Downey
- Deejay – Sandy Beach
- Studio anchors (continuous coverage, in successive order) – Joe Downey, Henry Brach, and Jefferson Kaye
- Reporters – Jim Fagan and Don Lancer (WKBW-AM), John Irving and Irv Weinstein (WKBW-TV)

== Aftermath and legacy ==
=== Reaction ===
Despite an exhaustive advertising campaign by WKBW for this show, several people were still convinced upon listening to it that the events unfolding in the show were genuine. Among those fooled included a local newspaper, several small-town police officers, and even the Canadian military, which dispatched troops to the Peace Bridge. The Air Force Base (ADC) attached to the Niagara Falls International Airport received several dozen calls from concerned citizens (Is there an alert?, invasion?, Are we under attack? What is the Air Force going to do?, etc), much to the amusement of the airmen manning the switchboard, who were aware of the broadcast. They explained it was a special Halloween broadcast, and to listen for the disclaimers the station was airing periodically. Although the public concern over the legitimacy of the broadcast was not as great as was alleged in 1938 (and even that may have been overstated due to an ongoing feud between newspapers and radio at the time), creator Kaye and director Dan Kriegler feared that they were going to lose their jobs as a result of the broadcast; Kaye claimed that he actually submitted his resignation, certain that he was going to be fired the next day. However, no one involved in the broadcast was fired and the resignation was not accepted. Part of the reason for the elevated concern, even compared to the original, was that although the Welles broadcast aired on a little-heard program with no sponsors, WKBW was one of the most-listened-to stations in Western New York at the time, with a 50,000 watt signal audible throughout eastern North America during the broadcast.

==== Disclaimers ====
During the broadcast, the show was interrupted every few minutes with commercials from AM&A's and other sponsors, ending with the disclaimer that it was just a dramatization. However, at four minutes before midnight, Jefferson Kaye interrupted the taped events to give this disclaimer, but not until after he threatened director Danny Kriegler that he would rip the still-playing tape off its machine and run along Buffalo's Main Street with it if he was not allowed to break in, as the number of calls received by the station from frightened listeners were getting out of hand:

What you are listening to is a dramatization of H.G. Wells' War of the Worlds on WKBW radio, 1520 on your Buffalo dial. I repeat, it is a dramatization; it is a play. It is not happening in any way, shape or form. What you are listening to is a dramatization of H.G. Wells' War of the Worlds as being portrayed on WKBW 1520 Buffalo. The time is two and one half minutes before twelve o'clock.

=== Subsequent remakes within and outside Buffalo ===
1971: Jackson Armstrong was the DJ at the beginning of this broadcast replacing Sandy Beach. This version was edited down to 63 minutes from the 78-minute original. Kaye reprised Danny Neaverth's role in the 1968 broadcast, but added more emphasis on the aftermath of the adaptation from that year. This was rebroadcast in 1988 by the station in commemoration of the 50th anniversary of the original broadcast, then in 1998 and 2001.

1973: Shane "The Cosmic Cowboy" was the opening DJ and the rest of the broadcast was identical to the version two years earlier albeit with Ron Baskin added as newscaster. However, this version was not a stand-alone broadcast as other WKBW-produced radio thrillers bookend the dramatization. Unlike the previous installments, the disclaimers of "This is a dramatization" has been placed before and after commercial breaks. WGWE rebroadcast this edition in 2012.

1975: Considered by many to be the weakest of the versions, this edition contained sloppy editing done to eliminate on-air talent no longer with the station, notably Kaye, who would later become WPVI's Action News announcer until his death in 2012. Jim Quinn served as the disk jockey.

1978: Coinciding with the 40th anniversary of the original Orson Welles' radio drama, KSEI in Pocatello, Idaho adopted the 1971 WKBW version for their own staging of "The War of the Worlds", using their news department personnel.

1998: A totally new remake was produced by 97 Rock to commemorate the 30th anniversary of the first WKBW version. Kaye and Weinstein (in one of his last appearances before his retirement at the end of that year) reprised their respective roles in the original, while personalities such as Don Postles, Larry Norton, Erie County Executive Dennis Gorski and Mayor Anthony Masiello participated. This was rebroadcast in 2001. It was rebroadcast a second time in 2018.

=== Documentaries ===
Coinciding with the 30th anniversary of the 1968 broadcast, The Making of WKBW's The War of the Worlds was broadcast on WNED-TV, hosted by Bob Koshinski. It featured Jim Fagan, Irv Weinstein, Jefferson Kaye and director Danny Kriegler. This was followed up by the documentary WKBW Radio's War of the Worlds, 50 Years later. It debuted on October 30, 2018.

== See also ==
- The War of the Worlds, 1898 novel by H. G. Wells

== Bibliography ==
- Gosling, John. Waging the War of the Worlds. Jefferson, North Carolina, McFarland, 2009 (paperback, ISBN 0-7864-4105-4).
