= Shredd and Ragan =

The Shredd and Ragan Show
- (l-r) Potter, Jacka, Shredd, Ragan, James.
- Genre: Comedy-Talk
- Running time: 6am-10am M-F
- Country of origin: United States
- Language: English
- Home station: WEDG (1994–2021); WGRF (since 2021)
- Original release: March, 1994

Shredd and Ragan is a talk radio show based in Buffalo, New York. The show is hosted by the titular Ted Shredd and Tom Ragan and also features producer Jim Jacka and assistant producer Evan James. The show broadcasts to Buffalo, Toronto and Southern Ontario and is heard weekday mornings from 6am to 10am.

The show has been a mainstay in Buffalo radio since Tom Ragan and Ted Shredd paired in 1994.

Shredd and Ragan have received national recognition from the former radio business magazine Radio and Records, as nominees for Alternative Rock Show of the Year for 2003, 2004 and 2005 and Active Rock Show of the Year in 2006. The show is a consistent winner of Artvoice's Best Radio Show in Buffalo award, as well.

Based at WEDG (103.3 The Edge) from its 1994 launch until August 2021, the duo were reassigned to WGRF (96.9, 97 Rock) in 2021 after a controversy led to the firing of that station's morning show earlier in the year.

== Format ==
The Shredd and Ragan Show is a four-hour comedy talk radio show that covers everything from politics to sports, music, movies, the internet and people making news. The show often deals with what's going on around Western New York including anything relating to the Buffalo Bills and Buffalo Sabres.

== History ==
The show got its start in 1994 when Tom Ragan, then on WGR as The Tom and Karen Show was paired with Ted Shredd, then on WUFX as Ted Shredd and Mr. Ed Show. The show first made a name for itself by covering (and making fun of) the Buffalo State College Prostitute trial, and airing non-stop bits on the O. J. Simpson trial, culminating in the "OJ Bronco Chase Parade" on Buffalo's Kensington Expressway.

In 1995, WUFX changed formats and renamed as WEDG, keeping only Shredd and Ragan from the previous roster. In an often told on-air story, Shredd and Ragan explain how they went across the street to a staff meeting, looked around cluelessly, and then realized they were the only ones from the current airstaff sitting in the room. Shredd and Ragan were also the first to speak with football player Terrell Owens upon his arrival to the Buffalo Bills.

=== Move Back to Mornings ===
On January 4, 2012, it was announced that Shredd and Ragan would be moving back to mornings starting January 9, 2012. When the Opie and Anthony show came to WEDG in 2006, Shredd and Ragan were moved to afternoons 3-7pm, moving Bull Radio to 12-3p, and moving then jock Val Townsend (now at sister station WHTT) to 9-12pm. When Opie and Anthony were let go, Bull moved his show to the morning drive, simply renaming his show "Morning Bull." With S&R moving back to mornings, Bull will be going back to his previous time slot that he had before the 2006 switch to 3-7pm (Bull eventually replaced Larry Norton as morning host at WGRF).

Shredd and Ragan reached an agreement in July 2015 to continue their show at WEDG through 2019.

=== Members Of Show ===
- Ted Shredd - co-host. Worked at KHTZ Lake Tahoe/ Reno, Nevada, in Buffalo produced the Taylor and Moore Show on WPHD and The Bearman Show at WUFX. Also on air at the Heavy Metal Rebel Radio 14X WXBX, and WGIR Manchester, NH. Then Returned to WUFX Buffalo.
- Tom Ragan - co-host. Worked in Wilkes-Barre, Pa. at WARM, Freeland, Pa. at WQEQ and WXPX, Benton, Pa. at WBNE, Wheeling, WV. at WZMM, and State College, Pa. at WQWK and Buffalo afternoons as Tom and Karen on WGR Newsradio 55.
- Jim Jacka - producer. Currently acts as show producer, traffic reporter, and overnight host at sister station WHTT.
- Evan James - assistant producer - Also the station's imaging director and voicetracks the 7pm-midnight shift.

=== Assistant Producer Timeline ===
- 1994 - 1998 - Between these years SHREDD & RAGAN did not have an official Assistant Producer
- 1998 - 2000 - Anne Marie
- 2000 - December 2003 - Evil Jim
- December 2003 - February 2004 - Suzy "Porn Chick"
- February 2004–September 2017- Josh Potter
- October 2017 - Present - Evan James

=== Producer Timeline ===
- 1994 - 1996 - Between these years SHREDD & RAGAN did not have an official producer.
- 1996 - 1997 - Frankie Moh.
- 1997 - 1998 - Darren McKee.
- 1998 - 2000 - Tim Switala.
- 2001 - 2003 - Ryan Patrick.
- December 2003 - 2006 - "Evil" Jim Kurdziel.
- 2007–present - Jim Jacka.

=== Other characters ===
Called "the Barbarians" after a frequently-played clip of the late Sen. Robert Byrd's speech about Michael Vick and his use of the word "barbaric", the Barbarians are frequent contributors to the program and compete annually for the best-call award in the Barbaric Cup:

Bradley Lama

Earned his nickname from call-ins during the Dalai Lama's visit to SUNY Buffalo in September 2006. Bradley is a frequent participant in the show's "Your Turn" segment and (self-proclaimed) show historian.

Jobless John

Unemployed Buffalonian who phones with wisecracks while sitting on his couch. Begins each call with, "Hey guys, thanks for keeping me entertained while I'm out of work".

John from Love Canal

From the most notorious neighborhood in Niagara Falls, his claim that he does not glow is greeted with skepticism.

Lismo

Ardent fan of the show; says he enjoys Jägermeister so much that he had the image of the bottle tattooed on his leg (earning him a lifetime supply from the company).

Lortab Zombie

(Prematurely-) retired roofing contractor and user of Lortab, who insists he is not an addict. Runner-up in the second annual Barbaric Cup (2009) to Brotha Pope. Winner in 2010, which entitles him to be known as King Lortab Zombie.

Marty from the Island

Forced to have his beer parties in the garage, because his wife will not allow his buddies in the house (to sully their immaculately-clean bathroom).

Rehab Jerry

Good-hearted soul who calls from rehab or a halfway house. Known to fall off the wagon; once, he went to a wedding and disappeared for a month. Ends his calls with, "Barbaric!"

Sean in Hamburg

Knows more about wrestling than Vince McMahon, Sr. (founder of WWE).

"Sad Sean" Pulvirenti (Angola, New York)

Frequent caller on the Shredd And Ragan show who shared personal experiences and commentary with the show's audience for many years.

== Past and present bits ==
- Missed Connections - Forget to catch the name of a recent encounter, S&R reads craiglist postings of people looking for someone, wanted or not, to connect back with.
- Shredd and Ragan Theater - recreations of current and past moments in history.
- Niagara Falls Police Blotter - unknown to tourists, the American side of the Falls is crawling with insane and unique crime. S&R read the best each week, especially good when one of the perpetrators calls to defend or explain "what really happened".
- OTF - Stands for Ohio, Texas, Florida, callers are presented with unique news reports from one of the three states then have to guess where the story originated.
- Balls of Steel Week and Embarrassing Childhood Memories Week - examples of themed weeks, in this case the show interviews people who live through amazing life experiences, war, bear attacks, etc., or they tell embarrassing stories of their childhood and listeners add theirs.
- New Music Tuesday - Hosts and callers rip on new music. Some music is good, some horrendous like Sigor Ros.
- Nate Gerbe Hemet Cam - A skit taken from the helmet-cam perspective of former Buffalo Sabres forward Nathan Gerbe, who, at 5'4", was notorious for his short physique. See the video here.
- Know Your Bills - Various Buffalo Bills are asked bizarre questions and callers have to guess how they answered.
- Touchdown Throwndown - Listeners compete for Buffalo Bills season tickets. They've walked blindfolded into batting cages, taken slap shots in net from Buffalo Sabres and had various body parts pierced.
- Sammy Van Halen - An interesting fellow who lives with his mom, was born in Love Canal, wears sports jerseys with the name "Sammy Van Halen" over the original players name, drives sick sports cars - the most recent being the new Z06 Corvette, and going into various business establishments and raising a ruckus, along with picking up hot women and quoting assorted lines from different Van Halen songs into complete sentences. Lastly, Sammy Van Halen is "unreachable by telephone".
- Moo at the Canadians - simple and straightforward. They'd call a Canadian and moo at them. Listeners would call and guess if the Canadian would moo back. No one ever mooed back. Then they'd call someone in the US and they'd immediately moo back proving Canadians were not as stupid as Americans who thought cows were calling them.
