= WUFX =

WUFX may refer to:

- WNXG-LD, a television station (channel 33, virtual 38) licensed to Tallahassee, Florida, United States, which held the call sign WUFX-LD from 2014 to 2020
- WEDG, a radio station (103.3 FM) licensed to Buffalo, New York, United States, which used the call sign WUFX from 1989 to 1995
- WLOO, a television station (channel 35 analog/41 digital) licensed to Vicksburg, Mississippi, United States, which used the call sign WUFX from 2003 to 2013
