= WUSW =

- Niagara Falls, New York; United States
- Broadcast area: Buffalo-Niagara Falls metropolitan area
- Frequency: 1270 kHz
- Branding: US Country

Programming
- Format: Country

Ownership
- Owner: Buddy Shula; (Radio One Buffalo, LLC)
- Sister stations: WECK

History
- First air date: May 20, 1940
- Former call signs: WHLD (1940–2025)
- Call sign meaning: Contains "United States".

Technical information
- Licensing authority: FCC
- Facility ID: 7822
- Class: B
- Power: 5,000 watts (day); 1,000 watts (night)
- Transmitter coordinates: 42°44′41″N 78°53′13″W
- Translators: 93.3 W227BW (Amherst); 95.1 W236EB (Buffalo)

Links
- Public license information: Public file; LMS
- Webcast: Listen live
- Website: uscountry.com

WUSW (1270 AM) is a commercial radio station licensed to Niagara Falls, New York, and serving the Buffalo-Niagara Falls metropolitan area. It is owned by Radio One Buffalo, LLC, a company controlled by Buddy Shula, and is currently airing a traditional/adult country format.

By day, WUSW transmits with 5,000 watts, and to protect other stations from interference, at night it reduces power to 1,000 watts. The station's transmitter is off Cloverbank Road at Sawgrass Court in Hamburg. It uses a directional antenna with a five-tower array. WUSW's studios are shared with WECK on Genesee Street in Cheektowaga.

== History ==
=== Earl Clement Hull ===
On May 20, 1940, the station signed on as WHLD, the call sign it would hold for its first 85 years. It was owned by Earl Clement Hull of Niagara Falls, New York. The call sign represented the name of his second wife, Hilda Lewis Carpenter Hull, of Ontario, Canada.

Earl Hull was a radio pioneer who entered St. Lawrence University in 1916. He gained a knowledge of radio technology, which he later applied to communication problems in World War I. His talents helped the university establish broadcasting station WCAD in 1922. He later built WKY in Oklahoma City. In 1940, he returned to Niagara Falls to establish WHLD. The radio station often programmed classical music and featured local artists. Among them was a continuing program of classical piano duets played by Niagara Falls pianist Harold Bradley and his friend John Peirce Langs of Buffalo. In 1946, an FM station was added, 98.5 WHLD-FM (now WKSE). In its early decades, WHLD-FM mostly simulcast WHLD 1270, but later switched to beautiful music.

=== Changes in ownership ===
Locally owned Butler Communications Corporation bought WHLD and its sister station (by then flipped to progressive/underground as The Wizard, WZIR) in May 1980. During the Butler Communications days, WHLD played adult standards and big band music on weekdays, with some ethnic programming on weekends. The station was billed as "The Station of the Nations", and owner Paul Butler's daughter Mary Ann Butler gave the station its tag line, "The Sound of the Falls." Veteran Buffalo Radio Personality John LaMond began his career at WHLD in 1981.

In August 1999, WHLD was purchased by Citadel Broadcasting Corporation. At midnight on Monday, February 13, 2006, WHLD gave up its brokered programming format and Niagara Independent Media began operating the station via a Local marketing agreement (LMA). It was branded "News Talk 1270: The Voice of Reason." It began carrying the progressive talk shows of Air America Radio. That programming was dropped in December 2006 due to financial problems. Some of the non-profit programs, including Democracy Now, were moved to sister station WBBF.

=== Urban gospel and adult standards ===
The station then began an urban gospel format through a lease with the Totally Gospel Radio Network. That programming had been carried on daytime only station WBBF since May 1997. On August 2, 2010, Totally Gospel ended its 3½ year lease of WHLD in preparation of the construction of its own station, WFWO at 89.7 kHz.

WHLD, back under the control of Citadel Broadcasting Corporation, then switched to an automated adult standards format, becoming the first adult standards station in the market since WECK dropped the format in 2006. On August 11, 2010, WHLD began branding itself "Swing 1270" featuring vocalists associated with the Great American Songbook. Harv Moore, a well-known local radio personality, was added as the first disc jockey in April 2011. Its only competitor for the adult standards market in Western New York was distant but powerful 50,000 watt CFZM, located in Toronto.

=== Sports radio ===
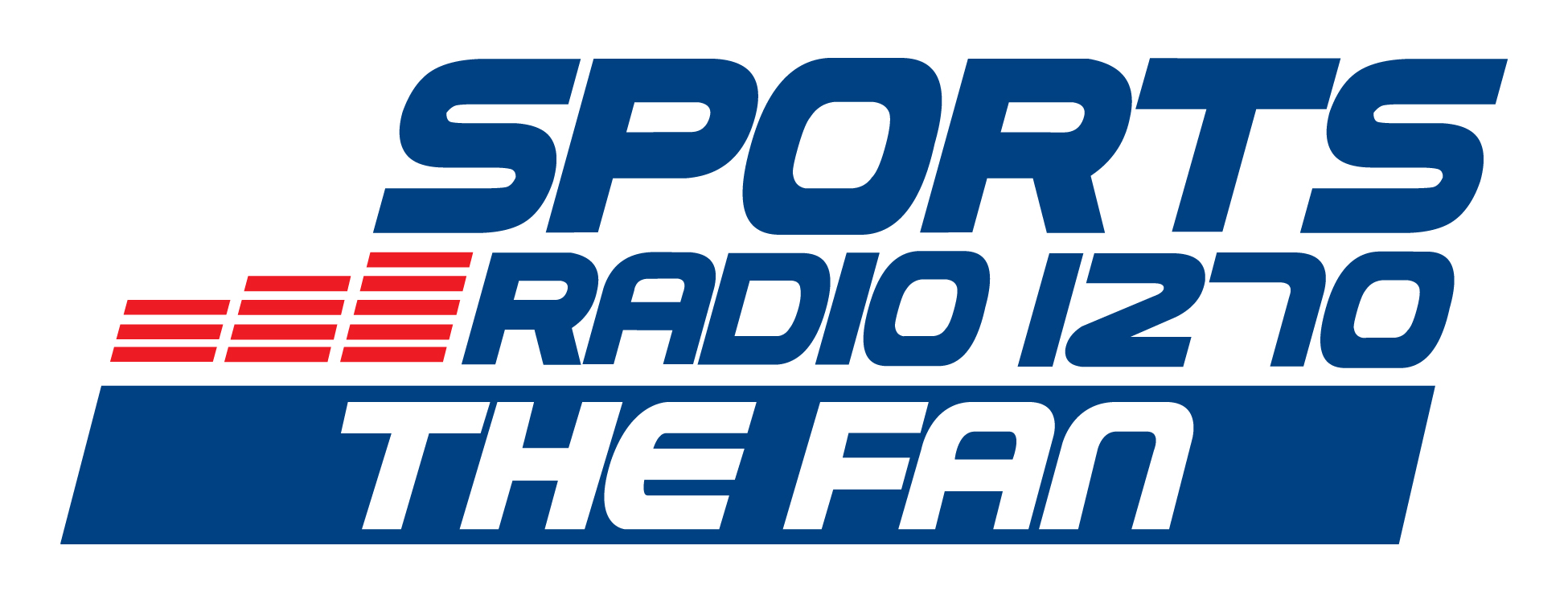
Former logo as "Sports Radio 1270, The Fan"

Cumulus Media bought WHLD and other Citadel stations in a deal approved in September 2011. In January 2013, Cumulus announced that WHLD would be changing its format, this time to sports talk. Most programming would come from CBS Sports Radio. One local program, hosted by Rich Gaenzler, aired from noon to 3 p.m. (CBS Sports Radio's offering in that time slot, The Jim Rome Show, was already carried in Western New York by 1520 WWKB). Cumulus Media planned to move the former WHLD Spanish-language Christian radio format to 1120 WBBF, but protests from the Spanish speaking community led the company to reconsider. In May 2013, the adult standards format was picked up by 1230 WECK.

WHLD acquired the rights to Buffalo Bulls sports teams in 2013 from the University of Buffalo. Those rights had previously been with 1230 WECK. WHLD lost the rights to UB athletics in 2014 when they moved to 1520 WWKB. WHLD acquired local rights to the NFL on Westwood One along with Westwood One's NCAA football package in 2015. Gaenzler left the station in late 2015, moving to 96.9 WGRF. The Herd with Colin Cowherd was inserted into his previous local time slot, leaving the station entirely syndicated. WHLD temporarily added a show from Bob Koshinski (formerly of WNSA, WBBZ-TV and the Empire Sports Network) and The Buffalo News columnists Bucky Gleason and Jerry Sullivan in January 2016. The station brought back The Bucky and Sully Show in September 2016, and also add a weekly show with News columnist Tim Graham.

On September 1, 2016, WHLD made a deal to carry radio the broadcasts of Syracuse Orange basketball and football in the Buffalo market, as well as Notre Dame Fighting Irish football's national broadcasts in weeks where the Irish and Orange games are played at different times.

=== Talk radio ===
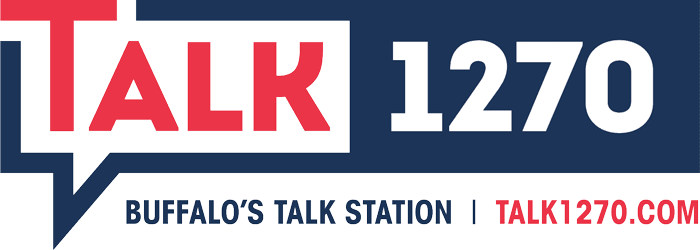
Former logo as "Talk 1270"

On May 24, 2021, Cumulus changed WHLD's format to conservative talk, branded as "Talk 1270." The move was part of Cumulus's rollout of Dan Bongino's national show.

As a conservative talk station, WHLD competed primarily with 930 WBEN, a Buffalo news/talk station, owned by Audacy. With WHLD carrying the Westwood One talk line-up, The Mark Levin Show, previously heard on WBEN, shifted to WHLD.

WHLD was briefly slated for shutdown in March 2025 as part of Cumulus's plans to reduce its portfolio of underperforming AM radio stations. It was spared from closure and remained operational (though its Web site and online feed were shut down) while a sale was sought.

=== Sale to Buddy Shula ===
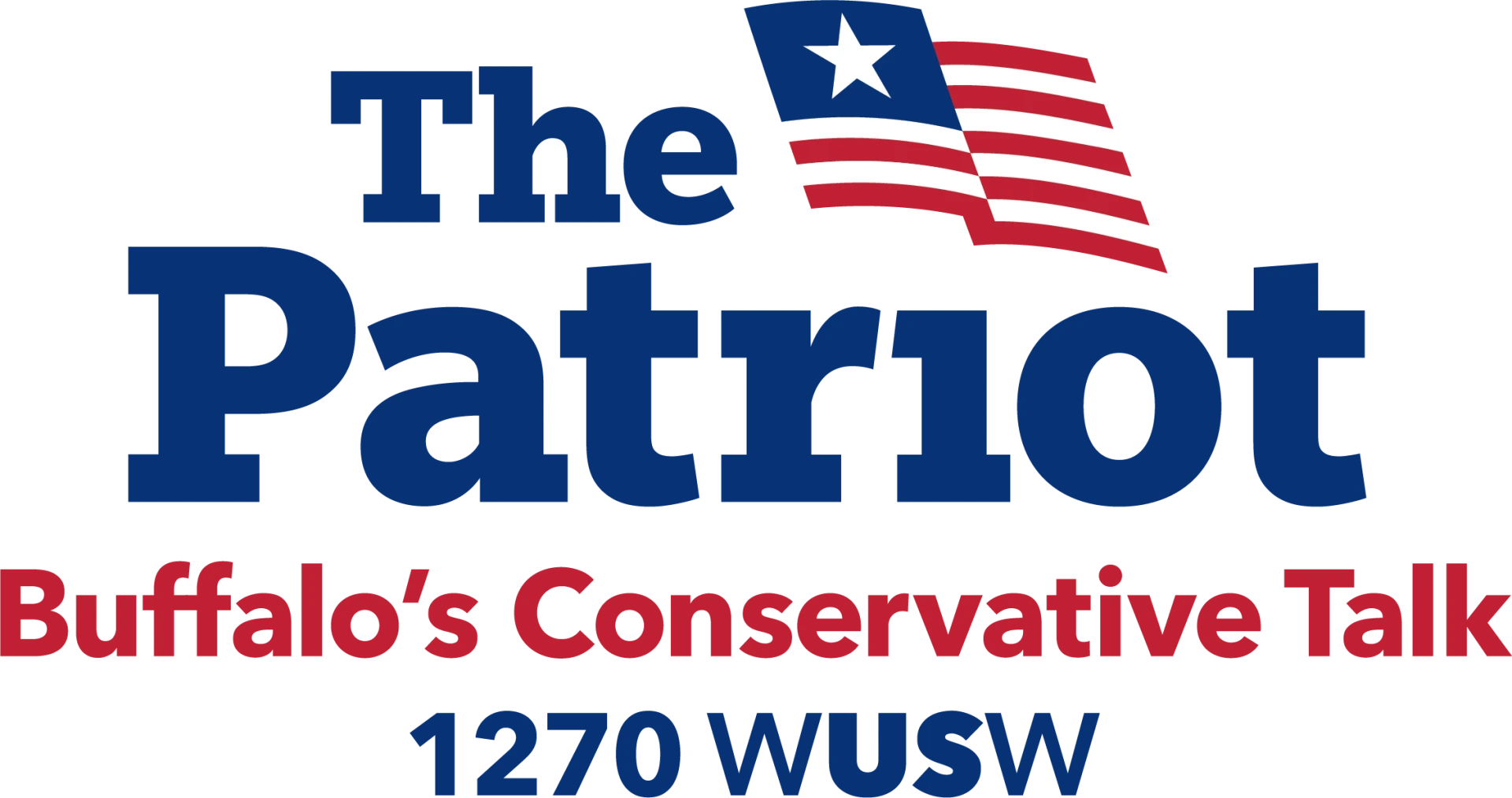
Former logo as "The Patriot"

In May 2025, Cumulus struck an agreement with Buddy Shula, owner of WECK, for Shula to purchase WHLD. Shula began programming the station June 1, initially simulcasting WECK. Shula adopted the new call sign WUSW for the station, a call sign he chose for its "patriotic" overtones. On June 18, 2025, after a transitional period in which the station simulcast WECK, WUSW announced that it would relaunch as The Patriot on July 4, maintaining its conservative talk format with a new lineup drawn primarily from Premiere Networks (Michael DelGiorno, Glenn Beck, Clay Travis and Buck Sexton, Sean Hannity and Jesse Kelly), along with affiliations with Salem Media, Bloomberg, and CNBC for news content. Some Cumulus/Westwood One programs, including Vince Coglianese (Dan Bongino's replacement), Erick Erickson, and Red Eye Radio carried over to the WUSW lineup in evenings and overnights. State assemblyman David DiPietro also hosted a program on the station.

Shula stated that he was inspired to keep the conservative talk format after Audacy came under the partial ownership of Soros Fund Management, a company whose namesake George Soros has been a long-distrusted figure among American conservatives, potentially compromising WBEN's audience credibility. He also stated that he had attempted to pursue a Fox News Radio affiliation for the station, but that he was unable to do so. (WBEN outmaneuvered WUSW to secure the Fox affiliation that July.)

Shula acquired two FM translators on 93.3 and 95.1 from Calvary Chapel of the Finger Lakes to simulcast WUSW on the FM band.

=== Country music ===
In late September 2026, the conservative talk format abruptly ended. This was initially blamed on technical difficulties but was later revealed as being due to exceptionally low advertising income. On October 5, the station's Web site was taken down and the station began simulcasting WECK as a temporary measure.

On October 26, 2026, following a two-day Halloween music stunt, WUSW launched a retro country format, branded as "US Country". The station is positioned between the two heritage country stations in the market, featuring music newer than typically played on the pure classic country station WXRL and older than the contemporary country hits of WYRK; Liz Mantel, who had been morning host on WLKK during its brief run with a similar format, was hired in the same position.
