= Joey Reynolds =

American radio show host

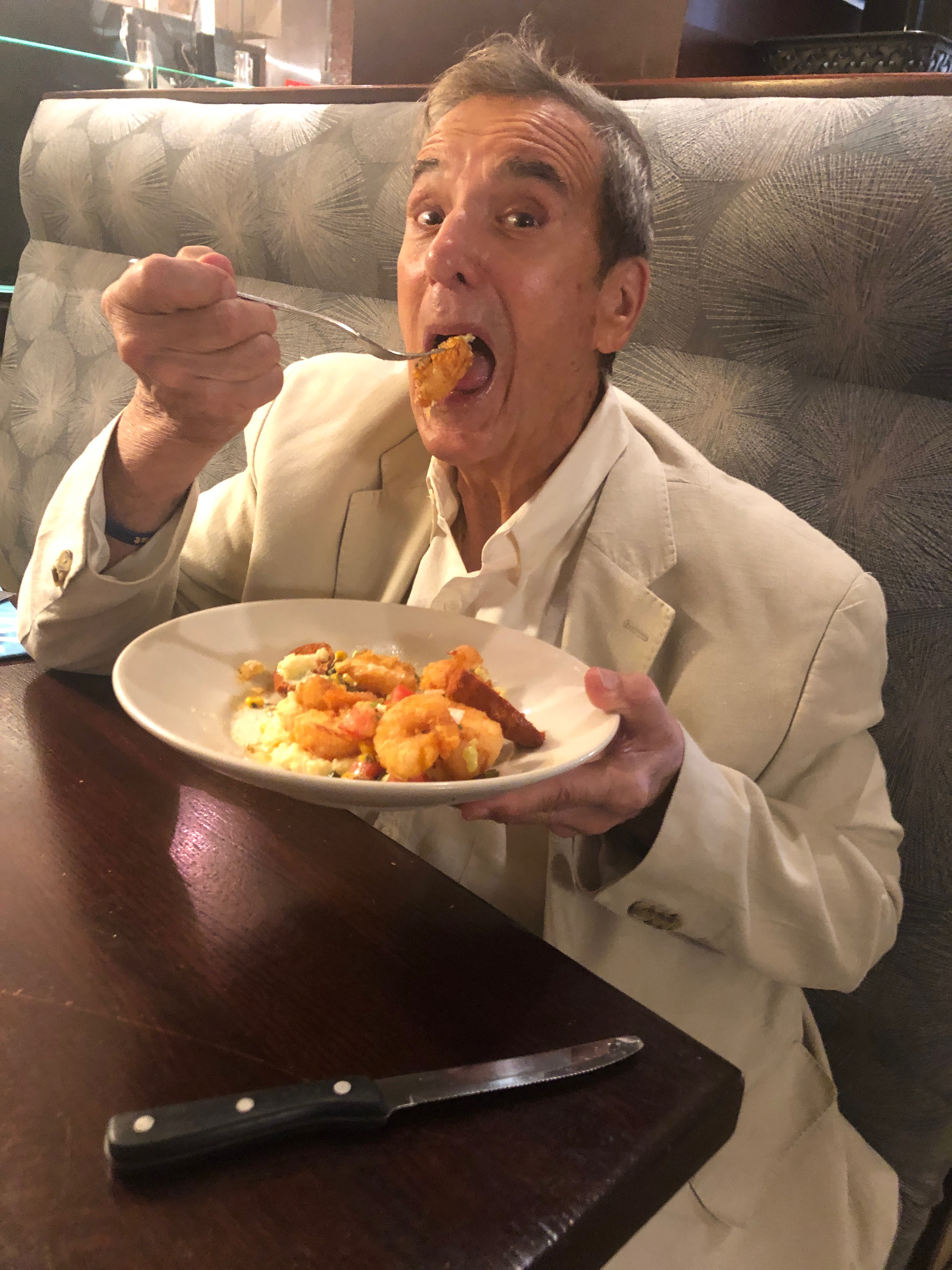
Reynolds in 2019

Joseph Pinto, better known as Joey Reynolds, is a long-time radio show host and disc jockey. Reynolds' broadcasting career started on TV in Buffalo at WGR TV 2 and he worked at various stations, including at WNBC.

== Career ==
Reynolds began his radio experience as a youth, when he, his longtime friend and collaborator Danny Neaverth, future WEBR jockey Danny McBride, and others set up a closed-circuit radio station at a Boys Club in Buffalo, under a sponsorship deal with a local pizzeria that "paid" the jockeys in free pizza.

His first professional radio job was WWOL (now WBBF) in Buffalo with Dick Purtan, then WKWK, in Wheeling, WV. After that, he continued at several venerable stations, including WKBW in Buffalo, New York, WNBC and WOR in New York City, KQV in Pittsburgh, KMPC and KRTH in Los Angeles, WPOP and WDRC in Hartford, WIXY in Cleveland, and WIBG and WFIL in Philadelphia.

He rose to fame as a Top 40 radio personality during the 1960s and 1970s, amassing large audiences in places such as Hartford, Connecticut, Cleveland, Ohio, Detroit, Michigan, and his hometown of Buffalo, New York. Reynolds is often regarded as an early progenitor of "shock talk radio", whose sometimes outlandish on and off-air stunts garnered widespread publicity. One night, Reynolds started playing an endless loop of a The Four Seasons song, and locked the studio door from the inside. It played for over an hour, during which the station management arrived, police and paramedics showed up (in case Joey was incapacitated). The stunt earned nationwide acclaim, and the group thanked Joey by producing a special radio jingle to introduce of his daily radio show, set to the tune of their hit "Big Girls Don’t Cry"). The stunt was incorporated into Jersey Boys but with Reynolds's name removed and replaced with a fictional character named Barry Belson, a fact Reynolds "bitterly resents." A Reynolds WPOP theme song put lyrics to the sax-laden hit "Wild Weekend", by Buffalo, NY group The Rockin' Rebels (the song had been written as a theme for another Buffalo radio personality, Tom Shannon). He also started an on air club for his listeners called The Royal Order Of The Night People. He had a nightly ritual wearing a purple robe lighting a purple candle on his purple radio while talking over his Night People" instrumental theme which was "Tarantula" by The Tarantulas.

Reynolds was initially forced out of Buffalo in 1966 after a disastrous, uncooperative interview with Frank Gorshin ended with Reynolds accusing Gorshin of collecting an overly high appearance fee for a charity appearance. Reynolds responded by nailing a pair of shoes to the WKBW station manager's door daring the manager to fill those shoes. In another incident while at WDRC in Hartford he once referred to the then Hartford Mayor Ann Uccello as "a stupid broad" while live on the air. Station Management promptly suspended him which created an outcry of public support from his listeners. After he was reinstated, his first words on the air were "I still think she's a stupid broad".

Reynolds excelled at comedic voice characterizations, his means of social commentary without it being directly attributable to "Joey Reynolds". Some of his regular voices included "Jack Armstrong" - All American boy; "Maude Frickette" - the 104 year old teenager; and "General Shelby Singleton Silvers Junior Esquire Y'all" - an older southern gentleman.

Reynolds was the focus of a two-part series on The Oprah Winfrey Show concerning talk radio personalities, on which more than a dozen of Reynolds' media peers paid tribute to him. Moreover, he has been invited to speak about entertainment media at several radio industry conferences. During his time in Buffalo, he and fellow DJ Danny Neaverth recorded a novelty single entitled "Rats in My Room" (an expanded and rearranged cover of a Leona Anderson song of the same name).

Reynolds and Neaverth, on behalf of WKBW, were offered the chance to bring The Beatles to Buffalo Memorial Auditorium on February 10, 1964, the day after the band had appeared on The Ed Sullivan Show. It would have been the Beatles' first concert in North America. Unwilling to risk the $3500 appearance fee for a Monday night concert, in the poor February weather, for an unproven band he did not expect to sell out the auditorium, the two declined the offer. It was not until after Beatlemania swept the nation that they acknowledged that it was a mistake to not bring them in. In the three years the band toured North America, they never performed a show in Buffalo. On-air, Reynolds played the part of a heel, openly denouncing the Beatles and refusing to play their records or mention their names.

Joey Reynolds was in the category of disc jockey, playing music on music intensive radio stations from the very late 1950s until the mid-1980s during his time on Z100 and WFIL. In 1986, he arrived at then-WNBC in New York City doing the afternoon drive, Howard Stern's previous shift. That station was attempting to move into a more talk intensive full service format with music taking a backseat but was still heard. Reynolds was basically playing a mix of oldies and adult contemporary cuts along with comedy and personality, and was most notably on the air when the station's traffic helicopter crashed on October 22, killing reporter Jane Dornacker. He exited WNBC at the end of February 1987 and was replaced by Alan Colmes.

His next programs were morning shows and at that point Joey had evolved into more of a talk intensive program. He was less a DJ and more like a talk show host. Reynolds, who acknowledged much of his erratic behavior in his early career was driven by rampant drug and alcohol abuse, was by this time sober and had reaffirmed his faith, resulting in a calmer, more subdued personality. By 1995, Joey was no longer playing music on his shows and in 1996 he arrived at WOR in New York. He has been a talk show host since.

While Reynolds' present persona can be considered mellower by comparison, he still retains a loyal audience. During 1982 he hosted an overnight radio-television simulcast on KOA-AM and KOA-TV in Denver. He also launched (and hosted) the first nationwide satellite radio programming featured on more than 35 radio stations coast-to-coast.

Reynolds' career memoir is titled, Let a Smile Be Your Umbrella, But Don’t Get a Mouthful of Rain. He maintains a second home in Florida and spends most weekends with two daughters from a previous marriage.

On March 10, 2010, it was revealed that WOR would pick up Coast to Coast AM from Premiere Radio and would cancel "The Joey Reynolds Show." (Coast to Coast had been heard on crosstown rival WABC for several years, before that station dropped the show in favor of an in-house offering from Doug McIntyre, which led Premiere to seek WOR as the new New York affiliate; Premiere's parent company would buy WOR two years later.) Reynolds' last show, which was segregated into the "Final Gay Hour," the "Final Jewish Hour" and "The Final Hour," aired the morning of April 3, 2010.

Reynolds later hosted All Night with Joey Reynolds on WNBC-DT2, the digital subchannel of television station WNBC-TV known as "New York Nonstop." It was broadcast live from the NASDAQ site in Times Square at 43rd Street and Broadway. Reynolds was reunited with his former WNBC radio sidekick, Jay Sorensen, as the program's announcer. The series ended on April 25, 2011. Steve Garrin was the producer and guest booker.

Reynolds made a cameo appearance on the ill-fated Buffalo Night in America broadcast on WBBZ-TV in July 2012.

On September 18, 2016, Joey returned to radio on WABC-AM in New York with a Sunday evening program, The Late Joey Reynolds Show, which ended in the summer of 2017.

=== Stations at which Reynolds has worked ===
- WNCO, Ashland, Ohio
- WWOL, Buffalo, New York
- WKWK, Wheeling, West Virginia
- WAME, Miami, Florida
- KQAQ, Austin, Minnesota (1960–61)
- WNDR, Syracuse, New York (1961–62)
- WPOP, Hartford, Connecticut (1962–63)
- WKBW, Buffalo, New York (1963–66)
- WDOK/WIXY, Cleveland, Ohio (1966)
- WXYZ, Detroit, Michigan (1966)
- WDRC, Hartford, Connecticut (1968–1971)
- WIBG, Philadelphia, Pennsylvania
- WHLW, Howell, New Jersey (1973–75)
- KQV, Pittsburgh, Pennsylvania (1975–76)
- KMPC, Los Angeles, California (1976–80)
- KRTH, Los Angeles, California (1980–81)
- WGAR, Cleveland, Ohio (1981)
- KOA, KOA-TV, Denver, Colorado (1982)
- WHTZ, New York City, New York (1983)
- WHYT, Detroit, Michigan (1983–84)
- KMGG, Los Angeles, California (1984)
- WFIL, Philadelphia, Pennsylvania (1984–1986)
- WNBC, New York City, New York (1986–87)
- WSHE, Miami, Florida (1988)
- WQAM, WIOD and WPLG-TV, Miami, Florida (1988–90)
- WFLY, Albany, New York (1990–94)
- WBZT, West Palm Beach, Florida (1994–96)
- WOR, New York City, New York and national syndication (1996–2010)
- WNBC-DT2, New York City, New York (2011)
- WABC-AM, New York City, New York and national syndication (2016–2017)

== Personal life ==
On February 28, 2024, Reynolds sustained major head injuries when he fell out of bed and struck his head in his Manhattan apartment; he was found unconscious by his landlord the next day and hospitalized.

Reynolds has two daughters, Kristen Marti and Mercedes Pinto.
