= Ken Reeth =

Ken Reeth (1938 – May 9, 2005) was a colorful and creative disc jockey well known to many hippies and rock music fans as Brother Love.

Brother Love's Underground was radio show in the late-60's that was dedicated to psychedelic and underground rock music. It originated from Pittsburgh radio station WAMO-FM, with Reeth being its psychedelic DJ and emcee. It was also aired, via tape, on Dynamic Broadcasting which owned WILD-AM in Boston, WUFO-AM in Buffalo and WOAH in Miami.

While working at WAMO, which had a soul and R&B format, Reeth got the idea to do a show promoting the growing psychedelic rock music scene, mostly based in San Francisco and LA. Like Tom Donahue, his west-coast counterpart, he was one of the first to introduce listeners to Iron Butterfly, Country Joe and the Fish, Mothers of Invention, the early Doors, Jimi Hendrix, West Coast Pop Art Experimental Band, Vanilla Fudge and others. Although many of the artists on the show have been mainstays of classic rock stations for decades now, this was very adventurous radio programming at the time.

Reeth was born in The Bronx, and moved to Allentown, Pennsylvania when he was a teenager. He was part of nightclub comedy team called Reeth & King and later a morning radio duo on WDRC in Hartford, Connecticut. He went on to WAMO in Pittsburgh and later to vice president of programming for Dynamic Broadcasting. He left Pittsburgh in 1973 for the west coast and bought KKAR, a country station in Pomona, where his on-air name was Romeo Jones.

In his later years, Reeth posted some of his memories on Radio Nostalgia, a website devoted to Pittsburgh radio history.

Reeth died from leukemia.
