= WUFO =

Coordinates: 42°55′27″N 78°46′41″W

- Amherst, New York; United States
- Broadcast area: Buffalo metropolitan area
- Frequency: 1080 kHz
- Branding: Power 96.5

Programming
- Format: Urban AC and Classic Hip Hop

Ownership
- Owner: Sheila L. Brown; (Visions Multi Media Group – WUFO Radio LLC)

History
- First air date: 1948; 78 years ago
- Call sign meaning: WUFO (close rhyming scheme to "We're Buffalo!")

Technical information
- Licensing authority: FCC
- Facility ID: 60154
- Class: D
- Power: 1,000 watts (days only)
- Translator: 96.5 W243DX (Buffalo)

Links
- Public license information: Public file; LMS
- Webcast: Listen Live
- Website: wuforadio.com

WUFO (1080 kHz) is a commercial AM radio station licensed to Amherst, New York, and serving the Buffalo metropolitan area. It is owned by the Visions Multi Media Group headed by Sheila. L. Brown and it broadcasts a hybrid Urban AC and Classic Hip Hop radio format. Its studios are on Broadway Avenue in Buffalo.

WUFO transmits 1,000 watts non-directional. WUFO is a daytimer station because 1080 AM is a clear-channel frequency reserved for Class A stations WTIC Hartford and KRLD Dallas, so WUFO must sign off at sunset to avoid interference. The transmitter is on Genesee Street in Cheektowaga. Programming is heard around the clock on 35-watt FM translator W243DX at 96.5 MHz. It uses the FM translator frequency in its moniker, "Power 96.5."

== History ==
=== WPDQ, WKEN and WMAK ===
The roots of today's WUFO can actually be traced back to 1925, with the founding of WPDQ in Kenmore, New York, a Buffalo suburb. WPDQ was owned by Hiram Turner and Nelson P. Baker (not related to venerable priest Nelson H. Baker) and operated for one day, December 30, 1925, before the Federal Radio Commission suspended its license. By the time the station returned to the air in 1927, it had taken the call sign WKEN. General Order 40 proposed that WKEN share airtime with WKBW, which was moving to the frequency WKEN was using at the time: 1470 kilocycles. WKEN objected and proposed to move down the dial to 1040 and operate as a daytime-only station, then a novel concept. In 1930, WKEN became WMAK, taking on the intellectual property of a station that was displaced when The Buffalo News purchased its frequency. (The other station became WBEN.)

The second incarnation of WMAK ceased operations in 1932, amid the Great Depression and antitrust pressures on the Buffalo Broadcasting Company that owned WGR, WMAK and WKEN at the time. The FRC ordered the station off the air, ostensibly due to "an unsatisfactory showing of public interest."

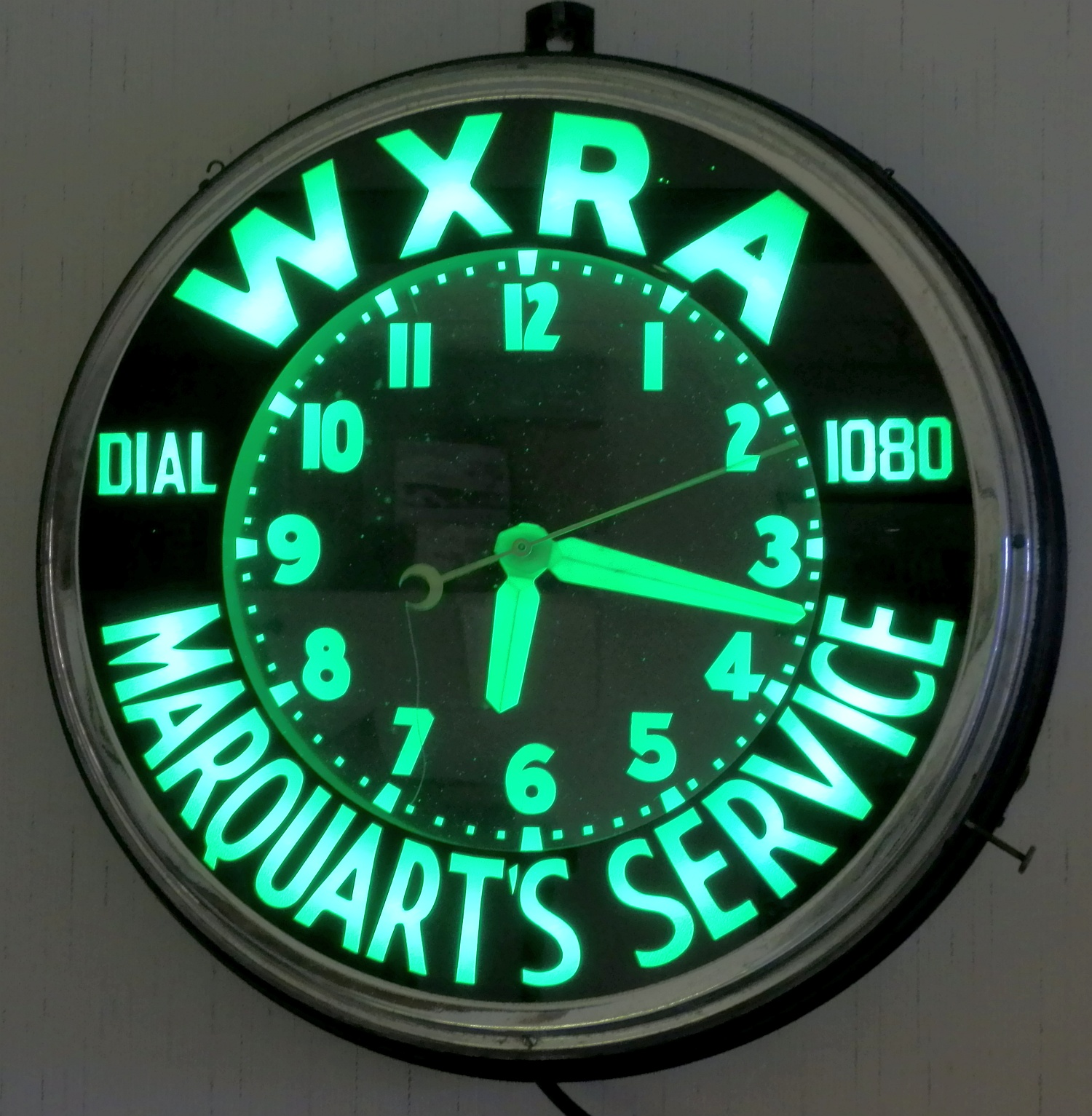
A WXRA Promotional Clock ca. 1948-1957

=== WXRA and WINE ===
The Kenmore allocation remained silent for the next 14 years. In the interim, the North American Regional Broadcasting Agreement (NARBA), implemented in 1941, pushed all stations broadcasting on 1040 up the dial to 1080. In 1946, Thaddeus Podbielniak and Edwin R. Sanders (d/b/a Western New York Broadcasting Company) applied to the FCC to construct a 1,000-watt AM radio station on the 1080 allocation in Kenmore. A construction permit was granted in April 1947. The original call sign for the construction permit was WNYB, but when the station signed on in January 1948, it had the new calls WXRA. The city of license was changed from Kenmore to Buffalo in 1952, although its studios and facilities remained in Kenmore. For the first decade or so of its existence, WXRA was a little-noticed full-service radio station offering a wide variety of music and local news.

George "Hound Dog" Lorenz, who later became a Buffalo radio legend on WKBW and started up WBLK 93.7 FM in 1964, had a show on WXRA during its early years, but was eventually fired for playing too much "race music" (the term used for Rhythm and Blues music in those days). After WKBW adopted a Top 40 format in the late 1950s and took away Lorenz' privilege of playing what he wanted, he returned to 1080 AM and attempted to purchase the station, but was outbid by noted radio station owner Gordon McLendon.

In 1957, Podbielniak and Sanders sold WXRA to John Kluge, who went on to found Metromedia, which eventually owned radio and TV stations in New York City, Washington, D.C. and other cities. Kluge changed the station's call letters to WINE and debuted a Top 40 format on 1080 on October 15, 1957. WINE's mascot was a caricature of an inebriated Frenchman, and the station's slogan was "It goes to your head!" WINE's city of license was changed from Buffalo to Amherst in 1959, although by then the station's studio and transmitter were located on LaSalle Avenue, in Buffalo.

=== Black Programming ===
Acclaimed broadcaster Gordon McLendon purchased WINE in 1960. In April, McLendon changed the call sign to WYSL (for "Whistle") and dropped the Top 40 format in favor of Beautiful Music. Toward the end of 1961, however, McLendon moved the WYSL call letters and easy listening format to the 1400 spot on the AM dial (formerly WBNY). He sold the 1080 frequency to Dynamic Broadcasting, which instituted the WUFO call sign and recrafted the station as the first radio broadcaster programmed for Buffalo's African American community.

Donald C. Mullins, Sr. started out doing the news and eventually worked his way up to become WUFO's General Manager from 1968 until 1981. He received numerous accolades while holding the position at WUFO. Gary Byrd, who went onto a radio career in New York City, began his radio career at WUFO in the 1960s.

Today's 103.3 WEDG was originally the FM side of WXRA (as WXRC) and then of WINE (as WILY and then WINE-FM) in the 1950s. However, Gordon McLendon retained control of the FM station after selling off 1080 to Dynamic and moving the intellectual property of WYSL and its beautiful music format to 1400.

=== WUFO ===
Western New York's first radio station programming to the African-American community began in 1961 when famed station owner Gordon McLendon moved WYSL from 1080 to 1400 AM. McLendon sold the 1080 frequency to Leonard Walk, who owned a group of Black formatted stations (such as WAMO Pittsburgh and WILD Boston). When Walk bought the 1080 frequency in 1961, the original desired callsign was "WJOE" for "W-JOE in Buffalo." Since the callsign was unavailable, the owner instead chose the WUFO call sign and named the station "WU-FO in Buffalo". These call letters provided the rhyming and identification with Buffalo that the owners desired. WUFO's new format began on November 2, 1962 with famed Cleveland Disc Jockey Eddie O'Jay as the first on the air.

Many of the nation's top African American radio personalities spent time at WUFO. Some include Frankie Crocker, Gary Byrd, Herb Hamlett, Jerry Bledsoe, Thelka McCall and her son Dwayne Dancer Donovan, Don Allen, Jerry Young (Youngblood), Don Mullins, Sunny Jim Kelsey, Mansfield Manns Jr, III., Al Brisbane, Jimmy Lyons, H.F. Stone, Chucky T, Al Parker, Gary Lanier, Kelly Carson, Darcel Howell, Mouzon, David Wilson, Byron Pitts, Mark Vann, "The Discotizer" Keith Pollard and Jheri-Lynn. Jimmie Raye hosted the morning show from 1969 to 1971. Raye moved to LA to record music and later produced a TV Special known as "The Soul Thing", in 1976.

In 1972, the Sheridan Broadcasting Corporation purchased Dynamic Broadcasting, making WUFO the only African American owned station in Western New York.

=== Gospel Music ===
Over the years, WUFO played urban gospel music on Sundays. But in the early 2000s it became WUFO's full time format. Until it left the Gospel format in 2017, WUFO often was the only Urban Gospel station in Western New York. A competing gospel station was operated by the Totally Gospel Radio Network on WBBF from 1997 to 2006 and on WHLD from 2006 to 2010.

WUFO was granted an FCC construction permit to move to a new transmitter site and tower, shared with WECK 1230 AM. The permit allowed WUFO to increase power to 2,000 watts, but the power increase was never implemented.

=== Power 96.5 ===
In 2013, WUFO 1080 was purchased by Vision Multi Media Group co-owned by Sheila L. Brown and Buffalo City Council Member Darius Pridgen. That made Brown the first African American female owner of a radio station in Western New York.

On July 24, 2017, WUFO announced it would change its format to Urban AC and Classic Hip Hop. The format change coincided with the addition of an FM translator on W289AU (now W243DX). With the FM signal on 96.5 MHz, the station rebranded as "Power 96.5", beginning August 2, 2017.

== FM Translator ==
WUFO simulcasts on FM translator W243DX, with its transmitter located atop One Seneca Tower in the southern area of Downtown Buffalo.

Broadcast translator for WUFO
Call sign	Frequency	City of license	FID	ERP (W)	Class	FCC info
W243DX	96.5 FM	Buffalo, New York	147327	35	D	LMS

== Bibliography ==
1. A Busload of Buffalo Broadcast History by Shannon Huniwell ("Shannon's Broadcast Classics"), Popular Communications, October 2006 (pp. 72–76. Donna Mullins-Prince (Daughter of Donald C. Mullins, Sr.)
