= WEDG =

- Buffalo, New York; United States
- Broadcast area: Western New York
- Frequency: 103.3 MHz
- Branding: 103.3 The Edge

Programming
- Format: Alternative rock

Ownership
- Owner: Cumulus Media; (Radio License Holding CBC, LLC)
- Sister stations: WBBF, WGRF, WHTT-FM

History
- First air date: 1947
- Former call signs: WYSL-FM (1947–1970); WPHD-FM (1970–1989); WUFX (1989–1995)
- Call sign meaning: "Edge"

Technical information
- Licensing authority: FCC
- Facility ID: 56103
- Class: B
- ERP: 49,000 watts
- HAAT: 106 meters (348 ft)

Links
- Public license information: Public file; LMS
- Webcast: Listen live
- Website: wedg.com

WEDG (103.3 FM) is a commercial radio station licensed to Buffalo, New York, United States, serving Western New York. It is owned by Cumulus Media and calls itself "103.3 The Edge," broadcasting an alternative rock format. The studios are located on the east side of Buffalo on James E. Casey Drive.

WEDG's transmitter is sited on Kensington Avenue, near the Kensington Expressway (New York State Route 33).

== History ==
=== WYSL-FM, WPHD, WUFX ===
The station signed on the air in 1947. WYSL-FM was the FM counterpart to WYSL (then at 1080 AM, now WUFO; WYSL later moved to 1400 AM in a frequency and ownership swap, with that station now known as WWWS). The station switched its call sign to WPHD in 1970. WPHD mostly simulcast WYSL but played free form underground music overnight. The rock format caught on with listeners, and by 1972, WPHD-FM had dethroned WKBW as Buffalo's most-listened-to station during the evening hours, the first time an FM station had achieved the feat in any daypart. Despite the success, Larry Levite (representing owner Gordon McLendon) and his national program director Ken Dowe were upset that they felt the station was not playing enough hits and allowing the hosts to indulge in too much material that would not appeal to a broad audience, and thus removed over 90% of the station's playlist to bring the library down to 500 records. Evening disc jockey Jim Santella, angry at the meddling in his program, publicly resigned from his program on-air, as did local program director Jack Robinson, who had unsuccessfully tried to compromise with Dowe and Levite.

This album-oriented rock format made WPHD popular, along with its morning duo, Robert W. Taylor and Harv Moore, whose show ran from 1978 to 1989. Moore had already achieved major market success at WPGC in Washington, DC.

On September 23, 1989, the station changed call signs to WUFX, and rebranded as "103.3 The Fox". Taylor and Moore were fired and a new morning drive time show debuted, "Shredd and Ragan". Both Taylor and Moore eventually were hired at WHTT-FM, which is now WEDG's sister station. Taylor is now retired and Moore went on to stints at WECK, WHLD, and then back to WECK. Taylor later served as WECK's imaging voice. Moore died December 21, 2025, age 90.

=== WEDG ===
On June 23, 1995, the station adopted an alternative rock format, changed call letters to WEDG, and rebranded as "103.3 The Edge". At the time, Toronto radio station 102.1 CFNY-FM was making inroads in Western New York, and also rebranded itself "The Edge" shortly after the sign-on of WEDG. Because CFNY is a Canadian radio station, it was outside Jacobs Media's trademark on "The Edge" radio brand for U.S. stations.

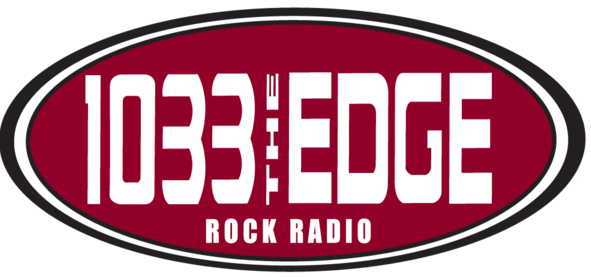
Logo under previous slogan

After some time playing alternative, WEDG began leaning towards a harder edged active rock direction in 2005 after then-rival 92.9 WBUF flipped from active rock to hot talk. After a few years, WEDG rotated in more "classic" hard rock/heavy metal artists alongside current and recent releases in the station playlist. WEDG was limited in how much classic material it could play, to avoid cannibalizing listeners from classic rock sister station, 96.9 WGRF. WEDG began streaming on the Internet in 2006.

Beginning in late 2014, WEDG began shifting from active rock back to the station's heritage alternative rock roots, while still maintaining a few active rock songs in rotation. By the beginning of 2016, WEDG dropped the "Rock Radio" prefix and re-imaged the station as "Buffalo. Rock. Alternative.", reflecting a nearly 25-year tenure as Buffalo's modern rock outlet. The station usually has top ratings for Men 25–49 in the Buffalo radio market.

=== Sports coverage ===
For years, WEDG was the co-flagship of the Buffalo Bills Radio Network with sister station 96.9 WGRF. Parent company Cumulus Media decided not to renew the contract with the Bills' network at the end of 2011. It was announced on January 4, 2012, that the Bills would move to Entercom Communications station WGR 550 AM starting with the 2012-2013 NFL season.

In 2015, WEDG picked up the NFL on Westwood One in a simulcast deal with sister station WHLD 1270 AM.

== The Shredd and Ragan Show ==
Shredd and Ragan were longest-serving personalities at the station, hosting the morning drive time shift from 1994. They were moved from mornings after 12 years to make way for the syndicated "Opie and Anthony" show from New York City. That marked a homecoming for Gregg "Opie" Hughes, who was a former WUFX staffer. After O&A was dropped from the schedule in July 2008, Program Director (then known as) "Evil" Jim Kurdziel hosted the morning shift on an interim basis until August 25, 2008, when midday host Rich "Bull" Gaenzler was named the permanent host. It was announced in early January 2012 that the Shredd and Ragan show was returning to mornings starting January 9, 2012.

Shredd and Ragan were reassigned to WGRF in August 2021. Cassiday Proctor and Anthony Wise were named the replacement morning team four months later. Their show is called "Cass & Anthony".
