= Big Jack Armstrong =

American radio DJ (1945–2008)

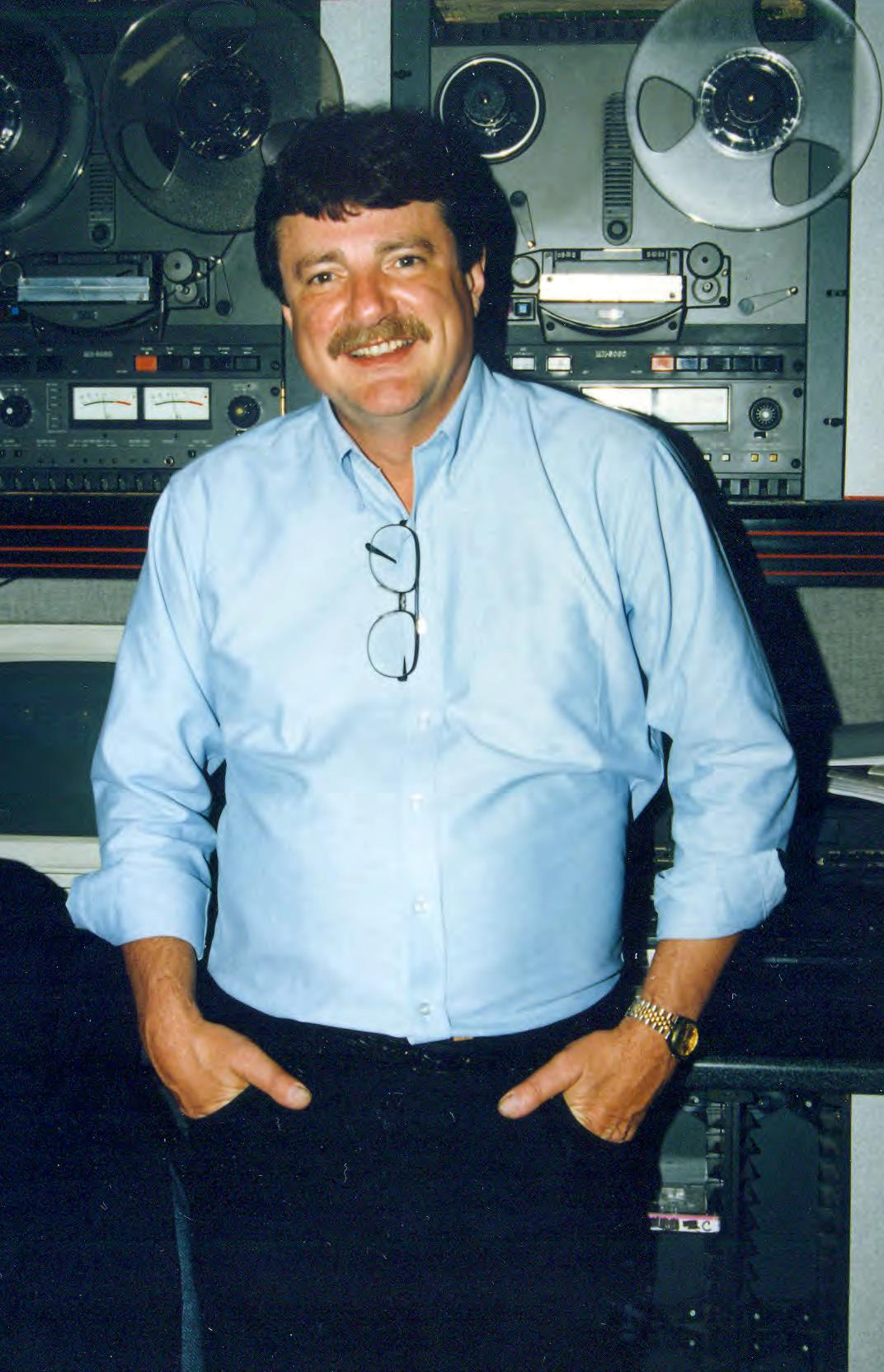
- Disc Jockey Jack Armstrong, at his last job in Greensboro, North Carolina
- Born: John Charles Larsh; December 4, 1945; Chapel Hill, North Carolina
- Died: March 21, 2008 (aged 62); High Point, North Carolina
- Presenting career
- Show: Jack Armstrong Show, Jack Armstrong Go-round, The Jack Armstrong Experience

Big Jack Armstrong (born John Charles Larsh on December 4, 1945, in Durham County, North Carolina; died March 23, 2008, in High Point, North Carolina), also known as Jack Armstrong, Jackson W. Armstrong, and Big Jack Your Leader, was a top-40 disc jockey of the 1960s through the 1980s, and an oldies DJ until 2006.

His parents were John Edgar Larsh, Jr., who was a professor in the School of Medicine at the University of North Carolina, and Ruth Ella Neal. His father once served as the acting dean of UNC's School of Pharmacy.

He held a Guinness World Record for "fastest talking human alive" at one point in his career. He created two imaginary characters: the Gorilla, who speaks in a raspy bass, and the Old Timer, who wheezes and tells jokes.

Larsh was known for his distinctive signoff. At WKYC, it was a few catchphrases, spoken over the instrumental version of The Beatles' "And I Love Her". On WKBW, he used "Shimmy Shimmy Walk II" by the Megatons. On most stations, he used no background music. Eventually, it became a Motormouth extravaganza, spoken so fast it was hard to understand.

== Career ==
Larsh began his radio career at WCHL in Chapel Hill, North Carolina in 1960 at the age of 14 as an after-school and weekend job. He also worked at WCDJ in Edenton in the summer when his family would go back home during summer break. At some point, he worked for WSSB in Durham, but the time frame is unclear.

Upon graduating from high school in 1964, Larsh moved to Atlanta, where he got an FCC First Class engineer's license, while working on the radio at WDJK. His parents enrolled him in Guilford College in Greensboro in the pre-med course. Larsh dropped out almost immediately, having gotten a radio job at WCOG.

In early 1966, WAYS in Charlotte had begun 24-hour operations. Federal Communications Commission (FCC) regulations at the time required that any station must have an engineer on duty at all times the station was on the air. When Larsh applied for a job there, the station quickly saw an opportunity to fill two sets of shoes with one person, since Larsh already had a First Class license. He was hired to fill the overnight shift.

At WAYS, Larsh met Jack Gale, a seasoned veteran of both the radio and music business who would become his mentor. Larsh later remarked, "Jack (Gale) has forgotten more about the radio business than I've ever known." When asked, he often cited Gale as one of his major influences.

Larsh's first big break came later in 1966, when he landed a job at WIXY/1260 in Cleveland, Ohio. They decided that the evening disc jockey would be called 'Jack Armstrong' after the 1930s’ radio serial Jack Armstrong the All American Boy. With his fast-talking, young, friendly approach, Larsh became a huge hit in Cleveland - and then, in a dispute with management, secured his release, and went to work for WKYC 1100, a 50,000-watt station there, in January 1967.

'Jack Armstrong' was a copyrighted moniker in the market, so Larsh adopted the alias 'Big Jack Your Leader', and went to work for WKYC. He also occasionally taunted WIXY by calling himself Jackson W. Armstrong.

With WKYC heard all over the eastern half of the US, Larsh went national. He attracted fans all over the region, and became a huge hit. WKYC was listed as the number three record-buying influence in Miami in that era, no doubt due to 'Big Jack' and the 50,000-watt night signal that was so strong over the East Coast of the US.

Larsh moved on, working at other 50,000-watt stations such as WMEX/1510 in Boston; CHUM/1050 in Toronto; KFI/640 in Los Angeles, KTNQ/1020 in Los Angeles, and WKBW/1520 in Buffalo, New York. At the latter, he developed his 'Motormouth' character, and was listed in the Guinness Book of World Records in 1971 as the world's fastest-talking human. He participated in WKBW's 1971 "War of the Worlds" broadcast, a modernized version of the original done by Orson Welles in 1938. Larsh was one of the original disc jockeys hired for the all-new 13-Q in Pittsburgh in the early 1970s. In the late '70s, he could be heard on Indianapolis' 1310 WIFE before it went dark.

Larsh also worked at KFRC, The Big 610 in the early 1980s, dominating the midday, late-night, and overnight shifts at the station. Later on, he became part of 93 KKHR in Los Angeles, doing afternoons. In the late 80s, he worked at Power 98 in Myrtle Beach. His late career was spent doing mornings at WMQX Oldies 93 in Greensboro, North Carolina, and voice tracking nights on Entercom Communications sister station WWKB in Buffalo.

Larsh was working at WWKB/1520 in Buffalo, New York, when the sudden format change in 2006 to liberal talk put him in the unemployed ranks. Larsh took this opportunity putting pen to paper and wrote his biography, which was completed four months before his death. For a number of years, Larsh used the name Jack Armstrong as the morning DJ on the hugely popular station, Oldies 93 in Greensboro NC. His morning show led the ratings in the area and he continued working from home for WWKB until they changed formats. He continued on at Oldies 93 until they changed format to country, at which time he retired.

On March 22, 2008, Larsh died at his home in High Point, North Carolina as a result of a stroke or heart attack. (An autopsy was not performed.)
