= Ramblin' Lou Schriver =

American musician (1929–2016)

Louis Albert "Ramblin' Lou" Schriver (July 19, 1929 – January 17, 2016) was an American country musician and radio broadcaster who lived in western New York State.

Schriver began his radio career in 1947, performing live music at WJJL in Niagara Falls. He was the first person to broadcast country music over the Western New York airwaves. He moved to Buffalo's WWOL in 1964 as the station flipped to a country music format. In 1970, Schriver bought WMMJ and renamed it WXRL; the "RL" in reference to his initials.

Schriver performed in Western New York, Southern Ontario, and beyond. In 1951 his band, the Twin Pine Mountaineers, recorded and released an album for Sparton Records. He appeared on the Grand Ole Opry and the WWVA Jamboree, and was an annual performer at the Erie County Fair for 51 years until 2015.

A preeminent country music promoter, Schriver brought numerous acts to Buffalo and Niagara Falls, including Elvis Presley, Buck Owens, Johnny Cash, and Hank Williams.

Schriver was a 1985 inductee of the Country Radio Broadcasters Hall of Fame, was a charter member of the Buffalo Broadcasters Hall of Fame, and was a 1996 inductee of the Buffalo Music Hall of Fame.

A native of Tonawanda, New York, Schriver was a resident of Grand Island since the 1960s. He married his wife, Joanie Marshall, on May 20, 1961. Together with their children, they performed locally and internationally as the "Ramblin' Lou Family Band." Ramblin' Lou broadcast his radio show on WXRL until December 26, 2015, 22 days before his death. He was survived by his wife, four children, and numerous grandchildren.
