= WFWO =

Radio station in Medina, New York

Totally Gospel Radio Network
Medina, New York; United States
- Broadcast area: Niagara Frontier
- Branding: Totally Gospel

Programming
- Language: English
- Format: Defunct (was Black Gospel)

Ownership
- Owner: FELLOWSHIPWORLD, INC.

History
- First air date: 2010
- Last air date: February 12, 2013
- Call sign meaning: Fellowship WOrld

Technical information
- Facility ID: 172262
- Class: A
- ERP: 400 watts
- HAAT: 40 meters
- Transmitter coordinates: 43°14′33″N 78°18′27″W

Links
- Website: website

WFWO (89.7 FM) was a radio station located in Medina, New York and broadcasting at a frequency of 89.7 MHz (Channel 209) with 400 watts of effective radiated power from an antenna 40 meters height above average terrain. The station was owned by FellowshipWorld, which had previously carried its programming on AM 1120 in Buffalo.

WFWO signed on in 2010. On February 12, 2013, WFWO went silent. It applied for an extension of its special temporary authority to remain silent on November 1, 2013. The station had been rebuked by the FCC for attempting to broadcast from a tower in Buffalo instead of their city of license (Medina) without FCC permission. On August 26, 2014, the FCC cancelled WFWO's license.

A separate license on the 89.7 frequency was awarded to the neighboring village of Albion shortly thereafter. That station, W209BF, operates on a much lower power (38 watts) and simulcasts the Family Life Network.
