= WYRK =

Coordinates: 42.886°N 78.873°W

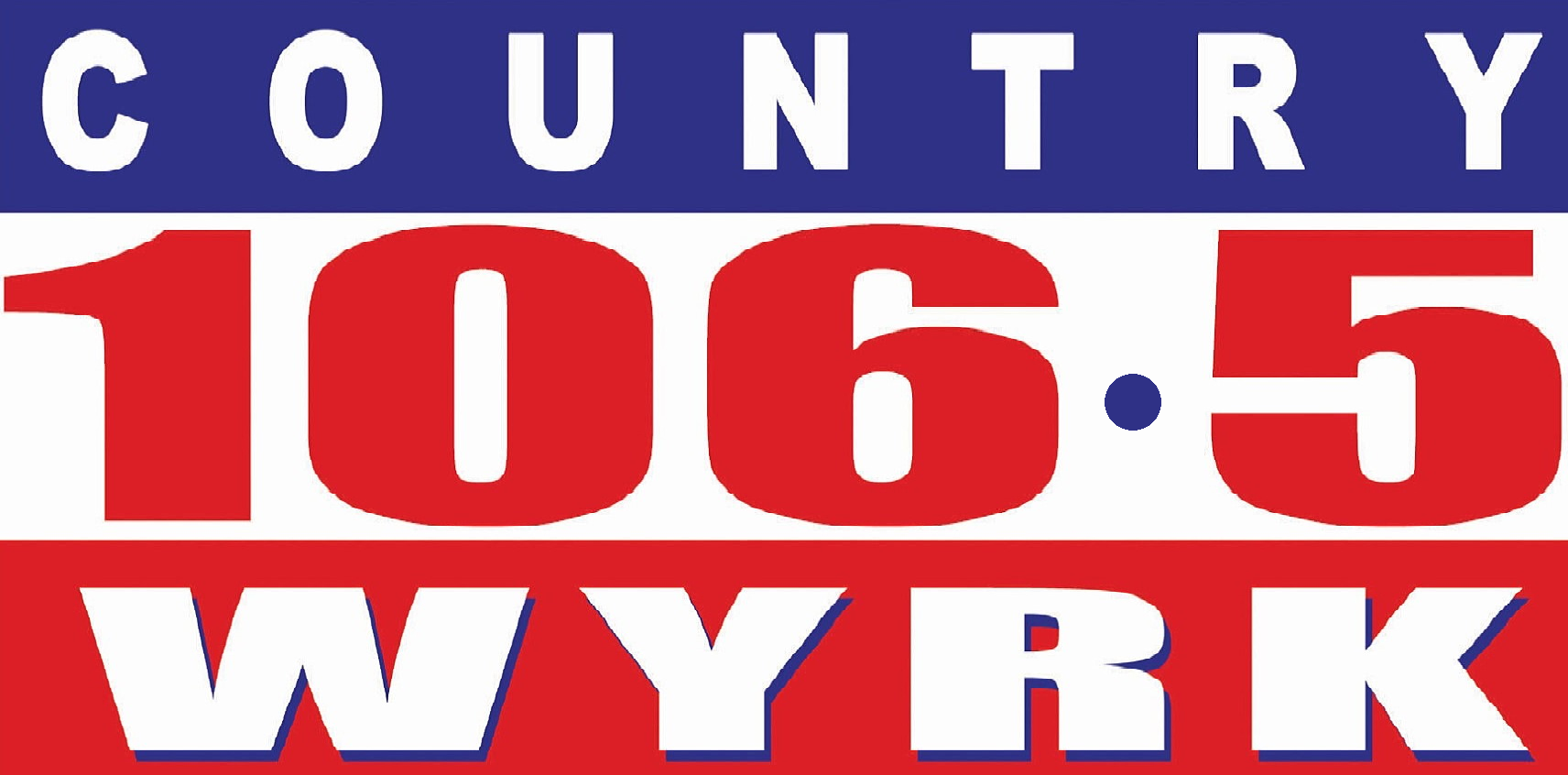

Buffalo, New York; United States
- Broadcast area: Western New York
- Frequency: 106.5 MHz (HD Radio)
- Branding: Country 106.5 WYRK

Programming
- Format: Country
- Affiliations: Compass Media Networks

Ownership
- Owner: Townsquare Media; (Townsquare Media of Buffalo, Inc.)
- Sister stations: WBLK, WBUF, WTSS

History
- First air date: November 12, 1962
- Former call signs: WADV (1962–1981)
- Call sign meaning: Western New York

Technical information
- Licensing authority: FCC
- Facility ID: 1908
- Class: B
- ERP: 50,000 watts
- HAAT: 142 meters (466 ft)

Links
- Public license information: Public file; LMS
- Webcast: Listen Live
- Website: wyrk.com

WYRK (106.5 FM) is a commercial radio station in Buffalo, New York, and serving Western New York. It is owned by Townsquare Media and it broadcasts a country music radio format. The studios and offices are on Lafayette Square in Buffalo in the Rand Building, 12th Floor.

WYRK has an effective radiated power (ERP) of 50,000 watts. The transmitter is atop the Rand Building.

== History ==
=== WADV ===
The station signed on the air on November 12, 1962, as WADV. The 106.5 MHz frequency that was originally assigned in 1946 to WBEN-FM (now WBKV), which had moved to 102.5 MHz in 1959. WADV had a MOR/easy listening format, and was the first station in Western New York to air an FM stereo signal. Dan and Nancy Lesniak owned the station under the name "Adver-Cast, Inc.," from which it drew its original call sign. Initially sharing a church office with a scouting troop, the station moved to the Rand Building a year after sign on, where the station has remained ever since.

Dan Lesniak, who had previously been a disc jockey at WWOL prior to launching WADV, became terminally ill in 1981 and sold the station to Stoner Communications; he died a year later.

=== WYRK ===
Stoner immediately changed the station to a country music format and adopted the call sign used today. The initial format was semi-automated, with live disc jockeys added a few years later. The station was not immediately successful. Ramblin' Lou Schriver-owned WXRL 1300 AM had been Buffalo's heritage country outlet for over a decade by the time WYRK had adopted the format. WYRK received a major boost in popularity with country music's shift in style in the early 1990s and embraced the new country sound. In the 1990s, most country music listeners had shifted from hearing the format on AM radio to the FM band.

WYRK, according to the Nielsen ratings service, is often the most popular radio station in Western New York. WYRK remains a largely local operation, with the only syndicated programs on the station being Taste of Country Nights weekday evenings at 7 pm, Bob Kingsley's Country Top 40 on Sunday morning at 10 am, and American Country Countdown on Sunday evening at 10 pm.

WYRK began streaming its programming on the Internet in November 2006.

== Concerts ==
WYRK usually hosts three concert series each year. The longest-running is the Taste of Country that is held every year in June. This event, held at Sahlen Field, celebrated its 16th anniversary on June 12, 2015, with performances by Dierks Bentley, Joe Nichols, Frankie Ballard, Canaan Smith and A Thousand Horses. Its recent series additions are acoustic concerts with one held in the fall and one held in the winter. These feature performances by up-and-coming national artists and can be seen at the UB Center for the Arts.

In 2013, WYRK hosted the Taste of Country June 14 with acts including Darius Rucker, Sheryl Crow, Rodney Atkins, Gloriana, and Jana Kramer.
