= WHTT-FM =

Coordinates: 42.831°N 78.800°W

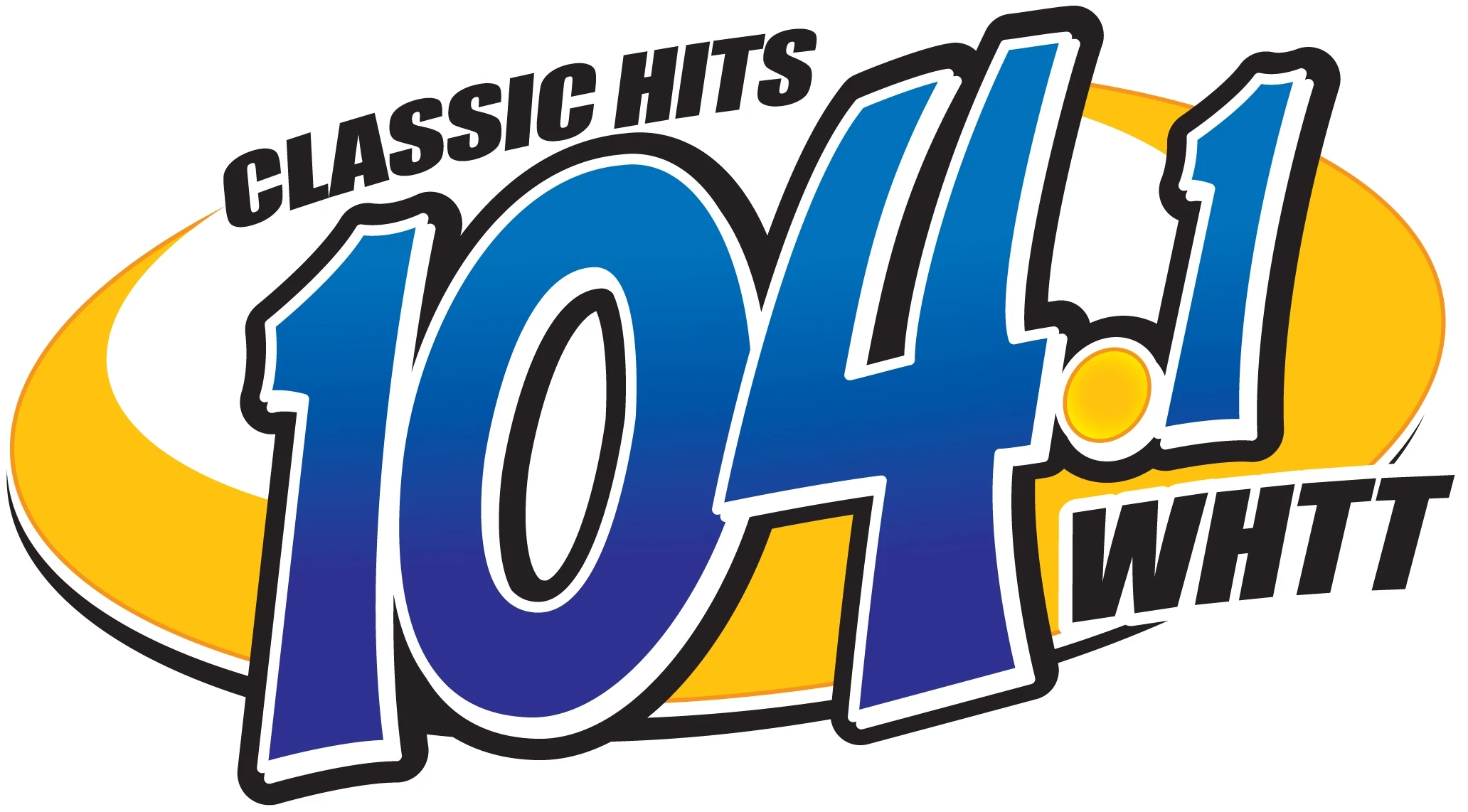

Buffalo, New York; United States
- Broadcast area: Western New York
- Frequency: 104.1 MHz
- Branding: Classic Hits 104.1 WHTT

Programming
- Language: English
- Format: Classic hits
- Affiliations: Compass Media Networks; Premiere Networks; Westwood One

Ownership
- Owner: Cumulus Media; (Radio License Holding CBC, LLC)
- Sister stations: WBBF; WEDG; WGRF

History
- First air date: 1947
- Former call signs: WWOL-FM (1947–1979); WWOR (1979–1980); WACJ (1980–1982); WNYS-FM (1982–1986)
- Call sign meaning: Classic Hits

Technical information
- Licensing authority: FCC
- Facility ID: 53968
- Class: B
- ERP: 50,000 watts
- HAAT: 118 meters (387 ft)

Links
- Public license information: Public file; LMS
- Webcast: Listen live
- Website: www.whtt.com

WHTT-FM (104.1 MHz) is a commercial radio station in Buffalo, New York, serving Western New York. It is owned by Cumulus Media and broadcasts a classic hits format, simply calling itself "Classic Hits 104.1". The studios and offices are on James E. Casey Drive in Buffalo.

WHTT has an effective radiated power (ERP) of 50,000 watts, the maximum for most of New York. The transmitter is off Dorrance Avenue in West Seneca, next to Abbott Road Plaza.

== Station history ==
=== Early years ===
The station signed on in 1947. Its call sign was WWOL-FM, with its studios in Lackawanna. One of the station's early disc jockeys was Guy King, who later found fame under the name Tom Clay. Two others would start their own stations after runs at WWOL: Dan Lesniak launched WADV (now WYRK), while country musician Ramblin' Lou Schriver put WXRL on the air. Joey Reynolds also briefly worked at the station in the 1950s.

The station also held the call letters WWOR and WACJ. It changed call signs to WNYS in 1982 when it flipped to a Top 40/CHR format, later taking on the name "Hot 104 WNYS". During the Top 40/CHR years, the station employed the female comic and syndicated progressive talk host Stephanie Miller. Another employee of this era was Jay Thomas, who after his brief run at this station (and numerous others) found fame as a DJ, comedian, and actor.

=== Classic hits and oldies ===
The station changed formats and call letters in the autumn of 1986, switching to classic hits with the motto "Classic Hits 104.1, The All New WHTT". The station was one of the first to take the "classic hits" name in the United States, and did so due to the lack of a classic rock station in Buffalo after WGRQ (96.9 FM) switched to adult contemporary music. In May 1989, after 96.9 FM (which had the WRLT call letters at the time) went back to classic rock as WGRF, WHTT became an oldies music outlet playing hits centered on the 1960s, less rock-oriented than the classic rock stations with which it was competing and slightly newer than the 1950s-centric oldies format airing on what was then WGKT. WHTT adopted the on air branding "Oldies 104". Danny Neaverth was the station's long-running morning host during the Oldies 104 era, with Tom Shannon hosting afternoon drive.

In the late 1980s, the call letters and format were also heard on sister AM station 1120 AM (now WBBF); through 2020, WBBF resumed simulcasting WHTT as a temporary measure to keep the AM station's signal occupied after a long-term lease was terminated, before breaking off from the simulcast again in 2021.

=== Adult contemporary ===
By September 2003, the station, like many other oldies stations in the United States, had evolved into a classic hits format, playing a mix of classic rock, soft rock, R&B and pop music hits from the mid-1960s through the 1970s. At this point, the station changed its slogan to "104.1 WHTT, The Greatest Hits Of All Time". In the autumn of 2004, the slogan was modified to "104.1 WHTT Buffalo's Greatest Hits." In November 2006, since its music library now progressed well into the 1980s, it changed yet again to "104.1 WHTT, Buffalo's Best Mix".

The move was carefully timed as the station imaged itself as more of an adult contemporary station as the two AC outlets in Buffalo, WJYE and WTSS, both changed to full-time Christmas music in November and WHTT historically has not. It instead opted for one Christmas song per hour from the day after Thanksgiving up through a few days before Christmas, then increasing to all-Christmas music for the last week before the holiday.

In addition, WHTT added many artists who are staples of the adult contemporary format, such as Madonna, Wilson Phillips, Don Henley, and Sheryl Crow to its playlist while keeping a large amount of 1965–1985 music in rotation, thus shifting towards a gold-based AC.

In late February 2007, WHTT switched to adult contemporary/adult hits and changed its on-air branding to "Mix 104.1", adding current and recent hits from artists such as Kelly Clarkson, Maroon 5, The Goo Goo Dolls, Carrie Underwood and Avril Lavigne, while continuing to phase out 1960s and 1970s music. The station also introduced a brand-new logo. Some of the oldies music was displaced to WGRF. Most of the staff was retained, with Val Townsend coming from WEDG as the afternoon jock to eventually replace longtime jock Harv Moore being the only notable change in the transition.

=== Return to classic hits ===
However, by October 2007, since ratings for the new "Mix" format had fallen somewhat dramatically since its debut, late 1960s and 1970s music slowly returned to WHTT's playlist while current material was reduced back to one song per hour. As of April 2008, the top 8 songs in WHTT's top 100 playlist were all current hits, but the remainder were all songs from the 1970s through the 1990s. By July 2008, the current hits had mostly disappeared from the station's playlist and the station increased its focus on music from the 1970s and 1980s and returned to the playlist several songs from the 1960s, similar to the "Buffalo's Greatest Hits" time period, although it maintained the "Mix" branding. This left WJYE and CHRE-FM as the only adult contemporary radio stations in Buffalo, New York.

The station alternated back and forth; by October 2008, the current hits had regained some prominence. By early 2009, the playlist had evolved back into a programming format nearly identical to the first days as 'Mix'. Later in 2009, the station shifted back toward mostly 1980s music, with current hits getting played two times per hour.

On August 10, 2009, after much insistence from listeners, WHTT officially switched back to its classic hits format, changing its slogan to the late 1980s-era "Classic Hits 104.1 WHTT" and adopting its early-2000s format of 1960s, 1970s and early-mid-1980s music. The move created a marked improvement in the station's ratings.

As of 2024, the station airs a tightly programmed playlist, mostly consisting of 1980s pop hits, occasionally featuring a few songs from the 1960s, 1970s and 1990s.

=== Air personalities ===
Midday jock Val Townsend was removed (but later brought back for a weekend shift), but the rest of the staff was retained in the change. Formerly rounding out the weekends are Brian J Walker and Mike Jacobs. The weekday staff until 2022 consisted of morning host Bill Lacy, midday jock Heather Perry (voicetracked from WWLI in Providence, Rhode Island), and music director/afternoon host Joe Siragusa. Lacy is slated to retire in May 2022. After Billy Lacy Retired in early 2022 he was replaced by Laura Daniels who started at the station on August 19, 2022, and remains the host in the mornings.

As of 2025 the current live jocks Monday - Friday are, Laura Daniels, Joe Siragusa and Russ Burton.

==== Oldiesfest ====
Starting in the 1990s, the station held an annual concert event known as "Oldiesfest" each summer featuring many musical acts from the 1950s and 1960s. The last "Oldiesfest" was held in 2004 and featured performers from the groups Badfinger, Gallery, and Blood, Sweat and Tears.

== Internet streaming ==
In November 2005, WHTT launched a "Holiday Music Channel" internet stream. The "Holiday Music Channel" played Christmas music and was meant to complement WHTTs regular lineup, which had largely continued its normal playlist throughout the holiday season. Said channel was revived in 2006.

In March 2006, Citadel launched an initiative that provided for the streaming of many of Citadel's stations. WHTT was one of them, and was among the first commercial stations in Buffalo to resume streaming. WHTT previously provided a popular internet stream from the mid-1990s through 2001. That stream was halted after continuing uncertainty over rights issues related to the streaming of radio broadcast programming over the Internet, including issues regarding demands for additional fees for the streaming of recorded music and radio commercials. After working out technicalities with various industry trade unions many stations, including WHTT, resumed their internet stream but without airing the commercials listeners hear on the FM broadcast.

== Previous stations assigned WHTT call letters ==
Several noted radio stations were issued the WHTT call sign by the United States government agency FCC, previous to 104.1FM in Buffalo, New York.

- From March 9, 1983–July 7, 1986 the call letters were assigned to a CBS owned and operated Top 40/Hot Hits formatted station known as "Hitradio WHTT" in the Boston, Massachusetts, radio market. "Hitradio WHTT" finished number one in the Arbitron radio ratings in the Boston market for several seasonal based ratings books in 1983 and 1984.
- Starting on August 4, 1980–1982 the WHTT calls were used for an AM radio station in Miami, Florida, "Radio Hit 1260". "Radio Hit 1260" was one of several stations influential in establishing Spanish language hit music as a viable format in the United States. The station mixed Latin Pop Music singles and some English language Top 40 music along with news and information aimed at the Miami areas growing Latin American and Caribbean Spanish speaking population. WHTT in Miami was the AM sister to popular FM Top 40 station WHYI "Y-100" and by late 1980 was becoming successful in the Arbitron ratings. In April 1981, the transmitter site for the station was firebombed. Local police suspected the individuals responsible were upset about both the switch from the previous format (AM 1260 from 1969–1980 was the once popular country music station WWOK) and the increasing Hispanic population and presence in Miami. The station was on less than 100 watts power for many months greatly weakening the signal and thereby decreasing both the ratings and revenue for "Radio Hit 1260". According to general manager Dave Gleason, the stations owners "Metroplex Communications" lost interest in the format after the firebomb incident.
- WHTT was a country music station located in Davenport, Iowa, from 1975–1978. The station then become longtime AOR rock station WXLP.
