= Danny Neaverth =

American disc jockey

Daniel J. "Danny" Neaverth Sr. (/ˈnɛvrəθ/ NEV-rəth; born May 11, 1938) is an American disc jockey and television personality from Buffalo, New York. He is best known for a run of over 40 years as a morning disc jockey in Buffalo, including 25 years at heritage top-40 and oldies station WKBW/WWKB, another 15 years at oldies/classic hits WHTT-FM and a three-year run at WECK. As of 2026, he currently hosts at WEBR.

== Radio career ==
Neaverth recalled that his first radio work was as a young teenager, when he, his longtime friend and collaborator Joey Reynolds, WEBR jockey Danny McBride, and others set up a closed-circuit radio station at a Boys Club in Buffalo, under a sponsorship deal with a local pizzeria that "paid" the jockeys in free pizza.

Neaverth was personally trained in the art of broadcasting by Jack Curran of Syracuse, New York and did not attend college. (As a running gag, Neaverth often claims he "went to Syracuse"—implying the university with a renowned communications school—when asked about his education, a vagary that he says benefited him in finding work.) He began his career at WFRM in Coudersport, Pennsylvania in 1957, where he served as afternoon jock. In 1959, he went to WDOE and then on to WBNY in Buffalo, the city's first rock and roll station. Neaverth also recalled brief stints at WKBW (before his much longer run at the station) and WGR, and a short-lived stint at WNDR in Syracuse, which Neaverth was reluctant to take because of his wife's reluctance to travel or relocate, and thus ended by mutual agreement after less than a week. By 1961, WKBW had lured him back to host the afternoon drive time slot (he became the station's morning host in 1970). Becoming known for the tagline, written by Tommy Calandra, "Danny moves your fanny in the morning!", and the catch phrase "I got up early so I could be the first kid on the block to say good morning to you" among many others, Neaverth spent 26 years at WKBW through top 40, adult contemporary and oldies formats before an ownership change and a format change to talk radio led to his termination in the late 1980s. During his time in Buffalo, he co-recorded a comedy record, "Rats in my Room" (an expanded and rearranged cover of a Leona Anderson song) along with fellow WKBW jock Joey Reynolds, that was a regional hit, in 1963. For his expansion and rearrangement work, Neaverth was required to join BMI and received $80 in royalties; he was disappointed to find that airplay of "Rats in my Room" had dropped off to zero after only two months and only once (when David Letterman played it on Late Night) did it ever get another spin; he never received the $7.69 royalty for Letterman's usage.

Neaverth, on behalf of WKBW, was offered the chance to bring The Beatles to Buffalo Memorial Auditorium on February 10, 1964, the day after the band had appeared on The Ed Sullivan Show. It would have been the Beatles' first concert in North America. Neaverth, not willing to risk the $3500 appearance fee for a Monday night concert in the poor February weather for an unproven band he did not expect to sell out the auditorium declined the offer. It was not until after Beatlemania swept the nation that Neaverth acknowledged that his move was a mistake as the city would never again have the opportunity to bring the Beatles to Buffalo and it would be over five decades before the Beatles' Paul McCartney would perform in the city.

His absence from radio in the late 1980s was short-lived, as he would quickly find his way to WHTT-FM, which was launching an oldies format of its own and already employed two of Neaverth's sons and his daughter-in-law, PJ Foxx. (Neaverth recalled how his friend, WKBW program director Sandy Beach, had briefly brought on Neaverth's son Dan Jr. as a sportscaster before ownership imposed a rule forbidding the company from hiring members of the same family; when Beach left for WHTT, he hired Dan Jr., and since WHTT's owner had no such policy, hired Dan Sr. and his adopted son Darren as well.) Neaverth spent another decade at WHTT, again as morning jock, until being dismissed in a cost-cutting move in 2002. Shortly thereafter, he came out of retirement for another three year stretch at a revived "WKBW," where he (along with the oldies format in general) quadrupled the station's Arbitron ratings. After three years, WKBW's owner decided to pull the plug on oldies again, and Neaverth spent the next decade in semi-retirement.

On May 4, 2017, Neaverth was added to the airstaff at WECK, hosting a weekly oldies program on Friday afternoons. Neaverth moved his show to Monday mornings in February 2019, reuniting him with Tom Donahue, his newsman at WWKB and WHTT. He was displaced from the Monday morning position in October 2019 after the station hired Roger Christian to fill the position. Neaverth was fired in April 2020 in a public argument with WECK owner Buddy Shula over how his co-workers were treated during the coronavirus outbreak. He has remained mostly in retirement since then but has been active on social media with his tongue-in-cheek production "Danny Needs a Job" and has hinted that he would not turn down another job offer in Buffalo if one were given. In January 2026, that opportunity arose when WEBR brought Neaverth in to host a weekly Wednesday night show, Healing with Humor. Though the series was short-lived, WEBR owner Bill Yuhnke retained Neaverth's services as a spokesman for his Liberty Cab service.

Neaverth is a member of the Buffalo Broadcast Pioneers Hall of Fame and the New York State Broadcasters Association Hall of Fame.

== Other appearances ==
Neaverth also had a very long run as the public address announcer for the Buffalo Bills for 13 years. He also served as the public address announcer for the Buffalo Braves throughout the team's existence.

As part of his work with WKBW, he and his fellow disc jockeys played as part of the "KB Yo-Yo Basketball Team," a Washington Generals-like sports entertainment squad that would travel to local schools and play charity games against teachers, deliberately losing every time.

Neaverth has also been seen frequently on television. Neaverth, while still doing disc jockey work at WKBW, also served as noon weatherman for sister station WKBW-TV, despite taking all the forecasts from Accuweather and admittedly not knowing at all what he was doing. In the late 1980s, Neaverth moved to WGRZ-TV and hosted the talk show Nearly Noon with Dan Neaverth, which lasted roughly two years before WGRZ cancelled all of its non-news programs; Neaverth pressed WGRZ to honor his contract and was assigned to report to work and do nothing until the contract was fulfilled. 2016, he began producing a series of segments called I've Been Thinking for WBBZ-TV.

Neaverth can also occasionally be seen hosting infomercials and commercials.

Neaverth is the subject of the documentary The Kid from Keppel Street, which was released on WBBZ-TV in December 2025.

== Personal life ==
Neaverth, who originally came from South Buffalo, resides in Orchard Park, New York. He attended and graduated from Bishop Timon high school in South Buffalo, New York. His wife of 59 years, the former Marie Seifert, died August 17, 2017. The marriage produced one biological son, Dan Neaverth Jr., who served as a fire chief for Orchard Park and an occasional radio personality; the couple also adopted three sons, Darren, David and Dean. Neaverth is a registered Democrat but also identifies as a regular listener to conservative talk radio shows on WBEN.
