= WECK =

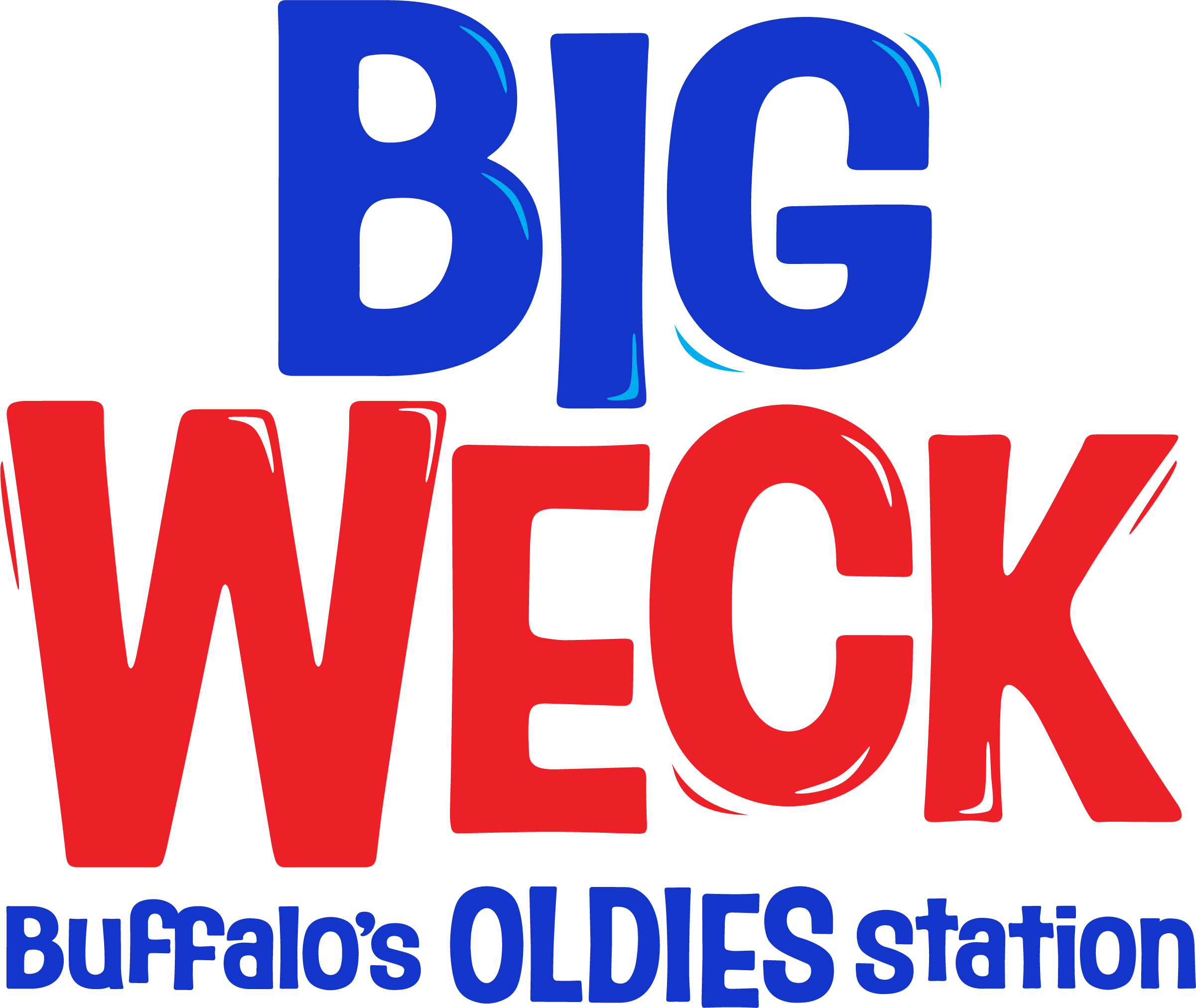
- Cheektowaga, New York; United States
- Broadcast area: Buffalo–Niagara Falls metropolitan area
- Frequency: 1230 kHz
- Branding: The BIG WECK

Programming
- Language: English
- Format: Oldies

Ownership
- Owner: Buddy Shula; (Radio One Buffalo, LLC)
- Sister stations: WUSW

History
- First air date: August 1956
- Former call signs: WNIA (1956–1979)
- Call sign meaning: Kummelweck

Technical information
- Licensing authority: FCC
- Facility ID: 1914
- Class: C
- Power: 1,000 watts
- Transmitter coordinates: 42°55′27″N 78°46′41″W
- Translators: 100.1 W261EB (Lancaster); 100.5 W263DC (Tonawanda); 102.9 W275BB (Cheektowaga)

Links
- Public license information: Public file; LMS
- Webcast: Listen live
- Website: www.bigweck.com

WECK (1230 kHz) is a commercial AM radio station licensed to Cheektowaga, New York and serving the Buffalo–Niagara Falls Metropolitan Area. The station airs a locally produced and locally hosted oldies music format. The studios, offices and transmitter are located on Genesee Street in suburban Cheektowaga. WECK's programming is simulcast on three FM translator stations on 100.1, 100.5, and 102.9 MHz. The station is owned by Radio One Buffalo, LLC, headed by William Ostrander, also known as Buddy Shula.

== History ==
=== Early years ===
In August 1956, the station first signed on as WNIA. The call letters referred to nearby Niagara Falls. The station was founded by Gordon P. Brown, who also owned WSAY (now WXXI) in Rochester, New York. At both Brown's stations, in Buffalo and Rochester, the on-air personalities were assigned stage names. Those names stayed the same, although the talent, typically less experienced broadcasters, came and went. Names like Mike Melody, Tom Thomas and Jerry Jack were used for years on the stations, with different people assuming those names; one of the Mike Melodies, Roger Christian, went on to fame as a songwriter after leaving Buffalo. (The later Roger Christian who achieved more lasting fame in Buffalo radio and currently works at WECK is a different person who uses the Roger Christian name as an alias.)

In 1979, the programming shifted to a Top 40/oldies hybrid format. Original air personalities included Chuck McCoy, Jeff Reinhardt (Program Director), Mark Phillips, J.R. Russ, Barbra Lynne and part-time announcers Art Zelasko, Mike Brown, Ricky Banks, David J. Miller, Jon Park, Dr. Jim Rose and newscaster Pam Kloc. As a way to connect the station locally, the station aligned with a popular local sandwich consisting of roast beef on a Kimmelweck roll or "Beef on Weck," the station switched its call letters to "WECK," branding itself as "The Roll That Rocks."

=== Sale to Quid Me Broadcasting ===
After Brown's death, WNIA was sold to Quid Me Broadcasting, a group headed by local broadcast sales executive Chet Musialowski. Musialowski served as General Manager between (1980–1988).

=== Music of Your Life ===
In 1981, as listening to contemporary music on AM radio declined, WECK began airing Adult Standards using the syndicated "Music of Your Life" format, created by record executive and jingle writer Al Ham. Ham had created the format in 1978 and it came to air on 200 stations across the United States.

The station was given a regular adult standards formula to implement. Ham's strategy worked well. More stations joined the network during the 1980s. Another strategy developed by Ham in the early 1980s for his national format was having recorded messages by the very stars being played, such as, "This is Perry Como, and I'd like to thank you for making us all a part of the Music of Your Life."

In the meantime, J.R. Russ was put in charge of the local implementation of Ham's format and the station maintained a live on-air staff including Jim Nowicki in mornings (and earlier, Guy Michaels), Joe Kozma, Aaron Christopher (Russ' air name), Tim White, Dave Prescott (radio name of the late Joseph Skurzewski), Lynn Dixon, Ray Rogers, News Director Bruce Allen, Dave Teresa and Sports Director Walt Hankin.

After some initial success, Russ soon determined that Ham's small music library repeated songs too often and enlisted the staff to wade through piles of record albums collected by previous owner Gordon Brown, literally knee-deep, in the station's Cheektowaga basement to expand the playlist to over 2,000 songs with a "power rotation" of the biggest and most familiar hits. The station continued licensing the "Music of Your Life" name but, programmed the format in-house and songs were considered for air if they met 2 of 3 criteria: Familiar song, Familiar Artist and Fits the "texture or sound" of the station as Jazz selections might fit a Jazz station's sound.

In 1981 the trade publications like "Inside Radio" touted headlines of: "WECK takes town by storm" and "WECK skyrockets into contention." Radio and Records designated WECK as a "Fastest Mover" up the ratings ladder. The station was a big hit with of Buffalo's large adult population as WECK grew from a 23rd place "no show" in the ratings at the time of the format change (on 4/4/81) to an all-time high of #4 in the market in the Spring 1983 ratings. The 1,000-watt AM station garnered a 7.2 share of all 12+ listeners, beating most FM, and every area AM station (including 50,000-watt WWKB) except #1 WBEN. The Radio and Records Directory also listed WECK as #4 in the entire U.S. in Average Quarter Hour listening (AQH) among stations with similar formats.

Russ went on to the Major Markets of Baltimore, Washington, D.C. and Philadelphia but returned to the Buffalo airwaves on 1440 WEBR with a Saturday and Sunday night airing of his Movie Ticket Radio(TM) "movie hits" format until the 2023 departure of Program Director Dave Gillen.

=== CBS ownership ===
Quid Me Broadcasting sold the station to CBS Radio in 1988. WECK continued with a nostalgia music format, but became satellite automated, maintaining only a live, local show in morning drive. Portions of the station's programming came from the Music of Your Life network, although the station switched to Westwood One's Adult Standards satellite feed for a time.

The station was sold to Regent Communications along with the rest of the CBS Buffalo radio cluster in 2006. In February 2006, WECK abruptly dropped the standards format. In an attempt to capitalize on the success of sister station WYRK and "own" country formats in the market, WECK switched to the Jones Radio Network classic country format.

From 2005 to 2008, the station aired Buffalo Bisons baseball games, with the Bisons buying air time from the station for their broadcast.

=== Culver Communications era ===
On November 5, 2007, Dick Greene, owner of WLVL in nearby Lockport, New York, announced that he had purchased WECK for $1.3 million through his company, Culver Communications. On March 12, 2008, Greene launched a new talk radio format, mixed with local and syndicated programming. WECK made headlines with the hiring of Buffalo radio veterans Harv Moore and Tom Donahue to host its morning show. However, just six months after the switch, Moore was released and replaced by local actress Loraine O'Donnell, who was subsequently terminated in June 2011.

WECK acquired the broadcast radio rights to the University of Buffalo Bulls football and men's basketball games for the 2008 season. In 2009, the station acquired the Buffalo-area rights to New York Yankees baseball through the 2011 season. WECK dropped the rights to the UB Bulls athletics teams and they were picked up by WHLD Niagara Falls in the spring of 2013.

WGRZ news was simulcast during WECK's talk radio era. Syndicated programming on WECK toward the end of its talk run included The Laura Ingraham Show, Dennis Miller, First Light and Fox Sports Radio.

On July 12, 2011, Greene ended the talk format. With former operations manager director Tom Schuh rehired as a consultant, WECK returned to the adult standards music format.

In 2013, after WHLD (which was carrying a pure adult standards format at the time) shifted to sports talk, WECK rebranded to its then-current "Timeless" format and reformulated its playlist to reflect an adult standards approach.

Morning host Tom Donahue and Sunday polka music host Ron Dombrowski (who also hosts shows for WXRL during the week and WBBZ-TV on television) continued on WECK, with most other hours covered by the syndicated America's Best Music. In late January 2016, WECK acquired the local broadcast rights to Delilah, the nationally syndicated love-song host who spent the previous two decades on WJYE. The station also aired Canisius College men's basketball.

=== Sale to Radio One Buffalo ===
Buddy Shula, an account executive, and air-personality with Entercom, filed with the FCC and announced his intent to purchase WECK and translator 102.9 FM on March 10, 2017. The sale closed May 3, 2017, at a purchase price of $550,000. Among the station's first moves was to hire Dan Neaverth, the longtime market fixture and former morning host at WKBW and WHTT-FM, for a Friday afternoon on-air position. Neaverth remained with the station until 2020. John Zach, previously WBEN's morning co-host from 1998 to 2016, joined WECK as news director and morning news anchor in July 2017; along with Zach's hiring, the station's national news updates switched from Fox News to CBS News. Zach left the station in February 2018. Steve Cichon filled the position for several months until he departed to focus on his teaching position and was succeeded by Tony Magoo, whose position was eliminated before the end of the year.

Other additions included former WYRK and WHTT-FM morning host Gail Ann Huber as morning co-host, longtime WKBW-TV voice-over artist and air personality, Jon Summers for late mornings, and former WJYE morning host and Program Director Joe Chille for afternoon drive time.

In the summer 2018 ratings, WECK climbed to a top ten in Buffalo ratings.

In late April 2018, the FCC granted the station another translator, W263DC (100.5 FM), as a second Metro signal for WECK. The 100.5 translator is licensed to Tonawanda, to enhance coverage in northern suburbs of Buffalo.

Roger Christian, who had spent 43 years at the station on FM 102.5 from 1976 to 2019), was hired shortly after his departure from that station; Christian was hired as a weekend and fill-in personality. Christian was named morning host in October 2019, later moving to middays after Summers, Moore and Neaverth were removed in coronavirus-related cost reduction measures that eventually were made permanent. It would be Moore's last job before he died in December 2025, age 90.

In early March 2020, the FCC granted the purchase of translator W262CM from Cumulus Media for $50,000. The sale closed March 11, 2020. The FCC also granted this translator to be moved from Buffalo to suburban Lancaster at 250 watts. The translator changed frequencies from 100.3 to 100.1 MHz and adopted the call-sign W261EB.

Donahue announced his retirement from broadcasting in September 2023. Also in late 2023, WECK launched "Big WECK 2," a companion Internet radio service, initially carrying a Halloween music format, then a Christmas music format (with an interruption to cover Beatles A to Z on Black Friday), the companion station shifted to a progressive format of lesser-known oldies programmed by John Piccillo after the holidays. Piccillo had joined WECK in April, following 28 years at WGRF. Big WECK 2 disappeared around April 1, 2024, with Piccillo leaving WECK in July. Piccillo returned to WECK in July 2025.
