= WGRF =

Classic rock radio station in Buffalo, New York

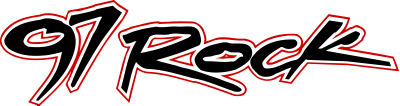
- Buffalo, New York; United States
- Broadcast area: Western New York
- Frequency: 96.9 MHz
- Branding: 97 Rock

Programming
- Format: Classic rock
- Affiliations: United Stations Radio Networks Buffalo Bills Radio Network

Ownership
- Owner: Cumulus Media; (Radio License Holding CBC, LLC)
- Sister stations: WBBF; WEDG; WHTT-FM

History
- First air date: September 14, 1959
- Former call signs: WGR-FM (1959–1973); WGRQ (1973–1985); WRLT (1985–1988); WGR-FM (1988–1991)
- Call sign meaning: derived from former sister station WGR

Technical information
- Licensing authority: FCC
- Facility ID: 56102
- Class: B
- ERP: 24,000 watts
- HAAT: 217 meters (712 ft)
- Transmitter coordinates: 42.954°N 78.876°W

Links
- Public license information: Public file; LMS
- Webcast: Listen live
- Website: 97rock.com

WGRF (96.9 FM) is a commercial radio station in Buffalo, New York, branded as "97 Rock". The station is owned by Cumulus Media and broadcasts a classic rock radio format, mostly from the 1960s, 1970s and 1980s. WGRF competes for classic rock listeners with cross-border rival 91.7 CIXL-FM. The studios are on Buffalo's East Side.

WGRF has an effective radiated power of 24,000 watts. The transmitter is off Elmwood Avenue in Buffalo. It uses a directional antenna to protect CHYM-FM in Kitchener, Ontario, which is on 96.7 MHz.

== History ==
=== Beautiful music ===
WGRF started as the FM sister station to WGR. On September 14, 1959, the station signed on the air as WGR-FM. At first, WGR-AM-FM mostly simulcast a full service, middle of the road (MOR) format of popular adult music, talk and news. By the late 1960s, WGR-FM switched to beautiful music, playing quarter hour sweeps of soft, instrumental cover versions of popular songs.

Over the years, WGRF was owned by the Taft Television and Radio Company, Rich Communications, Mercury Radio Communications and Citadel Broadcasting, a forerunner to current owner Cumulus Media. Mercury Radio separated WGRF from WGR AM in 1995 when it bought WGRF from Rich Communications, which in turn retained WGR until selling it to Sinclair Broadcast Group two years later.

=== Top 40 and AOR ===
In 1973, the station became WGRQ with a Top 40 format known as "Super Q". Its main competition was legendary Top 40 powerhouse WKBW 1520 AM. Not all radios at the time had FM reception, but WGRQ offered the hits in FM stereo. Led by Program Director JJ Jordan, Station Manager William Austin, and a 24-hour live staff, the station shot to the top 4 in the crowded Buffalo market for about two years.

In 1975, flipped to album rock, rebranding as "Q-FM 97", and then as "97 Rock WGRQ-FM". The original "97 Rock" era featured Program Director and DJ John McGhan. By the early 1980s, the station had largely entrenched itself into a styling and format that came to be associated with the nascent classic rock format.

=== AC music and classic rock ===
On January 4, 1985, at 10 a.m., WGRQ dumped its rock format and shifted to an adult contemporary (AC) format as WRLT, firing all but two of the WGRQ airstaff. With the other rock station in Buffalo, 103.3 WPHD and its simulcast partner on 1400, maintaining a more modern focus (as it still does), a domino effect soon followed to fill the void for classic rock. WHTT flipped to a "classic hits" format, and rimshot signal 107.7 began playing classic rock as WBYR.

On September 20, 1988, WRLT changed its call sign back to WGR-FM, switched to classic rock and rehired most of its former DJs under the legendary "97 Rock" name. By the end of the year, WHTT and AM 1400 both changed to oldies, while WBYR flipped to beautiful music. Three years later, WGR-FM changed its call letters to the current WGRF. The station format has largely been unchanged ever since, with most of the staff remaining onboard for the next 27 years.

From 1999 to 2013, WGRF was the flagship station of the Buffalo Bills Radio Network. Every game day, WGRF devoted hours to airing the game as well as pre-game and post-game shows. On May 15, 2026, the Bills announced that WGRF would be returning as their flagship station starting with the 2026 season.

WGRF streamed its programming on the Internet until 2002, when it became economically unfeasible for some stations to continue their streams given changes in licensing and royalty agreements. In March 2006, Citadel launched an initiative that provided for the streaming of many of Citadel's stations. WGRF was among the first commercial stations in Buffalo to resume streaming after the earlier changes.

=== Staffing changes ===
In December 2015, morning host Larry Norton retired from broadcasting. He decided to devote his time to charity and ministry.

In April 2021, WGRF fired the station's program director and the entire morning show, after co-host Rob Lederman had made off-color remarks on the show a month prior. Owner Cumulus Media then brought over longtime WEDG morning show Shredd and Ragan in August 2021 to host WGRF's morning drive time slot.

Midday jock John Piccillo left WGRF in 2023 after 28 years with the station, stating that after three years of hosting his show from home, Cumulus was revoking his permission to do so; he subsequently joined WECK.

Evening jock "Slick Tom" Tiberi, a member of the WGRF airstaff since 1982, was fired from the station in July 2024, after a Facebook post that Tiberi, who is outspoken about his left-wing political views, posted featuring former President Donald Trump in a coffin garnered renewed attention following the assassination attempt on Trump that month. Tiberi attributed his firing to a combination of a vast right-wing conspiracy and corporate belt-tightening at Cumulus, noting that evening jocks like him were increasingly becoming obsolete and that the controversy, especially following Lederman's, provided a convenient pretext to cut his position in favor of automation or syndicated content.

Carl Russo, the station's afternoon jock and the last remaining weekday jock from before 2015, announced his resignation effective April 25, 2025. At the time of his retirement Russo's show was being syndicated nationwide through Westwood One's Classic Rock network.
