= WXRL =

- Lancaster, New York; United States
- Broadcast area: Buffalo metropolitan area
- Frequency: 1300 kHz
- Branding: WXRL

Programming
- Language: English
- Format: Classic country
- Affiliations: United Stations Radio Networks

Ownership
- Owner: Family of Ramblin' Lou Schriver; (Dome Broadcasting Inc.)

History
- First air date: 1965
- Call sign meaning: WX Ramblin' Lou

Technical information
- Licensing authority: FCC
- Facility ID: 17068
- Class: B
- Power: 5,000 watts (day); 2,500 watts (night)
- Transmitter coordinates: 42°52′57.2″N 78°37′52.1″W
- Translator: 95.5 W238DD (Lancaster)

Links
- Public license information: Public file; LMS
- Webcast: Listen live
- Website: www.wxrl.com/index.html

WXRL (1300 AM) is a commercial radio station in Lancaster, New York, serving the Buffalo metropolitan area. It broadcasts a classic country radio format. WXRL is owned and operated by the family of Ramblin' Lou Schriver, a local country music performer, under the name Dome Broadcasting Inc. WXRL's studios and transmitter are on William Street in Lancaster.

By day, WXRL transmits with 5,000 watts. At night, to protect other stations on 1300 AM from interference, it reduces power to 2,500 watts. WXRL uses a directional antenna with a four-tower array. Programming is also heard on 250-watt FM translator W238DD at 95.5 MHz.

== History ==
The station signed on in 1965, as WMMJ. It had been founded by Stan Jasinski, a local media personality known mostly for his polka broadcasts. Polka has been a fixture of the station's format since its inception. When Jasinski shifted his focus to television and started up Channel 29 WUTV in 1970, he sold the radio station to Ramblin' Lou Schriver, who owned the station for the rest of his life and installed what was then the first country music station in Western New York.

When more modern FM country stations such as WYRK and WNUC started reaching the airwaves in the early 1990s, Schriver, like numerous other AM country stations, maintained a classic country format. Schriver died January 17, 2016, from heart failure at age 86. His family and heirs continue to own and operate the station.

As of October 23, 2018, after a long application process with the FCC, WXRL added an FM translator at 95.5 MHz. The station's format did not change with the addition of the new translator. In 2020, WXRL became the last commercial radio station in the Buffalo area to begin streaming its programming on the Internet.

== Programs ==
Local hosts include Craig Matthews, "RC," Lynn Carol Schriver and Lou Five. Scott Cleveland was a longtime on-air personality with the station until his death in 2015. Ramblin' Lou Schriver's reruns of "The Old Country Church" continue to be posthumously broadcast on the station. The station has a "Drive Time Polkas" show from 5 till 7 pm Monday thru Saturday, hosted by Ron Dombrowski (who also hosts polka shows for WECK and WBBZ-TV), and also devotes a large portion of its weekend programming to polka music.

Syndicated programs include the Renfro Valley Gatherin', Rick Jackson's Country Classics, Pure American Country, and The Jimmy Sturr Show. AP Radio provides the station's news updates.

The station also airs some local sports programming, predominantly from Lancaster High School.

WXRL carries only a small amount of external advertising, with most of its commercial spots advertising appearances by the Ramblin' Lou Family Band and "Ramblin' Lou Tours" (bus trips sold and promoted by the Schriver family to locations mostly in the eastern United States). Milk for Health, a promotional organization representing Western New York's dairy farmers, has sponsored WXRL for its entire existence, a sponsorship deal that dates to before Schriver launched the station; Milk for Health had previously sponsored the Ramblin' Lou show on WWOL.
