= WBBF =

- Buffalo, New York; United States
- Broadcast area: Buffalo–Niagara Falls metropolitan area
- Frequency: 1120 kHz
- Branding: ESPN Buffalo AM1120 & 98.9 FM

Programming
- Language: English
- Format: Sports talk
- Affiliations: ESPN Radio; Buffalo Bills Radio Network

Ownership
- Owner: Cumulus Media; (Radio License Holding CBC, LLC)
- Sister stations: WEDG; WGRF; WHTT-FM

History
- First air date: September 1947
- Former call signs: WWOL (1947–1986); WHTT (1986–1987); WTKS (1987–1988); WHTT (1988–1999); WMNY (1999–2005)
- Call sign meaning: Buffalo Buffalo

Technical information
- Licensing authority: FCC
- Facility ID: 53967
- Class: D
- Power: 1,000 watts days only
- Transmitter coordinates: 42°49′50.2″N 78°48′0.1″W
- Translator: 98.9 W255DH (Buffalo)

Links
- Public license information: Public file; LMS
- Webcast: Listen live
- Website: www.sportsradiobuffalo.com

WBBF (1120 kHz, "ESPN Buffalo") is a commercial AM radio station in Buffalo, New York, airing a sports talk format. It is owned by Cumulus Media and de facto operated by Good Karma Sports as a full-time affiliate of ESPN Radio and the Buffalo Bills Radio Network. The studios are based at One Bills Drive in Orchard Park and the offices are at James E. Casey Drive in Buffalo.

WBBF broadcasts with a power of 1,000 watts as a daytimer. Its transmitter is on Dorrance Avenue at Onondaga Avenue in West Seneca, New York. Because AM 1120 is reserved for Class A, clear channel station KMOX in St. Louis, WBBF must leave the air at night to avoid interference. WBBF programming is heard full-time through FM translator W255DH (98.9).

== History ==
=== WWOL, WHTT, WMNY ===
The station signed on the air in September 1947, as WWOL. In 1954, its FM counterpart WWOL-FM (now WHTT-FM) signed on, simulcasting WWOL. It unsuccessfully applied for a television license in 1957. In the 1970s, WWOL-AM-FM aired a country music format, later switching to oldies as WHTT and WHTT-FM.

In the 1990s, WHTT (AM) broke away from its simulcast with WHTT-FM, as the AM station was sold to Mercury Communications and changed its format to a brokered programming business format. It began using the call sign WMNY, which represented the owners Mercury Communications and the state of New York, but with a play on the "money" the program producers paid to be on the station.

=== Switch to WBBF ===
The WBBF call letters were used on several radio stations in nearby Rochester for over fifty years, including stations now known as WROC, WBZA and most recently, WFKL, which dropped the call sign in early 2005. Then-WMNY picked up the WBBF calls shortly thereafter.

The station had been a part of the Totally Gospel Radio Network from September 1996 until December 2006. The network moved to a stronger 24-hour signal in Western New York on sister station WHLD as well as other stations across the U.S., including FM station WFWO in 2010.

=== Spanish-language Christian ===
In 2007, a Spanish-language Christian music and talk station was launched by Totally Gospel Radio Network. All of the Spanish-language programming on WBBF which was initially produced by the Totally Gospel Radio Network was sold to Assemblia Iglesia, a local Hispanic ministry headed by Pastor Sam Rivera.

When Cumulus Media switched WHLD from adult standards to CBS Sports Radio early in 2013, the company planned to move the former WHLD format to WBBF, but people in the Spanish speaking community wrote to Cumulus about the station's value to Western New York Latinos. The ministry's programming remained.

The original Totally Gospel Radio Network format returned to the airwaves on WBBF in January 2016, during drive times, along with a blend of urban contemporary gospel and Hispanic Christian programming throughout the week. Totally Gospel Network returned as the primary format on WBBF as of September 2017.

WBBF went silent on July 16, 2019, and resumed broadcasting December 20. For the following 14 months, the station resumed simulcasting WHTT-FM as temporary programming, identifying itself as WBBF only in station identification.

=== Classic hip hop ===
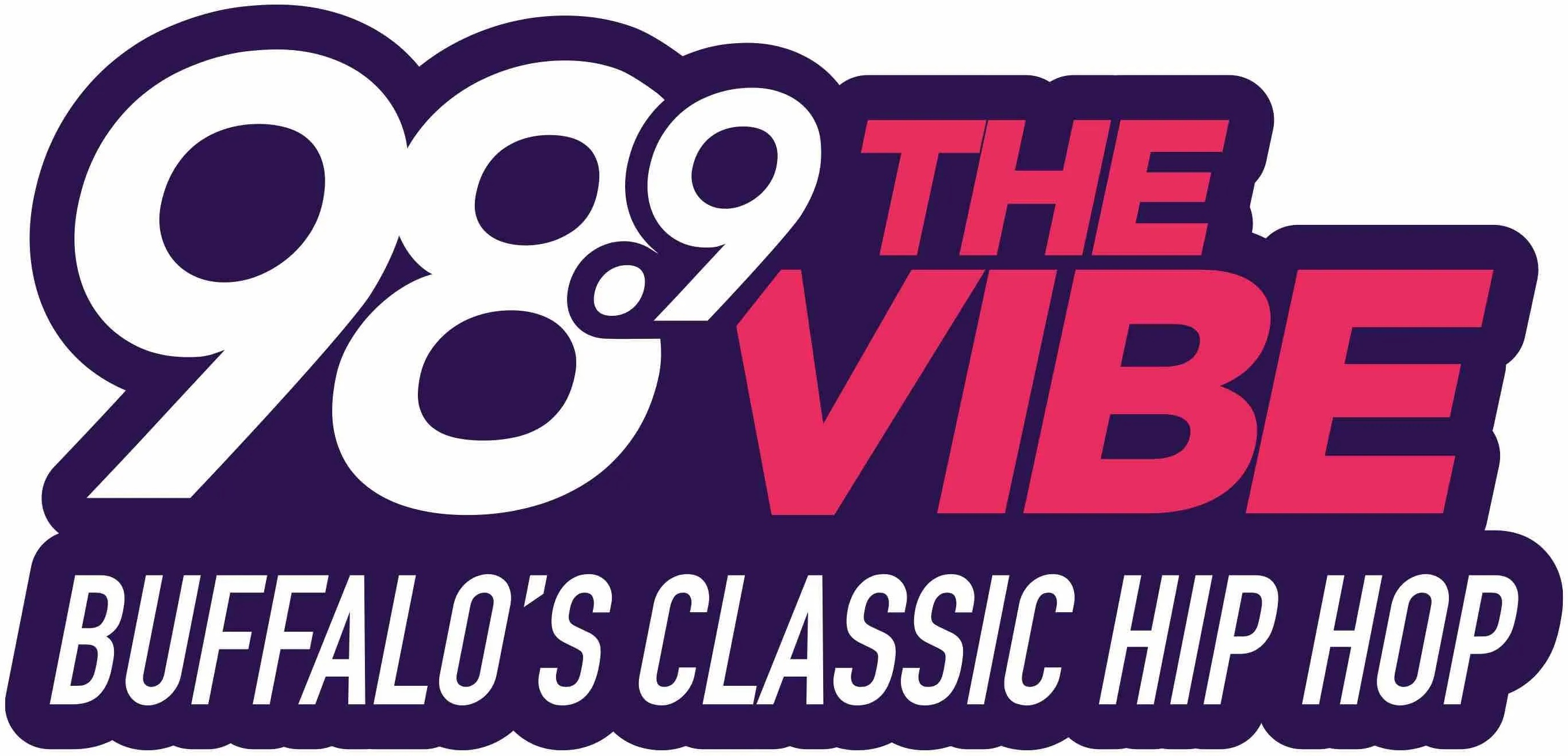
Previous logo

On February 27, 2021, WBBF dropped its simulcast with WHTT and flipped to classic hip-hop, branded as "98.9 The Vibe", with programming sourced from co-owned Westwood One. The 98.9 FM translator indirectly reunites the WBBF call letters with one of the frequencies it used during its time on Rochester radio.

WBBF was one of three Buffalo AM stations, along with WUFO and WWWS, offering programming for the Buffalo market's African-American community. WBBF, WUFO and WWWS have FM translators and use the FM dial position to identify themselves. They compete with full-power FM station WBLK, which has an urban contemporary format.

=== Top 40/CHR ===
Logo as Hot 98.9, used from 2023–2026

On July 14, 2023, at 6 p.m., WBBF switched to Top 40/CHR, branded as "Hot 98.9". The format flip was the closing domino in a series of format changes that had taken place in Buffalo over the previous month, most directly nearby WKSE on 98.5 (the market's previous heritage Top 40/CHR station) shifting to an adult lean following the sale of its own hot-AC sister station WTSS to a religious broadcaster in June.

=== Sports talk ===
On September 14, 2026 at midnight, after playing "Timber" by Pitbull, WBBF flipped to sports radio as "ESPN Buffalo". The move brought ESPN Radio programming back to the Buffalo market exactly five years after Audacy flipped WWKB to its "The Bet" network and provides an on-air home for Buffalo Bills Radio Network studio programming that would not fit on flagship station WGRF (both the Bills network and ESPN Radio are managed by Good Karma Sports).
