= List of people from Buffalo, New York =

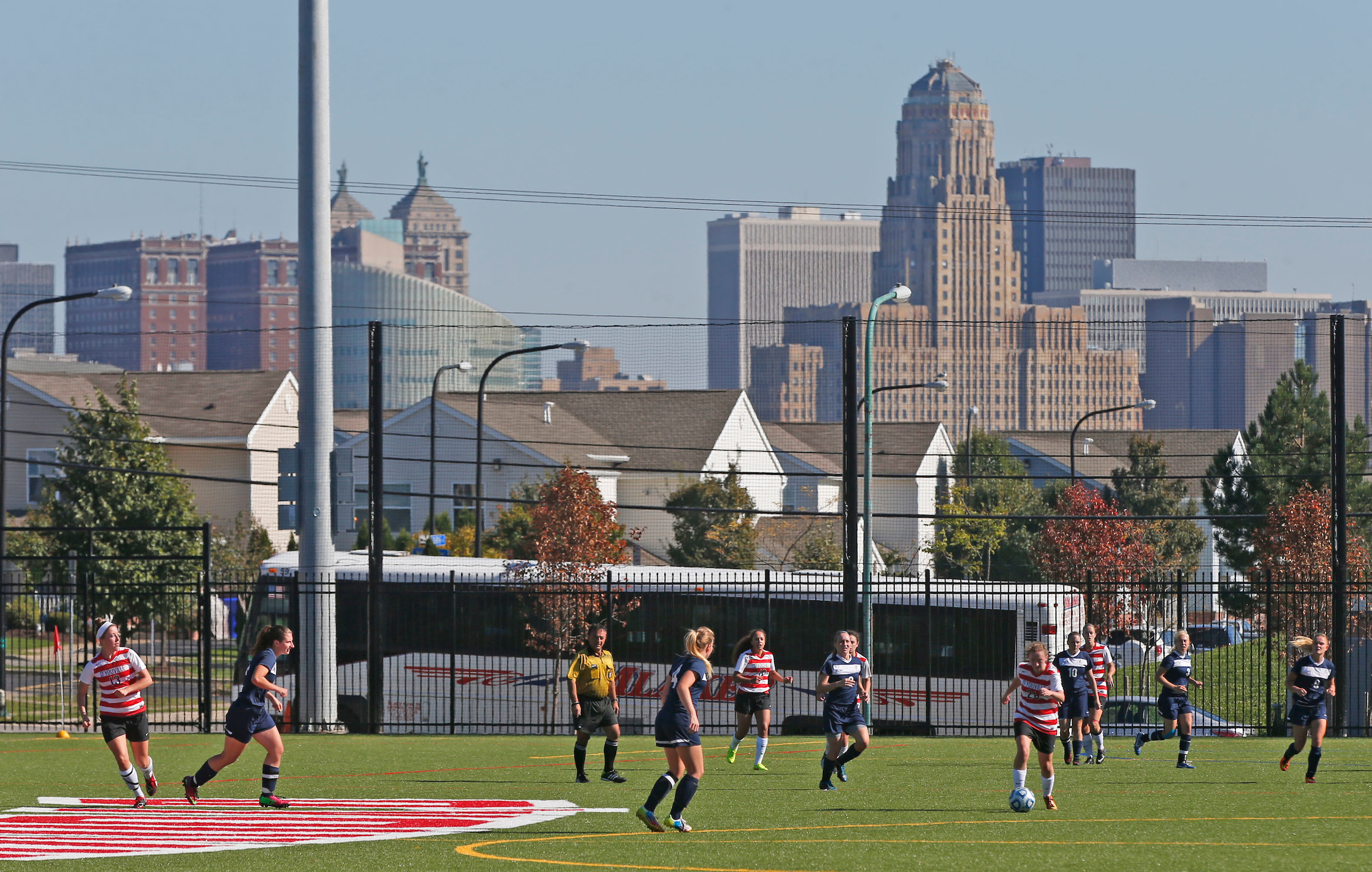
Downtown Buffalo

This is a list of people who are from or have lived in Buffalo, New York. Individuals are listed in alphabetical order by last name in each category. Residents of Buffalo are commonly referred to as Buffalonians.

== Architects ==
- Louise Blanchard Bethune (1856–1915)
- Gordon Bunshaft (1909–1990), Pritzker Prize winner
- Robert T. Coles (1929–2020)
- William H. Folsom (1815–1901), designed the Manti Temple
- E. B. Green (1855–1950)
- James A. Johnson (1865–1939)
- Duane Lyman (1886–1966)
- Richard A. Waite (1848–1911)

== Arts and humanities ==
- Cory Arcangel (born 1978), new media artist
- Timothy D. Bellavia (born 1971), children's author, illustrator, and educator
- Charles E. Burchfield (1893–1967), watercolor painter
- Philip Burke (born 1956), caricaturist
- Hanson Carroll (1928–2013), nature and sports photographer
- Charles Clough (born 1951), painter
- Tony Conrad (1940–2016), media artist
- Steve Fiorilla (1961–2009), illustrator and sculptor
- Frank Kelly Freas (1922–2005), science fiction and fantasy artist
- Wilhelmina McAlpin Godfrey (1914–1994), painter, printmaker, and fiber artist
- Grace Knowlton (1932–2020), sculptor
- Justine Kurland (born 1969), photographer
- J. J. Lankes (1884–1960), illustrator, woodcut print artist, and author
- Sylvia Lark (1947–1990), Seneca painter and printmaker
- Robert Longo (born 1953), painter and sculptor
- Anne-Imelda Radice (born 1948), art historian and curator
- Asad Raza (born 1974), artist
- Spain Rodriguez (1940–2012), underground cartoonist
- Milton Rogovin (1909–2011), documentary photographer
- Charles Rohlfs (1853–1936), actor, patternmaker, stove designer, and furniture maker
- Michael Ross (1955), artist
- Bob Sarles (1957), documentary filmmaker, film editor, and radio host
- Paul Sharits (1943–1993), visual artist
- Cindy Sherman (born 1954), artist and photographer
- William Simpson (c.1818–1872), portrait artist
- Tony Sisti (1901–1983), painter
- Eugene Speicher (1883–1962), portrait, landscape, and figurative painter
- Chrysanne Stathacos (born 1951), print, textile, performance, and conceptual artist
- Tom Toles (born 1951), political cartoonist
- George Wilson (1921–1998), comic book artist
- Adam Zyglis (born 1982), editorial cartoonist

== Authors and journalists ==
- John Arcudi, comic book author
- John Barth, novelist
- Gary Barwin, Irish writer
- Charles Baxter, author
- Lauren Belfer, author
- Wolf Blitzer, television journalist
- Lawrence Block, crime novelist
- Howard Bloom, publicist
- Dale Brown, aviator and author
- William Wells Brown, abolitionist and writer
- Taylor Caldwell, author
- Lucille Clifton, poet
- J. M. Coetzee, South African writer
- Burton Crane, financial journalist
- Robert Creeley, poet
- Barbara Culliton, science journalist and editor
- Marian de Forest, journalist and playwright
- Gregg Easterbrook, magazine journalist
- Marvin Farber, philosopher
- Leslie Feinberg, author and activist
- Leslie Fiedler, literary critic
- F. Scott Fitzgerald, novelist
- Josh Fruhlinger, creator of The Comics Curmudgeon
- Dawn Gallagher, author, beauty, and wellness expert
- Alice Gerard, journalist and peace activist
- Frances Gillmor, folklorist, scholar, and novelist
- Loss Pequeño Glazier, poet and director of the Electronic Poetry Center
- Anna Katharine Green, poet and novelist
- Terry Gross, radio personality
- A. R. Gurney, playwright
- Richard Hofstadter, historian
- Rich Hogan, screenwriter
- Karla F. C. Holloway, professor
- Paul Horgan, historian and author
- Elbert Hubbard, publisher
- Bruce Jackson, scholar
- John Kessel, sci-fi writer
- Nancy Kress, sci-fi writer
- Alex Levy, media strategist, speechwriter, and theater producer
- Mabel Dodge Luhan, patron of the arts
- Martha MacCallum, television journalist
- Norman E. Mack, editor and publisher of the Buffalo Times; chairman of the Democratic National Committee
- Steele MacKaye, playwright and theatrical producer
- Marguerite Merington, author
- Marion Juliet Mitchell, poet
- Joyce Carol Oates, author
- John Otto, radio talk show host
- Laura Pedersen, journalist, novelist, and playwright
- Tim Powers, sci-fi writer
- Ishmael Reed, poet and essayist
- Emma May Alexander Reinertsen, writer and social reformer
- Tim Russert, television journalist
- Joseph Sansonese, author
- Ruben Santiago-Hudson, playwright and actor
- Bob Smith, comedian and author
- Fran Striker, creator of the Lone Ranger and the Green Hornet
- Matt Taibbi, journalist
- Doug Turner, executive editor of the Courier Express, Washington Bureau Chief of the Buffalo News, and Olympic rower
- William W. Turner, writer and FBI agent.
- Mark Twain, pen name of Samuel Langhorne Clemens and iconic author
- Jane Meade Welch, journalist and lecturer
- Stuart Cary Welch, author and curator of Indian and Islamic art
- Lanford Wilson, playwright
- Bob Wojnowski, sports journalist
- Julia Evelyn Ditto Young, writer

== Bands, composers, and musicians ==
- Laura Aikin, operatic coloratura soprano
- Michael Angelakos, singer, songwriter, and producer
- Harold Arlen, prolific composer of popular music who won an Academy Award for "Over the Rainbow"
- Darrell Banks, singer
- Benny the Butcher, rapper and songwriter
- The Bloody Hollies, band
- Juini Booth, jazz double-bassist
- Buffalo Bills, barbershop quartet
- Buffalo Philharmonic Orchestra, classical orchestral symphony
- The Bunny The Bear, band
- Julie Byrne, singer-songwriter
- Armani Caesar, rapper
- Tommy Calandra, guitarist, songwriter, and record producer
- Cannibal Corpse, band
- Peter Case, singer-songwriter and guitarist
- Ray Chamberlain, jazz guitarist and bassist
- Johny Chow, musician and bassist for Stone Sour
- Stacy Clark, singer-songwriter
- Willis Conover, jazz producer and broadcaster
- Conway the Machine, rapper and songwriter
- Patrick Cowley, composer and recording artist
- Cute is What We Aim For, band
- Vic Dana, dancer and singer
- Danimal Cannon, video game composer and performer
- Daringer, record producer
- Lance Diamond, lounge singer and personality
- Ani DiFranco, singer, guitarist, multi-instrumentalist, poet, and songwriter
- Julius Eastman, composer, pianist, and singer
- Every Time I Die, band
- JoAnn Falletta, classical musician and orchestral conductor
- Florian-Ayala Fauna, noise musician and music producer
- Morton Feldman, composer
- Joe Ford, jazz saxophonist
- Lukas Foss, composer, pianist, and conductor
- Jackson C. Frank, folk musician
- Charles Gayle, jazz saxophonist, pianist, bass clarinetist, and bassist
- Teddy Geiger, singer-songwriter
- Girlpope, band
- E. Ray Goetz, Broadway composer and producer
- Goo Goo Dolls, band
- Grabbitz, singer-songwriter
- Green Jellÿ, band
- Jim Hall, jazz guitarist, composer, and arranger
- Alan Heatherington, orchestra conductor
- Ray Henderson, songwriter
- Edna Indermaur, classical singer
- It Dies Today, band
- Jackdaw, band
- Rick James, singer-songwriter, musician, and record producer
- Joe Public, band
- Joe Kraemer, composer
- Jordan Kyle, producer, songwriter, and engineer
- Lemuria, band
- Mel Lewis, drummer, jazz musician, and bandleader
- John Lombardo, musician and founding member of 10,000 Maniacs and John & Mary
- David Lucas, composer
- Gary Mallaber, drummer, percussionist, and singer
- Nicholas Mason, drummer
- Brian McKnight, singer, songwriter, actor, record producer, radio host, and multi-instrumentalist
- Don Menza, saxophonist, arranger, composer, session musician, and jazz educator
- Mercury Rev, band
- Bobby Militello, jazz saxophonist and flautist
- The Modernaires, 1940s vocal harmony group
- Moe, band
- Nina Morgana, soprano with the Metropolitan Opera
- Gurf Morlix, vocalist, songwriter, and record producer
- NicePeter, comedian, musician, and personality
- Willie Nile, singer-songwriter
- Che Noir, rapper and record producer
- Sam Noto, jazz trumpeter
- Ookla the Mok, band
- Tina Parol, singer-songwriter
- Leonard Pennario, pianist and songwriter
- Pentimento, band
- Lucky Peterson, blues guitarist and keyboardist
- Kristen Pfaff, musician and bassist for Hole
- Anna Ware Poole, composer, pianist, teacher, and vocalist
- Mary Ramsey, musician and founding member of 10,000 Maniacs and John & Mary
- The Reign of Kindo, band
- The Road, late 60s early 70s rock Band
- John Rzeznik, musician and founding member of the Goo Goo Dolls
- Scary Chicken, band
- Marc Scibilia, singer-songwriter
- Billy Sheehan, bassist
- Paul Siebel, singer-songwriter
- Harry B. Smith, writer, lyricist, and composer
- Dr. Lonnie Smith, jazz organist
- Snapcase, band
- Joanie Sommers, singer concentrating on jazz, standards, and pop
- Alexis Spight, gospel musician
- Spyro Gyra, jazz band
- STEMM, band
- April Stevens, singer
- John Stevens, classic pop singer
- Stevie J., musician, record producer, songwriter, and television personality
- Elizabeth Swados, writer, composer, musician, and theatre director
- Stan Szelest, musician
- Talas, 1970s-80s rock band
- Nino Tempo, singer
- Until I Wake, post-hardcore band
- John Valby, musician and comedian
- Grover Washington, Jr., jazz-funk and soul-jazz saxophonist
- Cory Wells, singer of Three Dog Night
- Westside Gunn, rapper
- Patrick Wilson, musician and founding member of Weezer
- Andy Williams, musician and rhythm guitarist of Every Time I Die; professional wrestler
- Jack Yellen, lyricist and screenwriter
- Z. Mann Zilla, rapper

== Business and industry ==
- John J. Boland, co-founder of the American Steamship Company and Boland and Cornelius Company
- Robert Borthwick Adam, co-founder of Adam, Meldrum & Whiting
- Joseph Dart, lawyer, businessman, and entrepreneur; creator of Dart's Elevator
- William H. Donaldson, chairman of the U.S. Securities and Exchange Commission; Under Secretary of State for International Security Affairs; chairman and CEO of the New York Stock Exchange; and chairman, president, and CEO of Aetna
- Joseph Ellicott, surveyor, city planner, land office agent, lawyer, and politician
- William G. Fargo, co-founder of American Express Company and Wells Fargo
- Anson Goodyear, president of the Great Southern Lumber Company
- Charles W. Goodyear, co-founder of the Buffalo and Susquehanna Railroad, Great Southern Lumber Company, Goodyear Lumber Company, Buffalo & Susquehanna Coal & Coke Company, and the New Orleans Great Northern Railroad Company
- Wilson Greatbatch, engineer and inventor who held more than 325 patents
- Arthur Hayes, co-founder and former CEO of cryptocurrency exchange BitMEX
- George A. Hormel, founder of Hormel Foods Corporation
- Jeremy Jacobs, chairman of Delaware North and owner of the Boston Bruins
- Sidney Janis, writer, art dealer, and collector; founder of Sidney Janis Gallery
- John J. Kennedy, businessman and politician; New York State Treasurer, 1911–1914
- Seymour H. Knox I, founder of the F. W. Woolworth Company
- Seymour H. Knox II, chairman of the F. W. Woolworth Company
- John D. Larkin, founder of the Larkin Company and Buffalo Pottery
- Jon L. Luther, chairman and CEO of Dunkin' Brands; chairman of Arby's Restaurant Group
- Sherman J. Maisel, economist who served on the Board of Governors of the Federal Reserve System
- Darwin D. Martin, businessman best known for the house he commissioned from Frank Lloyd Wright
- Gerald C. Meyers, chairman and CEO of American Motors Corporation, 1977–1982
- John R. Oishei, co-founder of Tri-Continental Corporation
- Ralph Peo, founder of Frontier Industries; chairman and CEO of Houdaille Industries
- Pat Powers, film producer associated with Walt Disney
- Robert E. Rich Sr., food processing pioneer and founder of Rich Products
- Cindy Rose, CEO of WPP
- Chris Sacca, billionaire venture investor; founder of Lowercase Capital
- Grace Carew Sheldon, journalist, author, editor, and businesswoman
- Ellsworth Milton Statler, founder of Statler Hotels
- Henry Wells, co-founder of American Express Company and Wells Fargo
- John G. Wickser, president of the Buffalo German Insurance Company and the Buffalo Commercial Insurance Company
- Robert G. Wilmers, former chairman and CEO of M&T Bank

== Entertainers and actors ==
- Stephanie Allynne, actress
- Jacob Artist, actor
- Nick Bakay, voice actor
- Suzan Ball, actress
- Christine Baranski, actress
- Michael Bennett, choreographer and director
- Amanda Blake, actress
- John Wayne Bobbit, actor
- Sorrell Booke, actor
- David Boreanaz, actor
- Kyle Chandler, actor
- Katharine Cornell, actress
- William Courtleigh, Jr., silent-film actor
- Don Criqui, sportscaster
- Andrew Dan-Jumbo, television personality
- Jeffrey DeMunn, actor
- Diane English, television producer
- Agnes Ethel, 19th-century actress
- Jeff Fahey, actor
- Gary Farmer, actor
- William Fichtner, actor
- Tom Fontana, screenwriter and producer
- Vincent Gallo, actor and director
- Nyakim Gatwech, model
- David Hampton, impostor who posed as Sidney Poitier's son in 1983, which inspired the play and film Six Degrees of Separation
- Mark Hapka, actor known for Days of Our Lives
- Patrick Hasburgh, writer producer
- Richard Hy, YouTuber known as Angry Cops and Special Victims Unit detective for the BPD
- Marc Evan Jackson, actor
- Gloria Jean, actress
- Beverly Johnson, model
- Jeffrey Jones, actor
- Keemstar, YouTuber whose real name Daniel Keem
- Rachael Lillis, voice actress
- Wendie Malick, actress
- Nancy Marchand, actress
- Jesse L. Martin, actor
- Bill Mazer, sportscaster
- Brian McKnight, singer and actor
- Kristen McMenamy, fashion model
- Don Messick, voice actor
- David Milch, screenwriter and producer
- Greg Mullavy, actor
- Chad Michael Murray, model and actor
- Louis Mustillo, actor
- Chelsea Noble, actress
- Joe Pera, comedian
- Suzie Plakson, actress, singer, writer, and artist
- John T. Raymond, stage actor
- James Read, actor
- Joey Reynolds, radio personality
- Irene Rich, actress
- Mark Russell, satirist
- John Rzeznik, musician, singer, song writer with the GooGoo Dolls
- Talia Ryder, actress
- William Sadler, actor
- John Schuck, actor
- Dick Shawn, actor
- Buffalo Bob Smith, star of Howdy Doody
- Carrie Stevens, actress
- Vola Vale, actress
- A.J. Verel, actor and stunt coordinator
- Paul C. Vogt, comedian
- Peter Allen Vogt, comedian
- Jessica White, model
- James Whitmore, actor

== Military ==
- Danelle Barrett (born July 20, 1967), retired U.S. Navy rear admiral
- John Basilone (1916–1945), Medal of Honor recipient
- John P. Bobo (1943–1967), Medal of Honor recipient
- Ronald C. Brock (1895–1984), adjutant general of New York
- Thomas Crotty (1912–1942), only Coast Guardsman to be captured as POW during World War II
- John W. Cudmore (1938–2023), surgeon and U.S. Army major general
- Charles N. DeGlopper (1921–1944), second World War recipient of Medal of Honor
- Harold John Ellison (1917–1942), Navy Cross recipient
- Herbert O. Fisher (1909–1990), chief test pilot for Curtiss-Wright
- Frank Gaffney (1883–1948), Medal of Honor recipient
- David Goggins (born 1975), Navy SEAL
- Anson Goodyear (1877–1964), major general in the New York Guard
- Karl F. Hausauer (1896–1979), adjutant general of New York
- Simeon T. Josselyn (1842–1905), Medal of Honor recipient
- Benjamin Kaufman (1894–1981), Medal of Honor recipient
- C. Wade McClusky (1902–1976), United States Navy aviator
- Harold C. Roberts (1898–1945), colonel in the United States Marine Corps; recipient of three Navy Crosses
- William B. Rochester (1826–1909), paymaster-general of the United States Army
- Adrian R. Root (1832–1899), Union brevet major general
- John C. Sagelhurst (1841–1907), Civil War recipient of Medal of Honor
- John L. Tiernon (1841–1910), U.S. Army brigadier general
- Frederick E. Toy (1866–1933), Medal of Honor recipient, orderly to Theodore Roosevelt
- Matt Urban (1919–1995), Medal of Honor recipient

== Politics and law ==
- Neil Abercrombie, governor of Hawaii and congressman
- Shirley Chisholm, congresswoman and presidential candidate
- Frances Folsom Cleveland, First Lady of the United States
- Grover Cleveland, 22nd and 24th president of the United States
- William J. Donovan, Medal of Honor recipient and regarded as the founding father of the CIA
- William Dorsheimer, U.S. attorney, lieutenant governor, and congressman
- Frank H. Easterbrook, judge
- Arthur O. Eve, state representative, activist, observer during Attica Prison Rebellion of 1971
- Abigail Fillmore, First Lady of the United States
- Caroline Fillmore, second wife of Millard Fillmore
- Millard Fillmore, 13th president of the United States
- Manly Fleischmann, production administrator during the Korean War and chairman of NY Gov. Nelson Rockefeller's Commission on Financing Public Education (the "Fleischmann Commission")
- James D. Griffin, mayor of Buffalo 1978–93
- Mark Grisanti, state senator
- Isaac R. Harrington, mayor of Buffalo
- Brian Higgins, U.S. representative for New York
- Kathy Hochul, 57th governor of New York
- Edwin Jaeckle, New York State Republican Party chairman
- Jack Kemp, secretary of U.S. Department of Housing and Urban Development, football player, congressman, vice-presidential candidate
- Tim Kennedy, U.S. representative for New York
- John J. LaFalce, U.S. representative
- Frank J. Loesch, lawyer and organizer of Chicago Crime Commission
- Donald Cyril Lubick, attorney and tax policy expert
- Frank C. Ludera, indicted for an offence while he served in the Erie County Legislature 1968–1971
- Salvatore R. Martoche, former U.S. attorney, appellate court judge, and assistant secretary of labor
- Thomas McCarty, Wisconsin politician
- Mohamed Abdullahi Mohamed, president of Somalia
- Henry J. Nowak, U.S. representative
- Ajit Pai, FCC chairman
- Carl Paladino, businessman and founder of the Taxpayers Party of New York
- Ely S. Parker, commissioner of Indian Affairs under Ulysses S. Grant
- Tom Perez, senior advisor to the president of the United States and director of the White House Office of Intergovernmental Affairs (2023–present), chair of the Democratic National Committee (2017–2021), United States secretary of labor (2013–2017), and United States assistant attorney general for civil rights (2009–2013)
- Peter Buell Porter, U.S. secretary of war 1828–29
- John Roberts, 17th chief justice of United States
- Christopher Scanlon, mayor of Buffalo
- Winifred C. Stanley, first person to introduce equal pay legislation in United States
- Angela Stanton-King, Georgia congressional candidate
- Peter J. Tropman, Wisconsin politician
- Col. John B. Weber, congressman

== Religion, charities, social advocacy ==
- Marty Angelo, minister, author, television producer, record promoter, disk jockey, restaurant/nightclub owner, and band manager
- Nelson Baker, Roman Catholic priest and church administrator
- Rosalie Bertell, scientist, author, environmental activist, and epidemiologist
- William Wells Brown, abolitionist, Underground Railroad conductor, activist, author. Has historic sign marker in Canalside, noting his role in transporting across the river Freedom Seekers to Ontario, Canada
- Molly Burhans, environmentalist, cartographer, UN Young Champion of the Earth
- Henry Livingston Elmendorf and Theresa Elemendorf, librarians and married couple
- Harry Emerson Fosdick, pastor and central figure in the "Fundamentalist–Modernist Controversy" within American Protestantism
- Kevin Gaughan, attorney and government reform advocate
- Anson Goodyear, philanthropist and first president of the Museum of Modern Art in New York City
- Katharine Martha Houghton Hepburn, suffragist and birth control advocate
- Isaac Klein, prominent rabbi and halakhic authority within Conservative Judaism
- Sister Karen Klimczak, member of the Sisters of St. Joseph
- Lillian G. Kohlhamer, suffragist and peace activist
- Maggie Kuhn, founder of the Gray Panthers movement
- Henry Moxley, businessman, religious leader, and activist
- Marvin Opler, anthropologist and social psychiatrist
- Morris Opler, anthropologist and advocate of Japanese American civil rights
- Red Jacket, Native American Seneca orator and chief of the Wolf clan
- Margit Slachta, founder of the Sisters of Social Service
- Martin Sostre, jailhouse lawyer and prisoner’s rights activist, Amnesty International prisoner of conscience, Afro-Asia bookshop owner
- Stanley Spisiak, "Mr Buffalo River", conservationist and environmental activist
- Mary Burnett Talbert, African-American activist, suffragist, and reformer

== Science and technology ==
- Willis Carrier, inventor of modern air conditioning
- Donald Ewart, electrical engineer
- Sidney Farber, considered the father of modern chemotherapy
- Genevieve Grotjan Feinstein, mathematician and cryptanalyst who helped crack the Japanese cipher machine during WWII
- Edward Gibson, NASA astronaut, pilot, engineer, and physicist
- Wilson Greatbatch, inventor of the Cardiac pacemaker
- Herbert Hauptman, Nobel laureate
- Herman Hollerith, founder of the Tabulating Machine Company, which later became IBM
- Bruce Kershner, environmentalist and author
- Chad Myers, meteorologist
- Roswell Park, physician
- James Pawelczyk, NASA researcher
- Alfred Southwick, inventor of the electric chair
- Sargur N. Srihari, computer scientist
- Cliff Stoll, astronomer, author, and teacher
- Craig Venter, founder of Celera Genomics, The Institute for Genomic Research, and the J. Craig Venter Institute
- Jeffrey Wigand, tobacco industry whistleblower

== Sports ==
- Kevyn Adams, hockey player and former general manager of the Buffalo Sabres
- Adrian Adonis, wrestler
- Anita Alvarez, Olympic synchronized swimmer
- Matt Anderson, volleyball player
- Jimmy Arias, tennis player
- Justin Bailey, ice hockey player
- Tom Baker, bowler
- Dick Beyer, wrestler
- The Blade, wrestler
- Ed Book, basketball player
- Gary Boughton, soccer player
- Damone Brown, basketball player
- Derick Brownell, soccer player
- Jack Brownschidle, hockey player
- Jim Burt, football player
- Al Cervi, basketball player and coach
- Steven Coppola, Olympic rower
- Jon Corto, football player
- Don Curtis, wrestler
- Jim Dombrowski, football player
- John Ducey, baseball executive and umpire
- Brian Dux, basketball player
- Joe Ehrmann, football player
- Rashad Evans, mixed martial artist
- Jeffrey Float, Olympic swimmer
- Jonny Flynn, basketball player
- Marcus Foligno, hockey player
- Nick Foligno, hockey player
- Daniel Garcia, wrestler
- Dennis Gilbert, hockey player
- David Goggins, ultramarathon runner
- Corey Graham, football player
- Rob Gronkowski, football player
- Paul Harris, basketball player
- Lazar Hayward, basketball player
- Orel Hershiser, baseball player
- Joe Hesketh, baseball player
- Dave Hollins, baseball player
- Bill Hunter, baseball player
- Andy Jankowiak, racing driver
- Ron Jaworski, football player
- Josh Johnson, baseball player
- Patrick Kaleta, hockey player
- Patrick Kane, hockey player
- Chad Kelly, football player and nephew of Jim
- Jim Kelly, football player who settled in Buffalo after playing for the Buffalo Bills
- Jack Kemp, football player and politician
- Tim Kennedy, hockey player
- Seymour H. Knox III, NHL owner
- Todd Krygier, hockey player
- Christian Laettner, basketball player
- Mike Lalor, hockey player and Stanley Cup winner in 1986
- Bob Lanier, basketball player
- Mark Lewin, wrestler
- Cora Livingston, wrestler and first women's world champion
- Lex Luger, wrestler
- Sal Maglie, baseball player
- Don Majkowski, football player
- Tom Makowski, baseball player
- Mike Mamula, football player
- Carol Mann, golfer
- Todd Marchant, hockey player
- Phil McConkey, football player
- Steven Means, football player
- Marc Mero, wrestler
- Joe Mesi, boxer
- Steve Mesler, Olympic bobsled gold medalist
- Aaron Miller, hockey player
- Matvey Natanzon, backgammon player
- Paul Noworyta, vert skater
- Jordan Nwora, basketball player
- Greg Oden, basketball player
- Brooks Orpik, hockey player
- Adam Page, sledge hockey player
- Tommy Paul, boxer
- Beth Phoenix, wrestler
- Ron Pitts, football player
- Kevin Quick, hockey player
- Emily Regan, Olympic rowing gold medalist
- Clifford Robinson, basketball player
- Otto Roehm, Olympic freestyle wrestler
- Naaman Roosevelt, football player
- Buddy Rosar, baseball player
- Trevor Ruffin, basketball player
- Roy Saari, Olympic swimmer
- Alexi Salamone, sled hockey player
- Abdi Salim, soccer player
- Philippe Sauvé, hockey player
- Hayley Scamurra, hockey player
- Peter Scamurra, hockey player
- Cole Schneider, hockey player
- The Silent Warrior, wrestler
- Michael Sisti, hockey coach
- Jimmy Slattery, boxer
- Warren Spahn, baseball pitcher
- James Starks, football player
- Lee Stempniak, hockey player
- Loren Stokes, basketball player
- Josh Thomas, football player
- A.J. Verel, kickboxer, martial artist
- Dominick Welch, basketball player
- Ward Wettlaufer, golfer
- Mikey Whipwreck, wrestler
- John Wildhack, Syracuse University athletic director
- Jesse Winker, baseball player
- Mary Wittenberg, marathon official
- Craig Wolfley, football player
- Ron Wolfley, football player and radio personality
- Miles Wood, hockey player
- John Wyatt, Negro league baseball player

== Other ==
- Joseph Christopher (1955–1993), serial killer
- Sly Green, drug trafficker and gangster

== See also ==
- List of mayors of Buffalo, New York
