= Lubick =

Lubick is a surname. Notable people with the surname include:

- Donald Cyril Lubick (1926-2022), American lawyer
- Marc Lubick (born 1977), American football coach
- Matt Lubick (born 1972), American football coach
- Sonny Lubick (born 1937), former American football coach
