= List of ship commissionings in 1985 =

The list of ship commissionings in 1985 includes a chronological list of all ships commissioned in 1985.

Date	Operator	Ship	Pennant	Class and type	Notes
January 19	United States Navy	Augusta	SSN-710	Los Angeles-class submarine	
February 8	Royal Navy of Oman	Nasr al Bahr	L2	Amphibious warfare ship	
February 9	United States Navy	Hawes	FFG-53	Oliver Hazard Perry-class frigate	
February 9	United States Navy	Whidbey Island	LSD-41	Whidbey Island-class dock landing ship	
February 14	United States Navy	2nd Lt. John P. Bobo	T-AK-3008	2nd Lt. John P. Bobo class dry cargo ship	Lead ship of her class
April 1	French Navy	Inflexible	S615	Redoutable-class submarine	
May 15	Royal Netherlands Navy	Makkum	M856	Alkmaar-class minehunter	
May 18	United States Navy	Elrod	FFG-55	Oliver Hazard Perry-class frigate	
May 25	United States Navy	Alabama	SSBN-731	Ohio-class submarine	
June 3	United States Navy	Vincennes	CG-49	Ticonderoga-class cruiser	
June 29	United States Navy	Ford	FFG-54	Oliver Hazard Perry-class frigate	
July 6	United States Navy	Honolulu	SSN-718	Los Angeles-class submarine	
July 27	United States Navy	Carr	FFG-52	Oliver Hazard Perry-class frigate	
July 27	United States Navy	Providence	SSN-719	Los Angeles-class submarine	
September 11	Royal Navy	Gloucester	D96	Type 42 destroyer	
September 11	Italian Navy	Giuseppe Garibaldi	551	Light aircraft carrier	
September 21	United States Navy	Simpson	FFG-56	Oliver Hazard Perry-class frigate	
October 5	Royal Navy	Tireless	S88	Trafalgar-class submarine	
November 1	Royal Navy	Ark Royal	R07	Invincible-class aircraft carrier	
November 9	United States Navy	Simpson	FFG-56	Oliver Hazard Perry-class frigate	
November 20	United States Navy	1st Lt. Baldomero Lopez	T-AK-3010	2nd Lt. John T. Bobo class dry cargo ship	under Military Sealift Command direction
November 23	United States Navy	Pittsburgh	SSN-720	Los Angeles-class submarine	
December 17	Royal Navy	Edinburgh	D97	Type 42 destroyer	
