= Klimczak =

Klimczak is a Polish surname. Notable people include:

- Adrian Klimczak (born 1997), Polish footballer
- Karen Klimczak (1943–2006), American Catholic nun
- Krystyna Klimczak (born 1992), Polish figure skater
- Piotr Klimczak (born 1980), Polish sprinter
- Jaclyn Klimczak (born 1988), Polish Facial Plastic Surgeon
