= Ward M. Hussey =

American lawyer

Ward MacLean Hussey (March 13, 1920 – November 16, 2009) drafted the principal part of the United States federal income tax laws, beginning before the enactment of the Internal Revenue Code of 1954.

Hussey received his undergraduate and law degrees from Harvard University, and a master's degree in political science from Columbia University. After serving in the U.S. Navy, he attended Japanese language school in Boulder, Colorado, and assisted with the establishment of military government on Okinawa during World War II.

Hussey spent 42 years in the Office of Legislative Counsel for the U.S. House of Representatives, beginning with his appointment in November 1946. He served as Legislative Counsel from 1972 until his retirement in 1989. He participated in the drafting of major legislation, including two versions of the Internal Revenue Code, the Marshall Plan, the Interstate Highway Act and Medicare. After retirement, he traveled extensively to assist emerging and developing countries in the drafting of tax law. He co-authored the book Basic World Tax Code and Commentary, with Donald C. Lubick. The book was translated into multiple languages.

On March 1, 1989, the 101st Congress passed a resolution honoring his service (H. Res. 97).
