= Office of the Legislative Counsel =

Agency assisting the United States House of Representatives

Agency overview
- Formed: 1918
- Jurisdiction: United States
- Agency executive: Warren Burke, Legislative Counsel
- Website: legcounsel.house.gov

The Office of the Legislative Counsel of the United States House of Representatives is a nonpartisan government organization which assists the House with the drafting and formatting of laws. The Office was first created as the Legislative Drafting Service in 1918 before being chartered as the Office of Legislative Counsel in 1970 via 2 U.S.C. § 281. The Legislative Counsel is appointed by the Speaker of the House.

The current Legislative Counsel, Warren Burke, was appointed by Speaker Mike Johnson in October 2024.

== History and purpose ==
The origins of the office lie in a research experiment between Columbia Law professor Middleton Beaman and the House of Representatives in 1916. The Committee on Ways and Means found Beaman's assistance in legislative drafting sufficiently helpful that they formalized the office two years later. The Office was originally established as the Legislative Drafting Service by the Revenue Act of 1918, charged to "aid in drafting public bills and resolutions or amendments thereto on the request of any committee of either House of Congress". From its creation, the officeholders were specified to be selected "without reference to political affiliations and solely on the ground of fitness to perform the duties of the office." The Office was renamed to the Office of the Legislative Counsel as part of the Revenue Act of 1924 (43 Stat. 353), to avoid confusion with the Legislative Reference Service.

The Office of the Legislative Counsel was chartered 50 years later by the Legislative Reorganization Act of 1970. Its purpose and policy is to:

advise and assist the House of Representatives, and its committees and Members, in the achievement of a clear, faithful, and coherent expression of legislative policies. The Office shall maintain impartiality as to issues of legislative policy to be determined by the House of Representatives, and shall not advocate the adoption or rejection of any legislation except when duly requested by the Speaker or a committee to comment on a proposal directly affecting the functions of the Office. The Office shall maintain the attorney-client relationship with respect to all communications between it and any Member or committee of the House.

In 2009, the House of Representatives agreed to a resolution expressing gratitude to the Office "for its more than 90 years of assistance in the drafting of legislation considered by the House."

As of 2020, the Office operates out of the Ford House Office Building and consists of 76 full-time employees, including 55 attorneys.

== List of Legislative Counsels ==
Since its establishment in 1918, the Office has seen eight Legislative Counsels:

1. Middleton Beaman (1919–1949)
2. Allan H. Perley (1949–1963)
3. Edward O. Craft (1963–1973)
4. Ward M. Hussey (1973–1989)
5. David E. Meade (1989–1999)
6. Pope Barrow (1999–2009)
7. Sandra Strokoff (2009–2017)
8. Ernest Wade Ballou Jr. (2017–2024)
9. Warren Burke (2024–present)
