= Girlpope =

US musical group

- Origin: Buffalo, New York, United States
- Genres: Power pop
- Years active: 1992–2004
- Label: Atom Smash Records
- Past members: Mark Norris, Richie Campagna, Brandon Delmont, Tommy Stanford
- Website: www.girlpope.com

Girlpope (1992–2004) were a rock band from Buffalo, New York. The power pop band included guitarist and vocalist Mark Norris, bassist and vocalist Richie Campagna, drummer Brandon Delmont, and guitarist and saxophonist Tommy Stanford.

== History ==
Girlpop was founded in Buffalo, New York in 1992 as a power pop trio. The band included guitarist and vocalist Mark Norris, bassist and vocalist Richie Campagna, drummer Brandom Delmont, and guitarist and saxophonist Tommy Stanford. In their first year, the Buffalo News named them Best Local Band. They also won the ninth annual WBNY Battle of the Bands.

Their first LP Cheeses of Nazareth was distributed nationally, and recognized as Best Local Album by the Buffalo Times. It opened for bands such as Cheap Trick, Everclear, Mercury Rev, and Shudder to Think. Twice the band performed at the International North by Northeast Festival in 1998, when they were a three-piece. They also played at the Friendship Festival in Ontario.

Vocalist Mark Norris won Original Male Vocalist at the 2001 Buffalo Music Awards. According to the Buffalo News, the band "was given to taking Kinks-inspired riffs, doubling the tempo, and then adding the sort of rough-but-right grit to the proceedings that belied the influence of their forebears, be they Ramrods or Stooges."

Disbanding in 2004, a farewell show was performed on November 27, 2004. The group then played a reunion show in 2009 and reunited again in December 2015 in Buffalo.

Mark Norris went on to form a new band named Mark Norris and The Backpeddlers. Brandon Delmont began playing in A House Safe For Tigers and Son of the Sun. Tommy Stanford began playing bass in the Missing Planes with Matt Barber; the "fifth" member of girlpope and plays lead guitar and sings in "The Nothing").

== Members ==
- Mark Norris: Vocals and guitar
- Richie Campagna: Bass and vocals
- Brandon Delmont: Drums
- Tommy Stanford: Guitar, vocals, keyboard

== Discography ==
=== Records ===
- 1996: Cheeses of Nazareth (Atom Smash Records, P22-003)
- 1999: The Whole Scene Going EP (Atom Smash Records, P22-007)
- 1995: I was A Teenage Jesus / She 7" (P22 Records, P22-001) – 3 versions: Black, White, and Burgundy limited edition vinyl
- 2001: Bobo vs. girlpope Live (Atom Smash Records, P22-011)
- 2002: The Whole Scene Going EP+bonus tracks (Shutdown Recordz (Australia))

=== Compilations ===
- 1995: WBNY Alive On Air – "Single Girl live" (WBNY 91.3)
- 1996: Temple Of Music – "Song About Girls" (Atom Smash Records, P22-002)
- 1998: MLR-1 – "So Far as Now" (Mary's Lounge, 61603710012)
- 1998: That Other Christmas CD Big Star's "Jesus Christ" (Hotwings HOT 8)
- 1999: COMP "Indy 500"
