= Frank C. Ludera =

American politician

Frank C. Ludera (March 8, 1934 - December 20, 2009) was a Democrat American politician from Buffalo, New York. He represented the 3rd District of the Erie County Legislature from 1968–1971.

Ludera was convicted of conspiracy to accept bribes on June 16, 1970 and sentenced to three years in prison in connection to a proposed dome football stadium to be built in Lancaster, New York.

Political offices
Preceded by Seat Created	3rd District Erie County Legislator; 1968-1971	Succeeded by Arthur W. Hardie
