= USNS 2nd Lt. John P. Bobo =

Prepositioning ship

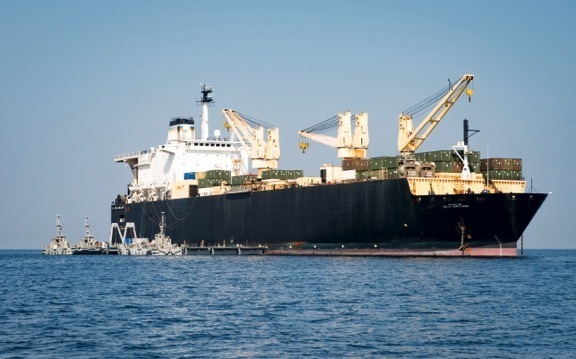
- USNS 2nd Lt. John P. Bobo off Fujairah, United Arab Emirates, on 20 January 2018

History

United States
- Name: 2nd Lt. John P. Bobo
- Namesake: John P. Bobo
- Owner: Military Sealift Command
- Builder: General Dynamics Quincy Shipbuilding Division, Quincy, Massachusetts
- Launched: 16 February 1985
- Completed: 1985
- Acquired: Ship purchased by Military Sealift Command on 16 January 2007
- Reclassified: from AK-3008, 2007
- Identification: IMO: 8219384; MMSI: 367049000; Callsign: NJPB
- Status: Stricken, awaiting scrapping

General characteristics
- Class & type: 2nd Lt. John P. Bobo-class dry cargo ship
- Displacement: 19,588 t.(lt); 40,846 t.(fl)
- Length: 673 ft (205 m)
- Beam: 105 ft (32 m)
- Draft: 34 ft 6 in (10.52 m)
- Ramps: 1 60/39 tons per square inch aft vehicle ramp
- Installed power: 2 × Stork Werkspoor 18TM410 (26,400 bhp combined)
- Propulsion: Single shaft; Bow thruster (1,000 bhp)
- Speed: 17.7 knots (32.8 km/h; 20.4 mph)
- Range: 12,840 nautical miles at 18 knots
- Capacity: 162,500 sq. ft. vehicle; 1,605,000 gallons petroleum; 81,700 gallons water; 522 TEU
- Aviation facilities: Helicopter platform

USNS 2nd Lt. John P. Bobo (T-AK-3008), formerly MV 2nd Lt. John P. Bobo (AK-3008) is a strategic sealift ship which served with the United States Navy since its original charter in 1985. The ship is named after US Marine Medal of Honor recipient Second Lieutenant John P. Bobo. She is the only US Navy ship to bear the name.

== Design ==
Built by the General Dynamics Quincy Shipbuilding Division of Quincy, Massachusetts, the USNS 2nd Lt. John P. Bobo is the lead of her class of roll-on/roll-off ships. These ships are built to support a 17,000 man US Marine Air Ground Task Force for 30 days.

Like the rest of her class, the ship is 673 feet [205.13 m] long, 105 feet [32 m] wide and has a draft of 29 feet [8.8 m], displacing 40,846 tons fully loaded.

The ship is built to carry roll on/roll off vehicles, ammunition, general and liquid cargo. The vessel has 162,500 square feet of vehicle storage space, can carry up to 1,605,000 gallons of petroleum, 81,700 gallons of water, and 522 twenty-foot equivalent unit containers. In addition to cargo space, 2 LCM-8, 1 Side Loadable Warping Tug, 4 Causeway Section, Powered, and 4 Causeway Section, Non Powered equipment can also be carried.

Vehicle storage is towards the aft, which is facilitated by a 1.538 tons per square inch retractable ramp.

Two Stork-Wartsila Werkspoor 18TM410 diesel engines provide 26,400 brake horse power (bhp) which allows the ship to make 17.7 knots though one shaft. It has a range of 12,840 nautical miles at 18 knots. In addition to the main engines, a 1,000 bhp (746 Watt) bow thruster aids in maneuvering. The low physical overhead of the engines allow for another deck of vehicle space above.

A total of five 39-ton cranes are used to move cargo, situated with two double cranes at midship and a single forward. One helicopter platform is located aft, rated to land up to a CH-53E helicopter.

== Service history ==
USNS 2nd Lt. John P. Bobo was chartered by the US Military Sealift Command on 14 February 1985 after completion. As it was not a commissioned ship, it was designated with the civilian prefix of M/V, motor vessel, not the military prefix of USNS, or United States Naval Ship. Unlike her four other sister ships at Guam, she is stationed in Europe for her career.

On 16 January 2007 the US Navy officially purchased the ship, designating her USNS.

In Europe, she was assigned to the Maritime Prepositioning Force (MPF) with Maritime Prepositioning Ship Squadron One where she served as its last flagship until its dissolution on 28 September 2012. The propose of the MPF is to strategically place supply ships in key parts of the world where the supplies onboard would be readily available in the event of a crisis.

On 17 April 2024, the USNS 2nd LT John P. Bobo, en route to the eastern Mediterranean to help the US military set up a pier for aid to Gaza had to turn back last week after experiencing a fire, a Navy spokesperson told CNN. It is not clear how the delay will affect the construction of the floating pier and causeway, which the Pentagon has said is expected to be operational by late April or early May.

On 1 November 2024, the vessel arrived at the James River Reserve Fleet. On 8 November 2024, the ship was downgraded to non-retention status. As of 11 August 2025, the vessel has arrived in the port of Brownsville, Texas for scrapping.

== Gallery ==
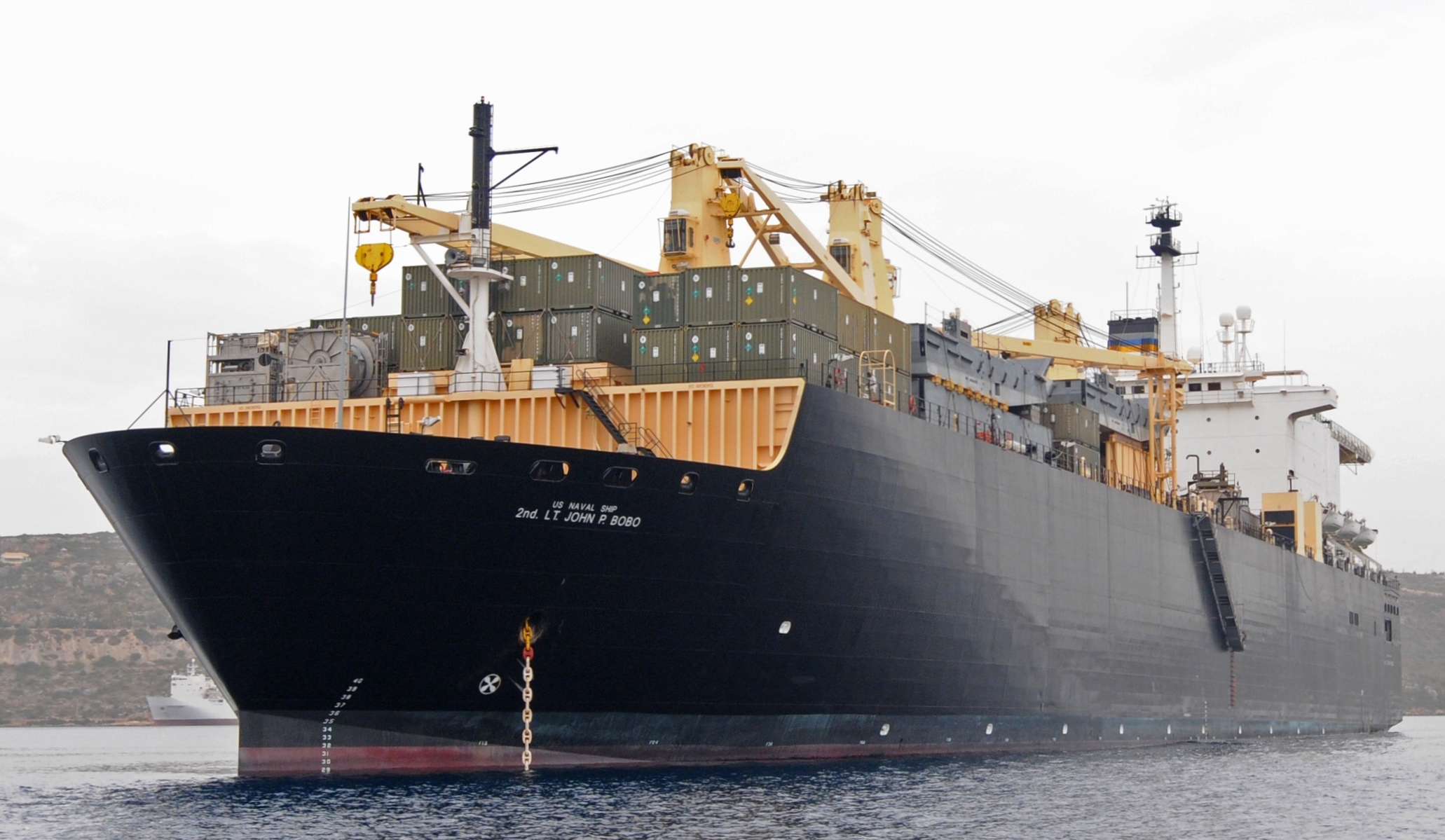
Bow view of the USNS 2nd Lt. John P. Bobo

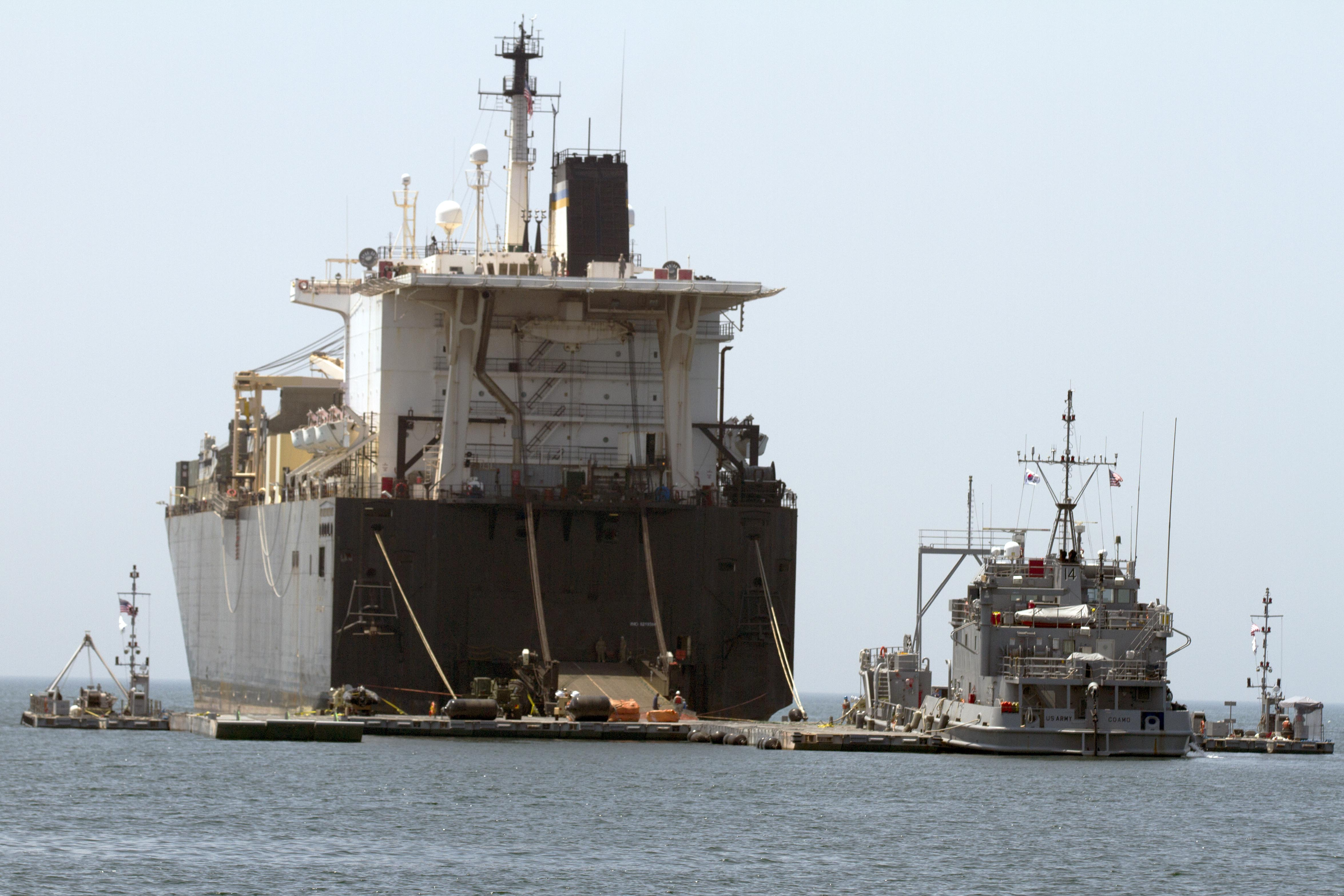
Aft view of USNS 2nd Lt. John P. Bobo

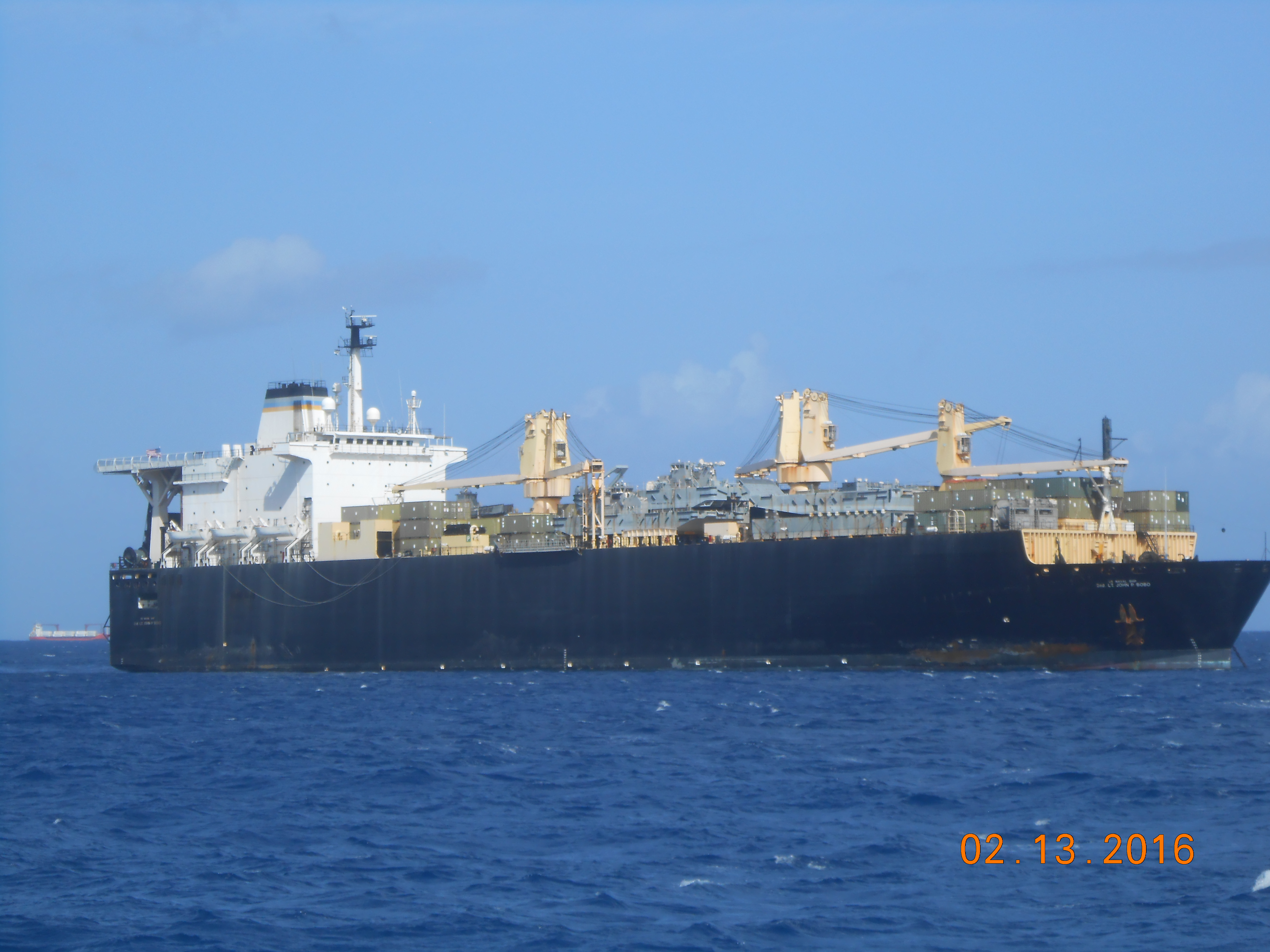
USNS 2nd Lt. John P. Bobo (T-AK-3008) off the coast of Saipan

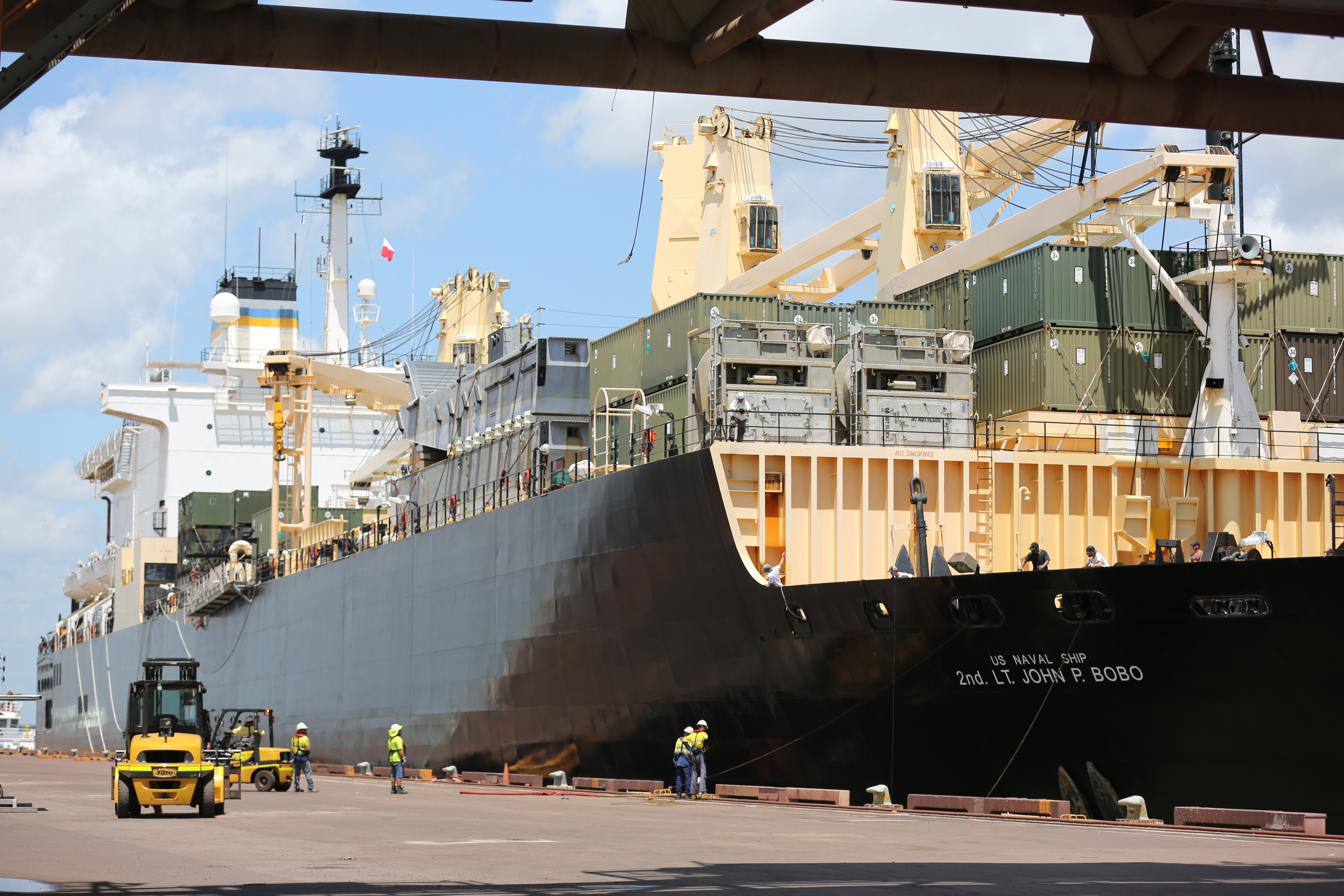
Marines offload MRF-D gear off of USNS 2nd Lt. John P. Bobo

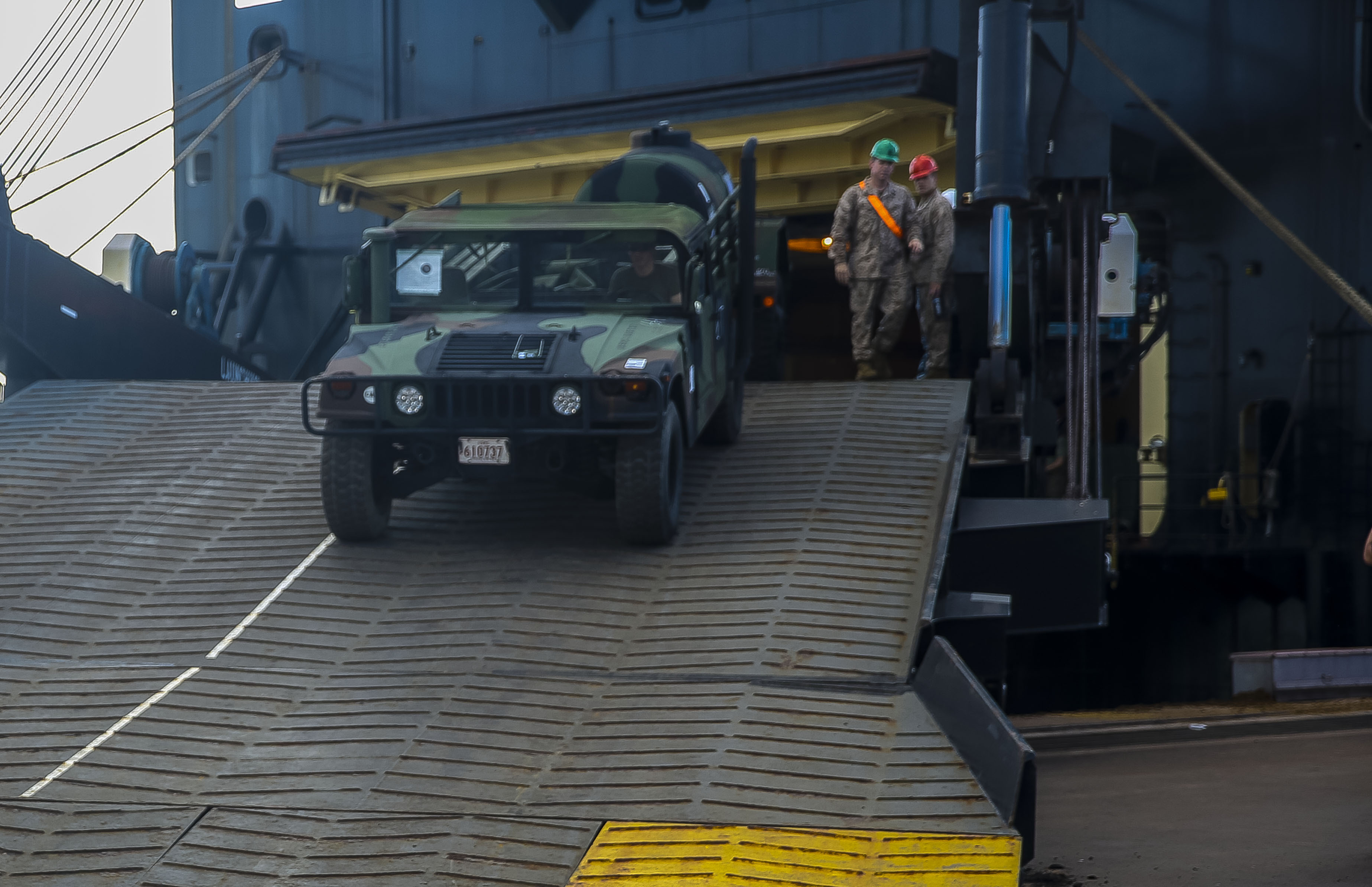
USNS 2nd Lt. John P. Bobo unloads vehicles though its ramp.

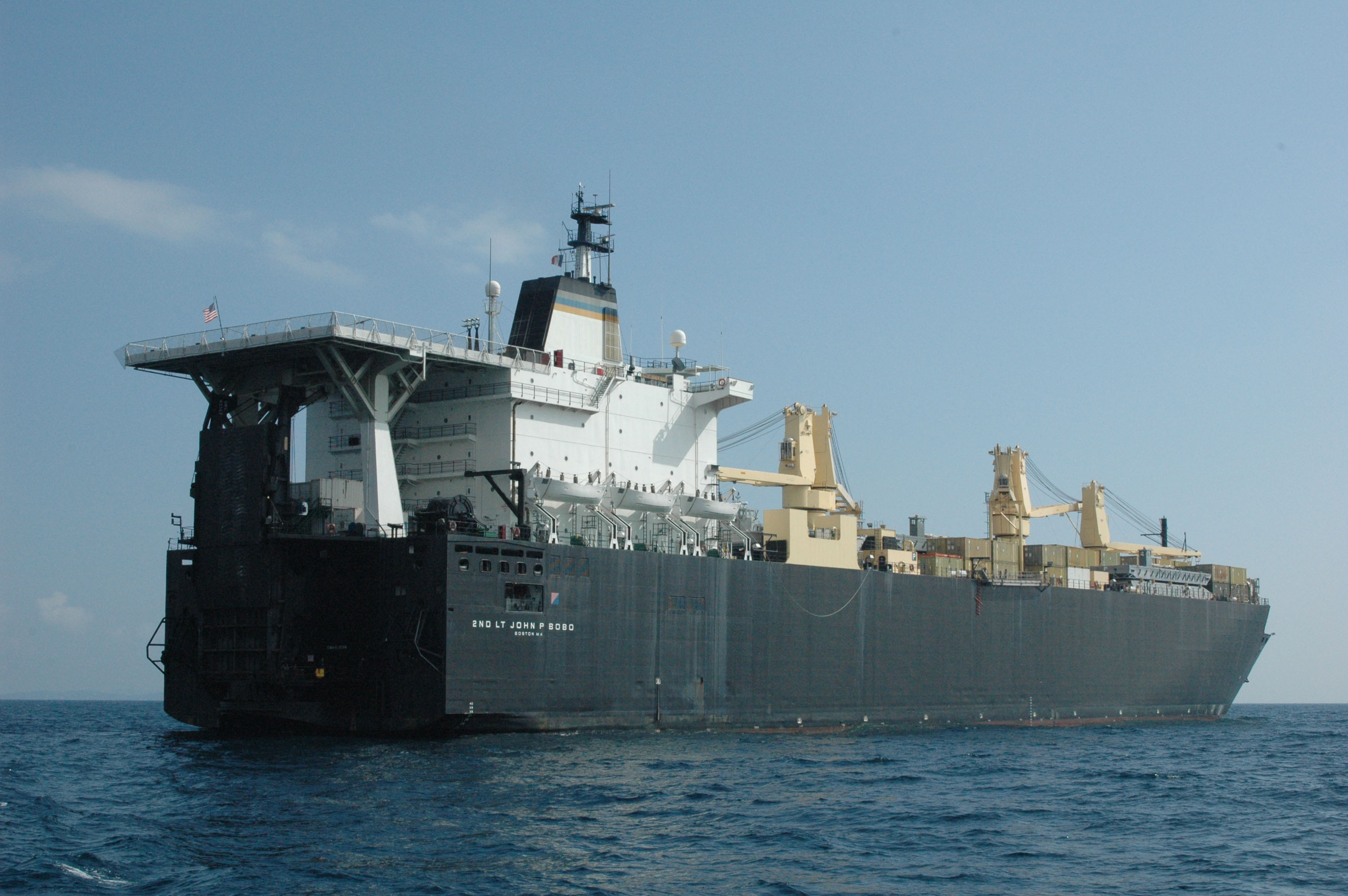
Quarter view of the 2nd Lt. John P. Bobo

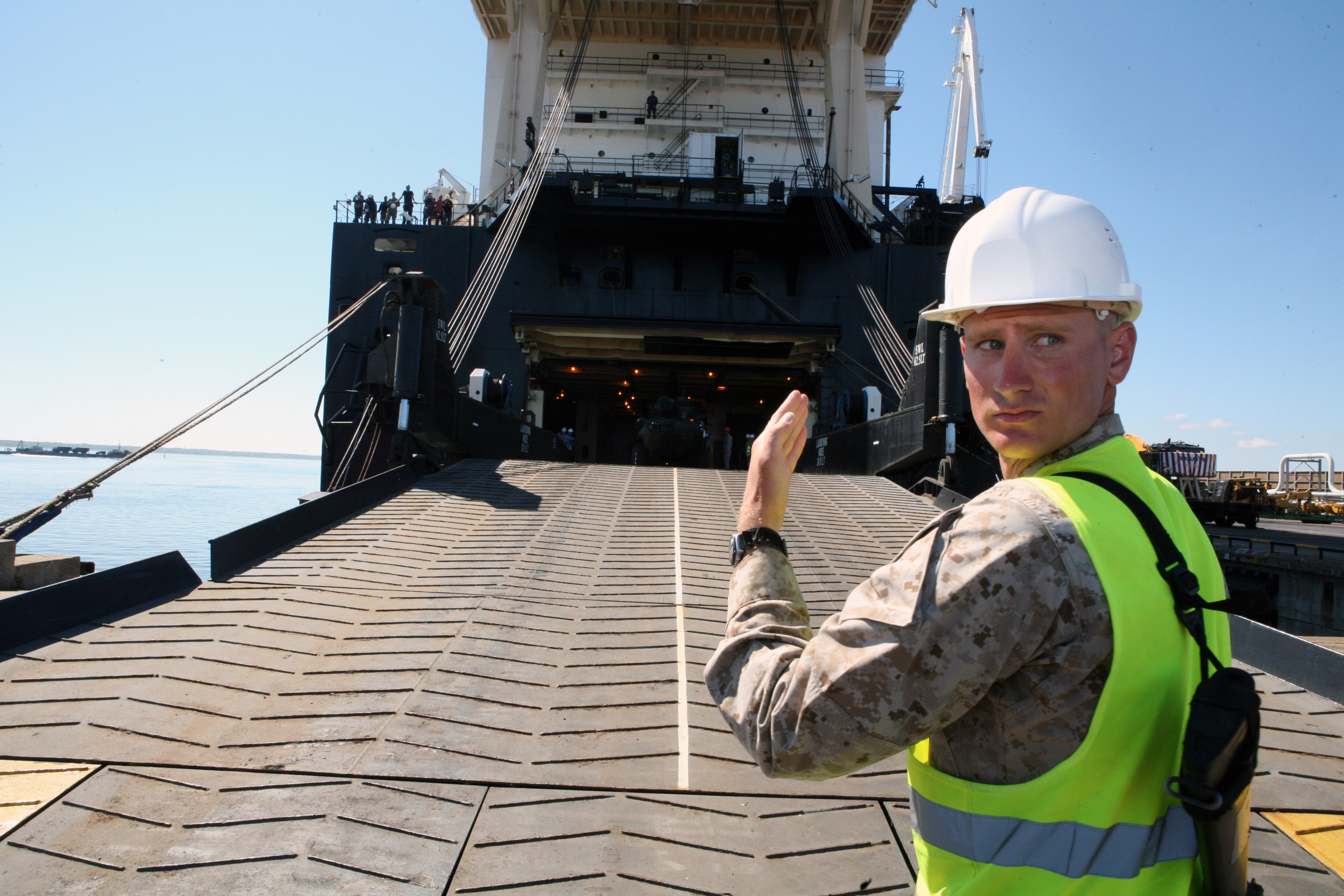
The deployed vehicle ramp of a 2nd Lt. John P. Bobo class Ro/Ro ship
