= Z. Mann Zilla =

American rapper (born 1976)

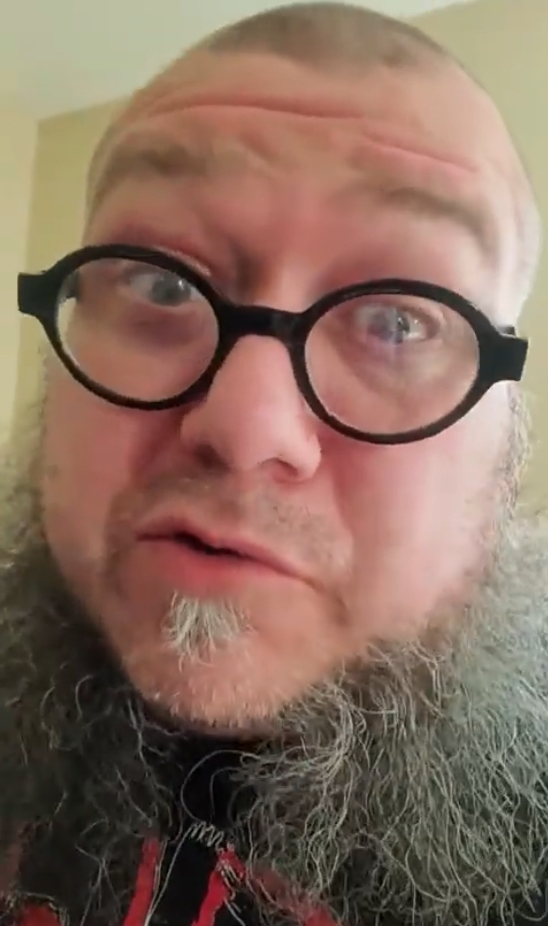
- Zilla in 2022

Background information
- Also known as: ZMann, The 800lb Vanilla Gorilla
- Born: July 23, 1976 (age 49)
- Origin: Buffalo, New York
- Genres: Alternative hip hop
- Occupations: Rapper, artist
- Website: www.pandangit.com

Z. Mann Zilla (born July 23, 1976) is an American rapper and artist.

== Artistic career ==
Z. Mann Zilla depicted the adventures of the fictional character "Guy Friday", as part of the liner notes for the David Kane Quartet album The Life And Times of Guy Friday. The art style drew from a variety of sources, including Bill Keane's Family Circus and anime. He is also credited with creating animatics for the animated short Clicker Clatter. This is in addition to his many other artistic projects. Z. Mann participated in various art festivals in Buffalo, New York, including the annual Music Is Art Festival and Buffalo Infringement Festival.

== Musical career ==
Z. Mann formed a band called "Z. Mann Zilla & The World's Largest Trio," which consisted of about eight members, including a banjo player and blindfolded guitarist. The band combined freestyle rapping, improvisational acts, and showmanship, but ultimately broke up in 2007 when ZMann moved out of his hometown of Buffalo.

Z. Mann also recorded a song with Amungus titled "Monochrome Monotony".
