= John P. Bobo =

United States Marine Corps Medal of Honor recipient

John Paul Bobo
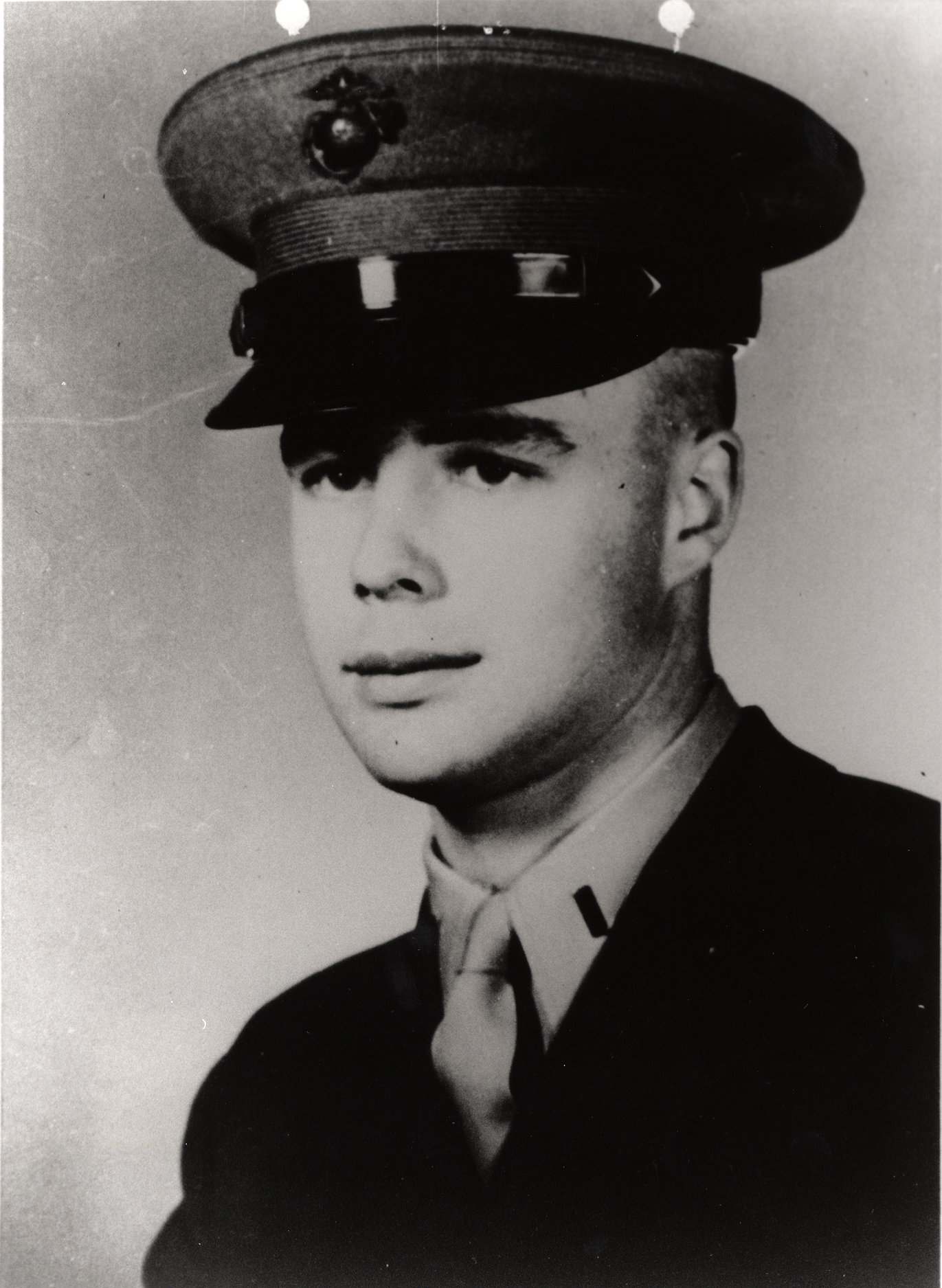
- John P. Bobo, Medal of Honor recipient
- Born: February 14, 1943; Niagara Falls, New York, U.S.
- Died: March 30, 1967 (aged 24) near Con Thien, Quang Tri Province, Republic of Vietnam
- Burial place: Gate of Heaven Cemetery, Lewiston, New York
- Military career
- Allegiance: United States of America
- Branch: United States Marine Corps
- Service years: 1965–1967
- Rank: Second Lieutenant
- Units: Company I, 3rd Battalion, 9th Marines, 3rd Marine Division
- Conflicts: Vietnam War †
- Awards: Medal of Honor; Purple Heart Medal (2); Combat Action Ribbon; National Order of Vietnam; RVN Gallantry Cross Medal

John Paul Bobo (February 14, 1943 – March 30, 1967) was a United States Marine Corps second lieutenant who posthumously received the Medal of Honor for heroism during the Vietnam War on March 30, 1967.

== Biography ==
John Paul Bobo was born on February 14, 1943, in Niagara Falls, New York. He attended Bishop Duffy High School where he is today distinguished as an honored alum. Bobo graduated from Niagara University in Niagara Falls, New York, in 1965.

=== US Marine Corps ===
Bobo enlisted in the U.S. Marine Corps Reserve on May 28, 1965, in Buffalo while attending Niagara University. He received a B.A. Degree in History in June 1965, and was commissioned a second lieutenant in the Marine Corps Reserve on December 17, 1965. Bobo completed the Officer Candidate Course, The Basic School, Marine Corps Schools, Quantico, Virginia, in May 1966.

Bobo was ordered to the Republic of Vietnam (South Vietnam) in June 1966 and was assigned duty as the Second Platoon commander, Company I, 3rd Battalion, 9th Marine Regiment, 3rd Marine Division. While serving in Company I, 9th Marines, during Operation Prairie III, he was mortally wounded when a large number of NVA soldiers attacked his rifle company's night ambush position (at Hill 70, west of Con Thien) in Quang Tri Province near the Demilitarized Zone in South Vietnam on March 30, 1967. Knowing his wounds would prevent him from making it to safety, Bobo twice refused medical care and evacuation from his Navy Corpsman, ordering his men to retreat while he stayed behind alone to fight the North Vietnamese attackers. His actions during this battle, known as the Battle of Getlin's Corner, saved the lives of all of his men. For this, Bobo was posthumously awarded the Medal of Honor.

Bobo is buried in Gate of Heaven Cemetery in Lewiston, New York.

== Military decorations and awards ==
2nd Lieutenant Bobo's military awards include:

Medal of Honor		Purple Heart Medal w/ one 5/16 inch gold star
Combat Action Ribbon	Presidential Unit Citation w/ one bronze service star. 3rd Battalion, 9th Marine Regiment cited for the periods 15 Aug 65 – 7 Jan 67 and 1 Mar-15 Sep 67.	National Defense Service Medal
Vietnam Service Medal w/ two bronze service stars for the Vietnam Counteroffensive (25 Dec 65 – 30 Jun 66) and Vietnam Counteroffensive Phase II (1 Jul 66 – 31 May 67) campaigns.	National Order of Vietnam, Knight	RVN Gallantry Cross Medal w/ palm
RVN Gallantry Cross Unit Citation Emblem with Palm and Frame (in the colors of the Gallantry Cross)	RVN Civil Actions Medal Unit Citation Emblem with Palm and Frame (in the colors of the Civil Actions Medal, First Class)	RVN Campaign Medal w/ 60- device

== Personal namings and honors ==
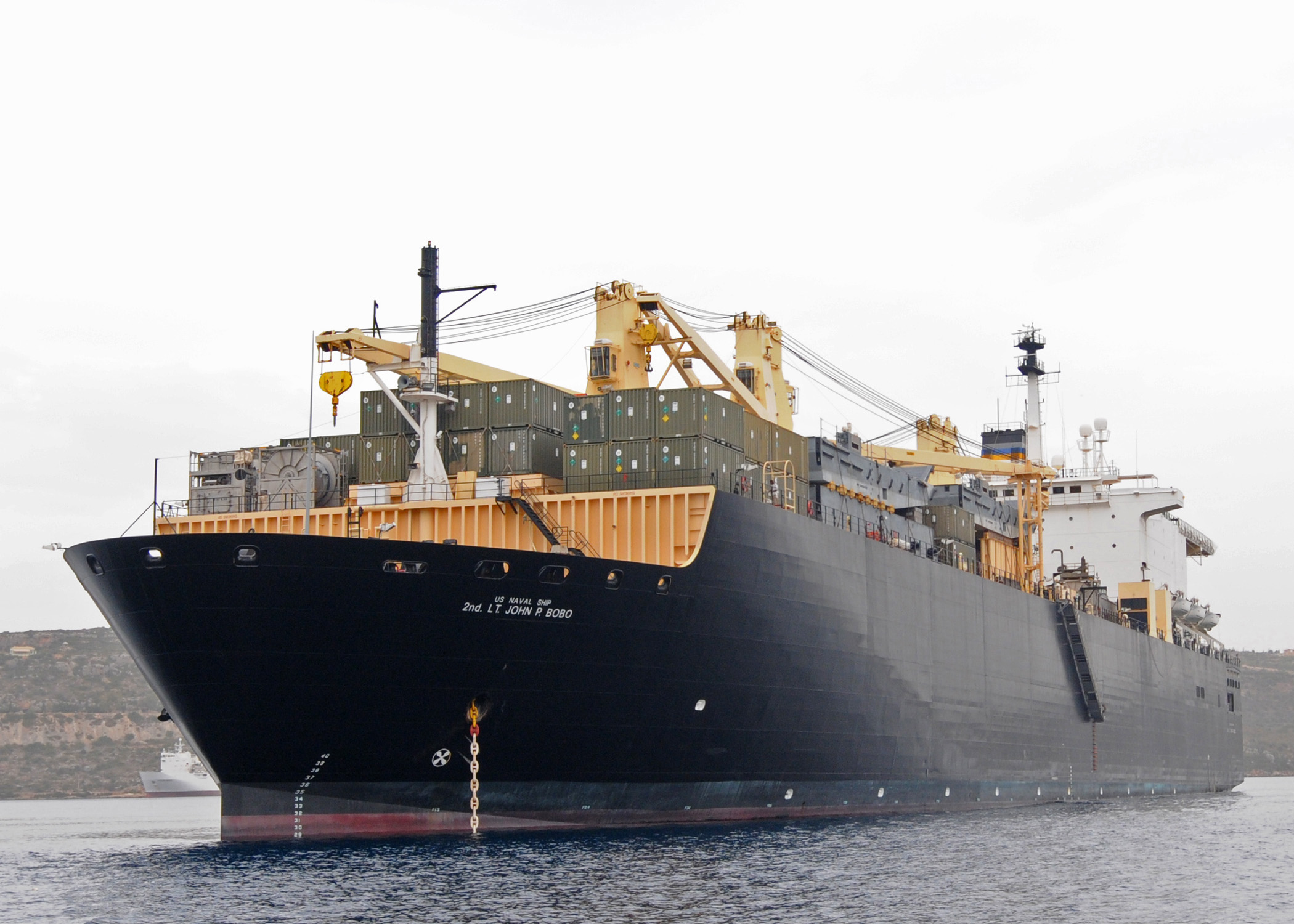
Maritime prepositioning ship USNS 2nd Lt. John P. Bobo is anchored in Souda Bay, Greece in 2010.

Lt. Bobo namings and honors include:

- The U.S. Navy has three classes of ships in its Marine Prepositioning Fleet — the newest class, which were built by General Dynamics and delivered to Military Sealift Command in the mid-1980s, is named the 2nd Lt. John P. Bobo Class.
- The lead ship of the 2nd Lt. John P. Bobo Class of the Marine Prepositioning Fleet is the 673-foot (205 m) long maritime prepositioning ship, USNS 2nd Lt. John P. Bobo. Since 1985, the ship had been under long-term lease to Military Sealift Command from American Overseas Marine. On January 16, 2007, the Military Sealift Command purchased the 673-foot (205 m) maritime prepositioning ship, USNS 2nd Lt. John P. Bobo.
- The Marine Corps Officer Candidate School, Marine Corps Base Quantico, Virginia, Officers Mess, is called Bobo Hall.
- John Bobo's name is memorialized on the Medal of Honor monument, Niagara Falls State Park.
- John Bobo's name is etched on the Vietnam Veterans Memorial, Panel 17E, Row 070.
- Niagara University's baseball field is named, John P. Bobo Field.
- The Marine Corps Security Forces Response facility at Naval Weapons Station Earle was dedicated to 2nd Lt. John Bobo.

== Medal of Honor citation ==
The President of the United States in the name of The Congress takes pride in presenting the MEDAL OF HONOR posthumously to

SECOND LIEUTENANT JOHN P. BOBO
UNITED STATES MARINE CORPS

for service as set forth in the following CITATION:

For conspicuous gallantry and intrepidity at the risk of his life above and beyond the call of duty as Weapons Platoon Commander, Company I, Third Battalion, Ninth Marines, Third Marine Division, in Quang Tri Province, Republic of Vietnam, on 30 March 1967. Company I was establishing night ambush sites when the command group was attacked by a reinforced North Vietnamese company supported by heavy automatic weapons and mortar fire. Lieutenant BOBO immediately organized a hasty defense and moved from position to position encouraging the outnumbered Marines despite the murderous enemy fire. Recovering a rocket launcher from among the friendly casualties, he organized a new launcher team and directed its fire into the enemy machine gun position. When an exploding enemy mortar round severed Lieutenant Bobo's right leg below the knee, he refused to be evacuated and insisted upon being placed in a firing position to cover the movement of the command group to a better location. With a web belt around his leg serving as tourniquet and with his leg jammed into the dirt to curtail the bleeding, he remained in this position and delivered devastating fire into the ranks of the enemy attempting to overrun the Marines. Lieutenant BOBO was mortally wounded while firing his weapon into the main point of the enemy attack but his valiant spirit inspired his men to heroic efforts, and his tenacious stand enabled the command group to gain a protective position where it repulsed the enemy onslaught. Lieutenant BOBO's superb leadership, dauntless courage, and bold initiative reflected great credit upon himself and upheld the highest traditions of the Marine Corps and the United States Naval Service. He gallantly gave his life for his country.

/S/LYNDON B. JOHNSON

== See also ==
- List of Medal of Honor recipients
- List of Medal of Honor recipients for the Vietnam War
