= Paul Noworyta =

American skateboarder (born 1969)

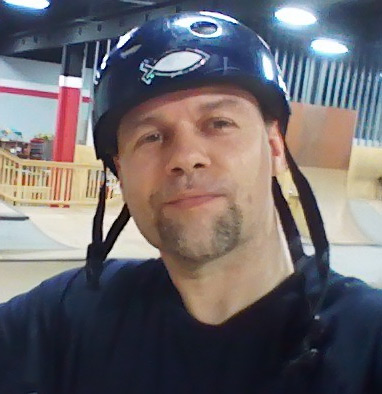

Personal information
- Born: April 7, 1969 (age 57) Buffalo, New York, U.S.

Sport
- Sport: Vert skating

Paul Noworyta is an American professional vert skater who became the first and only athlete in the world to compete on the pro vert circuit after receiving a kidney transplant at the Cleveland Clinic in Ohio on September 6, 1989. Noworyta started riding vert ramps in 1983 and later became the oldest rookie pro the sport had ever seen at age 33. He wrote a book about his life in 2006, Transplant to Handplant, and is an outspoken kidney transplant advocate. He offers a free post-kidney transplant course at the website kidney.thinkific.com. His favorite tricks on vert are the McTwist 540, pop tarts, big disaster inverts, and backflips.

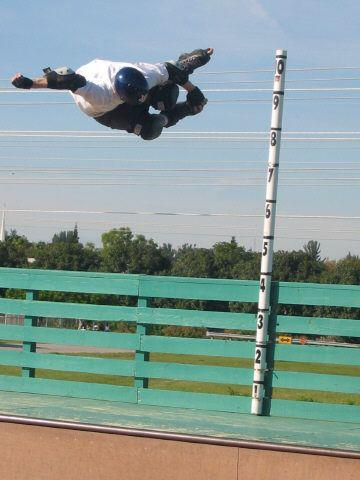
Noworyta at Brian Piccolo Skatepark, Cooper City, Florida

== Vert competitions ==
- 2021 Vert-Be-Que, Las Vegas, NV: Honorary Guest Skater
- 2003 LG Action Sports World Championships Los Angeles, CA Vert: 13th
- 2003 NBC Gravity Games Cleveland, OH – Vert: 12th
- 2003 Mobile Skatepark Series Buffalo, NY – Vert: 9th
- 2003 Mobile Skatepark Series Cincinnati, OH – Vert: 10th
- 2002 ASA World Championships Los Angeles, CA – Vert: 4th
