= WBNY =

Coordinates: 42.933111°N 78.882806°W

- Buffalo, New York; United States
- Frequency: 91.3 MHz
- Branding: "91.3 WBNY"

Programming
- Format: Campus radio

Ownership
- Owner: Buffalo State College (State University of New York)

History
- First air date: 1982
- Call sign meaning: Buffalo, New York

Technical information
- Licensing authority: FCC
- Class: A
- ERP: 1,150 watts (horizontal); 1,040 watts (vertical)
- HAAT: 35 meters (115 ft)

Links
- Public license information: Public file; LMS
- Webcast: WMA Live Stream
- Website: wbny.buffalostate.edu

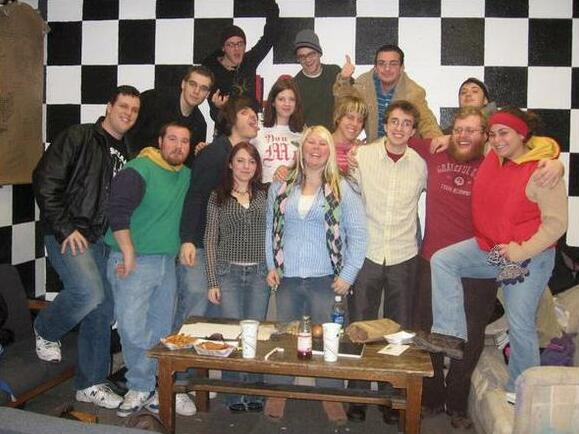
2005-2006 DJs of WBNY in the Checkerboard Lounge

WBNY is a student-run radio station licensed to Buffalo State University in Buffalo, New York. The station, which was started in 1982, broadcasts on 91.3 FM.

The station maintains its studios at Campbell Student Union 220, with transmitter facilities located in Porter Hall. It broadcasts with an effective radiated power of 1,000 watts, increased from 100 watts on October 16, 2013, allowing full campus-wide coverage, as well as coverage as far south as South Buffalo and as far west as Fort Erie, Ontario.

== History ==
WBNY is the descendant of the college's AM carrier-current station known as WSCB, which could be received only through the campus's electrical system. The WBNY call letters were previously assigned to 1400 AM in Buffalo in the 1940s and 1950s. WBNY also has been used as the call sign for a "long-running" shortwave pirate radio station.

The station has been entirely student run since its inception. Carrier-current predecessor WSCB General Manager Michael Lesser and Program Director Scott Michaeloff were the directors of the WBNY effort, along with staff such as Tom Connolly. Lesser, who was also a VP of the Student Government, embraced the vision of Connolly and others, successfully petitioning the FCC and secured funding from the United Students Government (USG) to create WBNY. The DJ lounge, WBNY's "Lesser Lounge", was named in honor of the founding GM.

Music programs on WBNY include two- and three-hour blocks of RPM, punk rock, retro, folk/bluegrass, loud rock, jazz, American Roots, reggae, hip hop, and "format" shows, consisting of music from WBNY's library rotation. Once a week, there is a six-hour block of talk radio, featuring shows and discussions about professional wrestling, politics, sports, and trivia. The wrestling radio show "Monday Night Mayhem" originated on WBNY and after moving to an Internet-only broadcast in December 2004, continued to be popular.

== Introducing new music ==
With its start in 1982, WBNY began featuring alternative music by bands that at the time were relatively unknown — The Police, U2, and The Thompson Twins, among many others. In partnership with Student Union Board, the station also co-sponsored a series of concerts at Buffalo State featuring many of the recording artists its program hosts were playing, including The Ramones, R.E.M., The Cure, The Replacements, Talking Heads, and The Violent Femmes.

== Notable alumni ==
- David Blaustein – Entertainment correspondent, ABC News Radio
- Howard Simon – Sports anchor WGR, Buffalo, New York
- Byron Brown – Mayor of Buffalo, New York
- Frank Stasio – Host, The State of Things, WUNC

== See also ==
- College radio
- List of college radio stations in the United States
