= Karen Klimczak =

Karen Klimczak, S.S.J. (October 27, 1943 – April 14, 2006), a member of the Sisters of St. Joseph of Buffalo, New York, was murdered there on April 14, 2006. She had just returned from Good Friday services.

== Life ==
Klimczak ministered to women prisoners in a local prison, visiting them and helping their families. As a result of her experiences there, she, together with the Rev. Roy Herberger, a Catholic priest, had developed the goal of helping former prisoners in the Bissonette House, a home for parolees on the city's East Side. The home is named after a Catholic priest, Joseph Bissonette, who had lived on site. Joseph was murdered in 1987 by two teenagers, Theodore Simmons and Milton Jones, whom he was trying to help. In a repetition of history, it was one of the residents of the house who murdered Sister Karen, after she caught him stealing her cell phone. During the incident, the resident had been under the influence of crack cocaine.

Sister Karen Klimczak was well known throughout Buffalo. She had launched a campaign of leaving large cut-out doves at the scenes of Buffalo homicides. These doves, stating "I leave Peace Prints" became increasingly popular right after her death. The doves are now posted throughout the Buffalo community as a result of Peaceprints(TM) Prison Ministries, an organization started as a result of Sister Karen's work.

During the 1970s, Klimczak was an elementary and junior high school teacher at St. Stanislaus School in Chicopee, Massachusetts.

== Legacy ==
The SSJ Sister Karen Klimczak Center for Nonviolence was opened in February 2007 to continue the work she had done. It offers opportunities for people to learn and practice nonviolence. Offerings include training in the Alternatives to Violence Project, educational outreach and support for groups working with at-risk inner-city youth. A book was published by the congregation in 2008, Peaceprints: Sister Karen’s Paths to Nonviolence.
