= Donald Cyril Lubick =

American attorney (1926–2022)

Don Lubick

Personal details
- Born: Donald Cyril Lubick; April 29, 1926 Buffalo, New York, U.S.
- Died: February 8, 2022 (aged 95) Washington, D.C., U.S.
- Political party: Republican (formerly); Democratic
- Education: University at Buffalo (BA); Harvard University (JD)

Donald Cyril Lubick (April 29, 1926 – February 8, 2022) was an American attorney and tax policy expert. He served every Democratic President—from John F. Kennedy to Barack Obama—and was the Assistant Secretary for Tax Policy at the Department of the Treasury under both President Carter and President Clinton.

== Early life and education ==
Lubick was born on April 29, 1926, in Buffalo, New York. He graduated from Lafayette High School, where he was a member of the Debate Team and the Virgil Club, which studied the works of Homer, Ovid and other classics, in 1942 at the age of 16. Lubick attended the University of Buffalo on a full-tuition scholarship and graduated in three years by including extra night and summer courses. He received his bachelor's degree, summa cum laude, in September 1945. At the University of Buffalo, Lubick was inducted into Phi Beta Kappa.

After serving in the 15th Army Air Force, Lubick relied upon the G.I. Bill to receive a law school education from Harvard Law School. At the end of his first year of law school he was elected to join the Harvard Legal Aid Bureau. At the end of his second year he was invited to join the Harvard Law Review but decided to remain with the Harvard Legal Aid Bureau, of which he became president in his third year. He graduated magna cum laude in 1949 and then spent a year as one of Harvard's first Teaching Fellows, promoting a new program including cross subject material for each first year student.

== Career ==
Lubick returned to his hometown of Buffalo and joined the law firm Hodgson, Russ, Andrews, Woods & Goodyear, one of the two largest law firms in Buffalo, as an associate in 1950. At the same time as he started in practice he served as an adjunct professor at the School of Law of the University at Buffalo (which became the State University of Buffalo in 1962). He became a partner in the law firm in 1955. He left the firm in 1961 to join the U.S. Department of the Treasury as Tax Legislative Counsel in charge of the lawyers in the Office of Tax Policy. He returned to the law firm in 1964. His practice focused on individual and corporate tax advice, pension planning, and estate planning for a variety of clients, including Houdaille Industries (now IDEX Corporation), Cornell Aeronautical Lab, Computer Task Group Incorporated, Par Pharmaceutical, Kaiser Permanente, and the Catholic Diocese of Buffalo. While in practice in Buffalo, Lubick was a member of the World Hospitality Group, which cooperated with the State Department in hosting foreign representatives visiting the U.S. to Niagara Falls and its area.

Lubick left private practice again for the Treasury in 1977. After serving in the Carter Administration, Lubick returned to Hodgson Russ in 1981. He was elected Managing Partner and established the firm's Washington, D.C., office that year. In 1989, he became a Licensed Foreign Legal Consultant by the Law Society of Upper Canada, and helped established Hodgson Russ's Canadian office, limited to U.S. law. Lubick retired from Hodgson Russ in 1994, having served with the firm for parts of five decades, to work in the Clinton Administration.

In addition to the teaching at the University at Buffalo, Lubick taught a seminar on comparative corporate taxation after leaving the Treasury in 1999 at the American University of Washington College of Law.

Lubick chaired the Tax Reform Committee for the City of Buffalo in 1958 and 1959 and served on the Advisory Committee on Reform of the Election Laws of the New York State Legislature in 1974. He chaired the American Bar Association's Committee on Domestic Relations Tax Problems, served on the Advisory Group to the Commissioner of Internal Revenue, and was a member of the American Law Institute. Throughout his career, Lubick advocated for “efficiency, simplicity, and horizontal equity” in the tax code, and he valued teamwork and comradery among his co-workers. While working in government, Lubick was known for his bipartisan relationships with members of Congress and support from both White House and Treasury Department officials.

=== Federal Government service ===
During the four decades from 1961 until 2001, Lubick served in the Department of the Treasury in the Kennedy, Johnson, Carter, and Clinton Administrations. He also served on then-President-elect Obama's 2008 transition team.

==== Kennedy and Johnson administrations ====
Following President Kennedy's election, his then-Assistant Secretary of the Treasury for Tax Policy, Stanley Surrey, asked Lubick to serve as Tax Legislative Counsel for the Office of Tax Policy at the Department of the Treasury, one of the highest tax policy positions in the Executive Branch. Lubick was a registered Republican at the time. As a result, prominent Democrats initially opposed his appointment. Surrey appreciated Lubick's combination of practical experience and policy analysis. The opposition relented after local Erie County Democrats intervened and the White House determined Lubick would be able to serve the Kennedy Administration well.

Lubick left Hodgson Russ for the first time in September 1961 to serve as Tax Legislative Counsel, a position he held for two and a half years under both President Kennedy and President Johnson. While at the Treasury, Lubick worked on the development and passage of President Kennedy's tax reform legislation, the Revenue Act of 1962 (P.L. 87-834) and the Revenue Act of 1964 (P.L. 88-272). Lubick remained at the Treasury until 1964 before returning to Buffalo to practice law at Hodgson Russ.

==== Carter administration ====
Laurence Woodworth, former Chief of Staff of the Joint Committee of Congress and President Carter's first Assistant Secretary for Tax Policy, recruited Lubick to return to the Treasury Department in 1977. Lubick joined the Carter Administration and initially served under Woodworth as Deputy Assistant Secretary for Tax Legislation.

Upon Woodworth's sudden death in December 1977, Treasury Secretary Michael Blumenthal recommended to President Carter that Lubick replace Woodworth. In a memo to President Carter, Blumenthal stated he found Lubick “extremely competent and reliable to work with.” The American Bar Association's Tax Section and former Internal Revenue Service Commissioners, as well as Senate Finance Committee Chairman Senator Russell B. Long (D-LA) and House Ways and Means Committee Chairman Al Ullman (D-OR) supported Lubick's nomination. Lubick was confirmed as Assistant Secretary for Tax Policy on June 23, 1978.

Lubick was a longtime advocate for comprehensive tax reform and played a key role in drafting the Carter Administration's tax legislation. Facing opposition in Congress, the Carter Administration later scaled back its tax reform plans, and President Carter signed the Revenue Act of 1978 (P.L. 95-600) into law without significant reform, although some of the proposals later were adopted during the subsequent Reagan Administration. Lubick was also instrumental in crafting one of the most significant reform proposals of the Carter Administration, Reorganization Plan No. 4, which allocated significant aspects of the Employee Retirement Security Act of 1974 (ERISA) between the Department of Labor and the Internal Revenue Service. In addition to tax reform, Lubick was also involved in developing President Carter's energy legislation.

As the Assistant Secretary for Tax Policy, Lubick was often called on to testify before Congress with respect to the Carter Administration's position on tax legislation. He testified on various tax matters, including recognition of unrealized capital gain at death, limiting tax-exempt securities to finance single-family housing, disallowing tax credits for political campaign contributions, limiting tax-free treatment for both employer and employee fringe benefits, and requiring tax withholding for independent contractors to avoid the necessity of a dispute whether a worker is an employee rather than an independent contractor.

==== Clinton administration ====
From 1994 to 1996, Lubick served as Director of the Treasury Department's Office of International Tax Assistance to Developing Countries at the OECD in Paris. He travelled roughly half of every month to visit two or more of the participating countries—Slovakia, Poland, Hungary, Rumania, Bulgaria, Macedonia, Estonia, Lithuania, Latvia, Russia, Kazakhstan, and Ukraine—to review the work of his representatives and meet with the key persons of the countries' finance ministries.

Lubick was recalled to fill the position of Assistant Secretary of the Treasury for Tax Policy in June 1996 and was confirmed by the Senate on February 12, 1998.

In December 1998, Lubick worked with then-Deputy Treasury Secretary Lawrence Summers on a pensions initiative to create a universal retirement savings proposal separate from Social Security. President Clinton announced the proposal in his 1999 State of the Union address. It has never been adopted.

Similar to his time in the Carter Administration, Lubick often testified before Congress to present the Clinton Administration's position on tax legislation. He testified on various tax proposals, including opposing tax incentives for U.S. oil and gas producers, supporting President Clinton's proposed budget, raising concerns about corporate tax shelters, supporting small business tax relief, supporting long-term funding for the Airport and Airway Trust Fund, expanding pension coverage and retirement benefits for low-income workers, and advocating for taxpayer rights proposals.

In 1997, as Assistant Secretary for Tax Policy, Lubick led the development of a package of 59 proposals intended to protect taxpayer rights and provide for tax simplification. Most of these proposals were adopted by Congress in the Taxpayer Relief Act of 1997.

Lubick was also heavily involved in the preparation and release of the Treasury Department's influential policy study on the deferral of income earned through U.S. controlled foreign corporations. As Assistant Secretary for Tax Policy, Lubick outlined the fundamental international tax policy principles that would guide the Treasury in its evaluation of the options for reforming or replacing the subpart F regime as in place at the time.

=== International Tax Policy Beyond the Treasury Department ===
In addition to his international tax policy work at the Treasury Department, in the late 1980s and early 1990s, Lubick served on the International Monetary Fund's expert panel on fiscal affairs and was a Senior Fellow with Harvard Institute of International Tax (HIIT). HIIT was invited by the United Nations representative to send Lubick to the Dominican Republic to develop a tax law for the Dominican Republic. With his recruited partner, Ward M. Hussey, former Legislative Counsel to the U.S. House of Representatives, Lubick worked with the Dominican Republic Treasury over four years, developing the income tax law that was enacted in 1994. The new tax law has been recognized as significantly improving the Dominican Republic's economy, and Lubick received a ceremonial appreciation at the Dominican Republic Embassy in Washington, D.C. Lubick's and Hussey's work in the Dominican Republic was also the basis for their book, Basic World Tax Code and Commentary. The book includes a sample tax code with draft tax laws and commentary aimed at serving as a tax reform template for developing countries around the world, and especially those former Soviet republics developing their own tax systems. The book has been translated into at least a dozen languages for various countries needing assistance, including Poland, the Dominican Republic, Czechoslovakia, Bulgaria, and Russia.

== Personal life and death ==
Lubick married Susan Lubick (née Cohen) June 5, 1960, and they had three children. Lubick and his wife resided in Chevy Chase, Maryland, and have maintained a home in Fort Erie, Ontario, across the Niagara River from Buffalo, since 1967. Lubick was a member and an officer in his synagogues, Temple Beth El (now Temple Beth Tzedek) in Buffalo, New York, and Adas Israel Congregation in Washington, D.C. He died on February 8, 2022, at the age of 95.

== Awards ==
Throughout his time at the Department of the Treasury, Lubick received various awards for his public service, including:

- 1964: Treasury Exceptional Service Award, for his service as Tax Legislative Counsel
- 1980: Alexander Hamilton Award, the Department of the Treasury's highest honor, for his service as Assistant Secretary for Tax Policy
- 1999: Treasury Medal, for his leadership with respect to consideration and passage of The Taxpayer Relief Act of 1997 and efforts to reform the Internal Revenue Service, among other accomplishments
- 1999: Federal Bar Association Section of Taxation's Kenneth H. Liles Distinguished Service Award, for his service as Assistant Secretary of Tax Policy
- 2018: Chamber of Commerce Award, Dominican Republic, for his contributions that culminated in the enactment for the Dominican Republic Fiscal Code

In 2016, the Urban-Brookings Tax Policy Center established the Donald C. Lubick Symposium to honor his government service by holding an annual public event each spring with policymakers, government officials, scholars, and members of the press to discuss tax policy and tax administration issues.
