= WDCX =

WDCX may refer to:

- WDCX (AM), a radio station (990 AM) licensed to Rochester, New York, United States
- WDCX-FM, a radio station (99.5 FM) licensed to Buffalo, New York, United States
- WDCZ, a radio station (970 AM) licensed to Buffalo, New York, which simulcasts WDCX-FM
