= WNED =

WNED may refer to:

- WNED-FM, a radio station (94.5 FM) licensed to serve Buffalo, New York, United States
- WNED-TV, a television station (channel 31, virtual 17) licensed to serve Buffalo, New York
- WDCZ, a radio station (970 AM) licensed to serve Buffalo, New York, which held the call sign WNED from 1993 to 2012
