= WEBR (disambiguation) =

Three transmission stations were formerly known as WEBR, which has been assigned to a radio station on AM 1440 licensed to Niagara Falls, New York since July 2020:

- WDCZ, a radio station (970 AM) licensed to serve Buffalo, New York, which held the call sign WEBR from 1924 to 1993
- WNED-FM, a radio station (94.5 FM) licensed to serve Buffalo, New York, which held the call sign WEBR from 1960 to the mid-1970s
- WNDT-CD, a low-powered television station (channel 17 analog/49 digital) licensed to serve New York City, which held the call sign WEBR from 1997 to 2018
