= WLGZ =

WLGZ may refer to:

- WLGZ-FM, a radio station (102.7 FM) licensed to serve Webster, New York, United States
- WDCX (AM), a radio station (990 AM) licensed to serve Rochester, New York, United States, which used the call sign WLGZ from December 1999 to May 2008
