= WRNY =

WRNY may refer to:

- WRNY (AM), a radio station (1350 AM) licensed to Rome, New York, United States
- WRNY (New York City), a radio/television station that operated in New York City from 1925 to 1934
- WRNY, a defunct radio station (680 AM) that operated in Rochester, New York from 1957 to 1979 (see also WDCX (AM))
