= WBFO =

Public radio station in Buffalo, New York, US

Coordinates: 43.003°N 78.765°W

- Buffalo, New York; United States
- Broadcast area: Buffalo metropolitan area
- Frequency: 88.7 MHz (HD Radio)
- Branding: BTPM NPR

Programming
- Format: Public radio; news-talk
- Subchannels: HD2: BTPM The Bridge (AAA); HD3: Radio Bilingüe (Spanish public radio)
- Affiliations: National Public Radio; Public Radio Exchange; American Public Media; BBC World Service

Ownership
- Owner: Buffalo Toronto Public Media; (Western New York Public Broadcasting Association)
- Sister stations: WNED-TV; WNED-FM

History
- First air date: January 6, 1959
- Call sign meaning: Buffalo

Technical information
- Licensing authority: FCC
- Facility ID: 63113
- Class: B
- ERP: 50,000 watts
- HAAT: 117 meters (384 ft)
- Repeaters: 88.1 WUBJ (Jamestown); 91.3 WOLN (Olean)

Links
- Public license information: Public file; LMS
- Webcast: Listen live; HD3: Listen live (HD3)
- Website: wbfo.org; HD3: radiobilingue.org/en

WBFO (88.7 FM, "BTPM NPR") is a non-commercial, listener-supported, public radio station in Buffalo, New York. It is owned by the Western New York Public Broadcasting Association, doing business as Buffalo Toronto Public Media (BTPM). Along with sister stations 94.5 WNED-FM and channel 17 WNED-TV, it broadcasts from studios in the Lower Terrace section of downtown Buffalo.

WBFO is a Class B station. It has an effective radiated power (ERP) of 50,000 watts. The transmitter is off Millersport Highway (New York State Route 263) in Getzville. Programming is also heard on two satellite stations: WUBJ (88.1 FM) in Jamestown, and WOLN (91.3 FM) in Olean. WBFO broadcasts using HD Radio technology. It plays adult album alternative on its HD2 subchannel and Spanish-language public radio on its HD3 subchannel.

== Programming ==
WBFO is a member station of National Public Radio (NPR). The station airs a news, talk and information format with music programs in the evening. Weekdays begin with NPR's Morning Edition. Also heard on weekdays are All Things Considered, Here and Now, Capitol Pressroom, Fresh Air and Marketplace. The WBFO staff provides local news updates during the day. Monday through Thursday from 10 to 11 a.m., What's Next? is heard, a Buffalo-centered interview and call-in show produced by WBFO. In the evening, WBFO presents The Bridge, an adult album alternative music service that also airs fulltime on WBFO-HD2.

Weekends feature one-hour public radio shows on a variety of topics: The Splendid Table, On The Media, The TED Radio Hour, Planet Money, Radiolab, A Way with Words, Science Friday, This Old House Radio Hour, Travel with Rick Steves, Freakonomics Radio and Wait, Wait, Don't Tell Me. Overnight, the BBC World Service is heard.

WBFO carries a package of high school football and other interscholastic sports on Friday nights, with coverage simulcast on WNED-DT2.

== History ==
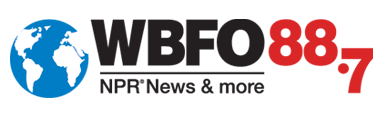
First WBFO logo under WNYPBA ownership, used from 2012 to February 3, 2020

=== Jazz and Blues ===
WBFO signed on the air on January 6, 1959. It was owned and operated by the State University of New York at Buffalo (UB). At first, the station was only powered at 190 watts. For many years, the university operated it as a jazz station most of the day, with a news bureau. WBFO reporter Ira Flatow, a UB graduate, left the station to become part of the inaugural staff of NPR upon its launch in 1971; WBFO carried NPR's initial program All Things Considered and later added Morning Edition in 1979. The rest of the schedule featured local jazz shows in middays, evenings and late nights plus blues music and specialty programming on weekends.

UB was one of two public broadcasting organizations active in Western New York at the time, the other being the Western New York Public Broadcasting Association, whose AM, FM and TV stations all carried the call sign WNED. WNED's AM station, AM 970, had a news and information format that also carried Morning Edition and All Things Considered, along with other public radio shows shared with WBFO. By 2010, UB had eliminated the daytime and much of the evening music programming on 88.7 FM for news shows. At the same time, it discussed a merger with WNED.

=== Switch to News and Information ===
WNED purchased WBFO in July 2011. The new owner incorporated some of the channel's news features and staff into a combined lineup which debuted on March 1, 2012. Once listeners began tuning in WBFO for news and information, Western New York Public Broadcasting could sell 970 AM. On November 30, 2012, 970 WNED was sold to Christian radio owner Crawford Broadcasting. The call letters on 970 changed to WDCZ.

All of the network music programming WBFO had carried on weekends was dropped. WBFO became exclusively a news and information station.). Among the programs eliminated from the old WBFO were the last jazz programs originating from a Buffalo area radio station at that time.

=== Buffalo Toronto Public Media ===
WBFO, along with WNED-FM-TV, began collectively referring to themselves as "Buffalo Toronto Public Media" (BTPM) on February 4, 2020. The rebranding was in part to better identify WBFO and the WNED stations as part of a single organization. It also reflects WNED-TV's significant Canadian viewership and financial support, though cable and satellite carriage. WNED officials told The Buffalo News that the organization's radio stations have minimal listenership in Canada.

WBFO leases an as-yet unutilized satellite studio in Toronto, Canada. Previously, WBFO broadcast from the South campus (a.k.a. Main Street Campus) of the University at Buffalo, The State University of New York.

In April 2025, as part of a move to unify the on-air branding of the organization's stations, WBFO rebranded as BTPM NPR, erasing any reference to the stations' call signs from public branding.

In August 2026, WBFO will absorb the classical music programming from sister station WNED-FM, which is converting to commercial operation as a response to the loss of the Corporation for Public Broadcasting. In the process, WUBJ and WOLN will be broken off from the simulcast and flipped to an all-network format. All Things Considered and Morning Edition will remain on WBFO, as NPR forbade BTPM from placing the programs on a commercial station.

=== Past programming ===
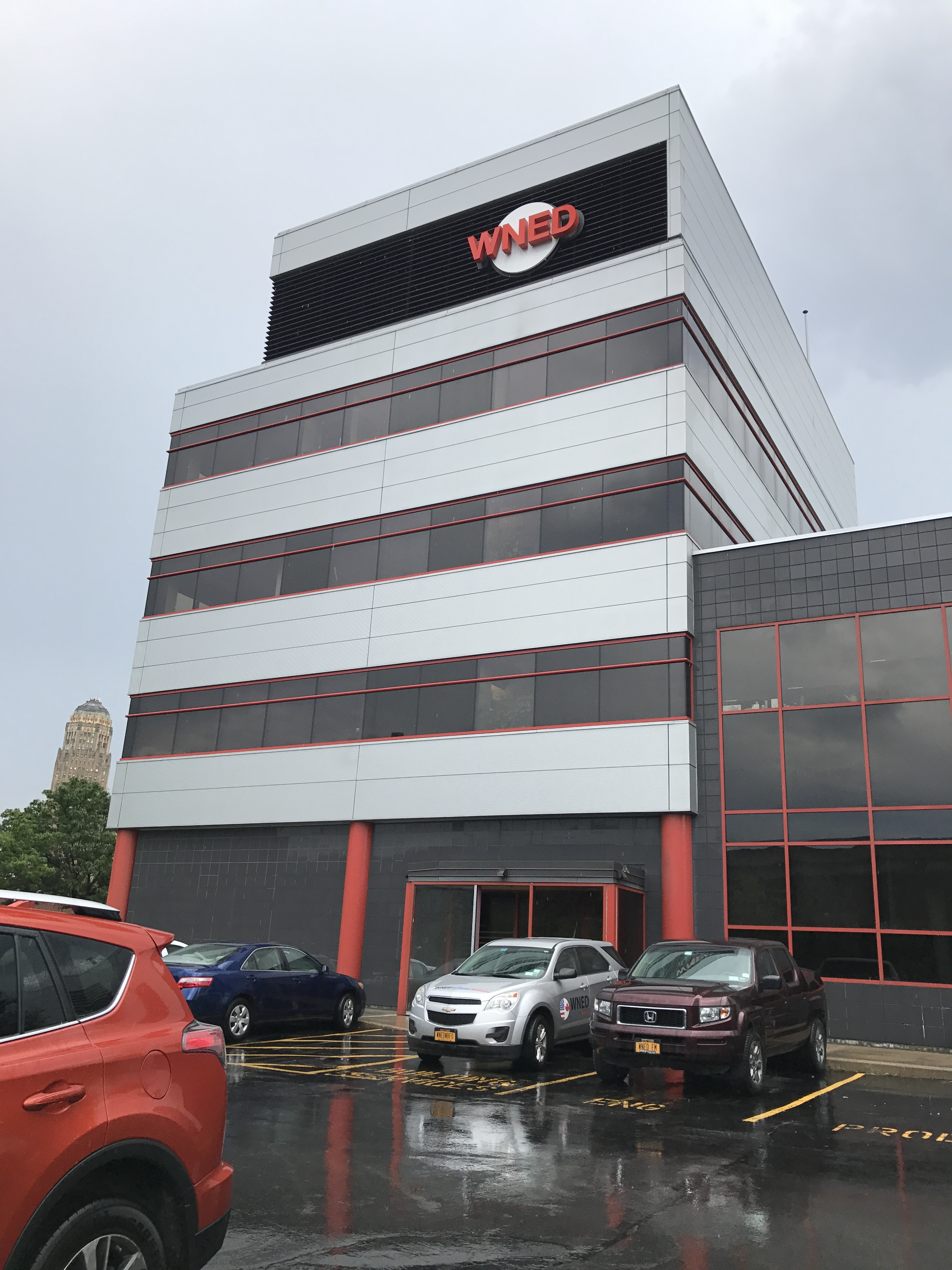
The WNED and WBFO building

Prior to March 2012, WBFO presented a full-service mix of news and music programming that incorporated blues and jazz. WBFO's local news department had been highly recognized by the New York State Associated Press Broadcasters Association. WBFO was all-news and information during the day and featured jazz at night. On weekends there had been a mix of nationally syndicated talk programs (such as Car Talk and Only a Game) on weekend mornings. Weekend music programs included The Thistle & Shamrock, Bebop and Beyond, and Piano Jazz with Marian McPartland in the evenings. Locally originated blues programming was broadcast on Saturday and Sunday afternoons.

A four-hour block of jazz programming during the midday shift was eliminated in 2010, with Fresh Air moving to an earlier time slot and additional talk programming (all network or syndicated) added. The program changes also eliminated an additional two hours of jazz and local music in the evening time slot, pushing the start of jazz programming from 8 p.m. back to 10 p.m., being replaced by replays of programming that had already aired on WBFO earlier in the day.

All remaining local and syndicated music programming on WBFO, with the exception of the weekend afternoon blues blocks which were moved to evenings were eliminated on March 1, 2012, after WNED took over WBFO's operations. The only music programming on either WNED or WBFO were the blues blocks and A Prairie Home Companion, which had previously aired on WNED. (The latter show ended in 2016 with Garrison Keillor's retirement; neither WBFO nor WNED carried the successor program Live from Here, which ran until 2020.)

=== HD Radio programming ===
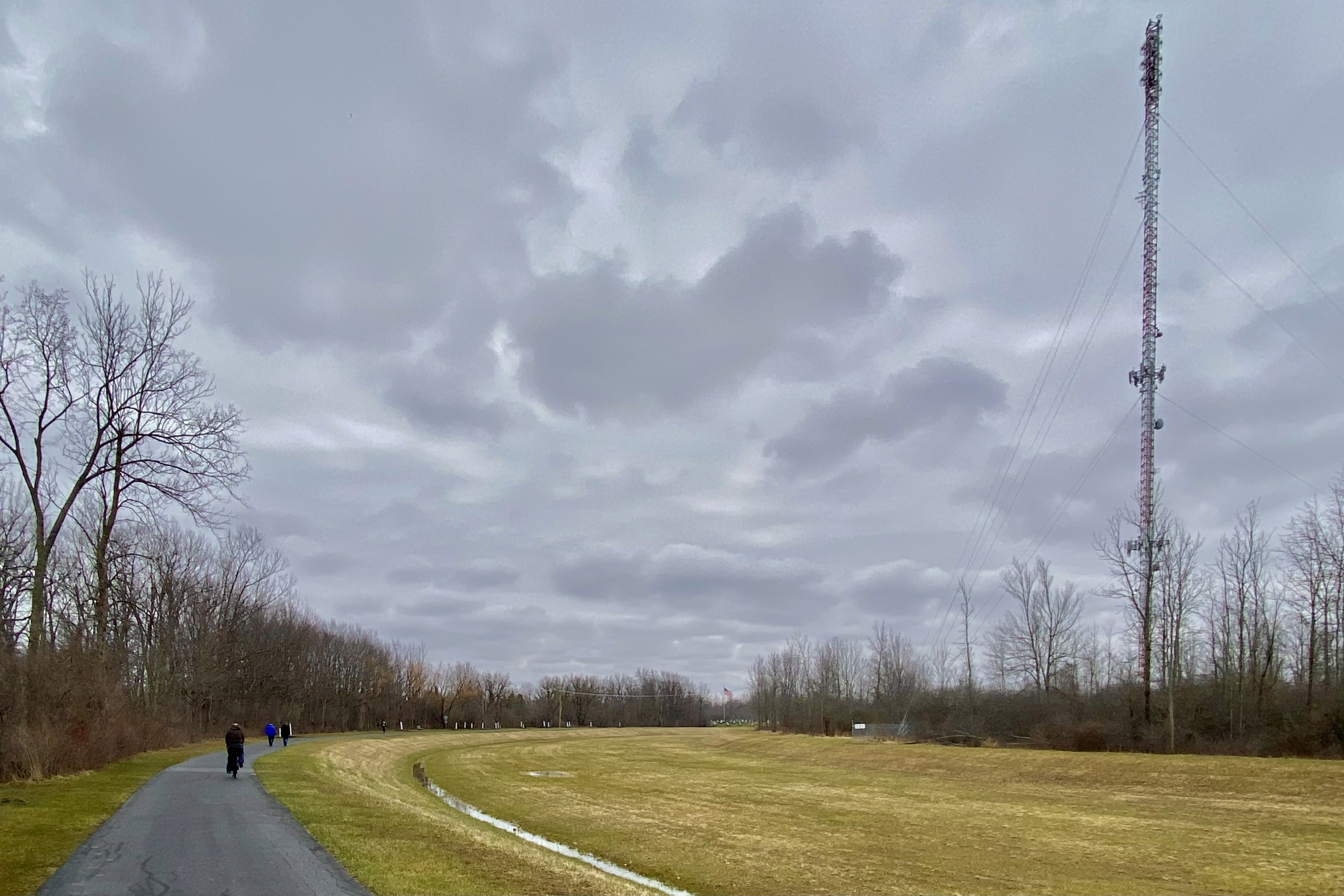
The WBFO transmitter tower in Amherst, New York

A musical satellite feed called "Exponential" had been carried on the HD2 digital subchannel. That was replaced by a satellite-fed jazz service called "JazzWorks". In November 2021, JazzWorks was moved to 94.5 WNED-FM-HD2 to make way for "The Bridge", an adult album alternative format.

A third subchannel, HD3, carried NPR news and information programs at different times than they were heard on the main channel. This was eliminated when "JazzWorks" was added to HD3. On June 23, 2024, WBFO launched a Spanish language public radio format on its HD3 subchannel, branded as "Radio Bilingüe".

== See also ==
- WDCZ
- WNED-FM
