= WLGZ-FM =

- Webster, New York; United States
- Broadcast area: Rochester metropolitan area
- Frequency: 102.7 MHz (HD Radio)
- Branding: Legends 102.7

Programming
- Format: Oldies; classic hits
- Subchannels: HD2: 105.5 The Beat (Urban contemporary)

Ownership
- Owner: DJRO Broadcasting LLC

History
- First air date: September 1992 (as WLMF)
- Former call signs: WLMF (1991–1992); WFUL (1992–1993); WDCZ (1993–1997); WDCZ-FM (1997–2004); WRCI (2004–2008)
- Call sign meaning: "Legends"

Technical information
- Licensing authority: FCC
- Facility ID: 34818
- Class: A
- ERP: 6,000 watts
- HAAT: 100 meters (330 ft)
- Transmitter coordinates: 43°10′14.2″N 77°40′22″W
- Translator: HD2: 105.5 W288CS (Rochester)

Links
- Public license information: Public file; LMS
- Webcast: Listen live; HD2: Listen live
- Website: www.legends1027.com; HD2: thebeat1055.com

WLGZ-FM (102.7 MHz) is a commercial FM radio station licensed to Webster, New York, and serving the Rochester metropolitan area. It broadcasts an oldies/classic hits radio format and is owned by DJRO Broadcasting LLC. The studios and offices are in Rochester's east side. The station first went on the air in 1992 as WLMF.

WLGZ has an effective radiated power (ERP) of 6,000 watts. The transmitter tower is on Ferrano Street in Rochester, near the Erie Canal. WLGZ broadcasts using HD Radio technology. Its digital subchannel broadcasts an urban contemporary format known as "105.5 The Beat". The subchannel feeds a 250 watt FM translator, W288CS at 105.5 MHz.

== History ==
The station was first assigned the call sign WLMF on August 23, 1991; in September 1992, it signed on the air with a temporary simulcast of WNYR-FM, an adult contemporary station in Waterloo, ahead of a planned sale to Crawford Broadcasting. It changed to WFUL on October 30, 1992, and to WDCZ on February 3, 1993. Crawford formally launched WDCZ on February 15, 1993, as a religious station; it partially simulcast its sister station in Buffalo, WDCX. It modified its call sign to WDCZ-FM on August 1, 1997, after Crawford bought WCMF (990 AM) and relaunched it as WDCZ, an AM simulcast of WDCZ-FM. The FM station became WRCI on January 1, 2004.

On February 11, 2008, the station ended its contemporary Christian format as WRCI "102.7 The Light" to make way for "Legends 102.7", a hybrid of oldies and adult standards. The "Legends" format was already featured on WLGZ (990 AM), which after a period of simulcasting WLGZ-FM turned to a Christian talk and teaching format. AM 990 now carries the call letters WDCX, along with much of the programming of WDCX-FM in Buffalo.

WLGZ was purchased by DJRA Broadcasting on January 1, 2010. Following WLGZ's sale from Crawford to DJRA, most adult standards titles were dropped from the station's playlist and WLGZ morphed into a straightforward oldies outlet featuring hits of the 1950s, 1960s and 1970s. The format change for WLGZ has succeeded in increasing the station's audience.

The station's license was assigned to DJRO Broadcasting LLC on June 1, 2012. A noteworthy fact is that this station has not completely discarded songs and artists from the 1960s and early 1970s which are not commonly heard on commercial radio. However, WLGZ has adapted its playlist to feature a greater proportion of songs from the 1980s, as are heard on classic hits outlets.

== HD Radio ==
On September 21, 2017, at 6 p.m., WLGZ-FM launched an urban contemporary format branded as "105.5 The Beat" on its HD2 subchannel, fed on translator W288CS.
