= Newton's Apple =

American educational television series

- Genre: Educational
- Created by: James Steinbach
- Starring: Ira Flatow (1983–1988); David Heil (1988–1999); Peggy Knapp (1987–1996); SuChin Pak (1995–1999); Dave Huddleston (1995–1999); Brian Hackney (1995–1999); Eileen Galindo (1996–1999)
- Opening theme: "Ruckzuck" by Kraftwerk
- Country of origin: United States
- No. of episodes: 195

Production
- Executive producer: Richard Hudson
- Producers: Kristian Berg; Gary Leatherman; Kevin Williams; Leslie Kratz; Liz Schlick; Carrie Maloney; Cori Paulet; Kaye Zusmann; Jeffrey Nielsen; Doug Bolin; Lesley Goldman; Lynne Reeck
- Production locations: KTCA Studios; Saint Paul, Minnesota
- Running time: 30 minutes
- Production company: KTCA

Original release
- Network: PBS (October 15, 1983 – September 5, 1999); PBS Kids (September 6, 1999 – October 31, 1999)
- Release: October 15, 1983 – October 31, 1999

Newton's Apple is an American educational television program produced and developed by KTCA of Minneapolis–Saint Paul, and distributed to PBS stations in the United States that ran from October 15, 1983, to January 3, 1998, with reruns continuing until October 31, 1999. The show's title is based on the legend of Isaac Newton sitting under an apple tree and an apple falling near him—more popularly, on his head—prompting him to ponder what makes things fall, leading to the development of his theory of gravitation (an event often loosely described as him "discovering" gravity). The show was produced by Twin Cities Public Television (TPT). For most of the run, the show's theme song was Ruckzuck by Kraftwerk, later remixed by Absolute Music. Earlier and later episodes of the show featured an original song.

Ira Flatow was the show's first host during the first five seasons and in the 6th season, he was replaced by David Heil, then assistant director of the Oregon Museum of Science and Industry (OMSI). In the 5th season, Peggy Knapp joined the show as a field reporter and later became the co-host in the 13th season. The last three seasons were hosted by the team of Peggy Knapp, Dave Huddleston, Brian Hackney, David Heil and SuChin Pak. In the 14th season, Peggy Knapp left and the show added actress and voiceover artist Eileen Galindo to the cast. An occasional short feature called "Science of the Rich and Famous" featured celebrities explaining a scientific principle or natural or physical phenomenon; for example, rock star Ted Nugent explained guitar feedback, Olympic gold medalist skater Scott Hamilton demonstrated angular momentum in the context of a skater's spin, Monty Hall explained principles of probability, and Betty White showed how cats purr.

Newton's Apple won numerous national awards including the American Association for the Advancement of Science Science Journalism Award, the Parent's Choice Award, and the 1989 Daytime Emmy Award for Outstanding Children's Series.

A segment in the early years, titled "Newton's Lemons," used 1950s-era newsreels of a device that was considered "futuristic" at the time of its introduction but had long since been simply forgotten.

Quick clips from the series were also aired in between programming as "A Bite from Newton's Apple" on many PBS stations.

== Episodes ==
=== Season 1 (1983–1984) ===
- Body is Fat; Fiber Optics; Fainting Chat; Dolphins (October 15, 1983)
- Voiceprints; Curveball; Goosebumps Chat; Hawk (October 22, 1983)
- Astronaut Training; How A Hand Falls Asleep; Clouded Leopard (October 29, 1983)
- Hypnosis; Sky Blue; Seeing Stars Chat; Cold Remedies (November 5, 1983)
- Visual Cliff; Heart; Ears Pop Chat; Wolves (November 12, 1983)
- Video Games; Holograms; Funny Bone Chat; Onions & Tears Chat (November 19, 1983)
- Color Blindness; Taste Buds; Black Hole Chat (November 26, 1983)
- Digital Sound; Eggs; Teeth Chatter Chat; Camel (December 3, 1983)
- Ultrasound; Spacesuit; Knuckles Crack Chat; Porcupine (December 10, 1983)
- Robots; X-Terrestrials; Headaches Chat; Parrots (December 17, 1983)
- Wagon Wheel; Prosthetics; Armadillo (December 24, 1983)
- Police Radar; Voice Synthesis; Skin & Wrinkles Chat; Snake & Lizard (December 31, 1983)
- Karate; Lightning; Tears Chat; Opossum (January 7, 1984)

=== Season 2 (1984–1985) ===
- Mummies; Bicycles; Helium Chat; Owl (October 13, 1984)
- Hot-Air Balloons; Hearing; Side Stitch Chat; Beluga Whales (October 20, 1984)
- Fire; Artificial Heart; Penguins (October 27, 1984)
- Lie Detector; Golf Balls; Hiccup Chat; Cold Remedies (November 3, 1984)
- Imploding Buildings; Snoring; Stomach Growl Chat; Walrus (November 10, 1984)
- Computer Graphics; Smell; Tarantula Chat; Inventors' Fair (November 17, 1984)
- Pain; Optical Illusions; Wine Glass Sing Chat; Iguana (November 24, 1984)
- Electricity; Vision; Tennis Elbow Chat; Bubbles (December 1, 1984)
- Thermography; Voice; Yawn Chat; Pronghorn (December 8, 1984)
- Car Crash; Allergies; Blush Chat; Reindeer (December 15, 1984)
- Sports Clinics; Radioactivity; Acne Chat; Baby Tigers (December 22, 1984)
- Space Shuttle (December 29, 1984)
- Balance; Cooking; Scientists Disagree; Eagle (January 5, 1985)

=== Season 3 (1985–1986) ===
- Earnie; Rainbow; Popcorn Chat; Pygmy Hippo (October 12, 1985)
- Dinosaurs; Bullet Proof Vest; Heartburn Chat; Killer Whales (October 22, 1985)
- Space Shuttle; Rube Goldberg; Crazy Inventions (October 29, 1985)
- Chimp Communication; Bends; Sweating Chat; Cold Remedies (November 2, 1985)
- Boomerangs; Cooking Chemistry; Bears (November 9, 1985)
- Comets; Perpetual Motion; Warts Chat; Sharks (November 16, 1985)
- FBI; Stomach; Llama (November 23, 1985)
- Cancer; Tennis Racquets; Sneezing Chat; Badger (November 30, 1985)
- Punting A Football; Color; Jet Lag Chat; Sea Lions (December 7, 1985)
- Muscles & Bones; Einstein; Falling Stars Chat; Raptor Center (December 14, 1985)
- Earthquakes; Lungs; Bats (December 21, 1985)
- Headaches; Eggs & Equinox; Hot Pepper Chat; Inventors' Fair; Lion (December 28, 1985)
- Singing In The Shower; Calories; Sun Tanning Chat; Patagonian Cavy (January 4, 1986)

=== Season 4 (1986–1987) ===
- Flight Trainers; Snake Bite; Hedgehog Chat; Cold Remedies (October 11, 1986)
- Caves; Lasers; Skin Wrinkle Chat; Whale Birth (October 18, 1986)
- Hypothermia; Moon; Voice Change Chat; Yak (October 25, 1986)
- Sponges; Bed Of Nails; Probability; Pelicans (November 1, 1986)
- Bees; Blood Pressure; Bruises Chat; Hiccups (November 8, 1986)
- Telescopes; Food Myths; Manatee (November 15, 1986)
- Fossil Dig; Mirrors; Frostbite Chat; Elephants (November 22, 1986)
- Wind Blow; Baldness; Soda Pop Fizz Chat; Cranes (November 29, 1986)
- Alcohol; Helium Balloons; Backache Chat; Roller Coaster; Snow Monkeys (December 6, 1986)
- Diabetes; Frozen Food; Flat Feet Chat; Battery Inventions; Alligators (December 13, 1986)
- Immune System; Skiing; Blimp; Beaver (December 20, 1986)
- Pterodactyl; Rube Goldberg; Black Box Chat; Quickies (December 27, 1986)
- Baseball Bats; Polarized Light; Dreams Chat; Inventors' Fair; Falcon (January 3, 1987)

=== Season 5 (1987–1988) ===
- Plastic Surgery; High-Speed Bicycles; "Lemons"; Ailing Whale (October 10, 1987)
- Treasure Diving; Blackboard Chat; "Lemons"; Mothballs & Wintergreen (October 17, 1987)
- Polar Expedition; Inventors' Fair; Sea Otter (October 24, 1987)
- Submarine; Budgies In A Truck; Uvula Chat; Lemons, Sea World Science Day (October 31, 1987)
- Tornado; Exploratorium; Laryngitis Chat; "Lemons"; Beach Science (November 7, 1987)
- Neon Lights; Rube Goldberg; Aspirin Chat; "Lemons"; Puffins (November 14, 1987)
- MRI; Segment Update; Stars Twinkle Chat; "Lemons"; Kitchen Science (November 21, 1987)
- Cavities; Snowflakes; Reflexes Chat; "Lemons"; Arctic Fox (November 28, 1987)
- Cocaine Addiction; Laundry Science; "Lemons"; Sled Dogs (December 5, 1987)
- Child Development; Bridges; "Lemons"; Octopus (December 12, 1987)
- Sailing; Skin Lotion Chat; "Lemons"; Jelly Fish (December 19, 1987)
- Bureau Of Standards; Gravity Contest; Upset Stomach Chat; "Lemons"; Kelp Forest (December 26, 1987)
- Gymnastics; Computer Vision; "Lemons"; Golden Monkeys (January 2, 1988)

=== Season 6 (1988–1989) ===
- Skydiving; Facial Symmetry; "Lemons"; Baby Orangutans (October 15, 1988)
- Movie Creatures; Cholesterol; "Lemons"; Suntan; Vulture (October 22, 1988)
- Microsurgery; Strobes; Coordination Chat; "Lemons"; Aardvark (October 29, 1988)
- Air Traffic Control; Feet; Bell Curves; Tracking Bears (November 5, 1988)
- Clouds; Rube Goldberg; Skin Itch Chat; Home Runs; Cold Remedies (November 12, 1988)
- Woods Hole – Lobster, Cell Division, Research (November 19, 1988)
- Rockets; CPR Chat; Inventors' Fair; "Lemons"; Aerosol Sprays; Cow (November 26, 1988)
- Fireworks; Papermaking; Gas Chat; "Lemons"; Slow Loris (December 3, 1988)
- Insomnia; Electron Microscope; "Lemons"; Exponentials; Giraffe (December 10, 1988)
- Liquid Nitrogen; Dolphins; Superconductivity Chat; "Lemons"; Insects (December 17, 1988)
- Synthesizers; Maple Syruping; Non-Stick Pans; Wind Chill Chat; "Lemons"; Serval (December 24, 1988)
- Magnets; Forest Fires; Night Blindness Chat; Lynx (December 31, 1988)
- Horse Jumping; Toys In Space; Dust Bunnies; Carnivorous Plants; "Lemons"; Toucan (January 7, 1989)

=== Season 7 (1989–1990) ===
- Roller Coaster; Quicksand; Jelly-Side Down; "Lemons"; White Tiger (October 14, 1989)
- Bee Stings; Bowling; High-Speed Elevator; "Lemons"; Boa (October 21, 1989)
- Race Cars; Spider Webs; "Lemons"; Tropical Fish (October 28, 1989)
- Rain Forest; Buoyancy; Pouring Catsup; "Lemons"; Cold Remedies (November 4, 1989)
- Caffeine; Butterfly Migration; Autumn Leaves; "Lemons"; Doppler Effect; Sloth (November 11, 1989)
- Surfing; Geothermal & Volcanoes; Luau; Sugar Processing; Hawaiian Language; Eel (November 18, 1989)
- Whale Watch; Sunspots; "Lemons"; Skunk (November 25, 1989)
- Milky Way; Epilepsy; "Lemons"; Inventors' Fair; Cuttlefish (December 2, 1989)
- DNA; Rube Goldberg Contest; Parrot Chat; Chewing Tin Foil; Seahorse (December 9, 1989)
- Marathons; Celestial Navigation; Cataracts Chat; "Lemons"; Echidna (December 16, 1989)
- Spinal Cord; Glue; "Lemons"; Dog Behavior (December 23, 1989)
- Cheese; Aging; Appendix Chat; Wolves (December 30, 1989)
- Supercomputer; Greenhouse Effect; House Creaking; Owl (January 6, 1990)

=== Season 8 (1990–1991) ===
- Disney Cartoons; Skateboards; Smothers & Yo-Yos; "Lemons"; Turtles (October 13, 1990)
- Juggling; Greenwich; Echoes; Flies (October 20, 1990)
- Everglades; Tomorrow's World; Recycling Chat; Everglades Students (October 27, 1990)
- Demolition Derby; Stress; Topology Chat; Eagles (November 3, 1990)
- Kidney; Steve Allen & Music; "Lemons"; Swans (November 10, 1990)
- Blood; Physics Circus; Faxes; "Lemons"; Pronghorn (November 17, 1990)
- Helicopter; Isaac Newton; "Lemons"; Koala (November 24, 1990)
- Dyes; Billiards; Cheerios; "Lemons"; Cheetah (December 1, 1990)
- Desert Animals; Judo; Salt & Ice; Pigs (December 8, 1990)
- Hydro Power; Whitewater Rafting; Mold; "Lemons"; Weather Proverbs (December 15, 1990)
- Wildlife Census; Eggs; Inventors' Fair; Stone Crabs (December 22, 1990)
- Violins; Voyager; Rube Goldberg; "Lemons"; Kinkaju (December 29, 1990)
- Glaciers; Termites; "Lemons"; Alligators (January 5, 1991)

=== Season 9 (1991–1992) ===
- Aerobic Exercise; Swimming & Weightlifting; Luge & Skating; Softball & Racewalking (October 12, 1991)
- Solar Cars; Steroids; The Amazing Kreskin; How A Foot Falls Asleep; Miniature Horses (October 19, 1991)
- Murder Mystery; Ted Nugent; Bats (October 26, 1991)
- Cancer Causes; Frisbees; Computer Virus (November 2, 1991)
- Sewers; Cancer Treatments; Dick Cavett; Porcupines (November 9, 1991)
- Mapping The Dig Site; Dating The Bones; Assembling A Dinosaur (November 16, 1991)
- Domed Stadium; Photosynthesis; Polarized Sunglasses; Amusement Park (November 23, 1991)
- Tears; Slinky Physics; Bar Codes; Aspirin; Camels (November 30, 1991)
- Soviet Space; Sky Blue; Inventors' Fair; Llamas (December 7, 1991)
- Acid Rain; High Jump; Potholes; Goats (December 14, 1991)
- Medical Quackery; Microwave Ovens; Dollar Changer; Golden Eagles (December 21, 1991)
- Telecommunications; Solar Eclipse; Blimp; Bear Cubs (December 28, 1991)
- Hip Replacement; Airbags; Paper Cuts; Potbelly Pigs (January 4, 1992)

=== Season 10 (1992–1993) ===
- Television; Studio Tour; Post-Production; Satellites (October 10, 1992)
- Movie Stunts; Household Chemistry; Coffee & Cream; Musk Ox (October 17, 1992)
- Election Polls & Surveys; Electric Car; Ceramics; Cougars (October 24, 1992)
- Monster Make-Up; Ozone; Rearview Mirrors; Artificial Sweeteners (October 31, 1992)
- Oil Spill; Diet & Nutrition; Crystal Gayle; Caribou (November 7, 1992)
- Antarctic Journey; Antarctic Penguins; Palmer Station; Krill; Seals (November 14, 1992)
- AIDS; Glass Recycling; Science Challenge; Cement; Wolverine (November 21, 1992)
- Cockroaches; Broken Bones; Dentist Chair; Rhinoceros (November 28, 1992)
- Omnimax Technology; Archery; Lightbulb; Condors (December 5, 1992)
- Aurora Borealis; Air Pressure; Al Gore; Piranha (December 12, 1992)
- Traffic Control; Cryogenics; Static Electricity; Russian Kids (December 19, 1992)
- Blood Typing; Locks & Dams; Moles; Penguins (December 26, 1992)
- Diabetes; Galaxy Mapping; Dweezil Zappa; Ostrich (January 2, 1993)

=== Season 11 (1993–1994) ===
- Rock Climbing; Taste Test; Monty Hall; Baby Bobcats (October 16, 1993)
- Emergency Rescue; Black Holes; Pizza; Reindeer (October 23, 1993)
- Memory; In Vitro Fertilization; Goose Bumps; Hummingbirds (October 30, 1993)
- Newspaper; Bomb Squad; Echoes; Mosquitoes (November 6, 1993)
- Jumbo Jets; Meteors; Knuckle Crack; Paper Recycling (November 13, 1993)
- Windsurfing; Permafrost; Tumbleweeds; Zebras (November 20, 1993)
- Spotted Owls; Carpal Tunnel; Foggy Mirrors; Lizards (November 27, 1993)
- Archaeology; Mazes; Dolphins (December 4, 1993)
- Firefighting; Dairy Farm; Inventors' Fair; Otters (December 11, 1993)
- Bison Roundup; Heart Attack; Dead Fingernails; Chile Peppers (December 18, 1993)
- The Bends; Compact Disc; Michael York; Wolves (December 25, 1993)
- Garbage; Infrared; Shelley Duvall; Polar Bears (January 1, 1994)
- Mt. Rushmore; Virtual Reality; Candles; Chimpanzees (January 8, 1994)

=== Season 12 (1994–1995) ===
- Hang Gliding; Karate; Robin Leach; Elephant (October 15, 1994)
- Sled Dogs; Arctic Travel; Life In Camp; Arctic Weather (October 22, 1994)
- Aircraft Carrier; Brain; Carrier Life (October 29, 1994)
- Brain Mapping; Garlic; Sunscreens; Tasmanian Devil (November 5, 1994)
- Movie Dinosaurs; Bread Chemistry; Scott Hamilton; Wallaby (November 12, 1994)
- Movie Sound Effects; Sun; Globetrotters; Hedgehog (November 19, 1994)
- Dinosaur Extinction; Floods; Blue Seas; Siberian Tiger (November 26, 1994)
- Internet; Antibiotics; Panning For Gold; Taxidermy (December 3, 1994)
- Ethnobotany; Hubble Telescope; Inventors' Fair; Komodo Dragons (December 10, 1994)
- Raptor Hospital; Photography; Skipping Stones; Snakes (December 17, 1994)
- Redwoods; Electricity; Monuments; Red Fox (December 24, 1994)
- Printing Money; Gravity; Nature Labs (December 31, 1994)
- Bridges; Earthquakes; Chroma-Key; Grizzly Bear (January 7, 1995)

=== Season 13 (1995–1996) ===
- Waterskiing; Reflexes; Escalator; Fat-Free Foods (October 14, 1995)
- Circus High Wire; Mummies; Bug Spray; Armadillo (October 21, 1995)
- Maya Bike Trek; Hearing; Parachutes; Owls (October 28, 1995)
- Balloon Safari; Grasslands; Maasai Mara; Mara Animals (November 4, 1995)
- Ice Surfing; DNA Fingerprinting; Bubble Gum; Cold Remedies (November 11, 1995)
- Aircraft Fire Rescue; Balloons; Knives; Science Home Videos (November 18, 1995)
- Simulator Rides; Dolphin Communication; Parade Technology; Laser Show (November 25, 1995)
- Hazardous Materials; In-Line Skating; Skin Wrinkling; Compost (December 2, 1995)
- Human Slingshot Ride; Bone Marrow; King's Singers; Rotting Foods (December 9, 1995)
- Wild Lion Vet; Bicycles; Fish Breathing; Insect Warfare (December 16, 1995)
- Equator; Maasai Village; Coffee; Baby Elephants (December 23, 1995)
- Bird Songs; Ergonomics; Inventors' Fair; Scorpions (December 30, 1995)
- Jungle Survival; Liver; Emus (January 6, 1996)

=== Season 14 (1996–1997) ===
- Spelunking; Human Eye; Betty White; Elk (October 12, 1996)
- Sharks; Tattoo; Black Pearls; Coconuts (October 19, 1996)
- Riverboats; Body Fat-II; Motorcycle Scientists; Parrots (October 26, 1996)
- Hypercoaster; Nicotine; Erasers; Dance Scientists (November 2, 1996)
- Avalanche Rescue; Prosthetic Limbs; Football Scientist; Popcorn (November 9, 1996)
- Inca Engineering; Quipus; Potatoes; Alpacas (November 16, 1996)
- Ski Jump; Bee Stings; Fear; Ruminants (November 23, 1996)
- Rain Forest Researchers; Snakes; Frogs; Leaf-Cutter Ants (November 30, 1996)
- Solar Energy Olympics; Soccer; Trumpets; Earthquake Scientist (December 7, 1996)
- Malaria Tracking; Clocks; Inventors' Fair; Deformed Frogs (December 14, 1996)
- Post Office; Gems; SCI HomeVideo (December 21, 1996)
- Ethanol; Bones; Coyotes (December 28, 1996)
- Wetlands; Eco-Filtration; Drinking Water; Water Tower (January 4, 1997)

=== Season 15 (1997–1998) ===
- Lost World Dinosaurs; Glaucoma; Research Vet; Enzyme Cleaners (October 11, 1997)
- Henrietta Marie; Scuba Kids; Fog; Best Of Inventors'; Fair (October 18, 1997)
- Goldmine; Phases Of The Moon; Craig T. Nelson; Baby Tiger (October 25, 1997)
- Pet Food; The Family Pack; Wishbone; Not-A-Pet; Exotic Pets (November 1, 1997)
- White Water Rafting; Asthma; Meteorologist; Wild Horses (November 8, 1997)
- Gliders; Suction Cups; Novocaine; Leeches (November 15, 1997)
- Wilderness Training; River Kayaking; Glacier Climbing; Summit Bid (November 22, 1997)
- Glass Blowing; Smiles; Richard Dean Anderson; Enviro-Archaeology (November 29, 1997)
- Mammoth Dig; Greenhouse Effect; Neo-Natologist; Palmer Station (December 6, 1997)
- Kids On Mars; Winds Blow; Badlands (December 13, 1997)
- Zoo Vet; Car Engines; Can Opener; Walking Sticks (December 20, 1997)
- 'Bot Or Not; NASA Robots; Mars VR; Robot Camps (December 27, 1997)
- Lightning Bolts; Proteins; Geese; Home Videos (January 3, 1998)

== Home media ==
#	VHS episode title	Release date
1	Newton's Apple – Episode 1	September 26, 1990
2	Newton's Apple – Episode 2	August 7, 1991
3	Artificial Heart	August 7, 1991
4	Boomering Stars Chat	August 7, 1991
5	Mummies Sport Clinic	August 7, 1991
6	Episode 6	August 7, 1991
7	Dinosaurs Bulletproof	August 7, 1991
7	Science Homeschool	August 7, 1991
