= Bob Enyart =

American talk radio host, author, and pastor (1959–2021)

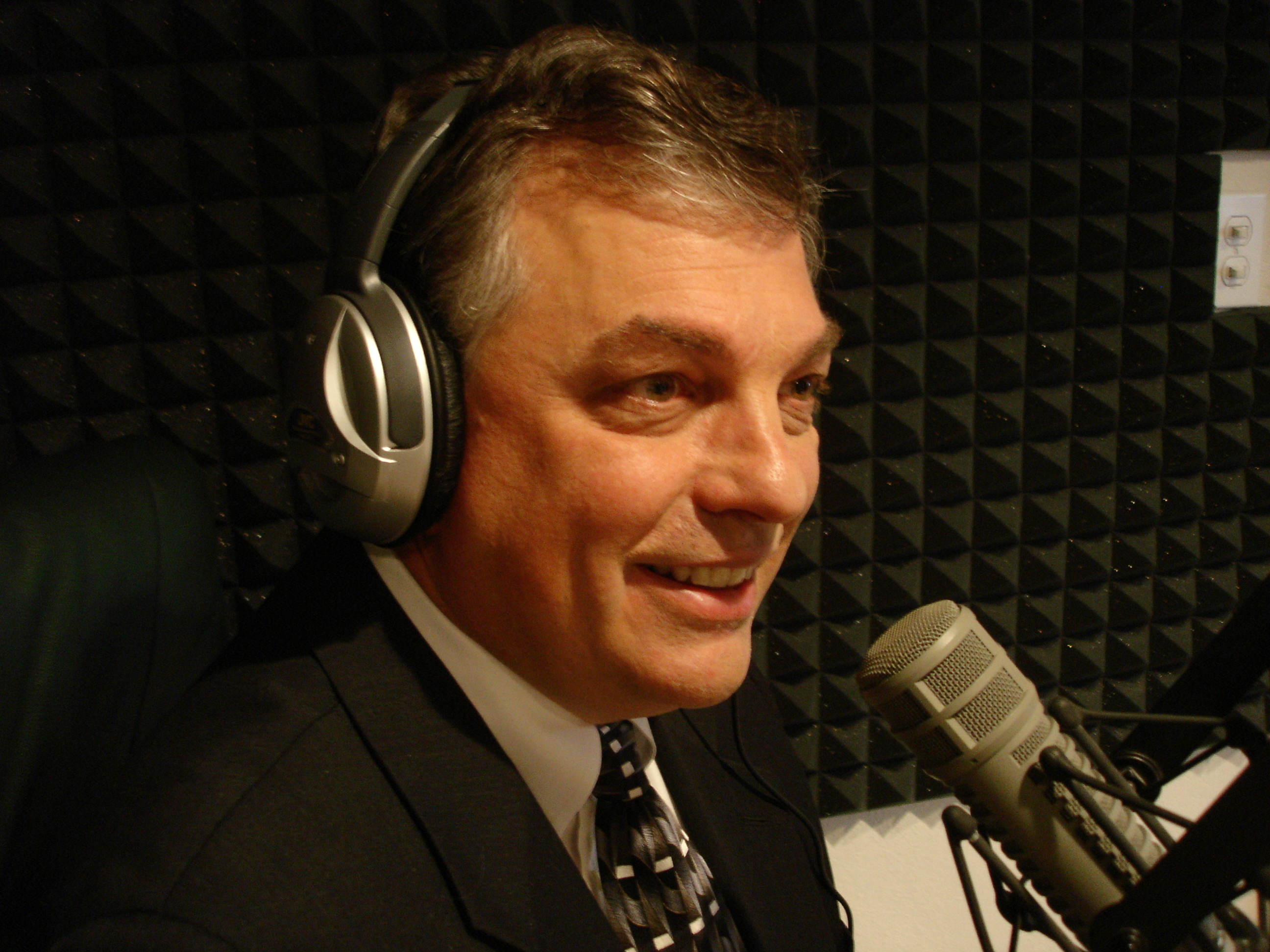

Robert Enyart (January 10, 1959 – September 12, 2021) was an American conservative talk radio host and pastor of Denver Bible Church in Denver, Colorado. He was an anti-abortion advocate and political commentator. Enyart opposed mandated vaccinations and mask mandates for COVID-19. He died of COVID-19 in September 2021.

== Early life and education ==
Enyart was born and raised in Paterson, New Jersey. He attended a Catholic grammar school for eight years before attending a public high school. Enyart studied at Arizona State University at Tempe, where he specialized in computer science.

== Career ==
Before graduating from college, Enyart began working in the technology industry, including positions at McDonnell Douglas and US West in Denver. He designed computer software for military helicopters and served as a computer analyst for Microsoft.

Opposed to legal abortion, Enyart began working for Operation Rescue in 1989; multiple arrests for trespassing, assault and obstruction at women's clinics led to conviction, and Enyart spent time in jail.

In 1991, Enyart began broadcasting about conservative issues at KQXI. With his audience growing, he began broadcasting on Christian television station KWHD-TV, owned by LeSea Broadcasting of South Bend, Indiana.

In 2000, Enyart became pastor at Denver Bible Church.

Enyart hosted Bob Enyart Live, a daily show on Denver-based Christian radio station KLTT and was a host for Cornerstone Television.

In 1991, Enyart created a radio show to support creationism and attack evolution. Enyart changed the name of the show in 2006 to Real Science Friday as a challenge to National Public Radio's show Science Friday. On December 28, 2012, Enyart settled a trademark infringement and cybersquatting lawsuit brought against him by NPR and renamed his show Real Science Radio.

== Activism and views ==
=== Abortion ===
Enyart served as a spokesperson for the anti-abortion group American Right to Life. He picketed the homes of doctors who performed abortions, causing one Colorado town to ban such protests in residential neighborhoods. Enyart criticized presidential candidates who did not share his view on abortion and advocated for the death penalty for women who had abortions.

=== AIDS ===
In 1995, Enyart angered families of people with AIDS when he read a man's obituary on his television show, Bob Enyart Live, calling the deceased a sodomite. A regular feature of the show involved reading obituaries of people who had died from AIDS while playing "Another One Bites the Dust" by Queen, whose lead singer, Freddie Mercury, died in 1991 from complications from AIDS.

=== Corporal punishment ===
Enyart was a proponent of corporal punishment of children. He served a 60-day jail sentence in the Jefferson County Correctional Facility after being convicted of child abuse for hitting a 7-year-old child with a belt so violently that he raised welts and broke the skin of the child.

In 1994, Enyart agreed to stop making late-night telephone calls to residents of Kenosha, Wisconsin, who were upset with the content of his program on a Kenosha television station. The calls prompted Senator Russ Feingold (D-Wis.) to call for a Federal Communications Commission investigation to determine if the talk show host had broken laws.

Enyart was sentenced to 9 days in jail in June 2009 after he refused to pay a fine upon his conviction of criminal trespassing at the Focus on the Family headquarters.

=== O. J. Simpson ===
In 1999, Enyart bought about $16,000 worth of O. J. Simpson memorabilia, which he burned on the steps of the Los Angeles courthouse where Simpson was acquitted, to protest the verdict in the Simpson murder case.

=== Open Theism ===
Enyart was a proponent of the doctrine open theism which rejects several aspects of the classical theism of traditional Christianity. In 2014, he publicly debated the issue with Reformed Baptist apologist James R. White.

=== COVID-19 ===
Following a lawsuit brought by Enyart, a U.S. District Court judge ruled in October 2020 that the state could not impose mask-wearing mandates or limits on the size of gatherings at Denver Bible Church.

Enyart supported the debunked theory that COVID-19 vaccinations had been tested on aborted fetuses. He remained unvaccinated until his death from COVID.

== Personal life and death ==
Enyart married Krista Johnson in 1982. The couple had two children, Josiah and Nathanial, before divorcing in 1989 as a result of his extra-marital affairs.

After a brief second marriage, Enyart married Cheryl Mayns in 1994. In 1999, he served a 60-day jail sentence after being convicted of child abuse for hitting her 7-year-old child with a belt so violently that he raised welts and broke the skin of the child.

In August 2021, Enyart announced that he had contracted COVID-19. He died from the virus on September 12, 2021, at the age of 62.
