= Talk of the Nation =

American talk radio program

- Genre: News, interview, call-in
- Running time: 120 min
- Country of origin: United States
- Language: English
- Syndicates: NPR
- Hosted by: John Hockenberry (1991–1993); Ray Suarez (1993–2000); Juan Williams (2000–2001); Neal Conan (2001–2013); Ira Flatow (Science Friday) (1991–2013)
- Executive producers: Leith Bishop, Sue Goodwin
- Original release: November 1991 – June 27, 2013
- Website: npr.org/programs/totn/
- Podcast: podcast

Talk of the Nation (TOTN) is an American talk radio program based in Washington D.C., produced by National Public Radio (NPR) that was broadcast nationally from 2 to 4 p.m. Eastern Time. It focused on current events and controversial issues.

The show began broadcasting in November 1991. It was hosted by Neal Conan from late 2001 to June 27, 2013, the program's last day on air. Each episode featured guests discussing current affairs. Past regular hosts have included John Hockenberry, Ray Suarez, and Juan Williams. On Fridays Ira Flatow hosted Science Friday, with discussion topics from science and technology. The program invited listeners to pose questions for the guest host or hosts by telephone or e-mail.

On March 29, 2013, NPR announced that it would cease production of TOTN at the end of June, replacing it with an expanded version of Here and Now, an NPR/WBUR-FM co-production. According to The New York Times, despite high listenership, NPR member stations wanted to air a straight news program in that timeslot.

Science Friday continued as an independent show.

== Format ==
TOTN began with a look ahead to the upcoming topics. Then the regular five-minute NPR newscast occurred. After the newscast, the show generally spent from 30 minutes to the entire show discussing the main topic. If discussion on that topic petered, or if the guests had to leave, then shorter news interviews similar to those found on the NPR news-magazines of five to ten minutes aired. Sometimes these shorter segments took calls, but often they did not. More controversial issues may have had guests and take calls the entire hour.

One hour's topics did not carry into the next hour. This is because many stations carried only one hour of the program. In addition, the host delivered a concluding "This is Talk of the Nation from NPR News" as a cue to stations that wish to cut away to local programming before the scheduled break.

To coordinate the choice of interviewees across all NPR programs such as Morning Edition, All Things Considered, and Tell Me More, NPR set up a "dibs list" system around 2005, whereby the first show to declare interest in a particular guest can "reserve" that person.

== Hosts ==
Hosts included John Hockenberry (1991–1992), Ray Suarez (1993–1999), Juan Williams (2000–2001), and Neal Conan (2001–2013). Ira Flatow served as host of Science Friday since 1991.

Guest hosts on the show included: Alison Stewart, Ira Glass, Mary Louise Kelly, John Donvan, and Tony Cox.

From 2001 to 2013, TOTN had only two executive producers: Leith Bishop, and more recently, Sue Goodwin.

== Audience ==
In September 2010, Talk of the Nation was aired on 328 public radio stations, and had a weekly audience of 3.2 million and an AQH share of 605,700.

As of March 2013, TOTN was airing on 407 stations to what host Neal Conan said was "the largest audience in the program's history". In the final segment of the show's final episode, Conan noted the program had an audience of "more than 3.6 million ... each week. That puts Talk of the Nation in the top 10 of all talk shows in the country."

== Cancellation ==
On March 29, 2013, NPR and WBUR announced that Talk of the Nation would cease production and that NPR would replace it with a two-hour version of Here and Now.

According to NPR executives, "the unusual move ... to replace Talk of the Nation with WBUR's Here & Now, which is carried by not even half as many stations across the country, is partly in response to long-voiced demands by member stations calling for more robust news coverage during the workday. The number of public radio listeners sags markedly between Morning Edition and All Things Considered." Partnering with WBUR to expand Here and Now is considered a "more pragmatic approach to expanding [mid-day] news coverage" than Day to Day (2003–2009), an earlier NPR attempt at such a program, which had been produced in collaboration with Slate.

The final broadcast of the program was on June 27, 2013.
