= ThinkBright =

Public television channel in New York state

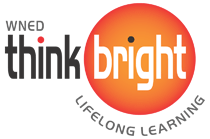
- Type: Educational television, public affairs, arts and culture
- Country: United States
- Availability: OTA digital television in New York
- Founded: 2001 in Buffalo
- Owner: WNED-TV (Western New York Public Broadcasting Association)
- Launch date: 2007 statewide
- Dissolved: 2011 statewide
- Official website: http://www.wned.org/thinkbright

ThinkBright TV was a PBS television digital subchannel serving New York outside of New York City. Its programming included educational series, lifelong learning, arts and culture, children's shows and public affairs coverage with a focus on New York's people, places and heritage.

== History ==
ThinkBright & Well began as ThinkBright Lifelong Learning. ThinkBright Lifelong Learning included a television channel and an online service that supported and enhanced the educational experiences of teachers, students, families, and adult learners throughout New York State.

Started in July 2002 with a $2.5 million grant from The John R. Oishei Foundation, WNED began to harness digital technology to create a lifelong learning educational service. On Oct. 1, 2007, the service expanded to include all of upstate New York. New York State viewers can tune into a whole new selection of public broadcasting programs, including educational series, arts and cultural specials, public affairs forums and high-quality children's shows through ThinkBright. Programs that highlight New York State issues, people, places and heritage will also be featured. Via a statewide network feed from ThinkBright's originating station, WNED in Buffalo.

At one point, ThinkBright programming was available for twelve hours a day on all New York PBS member stations except for those serving the New York City area. As stations such as WCFE-TV, WCNY-TV and WXXI-TV left ThinkBright, the regional network was reduced to a handful of participating digital member stations.

- WPBS-DT 16.2 Watertown / WNPI-DT 18.2 Norwood (Potsdam)
- WMHT 17.2 Schenectady (Troy-Albany)
- WNED-TV 17.3 Buffalo and Western NY
- WSKG-TV 46.3 Binghamton / WSKA 30.3 Corning-Elmira

In most markets, it occupied these subchannels for twelve hours per day, with the remaining timeslots allocated to other programming sources such as Create.

== Closure ==
In 2011, ThinkBright suspended formal operations as a statewide network, and both the originating station WNED and most of the affiliates affiliated with the World network (informally known as PBS World) for their former ThinkBright dayparts.

The "ThinkBright" brand was revived in 2016, co-branded with Create only on WNED.

== See also ==
- WNED-TV (Western New York Public Broadcasting Association)
