= Ira Flatow =

American journalist, science radio host (born 1949)

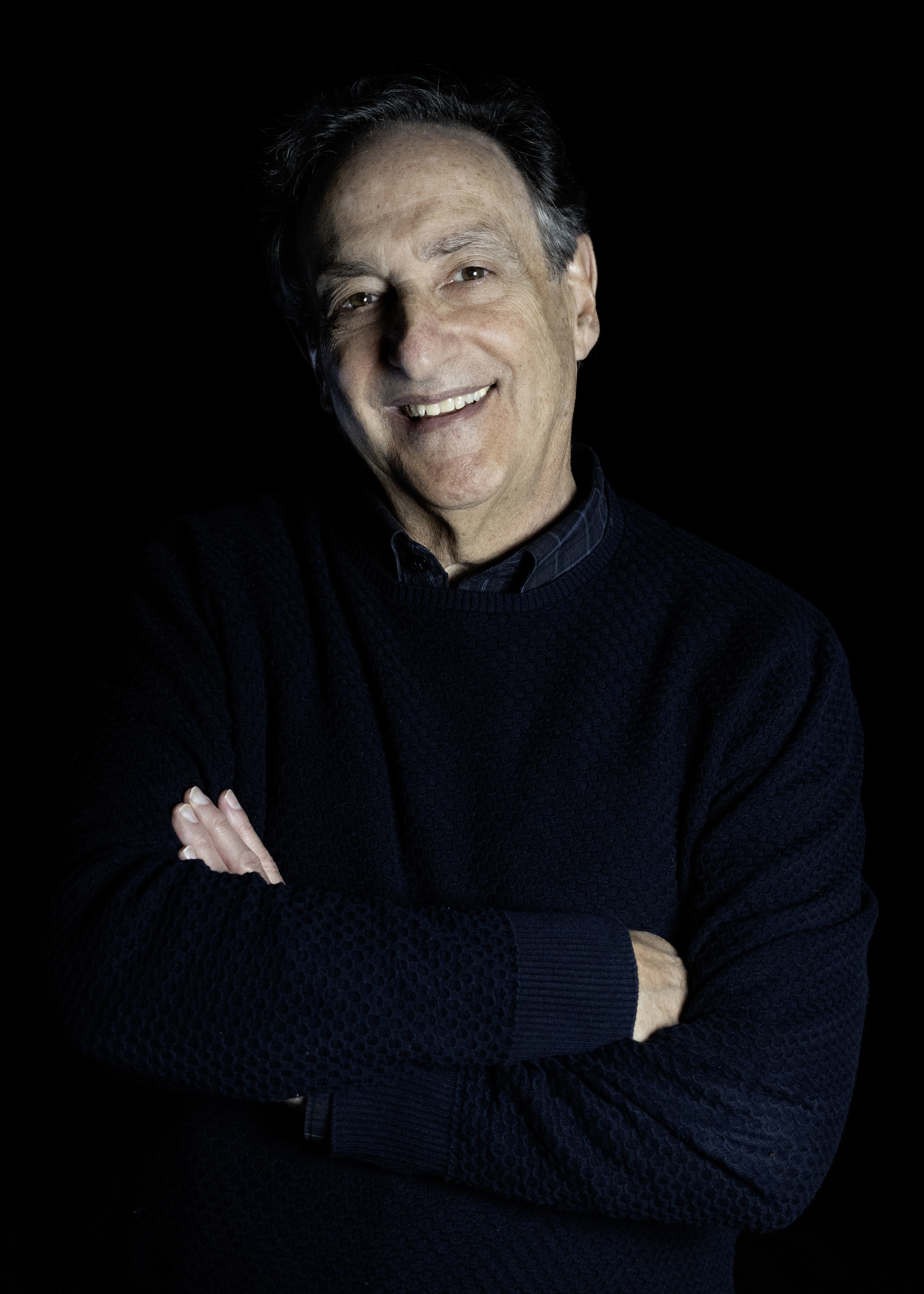
- Flatow at KQED in 2025
- Born: March 7, 1949 (age 77); New York City, United States
- Education: State University of New York at Buffalo (BS)
- Spouse: Miriam Flatow (m. 1983)
- Children: 3
- Presenting career
- Show: Science Friday
- Network: WNYC Studios
- Time slot: Friday, Podcasts, On demand
- Style: Host, executive producer
- Country: United States
- Previous show: Newton's Apple

Ira Flatow (/ˈfleɪtoʊ/;) is an American radio, television, web journalist, and author who hosts WNYC Studio's program Science Friday. On TV, he hosted the PBS children's science series Newton's Apple, a television science program for children and their families which won a Daytime Emmy Award. Later he hosted another PBS series, Big Ideas. He has published several books, the most recent titled Present at the Future: From Evolution to Nanotechnology, Candid and Controversial Conversations on Science and Nature.

== Personal life ==
Flatow is a native of New York and currently lives in Connecticut. He has been married to Miriam Flatow (née Wagenberg) since 1983 and has three children.

== Education ==
Flatow graduated from State University of New York at Buffalo with a BS in engineering.

== Career ==
=== High School Television ===
Flatow's career in broadcasting spans 7 decades. In 1966, Flatow began his career in broadcasting working in high school television at KHD-21 TV at H. Frank Carey High School in Franklin Square, New York. Working in the school's TV studio, he operated a camera and helped broadcast recorded TV content to 5 other high schools in the district.

=== Early Public Radio: WBFO,Buffalo ===
Flatow began working in radio at WBFO, in Buffalo, New York, first as a reporter covering Vietnam anti-war demonstrations and riots, city council meetings and general assignments. He finished as news director. During this time, he was working on an engineering degree at the State University of New York at Buffalo. Flatow's first science stories were created in 1970 during the first Earth Day.

=== National Public Radio ===
From 1971 to 1986, he was on staff at NPR serving as a production assistant, associate producer, producer and science correspondent and reported on topics including the Kennedy Space Center, Three Mile Island, HIV/AIDS and the South Pole. From 1991 to 2013 he hosted Science Friday for NPR, which he anchored each Friday afternoon, discussing topics in science and technology.

=== PRI, Public Radio International ===
On January 1, 2014, the Science Friday program moved from NPR to PRI (Public Radio International) with Flatow continuing as host.

=== WNYC Studios ===
On April 11, 2018, distribution of Science Friday changed hands once more when it went from PRI to WNYC Studios.

=== Television ===
From 1982 through 1987 he hosted the Emmy Award-winning PBS science program Newton's Apple, which originated at KTCA in St. Paul, Minnesota. In 1991, Flatow wrote and reported science and technology for CBS News' CBS This Morning. He has discussed scientific topics on programs such as the Cablevision program Maximum Science. He hosted the PBS series Big Ideas produced by WNET. His TV credits include science reporter for CBS This Morning, Westinghouse, and cable's CNBC. Flatow wrote, produced and hosted an hour-long documentary about the history of the transistor called Transistorized!, which aired on PBS. He has talked about science on a number TV shows including The Merv Griffin Show, Today, Charlie Rose, and The Oprah Winfrey Show. He has authored three books on science and technology: Rainbows, Curveballs, and Other Wonders of the Natural World Explained; They All Laughed... From Light Bulbs to Lasers: The Fascinating Stories Behind the Great Inventions That Have Changed Our Lives; and Present at the Future: From Evolution to Nanotechnology, Candid and Controversial Conversations on Science and Nature.

Flatow is founder and president of the Science Friday Initiative (previously TalkingScience) a nonprofit organization producing radio, television, and online science content

In 2009, Flatow had a voice cameo appearance as himself on the CBS sitcom The Big Bang Theory in "The Vengeance Formulation" (season 3, episode 9). In the episode, Flatow interviews Dr. Sheldon Cooper (Jim Parsons) on his research on magnetic monopoles. Flatow was given a co-star credit.

In 2013, Flatow appears as himself, on the set at Warner Brothers Studios, for another guest-star appearance on The Big Bang Theory, interviewing Dr. Sheldon Cooper and Dr. Leonard Hofstadter on Science Friday about Cooper's failed discovery in "The Discovery Dissipation" (season 7, episode 10).

In 2017, Flatow once again appeared on The Big Bang Theory interviewing Leonard Hofstadter for "Science Friday" (Season 11, Episode 2). He was given a credit as Co-star.

In 2014, Flatow settled a dispute with the federal government over a federal grant from the National Science Foundation. Flatow did not admit any wrongdoing and he and his company settled with the government for a fee of about $146,000. Flatow and ScienceFriday, Inc., were barred from future federal grants for one year, ending in 2015.

== Honors and awards ==
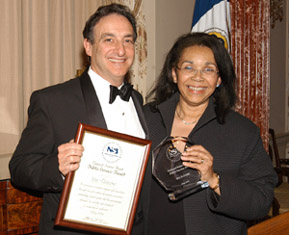
Ira Flatow receiving the National Science Board Public Service Award in 2005

- Doctor of Humanities, SUNY Buffalo (honorary 2014)
- Distinguished Visiting Fellow, University of California, Santa Barbara (2014)
- Doctor of Science Education, Muhlenberg College (honorary 2013)
- American Humanist Association's Isaac Asimov Science Award (2012)
- Nierenberg Prize for Science in the Public Interest (2010)
- Member Connecticut Academy of Science and Engineering
- American Institute of Biological Sciences President's Citation Award (2008)
- National Science Teachers Association Faraday Science Communicator Award (2007)
- Alan Houghton Award, Harlem Children Society (2006)
- National Science Board, Public Service Award (2005)
- National Technology Leadership Excellence Award (2003)
- E.A. Wood Science Writing Award (2002)
- AAAS-Science Journalism Award - Television (2000)
- Carl Sagan Award for Public Appreciation of Science, Council of Scientific Society Presidents (1999)
- Women in Communications Matrix Award (1992)
- AAAS-Westinghouse Science Journalism Award - Radio (1983)
- AAAS-Westinghouse Science Journalism Award - Television (1983)
- National Association of Science Writers Science In Society Journalism Award (1981)
- Ohio State Award (1981)
- Bronze Cindy Award, Information Film Producers of America (1980)
- American Psychological Foundation National Media Award (1977)
- Second Prize: Physics, Science Fair; H.Frank Carey High School (1965)

== Bibliography ==
- Flatow, Ira; Coale, Howard (1988). Rainbows, Curveballs, and Other Wonders of the Natural World Explained. New York: William Morrow & Co. ISBN 0-688-06705-0.
- Flatow, Ira (1992). They All Laughed... From Light Bulbs to Lasers: The Fascinating Stories Behind the Great Inventions That Have Changed Our Lives. New York: HarperCollins. ISBN 0-06-016445-X.
- Flatow, Ira (2007). Present at the Future: From Evolution to Nanotechnology, Candid and Controversial Conversations on Science and Nature. New York: HarperCollins. ISBN 978-0-06-073264-6.
- Flatow, Ira (2019). Ira: Science Fair Winner. StoryBook Genius,LLC. ISBN 978-1949522365.
