= WNED-TV =

Television station in Buffalo, New York

- Buffalo, New York; Toronto, Ontario; United States–Canada
- City: Buffalo, New York
- Channels: Digital: 31 (UHF); Virtual: 17
- Branding: BTPM PBS

Programming
- Affiliations: 17.1: PBS; for others, see § Subchannels

Ownership
- Owner: Buffalo Toronto Public Media; (Western NY Public Broadcasting Association)
- Sister stations: WBFO; WNED-FM

History
- First air date: March 30, 1959
- Former channel numbers: Analog: 17 (UHF, 1959–2009); Digital: 43 (UHF, until 2020)
- Former affiliations: NET (1959–1970)
- Call sign meaning: Western New York Educational Television

Technical information
- Licensing authority: FCC
- Facility ID: 71928
- ERP: 175 kW
- HAAT: 332 m (1,089 ft)
- Transmitter coordinates: 43°1′48.2″N 78°55′14.1″W

Links
- Public license information: Public file; LMS
- Website: www.btpm.org/watch/pbs

WNED-TV (channel 17), branded as BTPM PBS, is a PBS member television station in Buffalo, New York, United States. It is owned by the Western New York Public Broadcasting Association (doing business as Buffalo Toronto Public Media) alongside NPR member WBFO (88.7 FM) and classical music radio station WNED-FM (94.5). The three stations share studios in Horizons Plaza at 140 Lower Terrace in downtown Buffalo; WNED-TV's transmitter is located in Grand Island, New York.

The station services both the Buffalo–Niagara Falls metropolitan area and the Greater Toronto Area of Canada.

== History ==
=== Prior use of channel 17 in Buffalo ===
Channel 17 first went on the air on August 17, 1953, as commercial station WBUF-TV. It was Buffalo's second commercial station after WBEN-TV (channel 4). It was one of two UHF stations to launch in Buffalo in 1953; the other, WBES-TV channel 59, signed on a month after WBUF-TV but had failed by December. WBUF-TV's founder, Sherwin Grossman, had initially planned on establishing a television station in Jamestown, which still has no commercial television service of its own, but was convinced that Buffalo's much larger size made it worthwhile to launch a UHF station there rather than to have a monopoly in what would have been one of the smallest media markets in the United States. (Bud Paxson would eventually make an attempt at serving the Jamestown market with his WNYP station in the late 1960s.)

Initially locally owned, the station was mostly an affiliate of ABC and DuMont, but it also aired CBS programs. WGR-TV (channel 2, now WGRZ) signed on in August 1954; it became the NBC affiliate for Buffalo, and WBEN-TV took CBS. Unable to compete with two strong VHF stations and with their proposal to add another VHF channel to the city unheard, the original owners of channel 17 took their station dark in February 1955. From startup to December 31, 1954, WBUF-TV had made a net loss of $236,324.42 (equivalent to $2.24 million in 2025 dollars).

Less than a month later, NBC announced that it would purchase channel 17, partly as an experiment to see if a UHF station could compete with VHF stations given sufficient signal strength, marketing promotion, and investments in both programming and technical facilities. The network also hoped to expand its presence in major markets beyond the five stations where the Federal Communications Commission (FCC) allowed any network or group owner to operate full-power VHF outlets, a limit NBC had reached by 1949. A revision of the FCC's ownership policy in 1954 created openings for additional ownership of two UHF outlets, and NBC became the first network to own the full complement of seven.

NBC expanded WBUF's transmitter power considerably—ultimately, to 1 million watts—to improve its signal strength and range and built a new studio and transmitter complex on Buffalo's north side to provide service capabilities to match market-leading WBEN-TV and fast-rising WGR-TV, which took the ABC affiliation when NBC moved its programming to channel 17 in August 1956. However, despite a large investment and even a high rate of set conversions to receive UHF stations, WBUF never made much headway against WBEN-TV and WGR-TV; ratings for NBC were lower than in comparable markets, and the station lost money. After more than two years, and with a third VHF station looming, NBC opted to shutter WBUF on September 30, 1958; its programming returned to WGR-TV.

=== WNED-TV ===
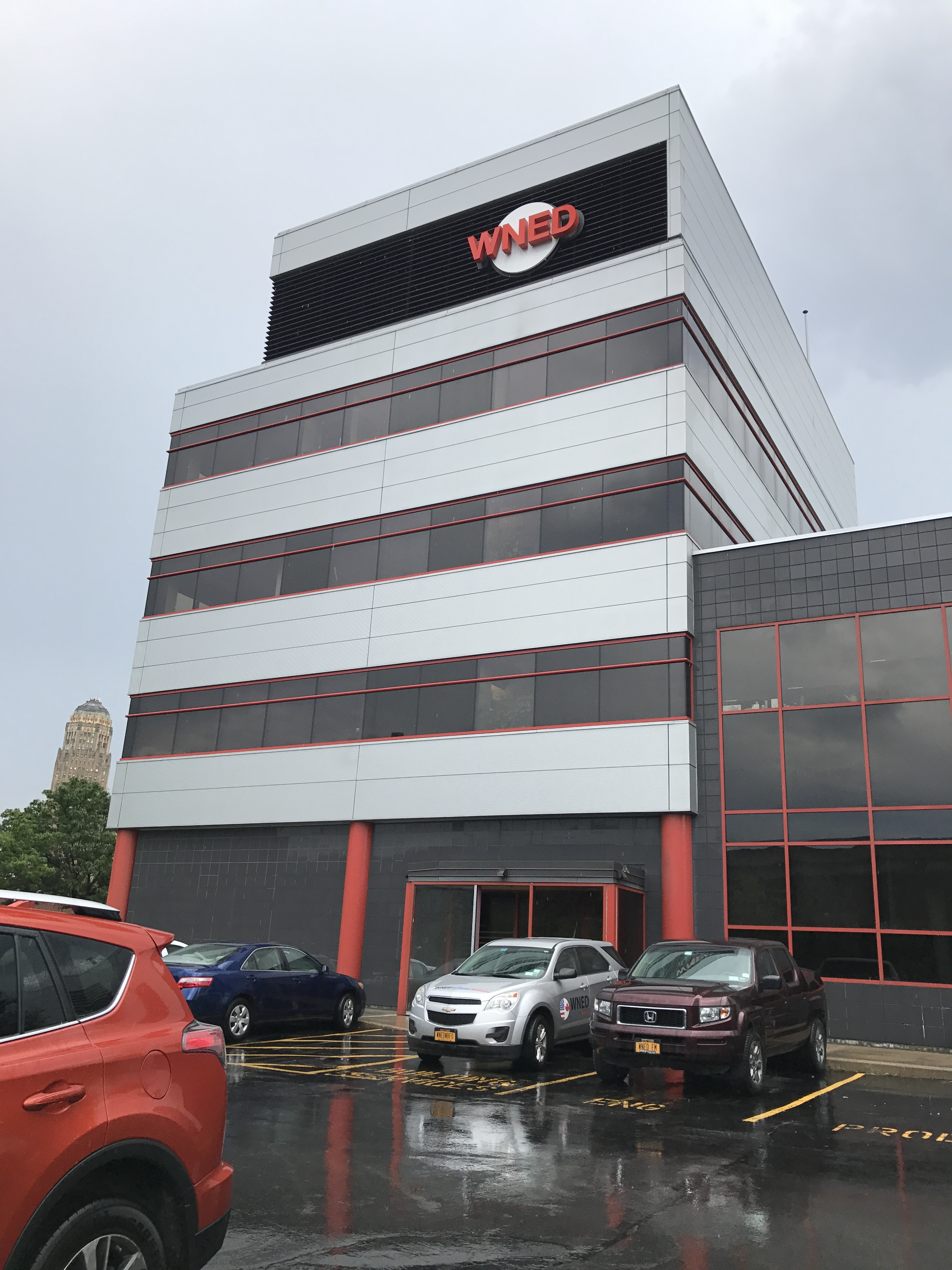
The WNED and WBFO building

In Buffalo, NBC left behind a substantial physical plant as well as channel 17 transmission equipment. The WBUF studio building was acquired by WBEN, which moved its radio and television stations there and from which WIVB-TV, the former WBEN-TV, still operates.

In February 1959, a consortium of educational leaders organized as the Western New York Educational Television Association applied for a new construction permit for the station, having secured the temporary use of equipment of both stations at Elmwood and the long-term use of soon-to-be-vacated WGR facilities in the Hotel Lafayette, as well as a pledge for $115,000 (equivalent to $970,092 in 2025 dollars) in equipment from NBC. The FCC granted the group a construction permit on March 4, and WNED-TV began broadcasting on March 30, making it the first educational TV station in the state of New York. It broadcast from the former WBUF-TV antenna, which was moved to the Hotel Lafayette that summer, in quarters previously used by WGR radio. Its first general manager was Leslie C. Martin Jr., who held the position from 1959 to 1966.

In 1975, the Western New York Public Broadcasting Association bought two commercial radio stations, WEBR (AM) and WREZ (FM). The AM station had been founded in 1924, while the FM station was founded as WEBR-FM in 1960, becoming WBCE in the early 1970s before becoming WREZ. The FM station was renamed WNED-FM in 1977, when it adopted a classical music format. In 1977, WEBR became the nation's first public all-news radio station and was the top-rated public radio station in the country by 1978. In 1993, it was renamed WNED (AM) after cutbacks in government funding forced it to dramatically cut its local programming in favor of network and syndicated content. The AM station was sold off to a religious broadcaster in 2012 (who renamed it WDCZ) when the Western New York Public Broadcasting Association bought Buffalo's other full NPR member, WBFO, and moved most of WNED radio's programming there.

On May 23, 1987, WNED-TV signed on a sister station, WNEQ-TV, on UHF channel 23. However, WNEQ failed to gain approval to from the Canadian Radio-television and Telecommunications Commission (CRTC) to be carried on basic cable in southern Ontario, denying it access to potential viewers and donors, and both stations struggled financially. It soon became apparent that Buffalo was not big enough to support two public television stations. As a result, the Western New York Public Broadcasting Association put WNEQ-TV up for sale; it then announced the sale of WNEQ-TV to LIN Broadcasting (owner of WIVB-TV) in late 1999.

Until this time, WNED-TV had maintained the old commercial license it had inherited from WBUF-TV, while WNEQ-TV had operated on a traditional non-commercial license. LIN needed WNED-TV's commercial license in order to make its acquisition viable. At one point, it seemed likely that LIN would actually purchase channel 17 from the Western New York Public Broadcasting Association. This would have resulted in the WNED-TV intellectual unit moving to channel 23 (which would have made WNEQ-TV the area's primary PBS station), while channel 17 would have become a commercial station. However, the long history of channel 17 as a PBS member station made this an undesirable option for the public broadcaster due to concerns that having WNEQ-TV become the market's sole PBS outlet would cause viewer confusion and potentially reduce the amount of donations that the station would receive. As well, WNED-TV was carried on the basic cable tier of cable systems in the Golden Horseshoe and particularly Toronto, a major source of donations during the channel's fundraising drives, while WNEQ-TV had been repeatedly denied permission by the CRTC to be carried on basic cable in Toronto, meaning the public broadcaster risked losing access to a major source of its revenue if it abandoned channel 17.

The FCC was persuaded to allow channel 17 and channel 23 to swap licenses, allowing WNEQ-TV to be sold to LIN. After 42 years of being a commercial licensee operating as a non-commercial broadcaster, WNED-TV received an educational license in 2000. WNEQ-TV was sold to LIN in early 2001; that station is now WNLO and operates as the market's CW affiliate.

Through the use of a digital subchannel, WNED-TV began providing ThinkBright as a second programming service in the late 2000s, covering most of New York State with 12 hours a day of regional, educational and cultural programming. It was available on all New York PBS member stations except Long Island/New York City. ThinkBright later became ThinkBright and Well, and was discontinued in 2011 to merge with World.

Over time, WNED-TV has become a leading PBS member station. It produced several original programs that have been carried throughout the PBS network and its member stations such as the Mark Russell comedy specials and Reading Rainbow, produced in association with Great Plains National until early 2006. Starting in May 2006, co-production of Reading Rainbow continued with Educate Inc. of Baltimore, Maryland, after the University of Nebraska Regents (the owners of GPN) sold its long-time production interest to WNED-TV. This sale involved the station as petitioners in legal action against long-time Reading Rainbow host LeVar Burton.

On February 4, 2020, the Western New York Public Broadcasting Association adopted the trade name "Buffalo Toronto Public Media" (BTPM) to encompass WNED-TV and sister radio stations WBFO and WNED-FM; CEO Donald K. Boswell believed that many listeners were not aware that WBFO and WNED-FM were part of the same organization, while the new branding also reflects WNED-TV's significant Canadian viewership and financial support. As part of the changes, WNED-TV rebranded as "WNED PBS" to adopt the new PBS national brand identity. In April 2025, WNED-TV rebranded as "BTPM PBS", as part of a move to adopt "BTPM" as an on-air branding.

== Translator network ==
WNED-TV was simulcast on many translators covering the Southern Tier of Western New York for several decades. Because of inadequate signal coverage to rural schools in the valley areas of mountainous southwestern New York State, WNED-TV once had a massive network of translator licenses – in some cases even "extra-legal." The transmitters and towers belonged to the Chautauqua Board of Cooperative Educational Services, the experimental Appalachian Television Project, and Cattaraugus Area Television System (CATS) group and were scattered across numerous small towns in Chautauqua, Cattaraugus and Allegany counties. The network predates the FCC's discontinuation of channels 70 to 83, since some of the Cattaraugus County licenses were in that range.

In addition, the CATS system originated some of its own local programming, such as live high school football games (this was possible mainly because one of the licenses, W26AA, was also a former commercial independent station, that of former CTV affiliate WNYP, whose license was still active; eventually that station was spun off to a religious broadcaster and became WNYB). The remaining stations in Chautauqua and Allegany counties were expunged from the FCC records and presumably shut down in 2012, leaving the translator network without any remaining transmitters.

== Viewership in Southern Ontario ==
For the better part of the last four decades, WNED-TV has relied heavily on Toronto and southern Ontario for viewership and financial support; since at least 1999, it has identified as serving "Buffalo/Toronto" on-air. Toronto is the center of a market with over seven million people—seven times the population of WNED-TV's American coverage area. More than half of its members are in Canada; in February 2020, WNED officials told The Buffalo News that Canadians represented 66 percent of the station's viewership and membership revenue. Indeed, WNED-TV opted against moving its intellectual unit to channel 23 due to concerns that it would lose most of its Canadian viewership on cable.

Not only does WNED-TV take its large Canadian audience into account in its programming, but more than half of its financial support comes in Canadian dollars. WNED-TV has long operated a development/sales office in Toronto (Starwood Centre at 477 Richmond Street West).

Since 2017, Bell Fibe TV classifies the HD version (PBSHB) of WNED-TV as 1224 while the SD version (PBS-B) is 224.

== Technical information ==
=== Subchannels ===
The station's signal is multiplexed:

Subchannels of WNED-TV
Subchannel	Res.	Short name	Programming
17.1	1080i	WNED-HD	PBS
17.2	480i	Create	Create (WNED-FM SAP simulcast)
17.3	480i	KIDs	PBS Kids (WBFO SAP simulcast)
17.10	480i	WNED+	WNED-FM simulcast (4:3)

=== Analog-to-digital conversion ===
WNED-TV ended regular programming on its analog signal, over UHF channel 17, on April 16, 2009. The station's digital signal remained on its pre-transition UHF channel 43, using virtual channel 17.

== See also ==
- WDCZ (formerly a news-talk station owned by WNYPBA)
- WNLO (formerly WNEQ-TV, a secondary PBS outlet owned by WNYPBA)
- American Archive of Public Broadcasting for preserved programs from WNED.
