= Science Friday =

American radio program

- Other names: SciFri
- Genre: talk
- Running time: approx. 110 min.
- Country of origin: United States
- Language: English
- Syndicates: WNYC Studios
- Hosted by: Ira Flatow, Flora Lichtman
- Created by: ScienceFriday, Inc.
- Directed by: Charles Bergquist
- Executive producer: Ira Flatow
- Recording studio: New York City
- Original release: October 1991
- Audio format: Stereophonic
- Website: www.sciencefriday.com

Science Friday (known as SciFri for short) is a weekly call-in talk show that broadcasts each Friday on public radio stations, distributed by WNYC Studios, and carried on over 500 public radio stations. SciFri is hosted by science journalist Ira Flatow and Flora Lichtman and is produced by the Science Friday Initiative. The program is divided into two one-hour programs, with each hour ending with a complete sign-off. The focus of each program is news and information on science, nature, medicine, and technology. The show originated as the Friday episode of the daily call-in talk show Talk of the Nation, but was spun off as a series in its own right when Talk of the Nation was canceled in June 2013.

The Science Friday radio program is produced by the Science Friday Initiative, a 501(c)(3) organization. The Science Friday Initiative is an independently run organization with a governing board of directors and executive director. In addition to the radio program and podcasts, the organization creates educational and digital content, finds underwriting for the program, and hosts public science events.

Science Friday is also available as a daily podcast and is one of the most popular iTunes downloads, frequently in the top 15 downloads each week. SciFri podcasts are downloaded over 23 million times per year.

SciFri has broadcast excerpts from the annual Ig Nobel Prize ceremony on the Friday after Thanksgiving.

== Funding ==
The Science Friday Initiative accepts tax-deductible donations on behalf of the radio program.

Science Friday is funded by stations fees that broadcast the program, by individual donors, by advertising underwriters, and by foundation grants including the Alfred P. Sloan Foundation, the Research Corporation for Science Advancement, the Gordon and Betty Moore Foundation, and Heising-Simons Foundation. Formerly the program was supported by the Noyce Foundation, the S.D. Bechtel Jr. Foundation, and the Carnegie Corporation of New York. Science Friday has received federal funding from the US National Science Foundation and NASA.

== History ==
SciFri was created when the National Science Foundation agreed to fund a weekly science talk-show on NPR. After the Gulf War in 1991, NPR created the daily talk show Talk of the Nation, with Science Friday originating as the Friday edition of that series. Talk of the Nation ended its run in 2013, after which Science Friday became a standalone series and moved from NPR to Public Radio International in 2014.

Science Friday maintained an island (Science Friday Island) in Second Life, including an open-air theater with live audio and video feeds of the broadcast. That venue is no longer in operation.

On November 9, 2012, ScienceFriday, Inc. filed a trademark infringement lawsuit in New York state court against a long-running Denver radio program, titled Real Science Friday, hosted by two young Earth creationists including Colorado pastor and radio personality Bob Enyart. The show was re-titled Real Science Radio.

On April 11, 2018, distribution of the show changed hands once more when it went from PRI to WNYC Studios.

Science Friday introduced Flora Lichtman as a regular host in January 2025.

=== Undiscovered ===
Science Friday launched a spinoff podcast in collaboration with WNYC Studios entitled Undiscovered, which debuted in early 2017. The show is hosted by Elah Feder and Annie Minoff. The show is about the history of science.

== See also ==
- Institute for Nonprofit News (member)
