= WNED-FM =

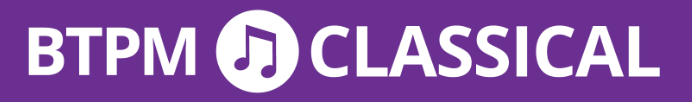
- Buffalo, New York; United States
- Broadcast area: Western New York; Toronto
- Frequency: 94.5 MHz (HD Radio)
- Branding: BTPM Classical

Programming
- Language: English
- Format: Classical music
- Subchannels: HD2: "WBFO The Bridge" (AAA)

Ownership
- Owner: Buffalo Toronto Public Media; (Western New York Public Broadcasting Association)
- Sister stations: WBFO; WNED-TV

History
- First air date: June 6, 1960 (as WEBR-FM)
- Former call signs: WEBR-FM (1960–1971); WBCE (1971–1973); WREZ (1973–1975); WEBR-FM (1975–1976)
- Call sign meaning: same as WNED-TV

Technical information
- Licensing authority: FCC
- Facility ID: 27669
- Class: B
- ERP: 94,000 watts
- HAAT: 220.5 meters (723 ft)
- Transmitter coordinates: 42°38′15.1″N 78°46′6″W
- Repeater: 89.7 WNJA (Jamestown)

Links
- Public license information: Public file; LMS
- Webcast: Listen live
- Website: www.btpm.org/listen/classical

WNED-FM (94.5 MHz) is a non-commercial radio station licensed to Buffalo, New York. WNED-FM offers a classical music format. It is owned by the Western New York Public Broadcasting Association (formerly the Western New York Educational TV Association), doing business as Buffalo Toronto Public Media. The organization also operates Buffalo's PBS station, WNED-TV (channel 17), as well as a second radio station, WBFO (which offers a news/talk format and programming from NPR). While WNED-FM airs no commercials, it does conduct periodic pledge drives on the air to seek donations for the station. WNED-FM has local hosts in most day-parts, including weekends.

Programming on WNED-FM is simulcast on WNJA (89.7 FM) in Jamestown, New York, for listeners in Southwestern New York and some parts of Pennsylvania. WNED-FM's studios and offices are at Horizons Plaza on Lower Terrace in Buffalo, and the transmitter is off Zimmerman Road in Boston, New York. WNED-FM and TV also maintain an office in Toronto for listeners and contributors in Canada.

== Superpower status ==
WNED-FM is a grandfathered "Superpower" Class B FM radio station, operating at 94,000 watts. WNED-FM is one of four Buffalo superpower FM stations, along with WBUF, WDCX-FM, and WBKV. Under current U.S. Federal Communications Commission rules, Class B FM stations are not allowed to exceed 50,000 watts ERP. WNED-FM at one time broadcast at 105,000 watts; however in 2012, it increased its antenna height due to "structural modifications" to the tower, at which time it also reduced its power. WNED-FM's signal extends into Canada; as such, the station has listeners in Toronto and around the Niagara Peninsula of Ontario. However, WNED-FM may be difficult to tune in the Hamilton area, due to adjacent-channel interference from CHKX-FM 94.7.

== History ==
WNED-FM first signed on as a commercial radio station on June 6, 1960, with the call letters WEBR-FM. It was a sister station to WEBR (970 AM). On September 24, 1971, WEBR-FM was renamed WBCE; on May 21, 1973, it became WREZ, before returning to the WEBR-FM call sign on April 21, 1975. In 1975, the Western New York Educational TV Association bought the WEBR stations, turning them into non-commercial operations. On August 14, 1976, 94.5 was renamed WNED-FM, and the following year began offering a classical music format with Peter Goldsmith serving as music director until his retirement in October 2009 (he died the following year).

WNED-FM, along with sister stations WBFO and WNED-TV, began collectively referring to themselves as Buffalo Toronto Public Media (BTPM) on February 4, 2020; concurrently, WNED-FM amended its own branding from "Classical WNED 94.5" to "WNED Classical". While the rebranding in part reflected WNED-TV's significant Canadian viewership and financial support, WNED officials told The Buffalo News that the organization's radio stations have minimal listenership in Canada. In April 2025, it further amended its branding to "BTPM Classical" to include the BTPM name and abandon any further attachment to the WNED calls other than legally mandated station identification.

=== Adoption of commercial license and proposed format change ===
In January 2026, BTPM filed with the Federal Communications Commission to revert WNED-FM's non-commercial license to a commercial one. (This would not affect WNJA, which due to its placement on the dial must remain non-commercial.) The move was made since the Corporation for Public Broadcasting (CPB) had since been defunded and disbanded, meaning that the service no longer had anything to lose by switching to commercial operations. Manager Tom Calderone noted that the station was financially solvent and not for sale (such a sale would likely do more harm than good due to the size of the CPB funding gap and the strength of the classical format's popularity), but that it was exploring adding "financial and health-and-wellness" commercials to the signal, which it had already begun doing with its online feeds. In February 2026, BTPM announced that the station's classical format would be moving to WBFO beginning in May, and that WNED-FM would be converted into a commercially supported news and sports format. At the end of May, BTPM announced that the format change had been delayed until August 13, and that the new format would be split between the previously announced commercial news/talk format during the day, branded as "94.5 The Source", and its existing adult album alternative format, "The Bridge", at night. This deadline also passed without implementation, and the changeover has been placed on an indefinite hold.

== Local programming ==
WNED-FM has an extensive music library, which allows the station to produce local programming for most of its broadcast day. It collaborates with the Buffalo Philharmonic Orchestra (conducted by JoAnn Falletta, who has her own weekday morning feature JoAnn's Classical Corner) and other local ensembles as well as local school music departments.

== HD Radio ==
WNED-FM operates in HD Radio. Its HD2 subchannel, which prior to November 2021 had carried a simulcast of WBFO, carries the JazzWorks network feed. JazzWorks had previously been heard on WBFO's subchannel before it launched an adult album alternative feed in its place in 2021. As of 2024, The Bridge is duplicated on both WNED-HD2 and WBFO-HD2, eliminating the last vestiges of jazz programming in Buffalo.

== Repeater ==
Call sign	Frequency	City of license	FID	ERP (W)	HAAT	Class	Transmitter coordinates	FCC info
WNJA	89.7 FM	Jamestown, New York	71913	6000	230 m (755 ft)	B	42°02′48″N 79°05′25″W	LMS

== See also ==
- WNED-TV
- WDCZ
- WQLN
