= WDCZ =

Coordinates: 42°44′41.2″N 78°53′12.1″W

Simulcasts WDCX-FM Buffalo
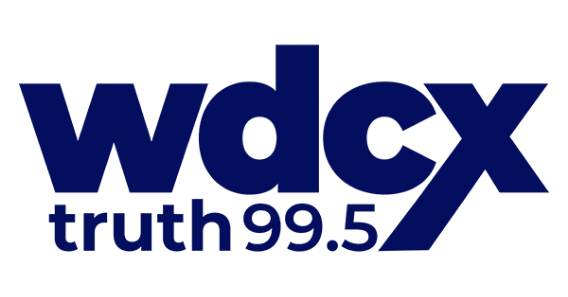
- Buffalo, New York; United States
- Broadcast area: Western New York
- Frequency: 970 kHz
- Branding: Truth 99.5

Programming
- Format: Christian

Ownership
- Owner: Crawford Broadcasting; (Kimtron, Inc.)
- Sister stations: WDCX-FM; WDCX

History
- First air date: October 14, 1924 (as WEBR)
- Former call signs: WEBR (1924–1993); WNED (1993–2012)
- Call sign meaning: initials of owner Donald Crawford

Technical information
- Licensing authority: FCC
- Facility ID: 27668
- Class: B
- Power: 5,000 watts
- Translator: 94.1 W231EA (Buffalo)

Links
- Public license information: Public file; LMS
- Webcast: Listen live
- Website: www.wdcxradio.com

WDCZ (970 AM) is an American radio station in Buffalo, New York. The station is owned by Crawford Broadcasting.

WDCZ has not originated any programming of its own since 2012. The station went on the air in 1924 as commercial station WEBR, and operated as such until its sale to the Western New York Public Broadcasting Association in 1975. It then operated as a public radio station from 1975 to 2012, changing its call sign to WNED in 1993. In its later years, much of WNED's programming duplicated that of competing FM station WBFO, which eventually prompted the two stations to merge operations (using WBFO's frequency) in 2012. After several months of simulcasting WBFO, the 970 facility was sold off to Crawford, owners of religious-formatted WDCX-FM, who in turn switched 970 to a simulcast of WDCX as WDCZ.

== History ==
The broadcast license currently used by WDCZ traces its origin to WEBR, which was launched on October 14, 1924, under a license issued to H. H. Howell at 51 Niagara Street. These call letters were randomly assigned from a sequential roster of available call signs, and the station adopted the slogan "We Extend Buffalo's Regards".

Fran Striker, later famous for co-creating the Lone Ranger, worked for the station in the early 1930s. From 1936 to 1944, WEBR was an affiliate of the Blue Network (later the American Broadcasting Company) and then with the Mutual Broadcasting System. The station was a commercial operation for its first five decades on air, competing (generally with a measure of success, despite the weakness of its highly directional signal that is aimed directly at Toronto), against competing Buffalo stations. At at least two points in its history it was a sister station to WBEN, during the times when regulatory rules allowed it.

Throughout much of the 1940s, WEBR broadcast on 1340 kHz. On April 4, 1948, the station moved to its current frequency of 970, clearing the 1340 allocation for two new local service stations in Western New York, WUSJ in Lockport and WJOC in Jamestown.

The station changed formats and owners (one of which was the Buffalo Courier-Express) in the early 1970s until the Western New York Public Broadcasting Association, who had owned WNED-TV since 1959, bought WEBR and sister station WREZ-FM (now WNED-FM) in 1975. WEBR adopted an (almost) all-news format a year later (although an evening and overnight jazz program, Jazz In The Nighttime with Al Wallack, remained on the air). In 1993 the station was assigned the WNED calls and all non-news programming was dropped. (The WEBR call sign, history and Wallack's jazz program would later be acquired by local taxicab company owner Bill Yuhnke and assigned to the former WJJL on AM 1440 in 2020; in addition to Wallack, former WEBR midday jock Jack Horohoe was brought out of retirement to resume his show.)

Unlike its counterpart WBFO, which still had music programming in midday, at night and on the weekend, WNED focused entirely on spoken-word programming. Several of the programs on WNED and WBFO (specifically both drive time programs, Morning Edition and All Things Considered) overlapped with different production teams for local inserts, each with its own hosts. (In addition, the weekend A Prairie Home Companion aired on both WNED AM and WNED-FM, an arrangement that continued as of 2013 with WBFO and WNED-FM.)

Until March 1, 2012, WNED was one of two National Public Radio members in Buffalo. The other was WBFO, formerly operated by the University at Buffalo (UB). In July 2012, UB sold WBFO to the Western New York Public Broadcasting Association. With WNED's takeover of WBFO, the duplication of programming was expected to end; there had been speculation (which turned out to be accurate) that WNED would be sold despite strong support in the local market for differentiated jazz, blues, news and talk programming.WNED was also chosen as the station to be divested because, as it was later revealed in 2020, its directional signal had a strong signal over the city of Toronto, but the station had minimal listenership there; this is in contrast to WNED-TV, which has a strong audience in the city.

On March 1, 2012, WNED ceased independent operations and began simulcasting WBFO. This led to much of the news and information programming that had aired on the weekend by WNED being replaced by NPR entertainment programs, such as Wait Wait Don't Tell Me and Car Talk (some of the displaced programs later returned after Talk of the Nation was canceled). WNED, which had not aired music since 1993, now aired blues programming Saturday and Sunday evenings, but in return, WBFO (and, with it, the entire Buffalo market) was stripped of all of its jazz programming.

On August 29, 2012, Crawford Broadcasting, a Denver–based firm, announced its intention to buy WNED AM for $875,000. A spokeswoman for WNED said a closing date for the sale depended on approval by regulators. Donald B. Crawford, the Crawford Broadcasting president said that he expected his company to take over the station and begin programming it around January 1, 2013. The WBFO simulcast continued until midnight November 30, 2012. The owner at that time had announced at 10 pm that it would cease operations at midnight. The station was silent for an entire month which gave those who enjoy trying to receive distant stations an opportunity to receive distant signals at or near that frequency that they would not otherwise have. The finalization of the sale took place at midnight November 30, 2012, through licensee Kimtron, Inc; the station's call sign was changed the same day to WDCZ.

WDCZ returned to the air on January 1, 2013, as a simulcast of WDCX-FM 99.5. This is a second station for Crawford in the Buffalo market as it is the long time owner of WDCX, whose programming it planned to simulcast in order to further its reach into southern Ontario (this despite WDCX already having one of the strongest signals in the entire country and one that easily covers Southern Ontario), further perpetuating the same type of duplicity that had prompted the previous owners to sell the station in the first place.

== See also ==
- WNED-TV
- WNED-FM
- WBFO
- WDCX-FM
