= WDCX-FM =

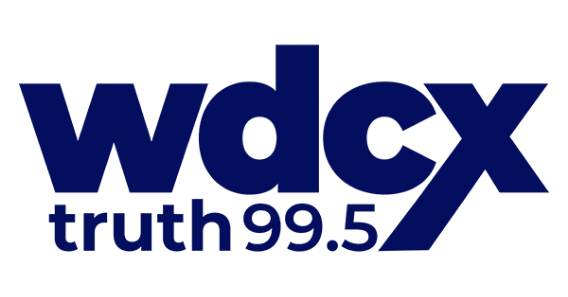
- Buffalo, New York; United States
- Broadcast area: Western New York; Niagara Peninsula; Ontario
- Frequency: 99.5 MHz (HD Radio)
- Branding: Truth 99.5

Programming
- Format: Christian talk and teaching
- Subchannels: HD2: Christian music

Ownership
- Owner: Crawford Broadcasting; (Kimtron, Inc.)
- Sister stations: WDCZ; WDCX

History
- First air date: February 18, 1963
- Call sign meaning: Donald Crawford (owner) + X (Christian cross)

Technical information
- Licensing authority: FCC
- Facility ID: 34820
- Class: B
- ERP: 110,000 watts
- HAAT: 195 meters (640 ft)
- Transmitter coordinates: 42°38′9.2″N 78°46′6.1″W
- Repeater: 970 WDCZ (Buffalo)

Links
- Public license information: Public file; LMS
- Webcast: Listen live; HD2: Listen live
- Website: www.wdcxradio.com

WDCX-FM (99.5 MHz) is a commercial radio station licensed to Buffalo, New York. The station airs a Christian talk and teaching radio format. WDCX-FM is owned by Kimtron, Inc., a division of Crawford Broadcasting. Its studios are located in the Allentown neighborhood north of downtown Buffalo, and the transmitter site is located off Zimmerman Road in Boston, New York, southeast of Buffalo.

As a brokered time station, nationally known religious leaders pay WDCX-FM for their half hour segments on the station, and appeal to the listeners for contributions. Hosts on WDCX-FM include Dr. Charles Stanley, Jim Daly, Chuck Swindoll and Jay Sekulow. Since 2012, WDCX is simulcast on WDCZ (970 AM) in Buffalo. Programming is also heard on WDCX (990 AM) in Rochester, New York.

WDCX-FM broadcasts in HD Radio. The station's HD 2 channel carries Christian music.

== History ==
WDCX-FM signed on for the first time on February 18, 1963, and has been owned by the Crawford family for its entire existence. Since its founding, WDCX-FM has broadcast religious programming, with Donald B. Crawford, the son of evangelist Percy Crawford, as WDCX-FM's original president. Crawford's initials are represented by the "DC" in the station's call letters, with the "X" representing the Christian cross.

== Superpower status ==
WDCX-FM is a grandfathered "superpower" Class B FM radio station, operating at 110,000 watts. Buffalo has three other superpower FM stations: 92.9 WBUF, 94.5 WNED-FM and 102.5 WBKV. (WBKV also broadcasts at 110,000 watts but has a taller antenna, so it has a larger coverage area.) Under current Federal Communications Commission rules, Class B FM stations are not allowed to exceed 50,000 watts ERP. WDCX-FM's signal not only covers much of Western New York but extends into Canada. The station has listeners in Toronto, Hamilton and around the Niagara Peninsula of Ontario.
