= WDCX (AM) =

Simulcast of WDCX-FM, Buffalo
- Rochester, New York; United States
- Broadcast area: Rochester metropolitan area
- Frequency: 990 kHz
- Branding: Truth 990

Programming
- Format: Religious

Ownership
- Owner: Crawford Broadcasting; (Kimtron, Inc.)
- Sister stations: WDCX-FM; WDCZ

History
- First air date: 1947 (on AM 680)
- Former call signs: WRNY (1947–1955); WRVM (1957–1965); WNYR (1965–1988); WEZO (1988–1990); WRMM (1990–1993); WCMF (1993–1997); WDCZ (1997–1999); WLGZ (1999–2008); WRCI (5/2008–9/2008)
- Former frequencies: 680 kHz (1947–1979)
- Call sign meaning: Donald Crawford (owner) + X (Christian cross)

Technical information
- Licensing authority: FCC
- Facility ID: 1906
- Class: B
- Power: 5,000 watts day; 2,500 watts night
- Transmitter coordinates: 43°13′54.2″N 77°51′59″W
- Translator: 107.1 W296EF (Rochester)

Links
- Public license information: Public file; LMS
- Webcast: Listen live
- Website: www.wdcxradio.com/rochester/

WDCX (990 kHz) is a commercial AM radio station licensed to Rochester, New York. The station airs a brokered religious radio format. WDCX's license is held by Kimtron, Inc. which is owned by Crawford Broadcasting. WDCX was a sister station to WLGZ-FM 102.7 (which previously occupied the AM 990 frequency).

WDCX and former sister station WLGZ studios and offices are on Browncroft Boulevard in Rochester. The transmitter is off Clarkson Parma Townline Road in Brockport, New York.

WDCX programming originates from co-owned WDCX-FM 99.5 in Buffalo, New York. It is also simulcast on WDCZ (970 AM) in Buffalo. As a brokered time station, nationally known religious leaders pay WDCX for their half hour segments on the station, and appeal to the listeners for contributions. Hosts on WDCX include Dr. Charles Stanley, Jim Daly, Chuck Swindoll and Jay Sekulow.

== History ==
The station now known as WDCX has its roots in an earlier radio station, on a different frequency. In 1947, WRNY signed on at 680 kHz. It was a low-power (250 watts) daytime-only station because it was on the same clear channel frequency as 25,000–watt CFTR in Toronto, which is about 100 miles (160 km) away from Rochester as the crow flies. (Today, CFTR runs 50,000 watts and can be heard in some areas of Rochester.) WRNY added an FM sister station (WRNY-FM 97.7) primarily to give the station a night signal, but in the 1950s, few listeners had FM radios. WRNY-FM signed off by 1955.

From 1957 to 1965, WRNY ran a top 40 format, switching to the call sign WRVM ("Rochester's Voice of Music"). In 1965, the top 40 music was gone and in its place was a country music format under a new call sign, WNYR. Country music lasted 22 years on the channel. A new sister station, WNYR-FM (now WRMM-FM), signed on in 1966, this time becoming permanent. The AM station moved from 680 kHz to 990 kHz in early July 1979, allowing the station to broadcast 24 hours a day. In 1987, as country music became more popular on FM radio, WBEE-FM was established. WNYR lost its advantage to WBEE and gave up on country music.

The station changed call signs, and formats, to adult standards WEZO on June 21, 1988. (That same year, Malrite Communications sold the station to Boston-based Atlantic Ventures.) On February 26, 1990, the station changed its call sign to WRMM, and began simulcasting WRMM-FM's adult contemporary format. Then on May 14, 1993, after Atlantic Ventures merged with two other broadcasting companies to form American Radio Systems, WRMM switched to WCMF, and switched to simulcasting WCMF-FM's classic rock format; the following year, the AM adopted a sports talk format. On August 1, 1997, after the station was sold from American Radio Systems to Crawford Broadcasting, it became religious-formatted WDCZ; on December 1, 1999, the callsign changed to WLGZ and the station returned to adult standards. On February 11, 2008, the station's "Legends" format was modified to incorporate more oldies and soft adult contemporary material, and officially moved to sister station WLGZ-FM 102.7 (formerly WRCI "The Light", a contemporary Christian station).

On May 23, 2008, AM 990 began broadcasting religious programming under the call sign WRCI which was previously assigned to WLGZ-FM prior to February 11, 2008, effectively accomplishing a call sign swap between the AM and FM stations. On September 1, 2008, the call sign was changed again to WDCX to match with sister station WDCX-FM in Buffalo.
