= List of the initial commercial FM station assignments issued by the Federal Communications Commission on October 31, 1940 =

This is a list of the first fifteen construction permits that were granted by the United States Federal Communications Commission (FCC) for commercial FM stations. These were all issued on October 31, 1940.

== Background ==
On May 24, 1940, the FCC had announced the establishment, effective January 1, 1941, of an FM radio band operating on 40 channels spanning 42–50 MHz, with the first five channels (42.1 to 42.9 MHz) reserved for educational stations, and the other 35 (43.1 to 49.9 MHz) available for commercial operation. On October 31, 1940, the first 15 commercial station Construction Permit authorizations were issued. Many of the grantees already operated standard AM stations in the same community, and some had previous experience operating "high frequency band" stations, including high-fidelity "Apex" AM, and experimental FM.

Although educational FM stations received standard four-letter call signs like those issued to AM stations, initially a new form of call sign was mandated for the commercial FM stations, with an initial "W" for those located east, and "K" for those west, of the Mississippi River, followed by the last two digits of a station's frequency assignment (31 to 99) and closing with a one or two character regional identifier, such as "B" for Boston, "C" for Chicago, and "NY" for New York City.

Effective November 1, 1943, the FCC modified its policy for FM call letters, with commercial stations now receiving call signs from the same block of four letter call signs as the AM and educational FM stations, plus the new optional suffix of "-FM". On June 27, 1945, the FCC announced the reassignment of the FM band to 80 channels from 88 to 106 MHz, which was soon expanded to 100 channels from 88 to 108 MHz. The FCC provided that, during a transitional period, stations could simultaneously broadcast on both their old and new frequencies.

Fourteen of the fifteen initial grants resulted in operating stations—the one exception was the Brooklyn, New York grant to Frequency Broadcasting Corporation. Half of the fourteen constructed stations ended operations during the FM band's difficult financial period of the 1940s and 1950s, with the other 7, highlighted in the table below in beige, ultimately surviving.

== Table of October 31, 1940 assignments ==
Community	Owner	Earlier Related Stations			October 31, 1940 Assignment				
Community	Owner	Apex (VHF AM)	Experimental FM	Standard AM	Orig. Freq. (MHz)	Orig. Call Sign	November 1, 1943 Call Letters	FCC History Cards	Status
Detroit, Michigan	Evening News Assn.	W8XWJ		WWJ	44.5	W45D	WENA	1940-1979	WXYT-FM Detroit, Michigan
Los Angeles, California	Don Lee			KHJ	44.5	K45LA	KHJ-FM	1940-1981	KRTH Los Angeles, California
Schenectady, New York	Capitol Broadcasting Co. Inc.				44.7	W47A	WBCA		Deleted 1952 as WBCA Schenectady, New York
New York, New York	Marcus Loew Booking Agency			WHN	46.3	W63NY	WHNF		Deleted 1955 as WMGM-FM New York, New York
New York, New York	NBC		W2XWG	WEAF	45.1	W51NY	n/a	1940-1981	WQHT New York, New York
New York, New York	W. G. H. Finch	W2XWF			45.5	W55NY	WFGG	1940-1981	WFAN-FM New York, New York
Brooklyn, New York	Frequency Broadcasting Corp.				45.9	W59NY	---	1940-1942	Deleted May 13, 1942, as W99NY (construction permit) New York, New York
Evansville, Indiana	Evansville On the Air Inc.			WEOA-WGBF	44.5	W45V	WMLL		Deleted June 13, 1956, as WMLL Evansville, Indiana
Mount Washington, New Hampshire	Yankee Network		W1XER		43.9	W39B	WGTR		Deleted October 1948 as WMNE Portland, Maine
Binghamton, New York	Howitt-Wood Radio Co.			WNBF	44.9	W49BN	WNBF-FM		Deleted August 11, 1952, as WNBF-FM Binghamton, New York
Baton Rouge, Louisiana	Baton Rouge Broadcasting Co.			WJBO	44.5	W45BR	WBRL	1940-1981	WFMF Baton Rouge, Louisiana
Columbus, Ohio	WBNS Inc.		W8XVH	WBNS	44.5	W45CM	WELD		Deleted July 14, 1953, as WELD, Columbus, Ohio
Salt Lake City, Utah	Radio Service Corp. of Utah			KSL	44.7	K47SL	KSL-FM	1940-1981	KSFI Salt Lake City, Utah
Chicago, Illinois	Zenith Radio Corp.		W9XEN; W9XZR		45.1	W51C	WWZR	1940-1981	WUSN Chicago, Illinois
Milwaukee, Wisconsin	Journal Co.	W9XAZ	W9XAO	WTMJ	45.5	W55M	WMFM		Deleted April 1950 as WTMJ-FM Milwaukee, Wisconsin

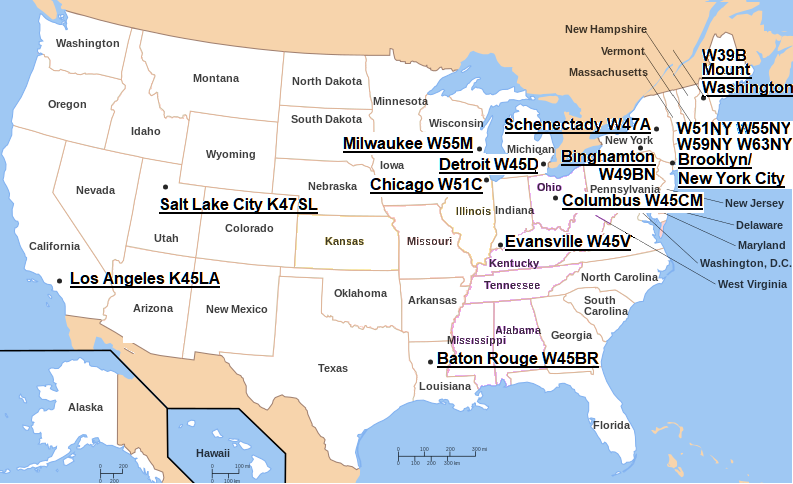
Map of the first 15 commercial FM stations, authorized by the Federal Communications Commission on October 31, 1940. These stations were primarily located in the eastern half of the U.S.
