= WTMJ-FM =

Commercial radio station in Milwaukee, Wisconsin (1940–1950)

WTMJ-FM was a pioneer commercial FM radio station, owned by the Journal Company, publishers of The Milwaukee Journal, and located in Milwaukee, Wisconsin. In the late 1940s, it was one of the first FM stations in America and among the most powerful. Although heavily promoted, the station was unprofitable and ceased operations in April 1950. Management foresaw a limited future, especially in contrast to recently introduced television broadcasting.

== History ==
WTMJ-FM was started by the Milwaukee Journal Company, which had an extensive history of operating broadcasting stations. In 1927, the Journal acquired an AM station which dated to 1922 as one of Wisconsin's earliest stations. It changed the station's call sign to WTMJ, representing the initials of The Milwaukee Journal. In 1936 its experimental high-fidelity station, W9XAZ, which at first had duplicated the programming of WTMJ, became the first "Apex" station to originate its own programming on a regular basis.

=== W9XAO / W55M ===
On February 23, 1940, the company's experimental FM station, W9XAO, began regular broadcasting as the first FM station west of the Allegheny Mountains. In May 1940, the Federal Communications Commission (FCC) announced the establishment, effective January 1, 1941, of an FM band operating on 40 channels spanning 42–50 MHz. The first fifteen commercial FM station construction permits were issued on October 31, 1940, including one to the Milwaukee Journal Company for 45.5 MHz, which was issued the call sign W55M. (Note: The call sign policy for commercial FM stations stipulated an initial "W" for stations located east of the Mississippi River, followed by the last two digits of a station's frequency assignment, "55" in this case, and closing with a one or two character city identifier, which for Milwaukee stations was "M".)

=== WMFM ===
Effective November 1, 1943, the FCC revised its policy for FM call letters. The station call letters were changed to WMFM. The station initially maintained separate programming from WTMJ, and advertised that it operated under a creed of "Distinctive, quality programs, keyed to the wants and needs of the community".

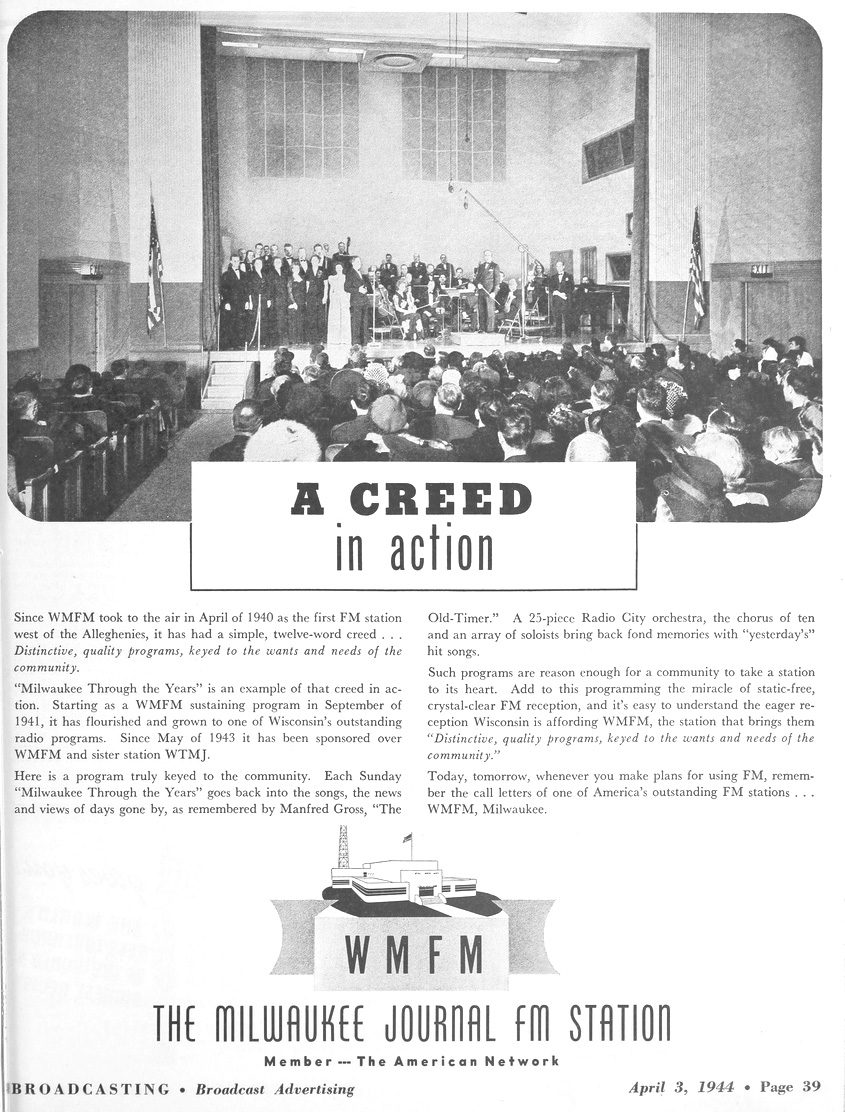
April 3, 1944 advertisement reviewing a live broadcast from WTMJ's Radio City auditorium, and the station's programming creed.

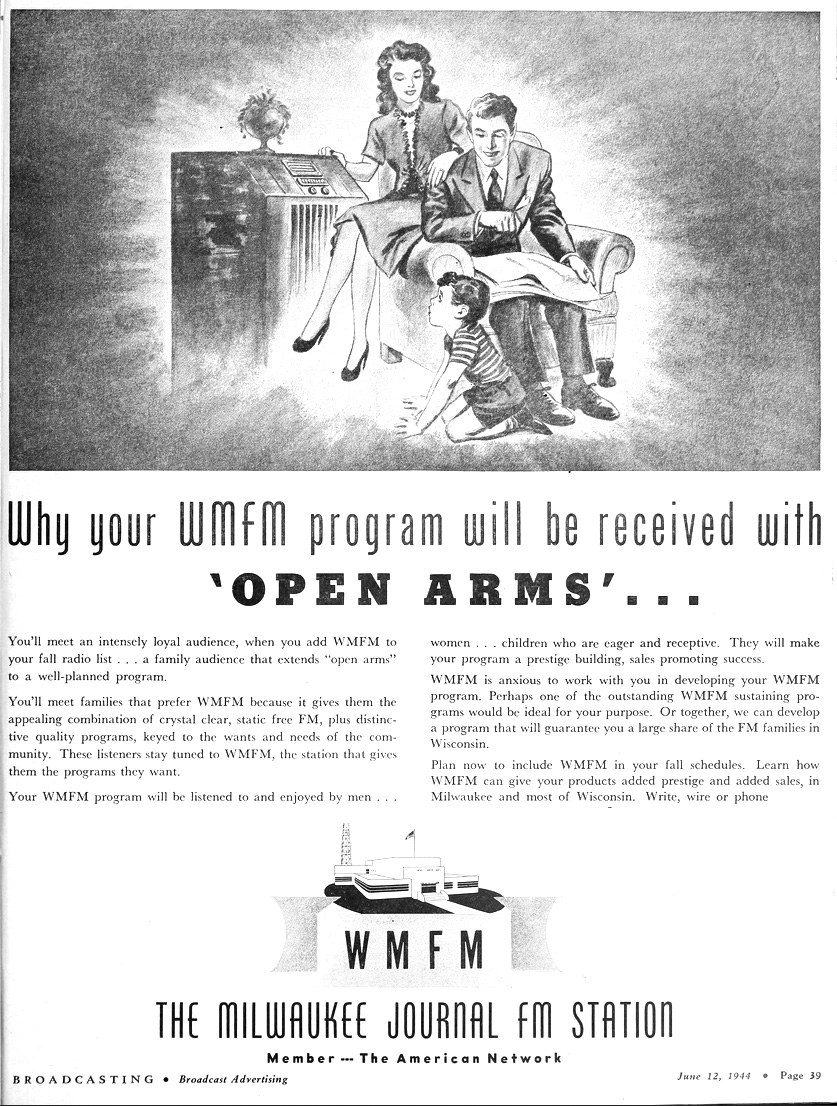
June 12, 1944 advertisement soliciting program sponsors.

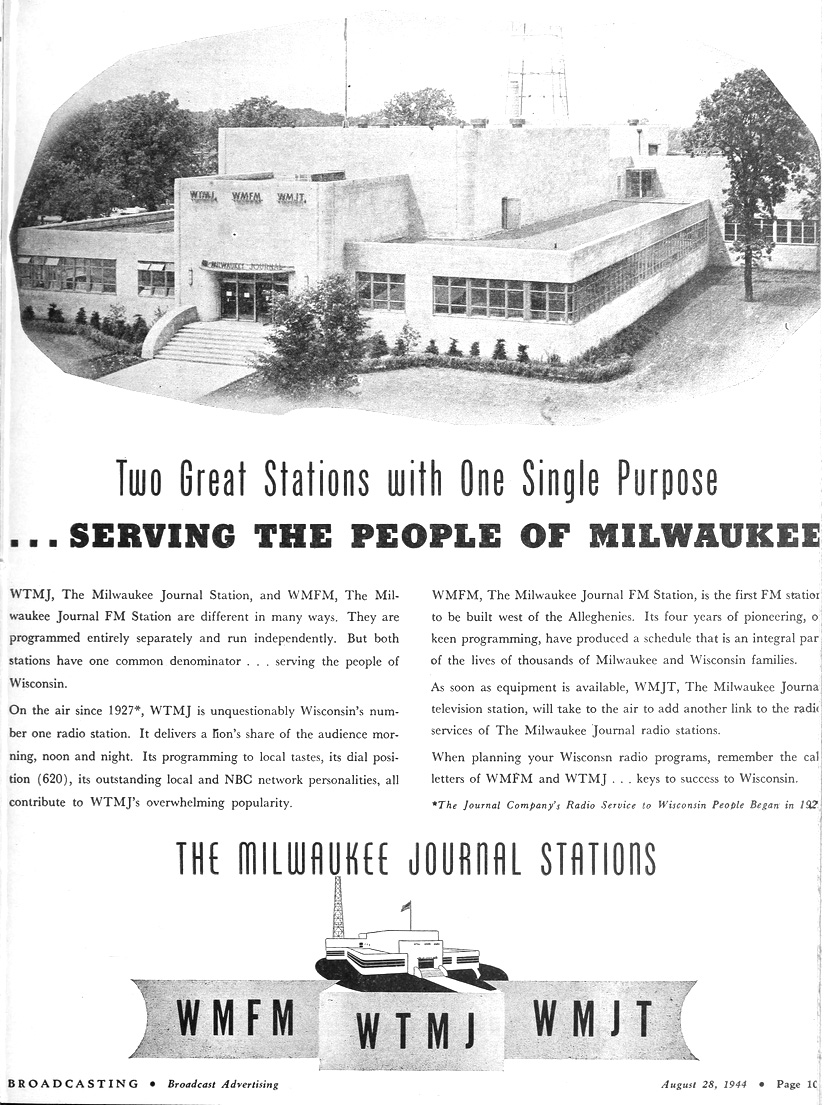
An August 28, 1944 advertisement included WMFM's AM sister station, WTMJ, and an authorized TV station, WMJT, which debuted in 1947 as WTMJ-TV.

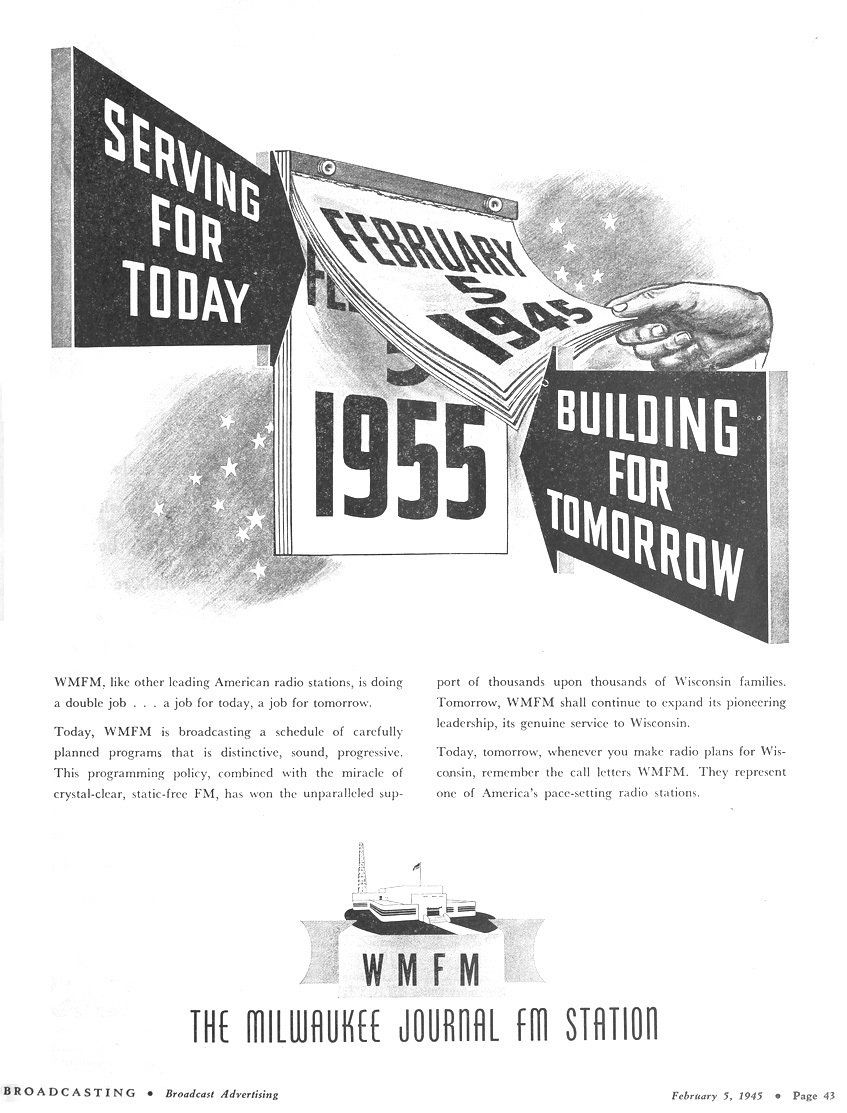
Although this February 5, 1945 advertisement envisioned WMFM still existing in 1955, it was actually deleted (as WTMJ-FM) in 1950.

=== WTMJ-FM ===
The station’s call sign became WTMJ-FM on December 1, 1945, and it was reported that "the change was made in anticipation of eventual duplication of programs on WTMJ". In late 1947, the company began operation of WTMJ-TV, which owing to a lack of local competition until 1953 and an ability to 'cherry-pick' programming among major television networks, would be immediately successful. WTMJ-FM in contrast had few local competitors on the same band, but also had to compete with FM stations backed by both the major networks and radio manufacturers from Chicago who had much more financial backing and runway than the conservative and employee-owned Journal Company.

In 1948, the FCC reassigned the original FM "low band" frequencies to other services, and moved FM stations to new "high band" assignments, with WTMJ-FM relocated to 93.3 MHz. This change meant that listeners had to incur the expense of buying new receivers, and stations had to purchase replacement transmitters. On September 18, WTMJ-FM began regular operation of what was described as the first superpower station on the new band, from a new site in Washington County located atop Richfield Hill, about 21 miles (34 km) northwest of downtown Milwaukee. A 50 kW transmitter, fed into an eight-element antenna located atop a 550-foot (170 m) Blaw-Knox tower, resulted in an effective radiated power (ERP) of 349 kilowatts. WTMJ-FM began running classical music for some hours of the day. One of the announcers was WTMJ's Jonathan Green, who utilized a more sophisticated voice and name as J. Bradley Green for his work with the FM side.

By the late 1940s, most FM stations were struggling financially and few homes had an FM receiver. In 1949, 210 stations were shut down, with a further 25 closing in the first three months of 1950, leaving about 700 on the air. WTMJ-FM, along with co-owned WSAU-FM in Wausau, ended operations on April 2, 1950, with their licenses turned in to the FCC for cancellation. In early 1948, Walter J. Damm, vice president of the Journal Company, had predicted that "FM will replace AM as the American system of broadcasting. Whether it will be five or ten years, I don't know." But upon taking WTMJ-FM off the air, he stated that "FM has not lived up to the bright promise of 10 years ago. The radio listeners in Wisconsin have not seen fit to invest in a sufficient number of FM receivers to make the continued operation of WTMJ-FM and WSAU-FM a worthwhile undertaking".

Damm's statement further noted that "Our decision to drop FM, however, does not change in any way the Journal Co. announced policy to bring the latest developments in radio and television to the people of Wisconsin, if such developments can be and will be of service to a substantial number." In 1959 a new WTMJ-FM was licensed to Journal, on a different frequency. Its initial power was just 2,800 watts, less than one percent of that of its predecessor, but much more centralized, using WTMJ-TV's existing transmitter behind Journal's Radio City on E. Capitol Drive. The year before, WQFM succeeded Journal's original allocation at 93.3 FM.
