= WMGM =

WMGM may refer to:

- WMGM (FM), a radio station on 103.7 MHz, licensed for Atlantic City, New Jersey, United States since the 1960s
- WMGM-TV, a television station (channel 40 analog/36 digital) licensed for Wildwood, New Jersey
- WMGM-LP, a defunct low-power television station (channel 7) formerly licensed for Atlantic City, New Jersey, and which simulcast WMGM-TV
- WEPN, a radio station on 1050 kHz, licensed for New York City, which used the WMGM call sign from 1948 to 1962
- WMGM-FM (New York City), a defunct radio station on 100.3 MHz, licensed for New York City from 1942 to 1955
