= WMLL (Indiana) =

FM radio station in Evansville, Indiana (1941–1956)

WMLL was an FM radio station in Evansville, Indiana, that began broadcasting, as W45V, in 1941. It was the first commercial FM station authorized in the state of Indiana. WMLL suspended operations and was deleted in 1956.

== History ==
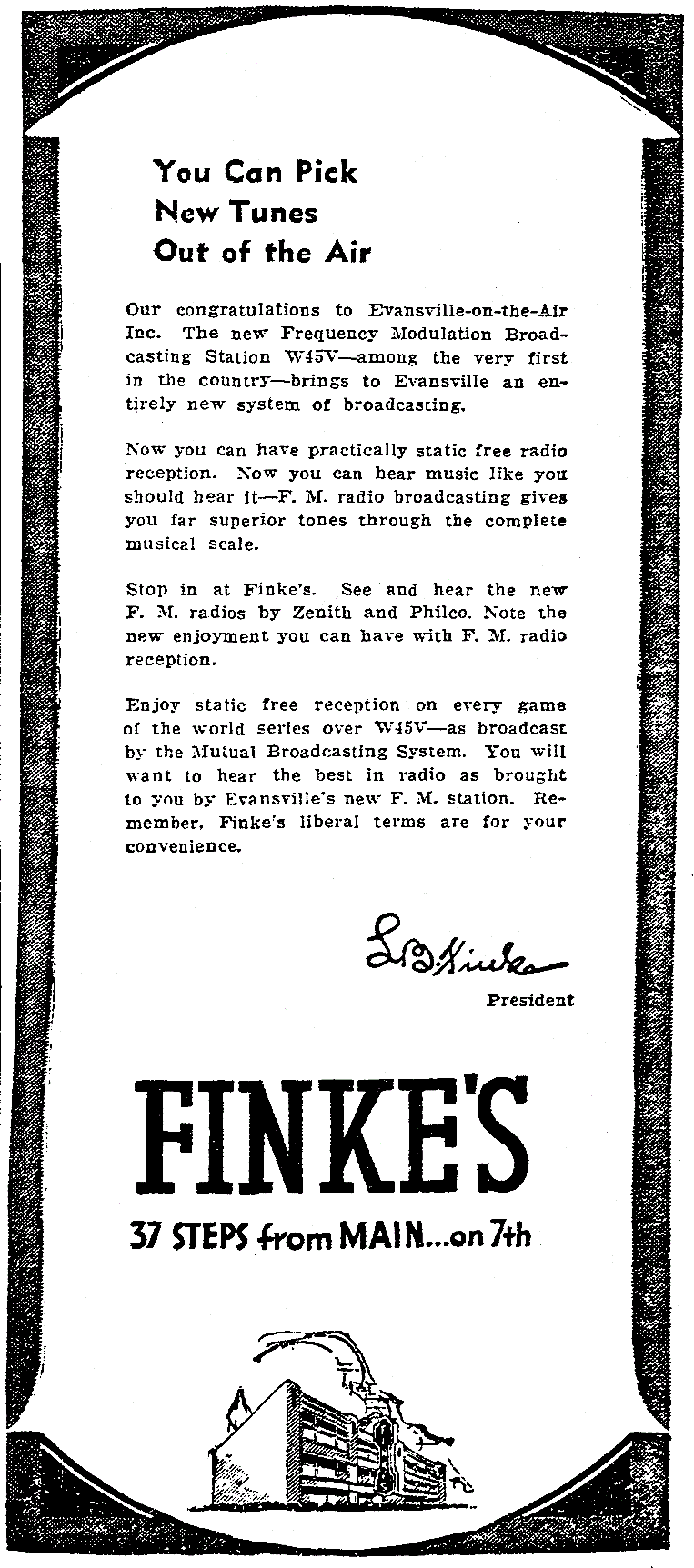
W45V debuted in September 1941 as "among the very first" FM radio stations.

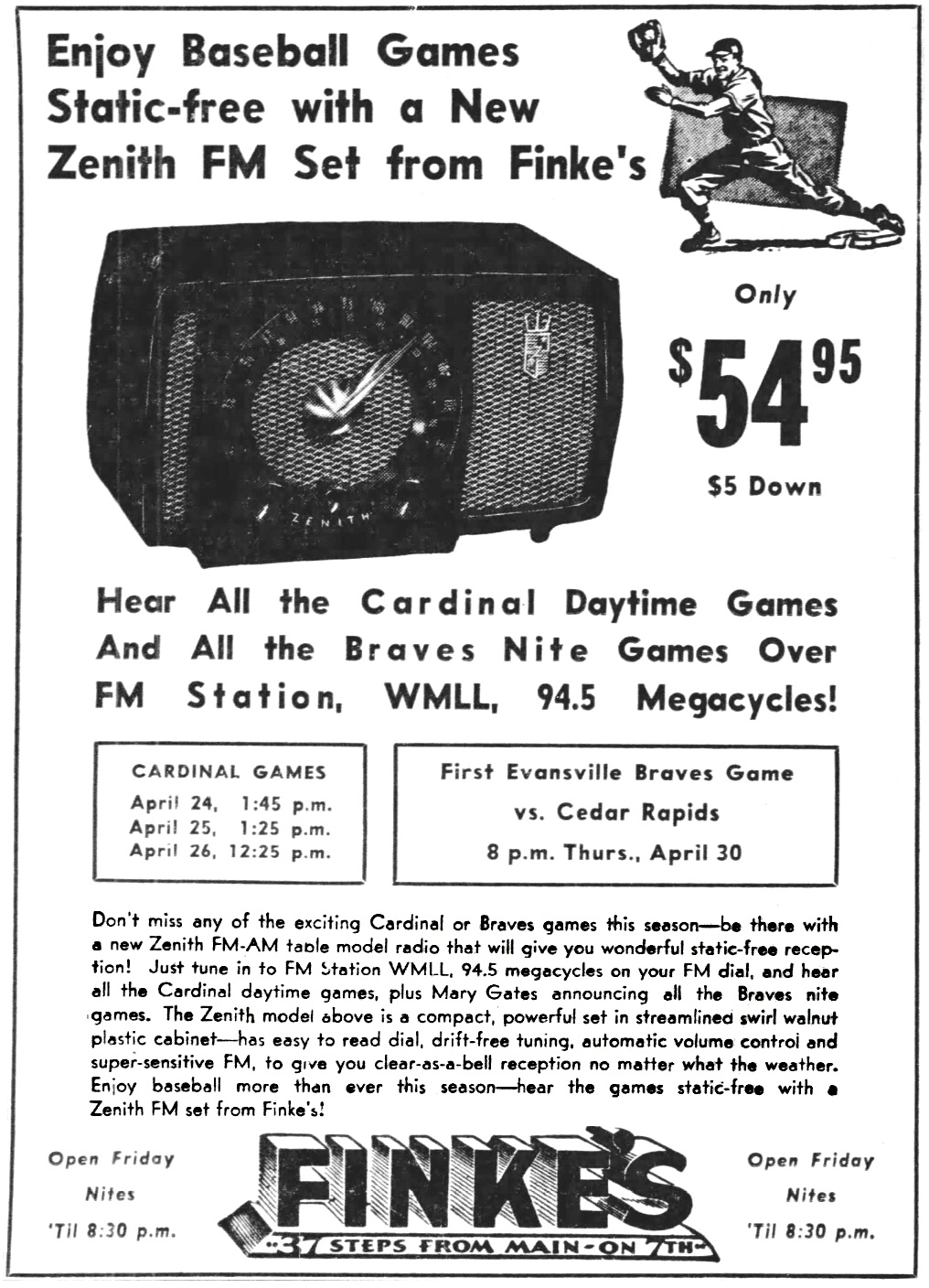
Twelve years later W45V's call sign had changed to WMLL, while Finke's continued selling FM "static-free" receivers.

In May 1940, the Federal Communications Commission (FCC) announced the establishment, effective January 1, 1941, of an FM radio band operating on 40 channels spanning 42–50 MHz. On October 31, 1940, the first fifteen construction permits for commercial FM stations were issued, including one to Evansville On the Air, Inc. for a station at 44.5 MHz in Evansville, Indiana, which was issued the call sign W45V. (Note: The initial policy for commercial FM station call signs included an initial "W" for stations located east of the Mississippi River, followed by the last two digits of a station's frequency assignment, "45" in this case, and closing with a one or two character regional identifier, which for Evansville was "V".)

Evansville was a much smaller market than most of the other grants, which generally were located in major metropolitan areas. Some stations placed their transmitters on mountain tops in order to cover large geographical areas, however W45V's antenna was located atop an AM station's 200-foot (61 m) tower, that was constructed on the rooftop of a 100-foot (30 m) tall building. Effective November 1, 1943, the FCC modified its policy for FM call letters, and the station was assigned new call letters of WMLL.

Many pioneer FM stations had existing AM station companions, but WMLL was unusual in having two, as Evansville On the Air was the licensee for both WEOA and WGBF in Evansville. However, the August 1941 adoption of the FCC's "duopoly" rule restricted licensees from operating more than one AM band station in a given market. To meet the new requirement, in 1946 arrangements were made to sell the smaller station, WEOA, with WGBF and WMLL both remaining under Evansville On the Air ownership.

On June 27, 1945, the FCC announced the reassignment of the FM band to 80 channels from 88 to 106 MHz, which was soon expanded to 100 channels from 88 to 108 MHz. WMLL's assignment on the new band was originally at 94.7 MHz, which was later changed to 94.5 MHz. The FCC provided that, during a transitional period, stations could simultaneously broadcast on both their old and new frequencies. WMLL instead decided to shut down its 44.5 MHz transmitter and broadcast solely on its new assignment, while implementing a widespread program of converting local receivers to operate on the new band. This involved installing converters on existing receivers, and the station began a conversion program at a total cost of less than $10 per set. However, the new FM band had two-and-one-half times as many channels as the original band, and reviews of some converters stated that they were only capable of tuning a portion of the new band's 20 MHz span.

Many FM stations faced major financial challenges in the 1950s, and WMLL turned in its license and was deleted on June 13, 1956.
