= WBCA (New York) =

Radio station in Schenectady, New York (1941–1952)

WBCA was a short-lived commercial FM radio station, licensed to Schenectady, New York. The station, originally W47A, launched on July 17, 1941, as the first commercial FM station without an associated AM station. The call sign was changed to WBCA in 1943. Despite initial optimism that FM stations would soon supplant the AM band, WBCA ceased operations in 1952 due essentially to the small number of FM receivers in use.

== History ==
=== W47A ===
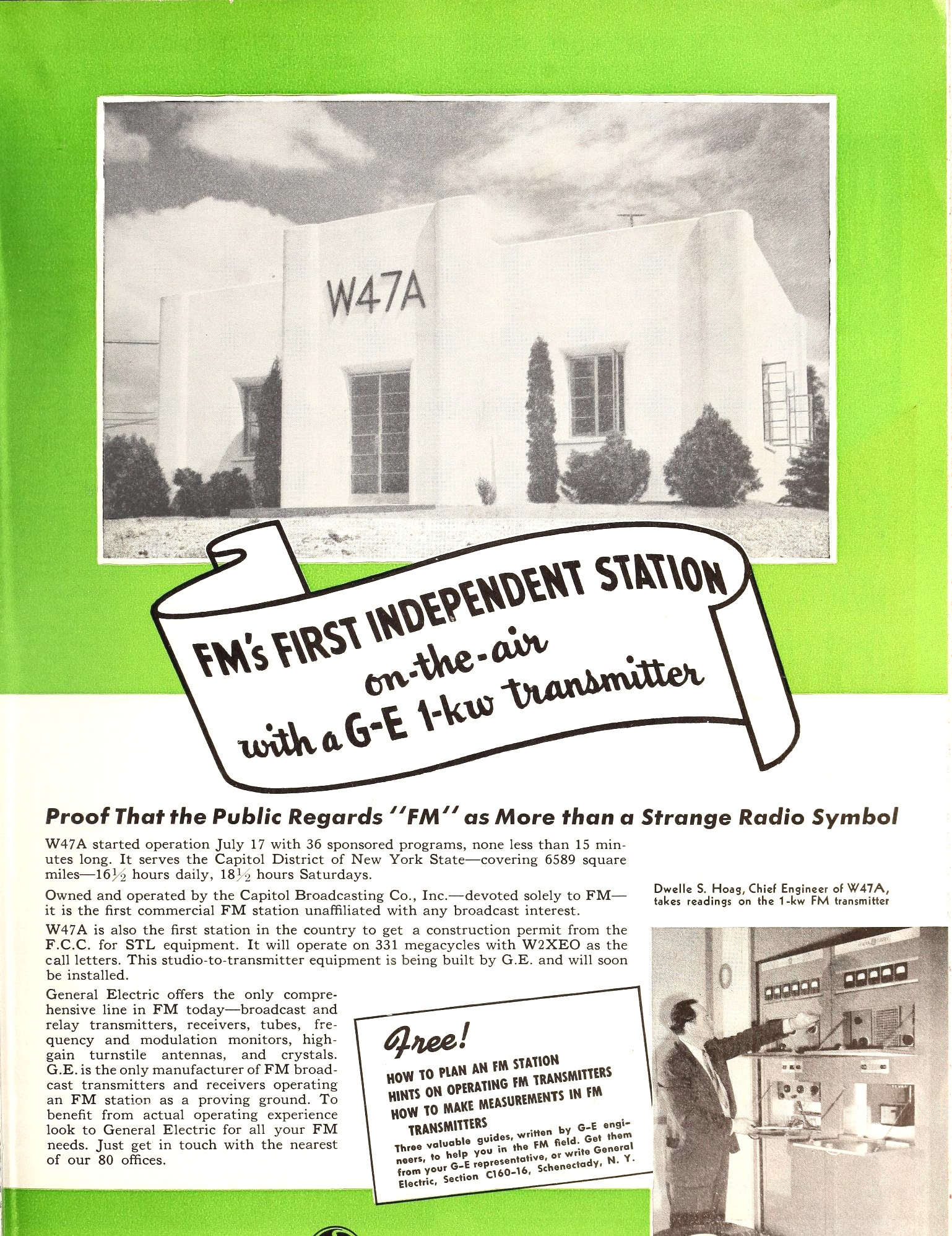
1941 advertisement for General Electric transmitters, featuring W47A.

In May 1940, the Federal Communications Commission (FCC) announced the establishment, effective January 1, 1941, of an FM radio band operating on 40 channels spanning 42–50 MHz. The first fifteen commercial FM station construction permits were issued on October 31, 1940, including one to the Capitol Broadcasting Company in Schenectady for 44.7 MHz, which was issued the call sign W47A. The station made its debut broadcast on July 17, 1941.

The person primarily responsible for the station's founding was Leonard L. Asch, who had an extensive background in marketing at General Electric. A 1941 station review reported that "the advent of W47A on the air waves was greeted by five pages of promotional material in one Schenectady paper, six pages in the other Schenectady daily, and by two pages each in the Albany and Troy papers." Close attention was given to the station's character, and this report further stated that "The problem of earning a reputation among both sponsors and the listening public for 'class,' without falling into the error of becoming a 'snob' station, has required some ticklish maneuvering. Offers of programs from so-called 'borax' houses and other opportunistic high-pressure merchandisers have been declined as tactfully as possible, in keeping with the high standards established for all Frequency Modulation broadcasting. It is believed that the temporary loss of immediate revenue will be compensated by an increasing public recognition of the worthwhileness of those sponsors whose programs are acceptable."

At this time FM was still a new, unproven technology. The station owners put on a series of demonstrations, and began locally selling General Electric-brand receivers (which did not cover the entire FM broadcast band, to make it difficult to receive competing stations). One station countered with advertisements declaring "This is not an FM station, and can be heard on any set."

Programming, spanning 16 hours per day, came from a variety of sources, including retransmission of over-the-air signals from FM stations in Paxton, Massachusetts, and Alpine, New Jersey. W47A was the first FM station to affiliate with the Mutual Broadcasting System, and also became a Yankee network affiliate. A studio transmitter link, operating at 331 MHz, connected the main Schenectady studio to the Helderberg mountaintop transmitter.

=== WBCA ===
Effective November 1, 1943, the FCC modified its policy for FM call letters, and the call sign was changed to WBCA. The call letters represented "the names of the three men in charge. The 'B' is for Harold E. Blodgett, Schenectady attorney; the 'C' represents James E. Cushing, leader in local business and civic affairs; and the 'A' is for Leonard L. Asch, formerly in charge of sales promotion methods in the merchandise department at General Electric Co. The three men initiated and financed the station, and are its owners."

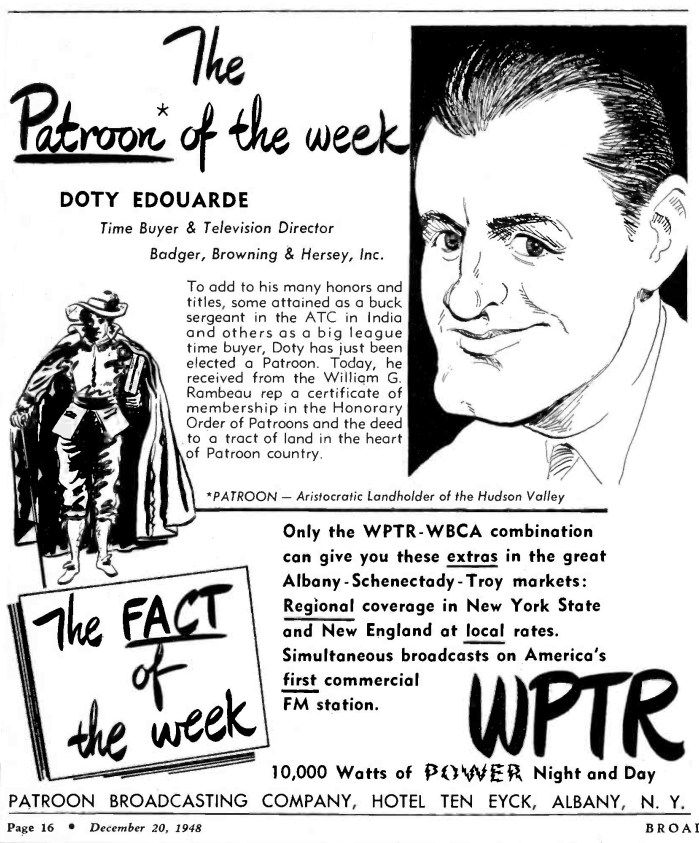
An AM sister station, WPTR, debuted in 1948, and advertising began to relegate WBCA to a secondary role.

On June 27, 1945, the FCC announced the reassignment of the FM band to 80 channels from 88–106 MHz (which was soon expanded to 100 channels from 88–108 MHz), in part due to concern that under unusual atmospheric conditions signals on the existing frequencies were prone to causing interference, by traveling much greater than usual distances. (In 1943, WBCA had reported that under certain conditions it had been received as far away as Venezuela.) Most existing station owners opposed the move, and in 1947 Asch reported that, out of 18,000 FM homes within the WBCA service area, more than 15,000 had radios that could not tune to the new high band, and "Judging from the constantly descending production figures of set manufacturers, it will be a long time before this low band audience will be equalled with high band sets." Despite the opposition the transfer eventually took place. During a 1948 transitional period, WBCA broadcast simultaneously on its original 44.7 MHz frequency and its new "high band" channel of 101.1 MHz, eventually shutting down the 44.7 MHz signal.

A 1941 review of the station's finances had been positive, stating shortly after its debut that "Probably unique in the history of broadcasting is W47A's feat of commencing commercial operations on the very first day with a schedule of programs sufficient to just meet operating expenses, exclusive of capital costs." In 1943 it was reported that "the station isn't making any money, but it isn't losing any either". The 1941 review stated that "In some instances, far-sighted businessmen who spotted the future opportunities of FM asked to have contracts made on a two- or three-year basis", although "All such offers, naturally, were declined with thanks." In 1945, Asch revised this latter comment to "I am sorry that we declined these offers with thanks." Still, despite ongoing financial challenges, he was optimistic, maintaining that "Four years of fulltime operation under the most adverse conditions without dipping prohibitively into the red—argues well for FM operation in normal times with sets available." and "Away from the metropolitan centers like New York, and Chicago, FM will rapidly take over and the transition period can readily be in less than two years. The public, always receptive to better equipment and service, will force the demand for FM sets when FM service becomes available. With the establishment of FM, I believe that the multiplexing of facsimile will become a better commercial combination than television for at least 10 years in smaller communities."

In 1945, Leonard Asch had said "The management of an independent FM station will require careful planning and promotion", while, in contrast, "the management of an FM station with an AM affiliation is neither expensive nor difficult". In mid-1948 WBCA acquired an AM affiliation, when WPTR, in nearby Albany, debuted, with Asch as the station's general manager, although in November 1949 he resigned from WPTR, while remaining as president of WBCA.

Control of WPTR and WBCA was assumed by Schine Chain Theaters. The addition of an AM sister station did little to improve WBCA's finances, and station advertising now showcased the AM station, with WBCA limited to passing references. Despite this, Asch remained optimistic about FM's future, and was quoted in late 1948 that "The continued degradation of AM station coverage will surely benefit FM. Also, the set manufacturers, stuck with a stagnant AM set market and TV tube shortages, as well as limited markets, must surely turn to FM set production and promotion in 1949 for volume."

In the early 1950s continuing severe financial problems due to the slow acceptance of FM radio caused the number of stations in the United States to start to decline. In April 1952 WBCA received permission to remain silent for six months, but never resumed broadcasting.
