= WSNR =

Radio station in Jersey City, New Jersey

- Jersey City, New Jersey; United States
- Broadcast area: New York metropolitan area
- Frequency: 620 kHz

Programming
- Languages: English; Russian
- Format: Brokered programming

Ownership
- Owner: Gregory Davidzon and Sam Katsman; (Davidzon Radio, Inc.)

History
- First air date: December 7, 1948
- Former call signs: WVNJ (1948–1983); WSKQ (1983–1995); WXLX (1995–1997); WJWR (1997–2001)
- Call sign meaning: Sporting News Radio (former affiliation)

Technical information
- Licensing authority: FCC
- Facility ID: 61643
- Class: B
- Power: 3,000 watts (day); 7,600 watts (night)
- Transmitter coordinates: 40°47′53.36″N 74°6′22.51″W

Links
- Public license information: Public file; LMS
- Webcast: Listen live
- Website: davidzonradio.com

WSNR (620 kHz) is a commercial radio station, licensed to Jersey City, New Jersey, and serving the New York metropolitan area. The station is co-owned by Gregory Davidzon and Sam Katsman, through licensee Davidzon Radio, Inc. Davidzon is a Russian-American media mogul who also publishes a weekly newspaper under his name.

It airs a brokered time radio format. Weekday programming consists of Russian pop music and talk shows as Davidzon Radio, named after the station's co-owner. Nighttime and weekend hours are leased to various ethnic and specialty programmers. During part of the weekend, the station airs a Caribbean format, "One Caribbean Radio".

== Broadcast signal ==
WSNR is unusual in that it runs more power at night than in the daytime, the reverse of many AM radio stations. It transmits with 3,000 watts days and 7,600 watts nights, from five nearly in-line towers in Lyndhurst, New Jersey. The signal is directed at Midtown Manhattan, as a consequence of protection requirements to adjacent-channel stations to the northeast and southwest of the transmitter site. (WTEL 610 in Philadelphia and WPRO 630 in Providence, Rhode Island, are both powered at 5,000 watts.)

With WSNR's signal pattern, the Bronx, Brooklyn and Queens are well-covered, as is Nassau County, New York, although some of New York City's northern and southern suburbs are not. This is the second transmitter site for this station. As WVNJ, licensed to Newark, New Jersey, it was powered at 5,000 watts day and night, with separate antenna patterns from a tower site in Livingston, New Jersey, near Route 10.

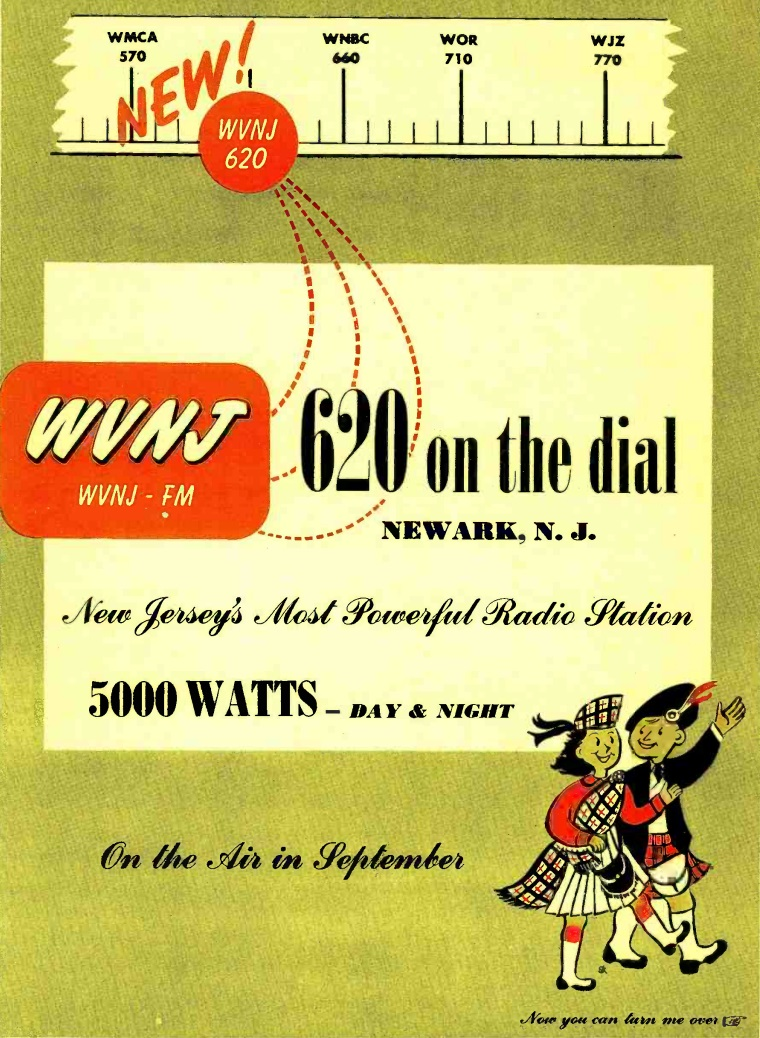
The station debuted, as WVNJ in Newark, in 1948.

== History ==
=== The WVNJ years ===
WVNJ first signed on the air December 7, 1948. It was licensed to Newark and owned by the Newark Broadcasting Company, a subsidiary of the Griffith Piano Company, to showcase its instruments. In the 1950s through 1970s, the station played Broadway and Hollywood show tunes as well as instrumental and vocal easy listening music. In 1961, then-owner Herb Saltzman acquired the license to 100.3 MHz, formerly WMGM-FM, which had been terminated in 1955. At first, Saltzman simulcast both stations, however in a few years, WVNJ-FM became an instrumental-based beautiful music station.

WVNJ AM 620 had evolved into an all-adult standards format by the early 1970s, playing artists such as Frank Sinatra, Benny Goodman, Mills Brothers, Barbra Streisand, Tony Bennett, Ella Fitzgerald, Ray Charles, Andrews Sisters, Nat "King" Cole, Peggy Lee, Artie Shaw, The Carpenters, Vic Damone, Sammy Davis Jr., Connie Francis, Patti Page, Johnny Mathis and Dinah Shore. In 1980, when WRVR (now WLTW) in New York dropped jazz programming to become country WKHK, WVNJ-FM adopted a night-time jazz format, keeping its daytime easy listening format of instrumentals and usually three vocals per hour.

At that point, WVNJ AM picked up the beautiful music format for night-time hours while keeping big bands and adult standards during the day. Ratings were low on WVNJ due to the fact it had a weak signal and WNEW (1130 AM) was also doing an adult standards format by 1981.

=== Spanish Broadcasting System ===
In August 1983, WVNJ-FM was sold to the Malrite Communications Group and became Top 40 "Z 100" WHTZ. WVNJ AM was sold that October to the Spanish Broadcasting System (SBS). The station switched to a Spanish-language adult contemporary format as WSKQ. It moved to studios in Manhattan. After SBS bought an FM station, the WSKQ call sign moved to WSKQ-FM 97.9. AM 620 became WXLX and aired a Regional Mexican music format beginning in 1990.

=== Sports radio ===
In 1997, the station was sold to One On One Sports, and it became WJWR as a full time sports radio outlet. After One on One Sports merged with the Sporting News newspaper, the network was renamed Sporting News Radio, and the call letters were then changed to WSNR.

In 2001, the station was acquired by Rose City Radio Corporation. Several New Jersey political leaders noted that Jersey City was the largest city in the nation without a commercial AM, FM or TV station. So around 2002, WSNR was re-licensed to Jersey City, coupled with a request for more nighttime power. WJWR, and later WSNR, was the flagship station for the New York Islanders hockey team, and at various times carried the play by play for the New York Liberty of the Women's National Basketball Association (WNBA), the New York CityHawks of the Arena Football League, and the Brooklyn Cyclones baseball team of the New York–Penn League.

From 2001 to 2006, the station was owned by Paul Allen's Vulcan Ventures. Despite the ownership change, it retained the station's affiliation with Sporting News Radio. The station was also briefly a Motor Racing Network (MRN) affiliate and was the only New York metro area station broadcasting NASCAR events. During this time, the station began selling blocks of time to independent producers while still airing sports the other hours of the day. From 10 a.m. to 3 p.m. weekdays, WSNR featured a big band show produced and hosted by Danny Stiles, playing only music from the 1920s, 1930s, 1940s and early 1950s.

=== Russian and ethnic programming ===
Gregory Davidzon and Sam Katsman, through licensee Davidzon Radio, Inc. purchased WSNR for $12.5 million in a transaction that was consummated on March 31, 2015. The new owners switched WSNR to Russian-language programming, with blocks of time at night and on weekends airing Caribbean, Black Gospel, Jewish, and Catholic programing.

Orthodox Jewish talk radio host Zev Brenner uses WSNR for his Talkline Communications network.
