= W8XH =

Experimental radio broadcasting station in Buffalo, New York (1934–1939)

W8XH was a radio station in Buffalo, New York, authorized by the Federal Communications Commission (FCC) as an "experimental audio station", which was owned by the Buffalo Evening News, and which operated from 1934 to 1939. It was the first apex band station, i.e. the first to transmit programming intended for the general public over what was then known as "ultra-high short-wave" frequencies. W8XH primarily simulcast programming originating from a co-owned AM radio station, WBEN, but it also aired some original programs. It ceased broadcasting in July 1939, after the newspaper began to focus on operation of an experimental facsimile broadcasting station, W8XA, which in turn shut down shortly prior to World War II and was succeeded after the war by the establishment of an FM station.

== History ==
The Buffalo Evening News first became involved with radio broadcasting in 1930, when it took over local radio station WMAK, which it renamed WBEN. WBEN's staff soon began an ambitious series of research and development. In mid-1932 WBEN was issued licenses for two low-power transmitters, W8XD on 60.0 MHz, and W8XH on 51.4 MHz, (Note: The "8" in the call signs indicated that the stations were located in the 8th radio district, while the "X" reflected their operation as experimental stations.) which were 10-watt portable units, capable of being "strapped across the shoulders of one of WBEN's engineers". At this time W8XD and W8XH were both used for remote pickups to relay programming for broadcasting by WBEN.

In the early 1930s, technical advances made it possible to transmit at much higher frequencies than before, and a number of organizations independently began applying for experimental licenses in order to investigate the potential of was then known as "ultra-high short-wave" transmissions. These signals tended to be limited to line-of-sight coverage, so there was a premium on placing antennas at high elevations, which led to the stations as a group becoming informally known as "Apex" stations.

W8XH's experimental license was upgraded from its previous status as a relay transmitter, and it became first Apex station to be used for broadcasting entertainment to the general public. Regular broadcasts under this new configuration were begun on March 18, 1934, initially at 51.4 MHz (5.8 meters), and by April it was announced that the station was broadcasting five hours a day. The next month W8XH was reassigned to 41.0 MHz (7.3 meters), which it would use for the remainder of its broadcasts.

A review of W8XH's early operations, written by a WBEN technician, summarized its activities as:

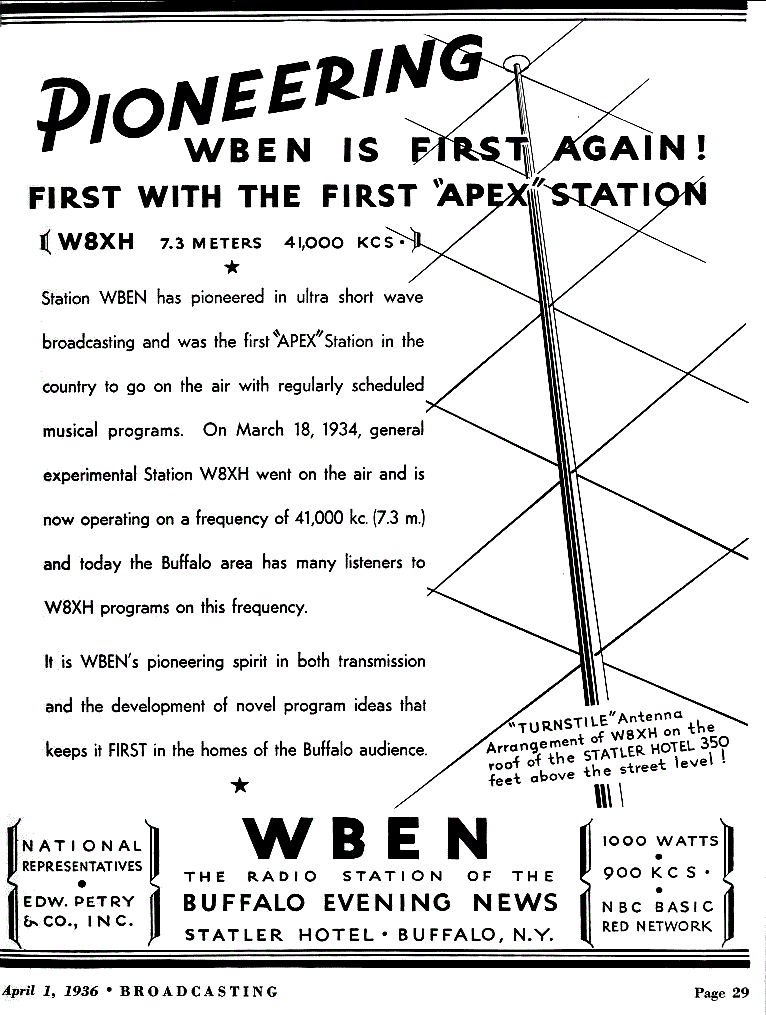
April 1936 W8XH promotional advertisement. "Turnstile" antenna is pictured on the right.

WBEN's ultra high frequency experimental work is carried on through Station W8XH, and also through W8XD, a portable, self-contained transmitter. Frequently, these stations work in conjunction but WBEN is planning exclusive programs of an interesting character for W8XH. These should be received by a constantly increasing audience because some of the leading radio manufacturers have been encouraged, by this experimental activity, to develop and offer in Western New York radio sets capable of picking up the high fidelity signal which W8XH will broadcast on 41 Megacycles, or 7.3 Meters.

When W8XH went on the air in March, 1934, WBEN announced that its objectives would be to (1) obtain higher fidelity in transmission; (2) do away with fading and static; (3) develop "on-the-spot" broadcast service by broadcasting events taking place beyond the range of telephone lines, and (4) to aid in the development of television.

It already has been ascertained that, ultra-short radio waves—those below nine meters—have tremendous penetrating powers. For instance, ultra-short radio waves are received with no apparent fading when traveling through a steel tunnel, or under railway viaducts. Persons with receivers in their automobiles are well aware of the fading from these two causes when listening to regular broadcast bands. And, it also has been discovered that reception of ultra-short waves is about the same day or night, winter or summer, and that perfect reception is possible even during thunder storms—barring, of course, man-made interference which is subject to control or elimination.

— Earnest H. Roy, "WBEN Continues To Pioneer In Ultra Short Wave Broadcasting", Radio Log: 1935-1936 (published by the Buffalo Evening News, Stations WBEN and W8XH), October 1, 1935, page 3.

Because W8XH was operating under an experimental license, original programming had to be commercial-free. However, programs simulcast from WBEN were allowed to include the original commercials. W8XH underwent a major upgrade in January 1936, with the installation of a new 100-watt RCA designed transmitter, that fed into a crossed-dipole antenna, known as a "turnstile antenna", that had been developed by RCA's Dr. G. H. Brown. The antenna was mounted on a 70-foot (21 m) pole atop the Hotel Statler, 350 feet (105 m) above ground. (W8XH's original transmitter was donated to the Smithsonian Institution.)

Although operating on a frequency expected to be high enough to eliminate skywave signals, under certain solar conditions the ionosphere became reflective enough to affect W8XH's transmissions, and in April 1937 station engineers were shocked to receive two reception reports from listeners across the Atlantic Ocean in England.

In October 1937, it was announced that W8XH's hours had expanded from five to seventeen hours a day. However, eventually the station's programming, especially programs separate from WBEN, began to decline. On March 4, 1939 a new schedule was announced of 6:30 p.m. to midnight, daily except weekends. There apparently was no formal announcement when W8XH ultimately ended operations. The July 3, 1939 issue of the Buffalo Evening News listed it as relaying the National Broadcasting Company (NBC) Red Network programming carried by WBEN from 1:00 to 5:00 and 5:45 to 9:00 p.m. However, two days later references to the station ceased. In addition, although W8XH had been included in the Apex station lists in the 1938 and 1939 editions of Broadcasting Yearbook, it did not appear in the January 15, 1940 listing included in the 1940 edition. The station would have been ordered off the air by the end of the year as all remaining Apex stations were in 1940.

In December 1938, the News began a regular facsimile broadcast service, initially transmitted by WBEN during overnight hours. Facsimile broadcasting employed dedicated equipment to receive the transmissions and print a special edition of the newspaper, that was limited to a few pages. In April 1939, the News announced that it had received a license to transfer the transmissions from WBEN to a new "experimental facsimile broadcasting station", W8XA, which employed much of the equipment originally used by W8XH. By August the new station was operating on 43.7 MHz. The FCC ordered the Apex band and all of its stations to be cleared to make way for frequency modulated (FM) stations by January 1, 1941; the News complied and shut W8XA down in December 1940.

WBEN was awarded a new license to broadcast using FM in 1944 at 43.3 MHz, a short distance down from W8XA. This FM station would not reach the air, but by 1946, its license (now moved up into the standard FM broadcast band) was used for a new station. This license remains active as K-Love station WBKV, which only separated from common ownership with WBEN in 2023.
