= W8XWJ =

Experimental radio broadcasting station in Detroit, Michigan (1936–1940)

W8XWJ was an "experimental audio broadcasting station" in Detroit, Michigan, owned by the Detroit News, which operated from 1936 to 1940. It was classified as an Apex broadcasting station, i.e. it provided programming intended for the general public over what were then known as "ultra-high" frequencies, later the high end of the short wave band. W8XWJ primarily broadcast unique programming, although it sometimes simulcast programs originating from co-owned AM station WWJ. In April 1940, W8XWJ was shut down, in order to be converted to a commercial FM station.

== History ==
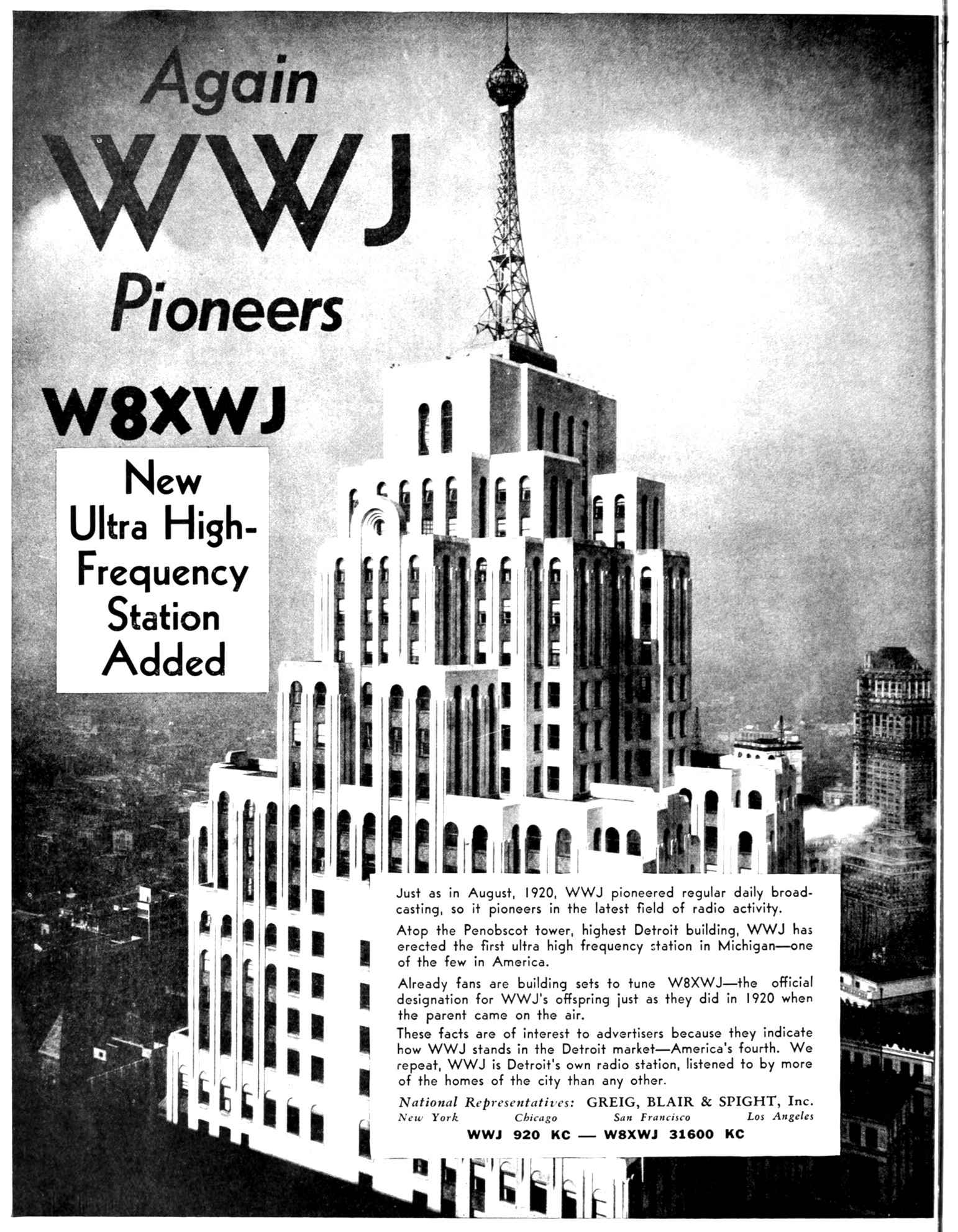
February 1936 promotional advertisement for W8XWJ

W8XWJ made its debut on January 29, 1936, as an AM station broadcasting on 31.6 MHz. Its start received national attention, with Variety calling the debut "a choice affair".

A promotional review of W8XWJ's early operations summarized its activities as:

W8XWJ, The Detroit News ultra high frequency transmitter, is located atop the 47-story Penobscot Building in the center of downtown Detroit. It consists of an RCA 100-watt transmitter operating on a frequency of 31.6 megacycles or 9.48 meters. It operates on a regular daily schedule and serves also as a contact point for The Detroit News airplane, the Early Bird, and the Radio and Photographic Field Car. When television becomes a practical reality, W8XWJ with its location and frequency will be ideally equipped for visual transmission. Experiments in the transmission of facsimile pictures are now being conducted.

— "W8XWJ", WWJ, America's Oldest Broadcasting Station, 1936, page 25.

In late 1937 the Federal Communications Commission (FCC) formally set aside a band of 75 frequencies for use by "Apex" broadcasting stations, and the following January W8XWJ was assigned to 42.06 MHz. The station also announced that it had upgraded its transmitter from 100 to 500 watts and was broadcasting fourteen hours a day, with most of its programming unique to the station.

A major restriction on the Apex band stations was that, because they were operating under experimental authorizations, they could not run commercials, except when rebroadcasting programming from an existing station. In 1938 it was reported that station general manager William Scripps was promoting the idea of creating commercial licenses for Apex stations, but this was not done.

In the late 1930s the FCC determined that for most purposes FM transmissions were superior to the AM (amplitude modulation) employed by the Apex stations, and began to shut down the existing experimental grants. On May 18, 1940, the commission issued "Order No. 67", which would allocate the frequencies from 42 to 50 MHz to a new commercial FM station band effective January 1, 1941. Its subsequent "Order No. 69" included W8XWJ in a list of stations to be deleted by a January 1 deadline.

However, in anticipation of the FCC's actions the Detroit News had already begun the process of replacing W8XWJ with an FM station, and had ended its broadcasts on April 13, 1940. Beginning on May 13, 1941, the upgraded facility, employing W8XWJ's former Penobscot Building studios and transmitter site, returned to the airwaves as Michigan's first FM station, W45D (now WXYT-FM).
