= WMGM-FM (New York City) =

Radio station in New York City (1942–1955)

- New York City; United States
- Frequency: 100.3 MHz

Ownership
- Owner: Metro-Goldwyn-Mayer; (Loew's, Inc.)
- Sister stations: WMGM

History
- First air date: June 1, 1942
- Last air date: February 1955
- Former call signs: W63NY (1942–1943); WHNF (1943–1946)
- Former frequencies: 46.3 MHz (1941–1945)

WMGM-FM was a radio station in New York City, broadcasting on 100.3 MHz. It was owned by Loew's, Inc., a subsidiary of the Metro-Goldwyn-Mayer film studio alongside radio station WMGM, which was previously WHN. One of New York's earliest FM outlets, WMGM-FM broadcast from 1942 to 1955.

== History ==
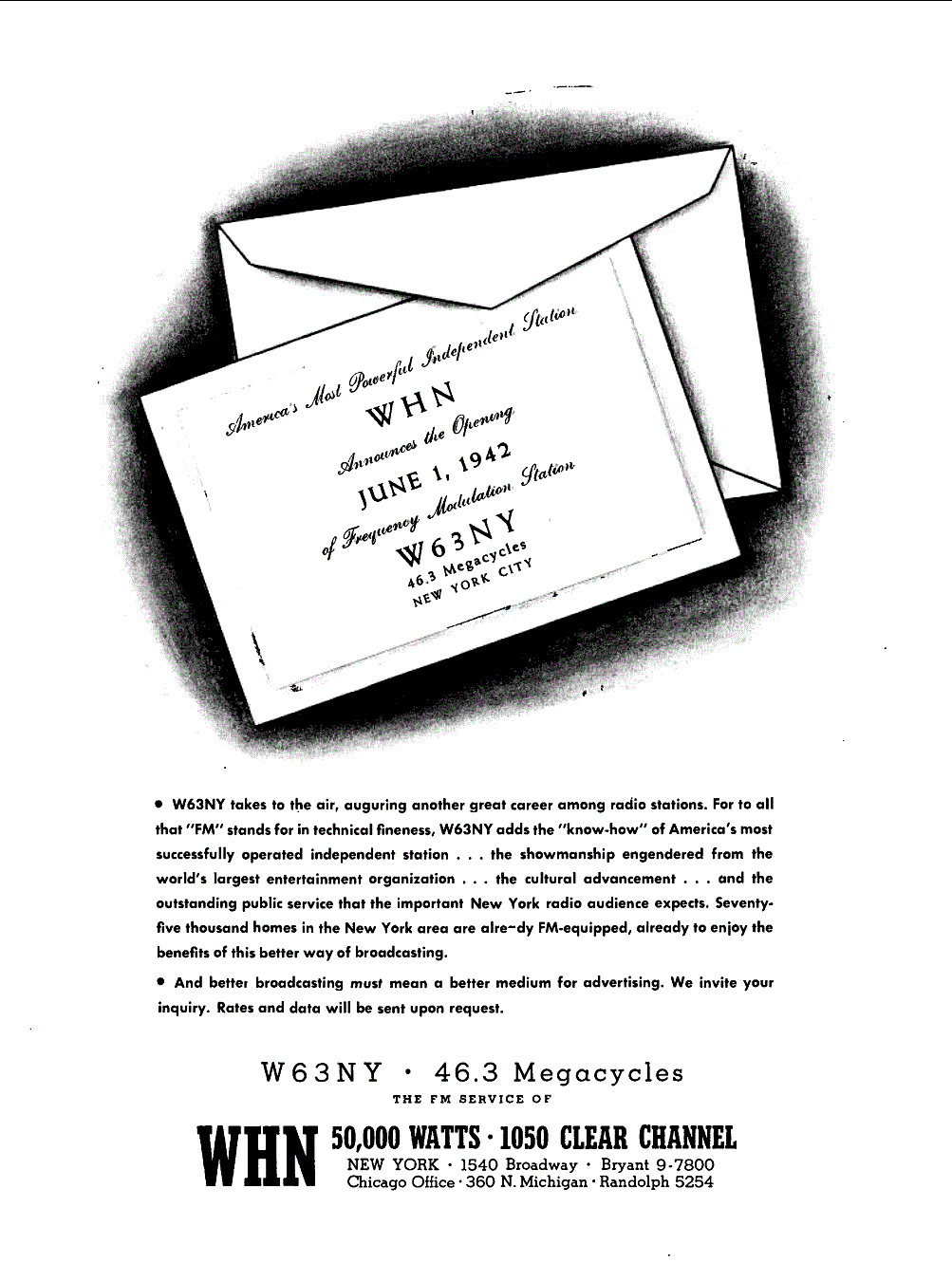
W63NY debuted on June 1, 1942, as a companion to AM station WHN.

In May 1940, the Federal Communications Commission (FCC) announced the establishment, effective January 1, 1941, of an FM radio band operating on 40 channels spanning 42–50 MHz. The first fifteen commercial FM station construction permits were issued on October 31, 1940, including four to New York City applicants. The Marcus Lowe Booking Agency was authorized for a station at 46.3 MHz, which debuted on June 1, 1942, as the fourth FM broadcaster in New York City, with the call sign W63NY. The original call sign policy for commercial FM stations included an initial "W" for stations located east of the Mississippi River, followed by the last two digits of a station's frequency assignment, "63" in this case, and closing with a one or two character regional identifier, which for New York City-area stations was "NY".

The transmitter was located in Palisades Park in New Jersey, opposite Grant's Tomb, and the station broadcast seven hours a day of programs, mixing recorded classical and semi-classical music with AM station WHN's baseball coverage and occasional musical programs from the WHN studios. Effective November 1, 1943, the FCC modified its policy for FM callsigns, and the call sign was changed to WHNF, reflecting its co-ownership with WHN.

The FM broadcasting band was relocated from 42–50 MHz to 88–108 MHz in late 1945. WHNF went off the air on December 1 in order to conduct its move to the new frequency of 100.3 MHz. By this time, the station aired no live musical programs whatsoever. The station was still off air at the start of 1946. Several months later, on April 18, WHNF changed its callsign to WMGM. The new designation, recognizing the ownership of the stations by the Metro-Goldwyn-Mayer studio through Loew's, Inc., was then adopted in September 1948 by the AM outlet, at which time WMGM became WMGM-FM. The station spent another month off air in January 1947 to install a new antenna. Few people listened, even among the scant 3 percent of metropolitan area residents who had an FM receiver, as WMGM placed last in a Pulse ratings survey of New York FM listeners with a 2.3 share.

In 1950, the station did have one star performer in its lineup. Jack Eigen, who later hosted an eponymous television show on the DuMont Television Network, was a disc jockey for WMGM AM and FM, with the midnight to 1 a.m. hour airing exclusively on FM. The show originated from the Copacabana.

WMGM-FM continued to operate until around February 1955, when the station surrendered its license to the FCC. It was evidently a decision the company soon regretted, as in 1958, WMGM Broadcasting Corporation filed for a construction permit for 100.3 MHz. However, a competing applicant was in the way: the Newark Broadcasting Company, owner of WVNJ (620 AM) across the river in Newark, New Jersey. The FCC ruled in 1959 to award the station to Newark, stating that a second Class B FM station for that city was more desirable and equitable than a 14th such service for New York City. This cleared the way for the current 100.3 license, today's WHTZ, to begin as WVNJ-FM on June 1, 1961.
