= Apex (radio band) =

1930s–1940s radio band

Apex radio stations (also known as skyscraper and pinnacle) was the name commonly given to a short-lived group of United States broadcasting stations, which were used to evaluate transmitting on frequencies that were much higher than the ones used by standard amplitude modulation (AM) and shortwave stations. Their name came from the tall height of their transmitter antennas, which were needed because coverage was primarily limited to local line-of-sight distances. These stations were assigned to what at the time were described as "ultra-high shortwave" frequencies, between roughly 25 and 44 MHz. They employed amplitude modulation (AM) transmissions, although in most cases using a wider bandwidth than standard broadcast band AM stations, in order to provide high fidelity sound with less static and distortion.

In 1937 the Federal Communications Commission (FCC) formally allocated an Apex station band, consisting of 75 transmitting frequencies running from 41.02 to 43.98 MHz. These stations were never given permission to operate commercially, although they were allowed to retransmit programming from standard AM stations. Most operated under experimental licenses, however this band was the first to include a formal "non-commercial educational" station classification.

The FCC eventually concluded that frequency modulation (FM) transmissions were superior, and the Apex band was eliminated effective January 1, 1941, in order to make way for the creation of the original FM band, assigned to 42 to 50 MHz.

== Initial development ==
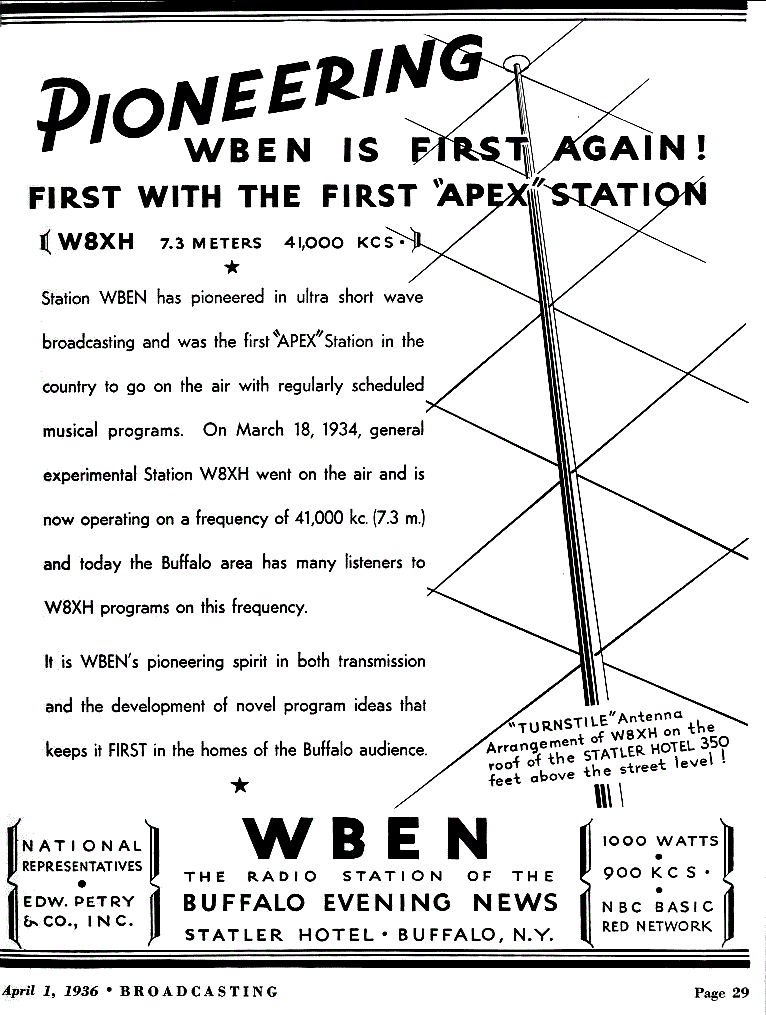
In March 1934 W8XH in Buffalo, New York became the first "Apex" station to make broadcasts intended for the general public.

During the 1920s and 1930s, radio engineers and government regulators investigated the characteristics of transmitting frequencies higher than those currently in use. In the United States, by 1930 the original AM broadcasting band consisted of 96 frequencies from 550 to 1500 kHz, with a 10 kHz spacing between adjacent assignments. On this band, a station's coverage during the daytime consisted exclusively of its groundwave signal, which for the most powerful stations might exceed 200 miles (320 kilometers), although it was significantly less for the average station. However, during the nighttime, changes in the ionosphere resulted in additional long distance skywave signals, that were commonly reflected for up to hundreds of kilometers.

Over time, technology was developed to transmit on progressively higher frequencies. (Although initially these were in general called "ultra-high shortwave" frequencies, radio spectrum nomenclature was later standardized, with 3 to 30 MHz transmissions becoming known as "High Frequency" (HF), 30 to 300 MHz called "Very High Frequency" (VHF), and 300 to 3,000 MHz called "Ultra High Frequency" (UHF)). It soon became apparent that there were significant differences in the propagation characteristics of various frequency ranges. Signals from shortwave stations, operating roughly in the range from 5 MHz to 20 MHz, were found to be readily reflected by the ionosphere during both the day and at night, resulting in stations that sometimes could transmit halfway around the world.

Investigations of increasingly higher frequencies found that, above around 20 MHz, signal propagation by both groundwave and skywave generally became minimal, which meant that station coverage now began to be limited to just line-of-sight distances from the transmitting antenna. This was considered to be a valuable characteristic by the FCC, because it would allow the establishment of broadcasting stations with limited but consistent day and night coverage, that could only be received by their local communities. It also meant that multiple stations could operate on the same frequency throughout the country without interfering with each other.

Because the standard AM broadcast band was considered to be too full to allow any meaningful increase in the number of stations, the FCC began to issue licenses to parties interested in testing the suitability of higher frequencies. Most Apex stations operated under experimental licenses, and were commonly affiliated with and subsidized by a commercially licensed AM station. Until the late 1930s, commercially made radio receivers did not cover these high frequencies, so early Apex station listeners constructed their own receivers, or built converters for existing models.

On March 18, 1934, W8XH in Buffalo, New York, a companion station to AM station WBEN, became the first Apex station to air a regular schedule. Although most of these stations merely retransmitted the programs of their AM station partners, in a few cases efforts were made to provide original programming. In 1936, The Milwaukee Journal's W9XAZ, which initially had relayed the programming of WTMJ, became the first Apex station to originate its own programming on a regular basis.

While monitoring the first group of stations, it was soon realized that, due to the strengthening of the ionosphere during periods of high solar activity, at times the lower end of the VHF frequencies would produce strong, and undesirable, skywave signals. (The December 1937 issue of All-Wave Radio reported that W6XKG in Los Angeles, transmitting on 25.95 MHz, had been heard in both Asia and Europe, while W9XAZ, 26.4 MHz in Milwaukee, Wisconsin had "a strong signal in Australia", and W8XAI, 31.6 MHz in Rochester, New York, "is another station that is often heard in Australia.") This most commonly occurred during the summer months, and during peaks in the 11-year sunspot cycle. This determination led to the FCC moving the developing broadcasting service stations, which by now began to include experimental FM radio and TV stations, to higher frequencies that were less affected by solar influences.

== Apex band establishment (1937) ==
In October 1937, the FCC announced a sweeping allocation of frequency assignments for the various competing services, including television, relay, and public service, which covered 10 kHz to 300 MHz. Included was a band of Apex stations, consisting of 75 channels with 40 kHz separations, and spanning from 41.02 to 43.98 MHz. The 40 kHz spacing between adjacent frequencies was four times as much as the 10 kHz spacing on the standard AM broadcast band, which reduced adjacent-frequency interference, and provided more bandwidth for high-fidelity programming.

At the time it was estimated that there were about 50 Apex-style stations currently in operation, although transmitting on a variety of frequencies. In January 1938 the band's first 25 channels, from 41.02 to 41.98 MHz, were reserved for non-commercial educational stations, with the Cleveland City Board of Education's WBOE in Cleveland, Ohio, (Note: WBOE suspended operations in October 1978, with the license deleted by the FCC in September 1982; frequency is currently in use by WCLV.) the first station to begin operation within this group.

== Apex band assignments (1937–1941) ==
Frequency	Station assignments
41.02 MHz	W8XH – Buffalo, New York: Buffalo Evening News/WBEN (1934–1939)
41.06 MHz	n/a; unused
41.10 MHz	WCNY/WNYE – Brooklyn, New York: New York City Board of Education (1939–1941)
41.14 MHz	n/a; unused
41.18 MHz	n/a; unused
41.22 MHz	n/a; unused
41.26 MHz	n/a; unused
41.30 MHz	n/a; unused
41.34 MHz	n/a; unused
41.38 MHz	n/a; unused
41.42 MHz	n/a; unused
41.46 MHz	n/a; unused
41.50 MHz	WBOE – Cleveland, Ohio: Cleveland City Board of Education (1938–1941)
41.54 MHz	n/a; unused
41.58 MHz	n/a; unused
41.62 MHz	n/a; unused
41.66 MHz	n/a; unused
41.70 MHz	n/a; unused
41.74 MHz	n/a; unused
41.78 MHz	n/a; unused
41.82 MHz	n/a; unused
41.86 MHz	n/a; unused
41.90 MHz	n/a; unused
41.94 MHz	n/a; unused
41.98 MHz	n/a; unused
42.02 MHz	n/a; unused
42.06 MHz	W8XWJ – Detroit, Michigan: Evening News Association/WWJ (1936–1940)
42.10 MHz	n/a; unused
42.14 MHz	W3XIR – Philadelphia, Pennsylvania: WCAU Broadcasting Co./WCAU (1938–1941)
42.18 MHz	W2XWF – New York, New York: William G. H. Finch (1940–1941)
42.22 MHz	W1XKA – Boston, Massachusetts: Westinghouse E. & M. Co./WBZ (1940–1941)
42.26 MHz	W9XAZ – Milwaukee, Wisconsin: The Journal Co./WTMJ (1940–1941)
42.30 MHz	W6XDA – Los Angeles, California: Columbia Broadcasting System/KNX (1940)
42.30 MHz	W6XRE – Los Angeles, California: Ben S. McGlashan/KGFJ (1940)
42.30 MHz	W9XHW – Minneapolis, Minnesota: Columbia Broadcasting System/WCCO (1939–1940)
42.30 MHz	W1XEQ – New Bedford, Massachusetts: E. Anthony & Sons/WNBH (1940)
42.30 MHz	W2XDV – New York, New York: Columbia Broadcasting System/WABC (1940)
42.34 MHz	W1XER – Mount Washington, New Hampshire: Yankee Network (1940–1941)
42.34 MHz	W8XNT – Cleveland, Ohio: United Broadcasting Co./WHK (1940)
42.38 MHz	W1XKB – Springfield, Massachusetts: Westinghouse E. & M. Co./WBZA (1940)
42.42 MHz	n/a; unused
42.46 MHz	W1XEH – Hartford, Connecticut: Travelers Broadcasting Service Corp./WTIC (1940–1941)
42.46 MHz	W9XER – Kansas City, Missouri: Midland Broadcasting Co./KMBC (1940–1941)
42.50 MHz	n/a; unused
42.54 MHz	n/a; unused
42.58 MHz	n/a; unused
42.62 MHz	n/a; unused
42.66 MHz	n/a; unused
42.70 MHz	n/a; unused
42.74 MHz	n/a; unused
42.78 MHz	n/a; unused
42.82 MHz	n/a; unused
42.86 MHz	n/a; unused
42.90 MHz	WBKY – Beattyville, Kentucky: University of Kentucky (1940–1944)
42.94 MHz	n/a; unused
42.98 MHz	n/a; unused
43.02 MHz	n/a; unused
43.06 MHz	n/a; unused
43.10 MHz	n/a; unused
43.14 MHz	n/a; unused
43.18 MHz	n/a; unused
43.22 MHz	n/a; unused
43.26 MHz	n/a; unused
43.30 MHz	n/a; unused
43.34 MHz	n/a; unused
43.38 MHz	n/a; unused
43.42 MHz	n/a; unused
43.46 MHz	n/a; unused
43.50 MHz	n/a; unused
43.54 MHz	n/a; unused
43.58 MHz	n/a; unused
43.62 MHz	n/a; unused
43.66 MHz	n/a; unused
43.70 MHz	n/a; unused
43.74 MHz	n/a; unused
43.78 MHz	n/a; unused
43.82 MHz	n/a; unused
43.84 MHz	n/a; unused
43.92 MHz	n/a; unused
43.96 MHz	n/a; unused
43.98 MHz	n/a; unused

== Conversion to FM (1941) ==
At the time the Apex band was established, the FCC noted that "The Commission at an early date will consider carefully the needs and requirements for high-frequency broadcast stations using both conventional [AM] modulation and frequency modulation". As of January 15, 1940, only 2 non-commercial and 14 experimental stations held Apex band licenses, all of which were assigned operating frequencies in the bottom half of the band. (A similar number of experimental stations held grants for frequencies in the 25–26 MHz region.) In addition, at this same time 20 experimental FM stations had been assigned slots within the top half of the Apex band frequencies.

The commission's studies soon found significant advantages to FM transmissions over the Apex AM signals. Sound quality, and especially resistance to interference from static, including from lightning, was found to be far superior for FM. Although FM assignments required five times the bandwidth of Apex stations (200 kHz vs. 40 kHz), the "capture effect" allowed FM stations operating on the same frequency to be spaced closer together than Apex stations. By 1939 the FCC began encouraging Apex stations to consider changing to the technically superior FM transmissions. In May 1940, the FCC decided to authorize a commercial FM band effective January 1, 1941, operating on 40 channels spanning 42–50 MHz. (This was later changed to 88–106 MHz, and still later to 88–108 MHz, which increased the number of channels to 100.)

This new assignment also resulted in the elimination of the Apex band, and the Apex stations were informed that they needed to either go silent or convert to FM. With this change, a few of the original Apex stations were converted into some of the earliest FM stations. The three educational stations were allowed some leeway in making the conversion to FM, with WBOE switching over in February 1941, WNYE receiving permission to continue as an Apex station until June 29, 1941, and WBKY receiving a series of authorizations to continue using its AM transmitter until May 1, 1944. Currently, the frequencies that had been used by the Apex band are allocated for land mobile communication.

There would be at least one attempt to revive the Apex band concept. Beginning in May 1946, consulting radio engineer Sarkes Tarzian operated a 200-watt experimental AM station, W9XHZ, on 87.75 MHz in Bloomington, Indiana. After two years of successful operation of what he referred to as his "HIFAM" station, in 1948 he proposed that the FCC allocate a small high-frequency broadcast band, 400 kHz wide with 10 kHz spacing between frequency assignments. Tarzian promoted this as a low-cost alternative to expensive FM transmitters and receivers, saying that a $5.95 converter could be added to existing AM radios that would allow them to pick up the HIFAM stations. He continued to operate his experimental station, which eventually became KS2XAP, until 1950, although by then its transmitting hours were greatly restricted, as the FCC required the station to remain off the air whenever nearby WFBM-TV in Indianapolis was broadcasting. This was due to the fact that the TV station's audio transmitter used the same frequency as Tarzian's station. Moreover, after his station's final license expired on June 1, 1950, the FCC denied Tarzian any further renewals, concluding it would not reverse its earlier determination that there was no need for a second AM broadcast band.

== See also ==
- W2XMN
