= List of Buffalo Sabres records =

This is a list of franchise records for the Buffalo Sabres, the professional ice hockey team based in Buffalo, New York. They are members of the Atlantic Division of the Eastern Conference of the National Hockey League (NHL).

The Sabres first joined the league as an expansion team in 1970.

== Career leaders ==
Statistics as of the end of the 2025–26 season

=== Regular season ===
	Career leader		Active leader	
Games	Gilbert Perreault	1,191	Rasmus Dahlin	586
Goals	Gilbert Perreault	512	Tage Thompson	213
Assists	Gilbert Perreault	814	Rasmus Dahlin	332
Points	Gilbert Perreault	1,326	Rasmus Dahlin	434
Plus-minus	Craig Ramsay	+324	Mattias Samuelsson	+44
Penalties in minutes	Rob Ray	3,189	Rasmus Dahlin	454
Hat tricks	Rick Martin	20	Tage Thompson	9
Goaltender games	Ryan Miller	540	Ukko-Pekka Luukkonen	190
Goaltender wins	Ryan Miller	284	Ukko-Pekka Luukkonen	93
Goaltender minutes	Ryan Miller	31,661:01	Ukko-Pekka Luukkonen	10,911:12
Goals against average	Dominik Hasek	2.22	Alex Lyon	2.77
Save percentage	Dominik Hasek	.926	Alex Lyon	.907
Saves	Ryan Miller	14,847	Ukko-Pekka Luukkonen	4,834
Shutouts	Dominik Hasek	55	Ukko-Pekka Luukkonen	8
Coaching wins	Lindy Ruff	657	Lindy Ruff	657

=== Postseason ===
	Career leader		Active leader	
Games	Gilbert Perreault	90	12 tied	13
Goals	Gilbert Perreault	33	Zach Benson; Tage Thompson	5
Assists	Gilbert Perreault	70	Rasmus Dahlin; Tage Thompson	10
Points	Gilbert Perreault	103	Tage Thompson	15
Plus-minus	Jocelyn Guevremont	+22	Zach Benson; Josh Doan	+6
Penalties in minutes	Rob Ray	169	Zach Benson	64
Hat tricks	7 tied	1	N/A	N/A
Goaltender games	Dominik Hasek	68	Alex Lyon	10
Goaltender wins	Dominik Hasek	37	Alex Lyon	4
Goaltender minutes	Dominik Hasek	4,290:16	Alex Lyon	463:26
Goals against average	Andrei Trefilov	0.00	Alex Lyon	2.59
Save percentage	Andrei Trefilov	1.000	Alex Lyon	.904
Saves	Dominik Hasek	1,933	Alex Lyon	189
Shutouts	Dominik Hasek	6	N/A	N/A
Coaching wins	Lindy Ruff	64	Lindy Ruff	64

== Single season records ==
=== Team ===
	Total	Year
Wins	53	2006–07
Points	113	1974-75, 2006–07
Most goals for	354	1974–75
Fewest goals for^{†}	157	2013–14
Fewest goals against^{†}	175	1998–99
Most goals against	308	1986–87

^{†}Excluding the lockout-shortened 1994-95 and 2012-13 seasons

=== Skaters ===
	Player	Total	Year
Goals	Alexander Mogilny	76	1992–93
Assists	Pat LaFontaine	95	1992–93
Points	Pat LaFontaine	148	1992–93
Plus-Minus	Don Luce	+61	1974–75
Penalties in Minutes	Rob Ray	354	1991–92
Points (Defenceman)	Phil Housley	81	1989–90
Points (Rookie)	Rick Martin	74	1971–72
Points streak	Gilbert Perreault	18 games (31 points)	1971–72

=== Goalies ===
	Player	Total	Year
Games played	Ryan Miller	76	2007–08
Minutes played	Ryan Miller	4,474:18	2007–08
Wins	Ryan Miller	41	2009–10
Losses	Roger Crozier	34	1971–72
Shutouts	Dominik Hasek	13	1997–98
Lowest GAA	Dominik Hasek	1.87	1998–99
Highest SV%	Dominik Hasek	.937	1998–99
