= The French Connection (ice hockey) =

Buffalo Sabres line

The French Connection is the nickname of a forward line that played for the Buffalo Sabres of the National Hockey League from 1972 until 1979. The line consisted of Hall of Famer Gilbert Perreault at centre and All-Stars Rick Martin and René Robert at left wing and right wing, respectively. All three players were French-Canadians from Quebec: Perreault from Victoriaville; Robert from Trois-Rivières; and Martin from Verdun. The name referred both to the origins of the players and to the 1971 movie The French Connection, based upon the book of the same name.

Perreault and Martin were the first-round draft picks of the Sabres in the franchise's first two years, while Robert was acquired in a trade late in the Sabres' second season. The trio accounted for most of Buffalo's scoring during their seven years together, amassing a total of 1,681 points over 1,536 man-games from 1972 to 1979, while leading the Sabres to the franchise's first appearance in the Stanley Cup Final in 1975. They continue to hold many of the franchise's scoring records. Each member of the French Connection was named to the official NHL All-Star team at least once and to the NHL All-Star Game at least twice while playing together.

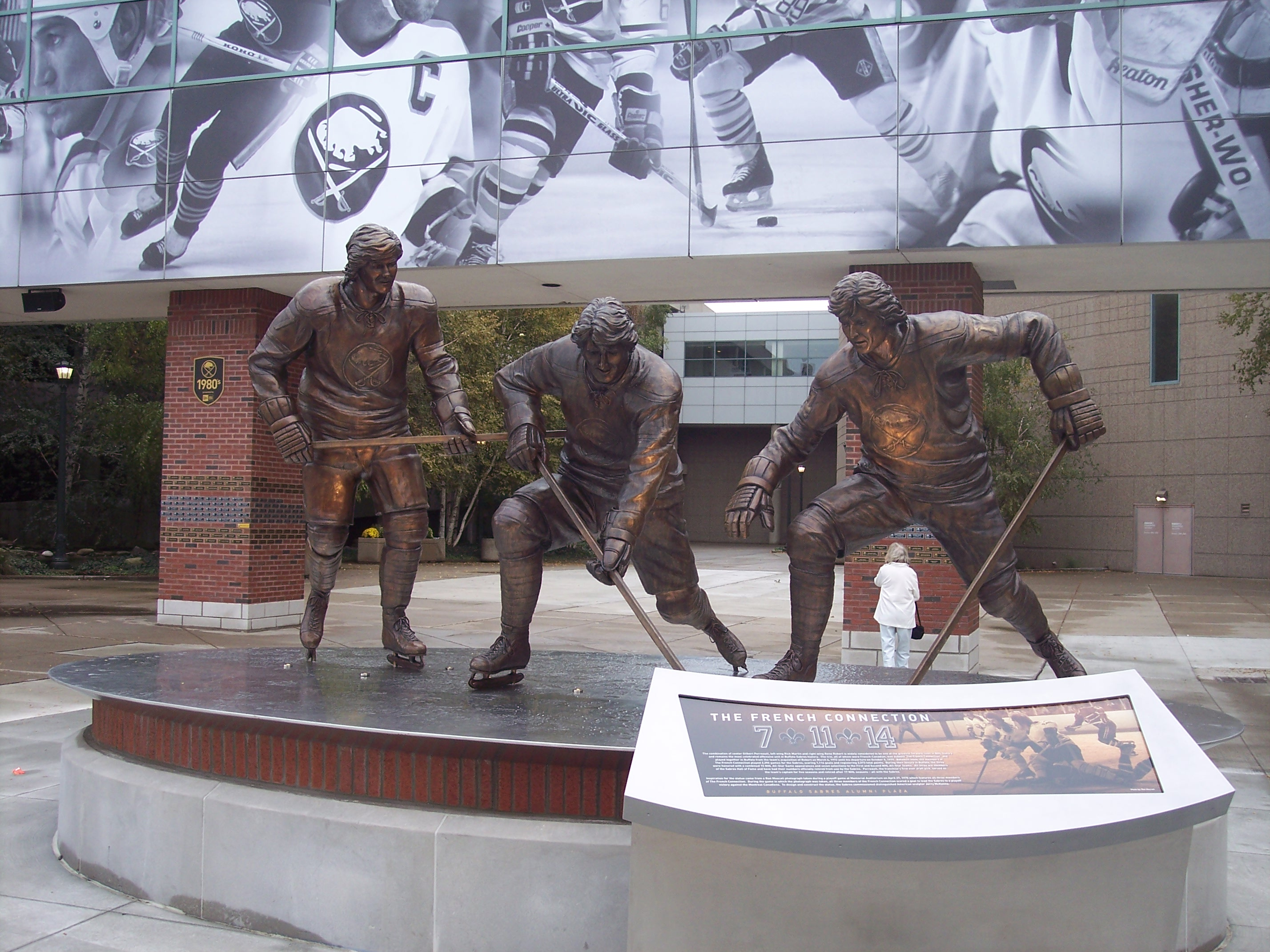
A bronze statue of the French Connection at KeyBank Center, Buffalo, New York

== History ==
Perreault was acquired by the team with their first draft pick of their inaugural season in the 1970 entry draft. Martin followed the next year as the team's first pick in 1971. Both players were drafted after three seasons with the Montreal Junior Canadiens. Robert was acquired in a trade on March 4, 1972, for Eddie Shack. He played twelve games for the Sabres during the 1971–72 NHL season. Perreault played his entire 17-season career with the Sabres. Martin played all but four games of his injury-shortened 11-season career with the Sabres. The trio played together as a line most of the time until the fall of 1979. On October 5, 1979, Scotty Bowman traded Robert to the Colorado Rockies for defenseman John Van Boxmeer. This ended the French Connection era in Buffalo, but not before the trio became the first three players to accumulate 200 goals in a Sabres uniform. Each player's jerseys were retired; Perreault's #11 was retired during a ceremony on October 17, 1990, and Robert's #14 and Martin's #7 were retired on November 15, 1995. All three numbers hang together from the KeyBank Center rafters under a French Connection banner.

In hopes of averting the lean years that troubled most expansion teams, Punch Imlach, the Sabres first coach and general manager, attempted to build a high-scoring club to excite the local hockey fans. Perreault was regarded as a smooth skater and tremendous stickhandler. Perreault was chosen to be the franchise player around which a team could be built and succeed. Although Martin and Perreault had played two years together with the Montreal Junior Canadiens (Perreault even lived with Martin's family during the 1969–70 season), they had never played on the same line before being paired in Buffalo. Since Martin was one of the few who could keep up with Perreault as a skater they were paired together after the Sabres drafted Martin. It was clear during the 1971–72 season that Perreault and Martin were a natural pairing. Sabres coach Joe Crozier felt the two just needed a third player who would stay high and check. Sabres coach quickly teamed Robert with Perreault and Martin after the trade. The two players complemented Perreault and became a dynamic combination that dazzled fans.

There are differing claims as to who dubbed the hockey line “The French Connection” as a reference to the Academy Award-winning film. Origination of the term was often given to writer Lee Coppola when he was operating the Buffalo Auditorium message board and who later became Dean of Journalism at St. Bonaventure University. Credit is also given to WKBW TV's Rick Azar, the Dean of TV sportscasters in Buffalo, who used it first on a 6pm Eyewitness News sportscast and references it in his 2014 book, Tales from Azar's Attic. A half century later, Erik Brady, in his July 22, 2021, Buffalo News column on who first named the French Connection line, suggested "maybe the answer is both, independent of one another." However, two people who were there at the time and in positions to know the answer both attributed the origin of the name to Lee Coppola. Rick Martin, one of the 3 members of the French Connection was quoted as saying, "A Buffalo newspaperman named Lee Coppola used to work part-time writing messages on the light boards that hung on the balcony faces in Memorial Aud. Late in the season, I looked up after a goal we scored as a line, and there he had written something like, 'Rick from Bert and Rene . . . It's a French Connection.' Actually, I don't remember which of us scored that goal, but from that night on, we were the French Connection." Also, Paul Wieland was the first Pulic Relations Director for the Sabres and held that position throughout the years that the French Connection skated together. So, it was literally his job to know what was being written and said about the Sabres. He often credited Lee Coppola as being the man "who tagged them with the nickname [French Connection]."

The trio played together as a regular line through the 1974–75 season. At times, they were split up during the last four seasons. When they played together they often faced the opposition's top defensive lineups. Since the trio were tremendous skating scoring threats these opponents would concentrate on checking them and staying on top of them. For example, against the Montreal Canadiens Bob Gainey's line would oppose them. Rick Martin once said about this line "I had Jimmy Roberts between me and my shadow."

Perreault was considered a naturally gifted skater and playmaker who was capable of making an end-to-end rush at any time. Martin was considered the "marksman" due to his wristshot and slapshot. Robert was known for his "blinding speed and lethal shot". He made his mark with the French Connection, as a highly regarded powerplay point men, and on the second line penalty killing unit.

The trio led the Sabres to the Stanley Cup playoffs every full season they were together, except the 1973–73 season when Perreault suffered a broken leg and only played in 55 games. The impact of the combination was obvious as the team began the first full season of the French Connection era with a ten-game unbeaten streak; the team made the playoffs for the first time in the history of the franchise and the three members of the French Connection were the team's three leading scorers. The team suddenly went unbeaten in their first 21 home games, while setting a record for post 1967 expansion teams by recording a home winning streak of 12 and while going unbeaten in New York state for 25 games including one win at Nassau Coliseum and three at Madison Square Garden. Their first playoff appearance during their first full season together (1972–73) was not only the franchise's first playoff appearance, but the series also marked history as the only NHL playoff series with brothers (Ken Dryden and Dave Dryden) as opposing goaltenders. In the first game of the series, both goaltenders were chosen as being among the three stars of the game. During the 1974–75 NHL season, all members of the trio were selected to play in the NHL All-Star game; they all finished among the top ten in league scoring, and they led the team to a tie for first place in the regular season standings.

Among their postseason highlights was the May 20, 1975, game three of the 1975 Stanley Cup Final. This game, known as the fog game, was memorable because Buffalo Memorial Auditorium had no air conditioning and the arena temperature matched the 90 degree outdoor temperature, which caused fog to shroud the ice surface. During the overtime, play was delayed seven times due to fog on the ice surface at the Buffalo Memorial Auditorium. The players were instructed by Flyers coach Fred Shero and Sabres coach Floyd Smith to shoot whenever possible because of the impaired goaltender vision. Eventually, the French connection combined to score a Martin to Perreault to Robert game-winning goal. This came after the French Connection swarmed Flyer goalie enabling Bill Hajt to knock in a Rick Martin rebound to send the game to overtime.

The 1975–76 season would also be memorable for the trio and the franchise. On January 4, 1976, the Sabres hosted part of the two-team eight-game NHL tour by the opposing the Soviet Wings. The Sabres handed the Russians the first of only two defeats on the tour. The French Connection contributed four goals and five assists to a 12–6 victory. The night marked the worst defeat by a Russian hockey team in international competition.

== Accolades and records ==
Among the numerous accolades that the trio won, Rick Martin was the 1977 NHL All-Star Game most valuable player and Perreault scored the game-winning overtime goal in the 1978 NHL All-Star Game at the Buffalo Memorial Auditorium. Perreault was selected to play in nine All-Star games (1970–71, 1971–72, 1973–74, 1974–75, 1976–77, 1977–78, 1978–79, 1979–80, 1983–84), Martin was selected to play in seven consecutive All-Star games (1971–72 through 1977–78) and Robert was selected to two All-Star games (1972–73, 1974–75). In addition, Martin was selected as the official NHL All-Star first team left wing in 1973–74 & 1974–75 and the official NHL All-Star second team left wing in 1975–76 & 1976–77. Perreault was selected as the official NHL All-Star second team center in 1975–76 & 1976–77. Rene Robert was selected as the official NHL All-Star second team right wing in 1974–75. Perreault earned the Calder Memorial Trophy in 1971 and the Lady Byng Trophy in 1973. All honours for all players were as Buffalo Sabres. All official NHL All-Star team selections were earned while the three were teammates. Perreault was inducted into the Hockey Hall of Fame in 1990.

Perreault holds numerous club career records (including regular season games played, goals, assists, points, game-winning goals, 30-goal seasons, 20-goal seasons, and shots on goal). However, Martin holds the franchise career records for hat tricks, four-goal games, 40-goal seasons, consecutive 40-goal seasons, 50-goal seasons (tied with Danny Gare) and consecutive 50-goal seasons. Although Robert's name is not as prominent in the record books. his 40-goal and 60-assist 1974–75 NHL season was the club's first 100-point season by an individual. During the seven full seasons the trio was together, Perreault led the Sabres in scoring five times and Robert and Martin led the team once each. Martin led the team three times in goals, Perreault twice and Robert once during this time. Perreault led the team in assists four times and Robert did so twice. In addition, the two tied once for the lead in assists. Martin's 1975–76 season with 7 hat tricks continues to be tied with Alexander Mogilny for the franchise single-season record. Martin and Perreault continue to be first and second for rookie season points and goals in franchise history (records set before the arrival of Robert).

== Legacy ==
The trio was, and remains, immensely popular in Buffalo, New York, as well as the surrounding Western New York area, and their international popularity and cultural prominence was also evident.

The line made occasional appearances as members of the Buffalo Sabres Alumni Hockey Team until Martin's death in March 2011. Their last appearance together was to introduce Terrence Pegula as the Sabres' owner on February 24, 2011. A statue of "The French Connection," unveiled in 2012, is located outside the Sabres' arena, now known as KeyBank Center.

== The French Connection years ==
=== Regular season ===
The French Connection regular season records
| | René Robert | | | | | Rick Martin | | | | | Gilbert Perreault | | | | |
| Season | GP | G | A | Pts | PIM | GP | G | A | Pts | PIM | GP | G | A | Pts | PIM |
|---|---|---|---|---|---|---|---|---|---|---|---|---|---|---|---|
| 1972–73 | 75 | 40 | 43 | 83 | 83 | 75 | 37 | 36 | 73 | 79 | 78 | 28 | 60 | 88 | 10 |
| 1973–74 | 76 | 21 | 44 | 65 | 71 | 78 | 52 | 34 | 86 | 38 | 55 | 18 | 33 | 51 | 10 |
| 1974–75 | 74 | 40 | 60 | 100 | 75 | 68 | 52 | 43 | 95 | 72 | 68 | 39 | 57 | 96 | 36 |
| 1975–76 | 72 | 35 | 52 | 87 | 53 | 80 | 49 | 37 | 86 | 67 | 80 | 44 | 69 | 113 | 36 |
| 1976–77 | 80 | 33 | 40 | 73 | 46 | 66 | 36 | 29 | 65 | 58 | 80 | 39 | 56 | 95 | 30 |
| 1977–78 | 67 | 25 | 48 | 73 | 25 | 65 | 28 | 35 | 63 | 16 | 79 | 41 | 48 | 89 | 20 |
| 1978–79 | 68 | 22 | 40 | 62 | 46 | 73 | 32 | 21 | 53 | 35 | 79 | 27 | 58 | 85 | 20 |

=== Playoffs ===
The French Connection playoff records
| | Robert | | | | | Martin | | | | | Perreault | | | | |
| Season | GP | G | A | Pts | PIM | GP | G | A | Pts | PIM | GP | G | A | Pts | PIM |
|---|---|---|---|---|---|---|---|---|---|---|---|---|---|---|---|
| 1972–73 | 6 | 5 | 3 | 8 | 2 | 6 | 3 | 2 | 5 | 12 | 6 | 3 | 7 | 10 | 2 |
| 1973–74 | — | | | | | | | | | | | | | | |
| 1974–75 | 16 | 5 | 8 | 13 | 16 | 17 | 7 | 8 | 15 | 20 | 17 | 6 | 9 | 15 | 10 |
| 1975–76 | 9 | 3 | 2 | 5 | 6 | 9 | 4 | 7 | 11 | 12 | 9 | 4 | 4 | 8 | 4 |
| 1976–77 | 6 | 5 | 2 | 7 | 20 | 6 | 2 | 1 | 3 | 9 | 6 | 1 | 8 | 9 | 4 |
| 1977–78 | 7 | 2 | 0 | 2 | 23 | 7 | 2 | 4 | 6 | 13 | 8 | 3 | 2 | 5 | 0 |
| 1978–79 | 3 | 2 | 2 | 4 | 4 | 3 | 0 | 3 | 3 | 0 | 3 | 1 | 0 | 1 | 2 |

== See also ==
- List of ice hockey linemates
