= 1975 Stanley Cup Final =

1975 ice hockey championship series

	1	2	3	4	5	6	Total
Philadelphia Flyers	4	2	4*	2	5	2	4
Buffalo Sabres	1	1	5*	4	1	0	2
- * – Denotes overtime period(s)
- Location(s): Philadelphia: Spectrum (1, 2, 5); Buffalo: Memorial Auditorium (3, 4, 6)
- Coaches: Philadelphia: Fred Shero; Buffalo: Floyd Smith
- Captains: Philadelphia: Bobby Clarke; Buffalo: Jim Schoenfeld
- National anthems: Philadelphia: Kate Smith; Buffalo: Unknown
- Referees: Art Skov (1, 5); Bruce Hood (2, 6); Lloyd Gilmour (3); Wally Harris (4)
- Dates: May 15–27, 1975
- MVP: Bernie Parent (Flyers)
- Series-winning goal: Bob Kelly (0:11, third)
- Hall of Famers: Flyers: Bill Barber (1990); Bobby Clarke (1987); Bernie Parent (1984); Sabres: Gilbert Perreault (1990); Coaches: Fred Shero (2013); Officials: Neil Armstrong (1991); John D'Amico (1993); Matt Pavelich (1987)
- Networks: Canada: (English): CBC (French): SRC; United States: (National): NBC (2, 5) (Philadelphia area): WTAF (3–4, 6) (Buffalo area): WKBW (1, 3–4, 6)
- Announcers: (CBC) Danny Gallivan (1–2, 6) Jim Robson (3–5), Dick Irvin Jr. (1–2, 4, 6), and Bill Good (Games 3, 5) (SRC) Rene Lecavalier and Gilles Tremblay (NBC) Tim Ryan and Ted Lindsay (WTAF) Don Earle and Gene Hart (WKBW) Ted Darling and Pat Hannigan

The 1975 Stanley Cup Final was the championship series of the National Hockey League's (NHL) 1974–75 season, and the culmination of the 1975 Stanley Cup playoffs. It was contested between the Buffalo Sabres and the defending champion Philadelphia Flyers. The Flyers defeated the Sabres in six games to repeat as Stanley Cup champions, becoming the first expansion team to accomplish such a feat. This was the first Final to have two non-"Original Six" teams since the 1967 expansion, and also the first contested by any team that had joined the league after 1967 (the Sabres were part of the 1970 expansion). The 1975 Flyers are the last Stanley Cup championship team to be composed solely of Canadian players.

This was the only Final between 1965 and 1979 not to feature either the Boston Bruins or the Montreal Canadiens.

== Paths to the Finals ==
Buffalo defeated the Chicago Black Hawks 4–1 and the Montreal Canadiens 4–2 to advance to the final.

Philadelphia defeated the Toronto Maple Leafs 4–0 and the New York Islanders 4–3 to make it to the final.

== Game summaries ==
Bernie Parent was the outgunned Flyers' best player, allowing only 12 goals in the six games, capped with a shutout. He became the first player to win the Conn Smythe Trophy for two consecutive years. Since Parent, only two players have also won consecutive Conn Smythe Trophies: the Pittsburgh Penguins' Mario Lemieux in the Penguins' Stanley Cup wins in 1991 and 1992 and Sidney Crosby in the Penguins' 2016 and 2017 Stanley Cup championships. In the deciding game six played in Buffalo, the Sabres' offensive big guns rained shot after shot on Parent in an all-out effort to turn the series around, but Parent remained perfect. He stopped French Connection linemates Gilbert Perreault and Rick Martin on a 2–1 late in period two that had Flyers broadcaster Gene Hart screaming into his microphone:

Out come the Sabres...two on one...Perreault and Martin with just Dupont back...Perrault to Martin...He's in...Shot!....save by Parent...and he hangs on!...Oh baby!

The dramatic stop by Parent took the offensive energy out of the Sabres and the Flyers scored two third-period goals to take the championship.

== Fog and the bat ==
The third game of the series was the Fog Game. Due to unusual heat in Buffalo in May 1975, and the lack of an air conditioning system in the auditorium, portions of the game were played in heavy fog. During stoppages of play, rink employees skated around the arena ice carrying bed sheets in an attempt to dispel the fog. Players, officials, and the puck were invisible to many spectators. The fog began to form just minutes after another odd incident: A bat in the arena, which flew above and around the players for the majority of the game, until Sabres center Jim Lorentz killed it with his stick. Many superstitious Buffalo fans considered this to be an 'evil omen', pertaining to the result of the series. The game continued and the Sabres won thanks to Rene Robert's goal in overtime.

== Series box score ==
=== Game one ===
May 15	Buffalo Sabres	1–4	Philadelphia Flyers	The Spectrum	Recap

Scoring summary
Period	Team	Goal	Assist(s)	Time	Score
1st	None				
2nd	None				
3rd	PHI	Bill Barber (5)	Ed Van Impe (3) and Rick MacLeish (7)	03:42	1–0 PHI
3rd	PHI	Ross Lonsberry (3) – pp	Tom Bladon (3) and Bobby Clarke (10)	07:29	2–0 PHI
3rd	BUF	Rick Martin (6) – pp	Jim Lorentz (3)	11:07	2–1 PHI
3rd	PHI	Bobby Clarke (3) – pp	Unassisted	11:41	3–1 PHI
3rd	PHI	Bill Barber (6) – en	Bobby Clarke (11)	19:02	4–1 PHI
Penalty summary
Period	Team	Player	Penalty	Time	PIM
1st	PHI	Don Saleski	Elbowing	03:13	2:00
1st	BUF	Bill Hajt	Tripping	04:25	2:00
1st	BUF	Gilbert Perreault	Hooking	07:36	2:00
1st	PHI	Gary Dornhoefer	Cross-checking	11:39	2:00
1st	PHI	Andre Dupont	Cross-checking	12:35	2:00
1st	BUF	Brian Spencer	High-sticking	18:43	2:00
1st	PHI	Rick MacLeish	Hooking	18:43	2:00
2nd	PHI	Tom Bladon	Hooking	02:56	2:00
2nd	PHI	Gary Dornhoefer	Elbowing	05:38	2:00
2nd	BUF	Danny Gare	Roughing	09:47	2:00
2nd	PHI	Dave Schultz	Roughing	09:47	2:00
2nd	PHI	Dave Schultz	Slashing	09:47	2:00
3rd	BUF	Jim Schoenfeld	Holding	06:28	2:00
3rd	PHI	Tom Bladon	Interference	09:20	2:00
3rd	BUF	Jerry Korab	Slashing	11:36	2:00

Shots by period
Team	1	2	3	Total
Buffalo	8	14	6	28
Philadelphia	2	8	12	22

=== Game two ===
May 18	Buffalo Sabres	1–2	Philadelphia Flyers	The Spectrum	Recap

Scoring summary
Period	Team	Goal	Assist(s)	Time	Score
1st	None				
2nd	PHI	Reggie Leach (6)	Bobby Clarke (12) and Ross Lonsberry (3)	08:24	1–0 PHI
3rd	BUF	Jerry Korab (2)	Jim Lorentz (4) and Brian Spencer (4)	02:18	1–1
3rd	PHI	Bobby Clarke (4) – pp	Bill Barber (12) and Rick MacLeish (8)	06:43	2–1 PHI
Penalty summary
Period	Team	Player	Penalty	Time	PIM
1st	PHI	Bobby Clarke	Cross-checking	00:50	2:00
1st	BUF	Rick Martin	Holding	04:25	2:00
1st	PHI	Joe Watson	Tripping	11:26	2:00
1st	PHI	Tom Bladon	Cross-checking	13:56	2:00
1st	BUF	Larry Carriere	Charging	17:01	2:00
1st	BUF	Don Luce	Misconduct	19:05	10:00
1st	BUF	Jim Schoenfeld	Interference	19:05	2:00
2nd	PHI	Tom Bladon	Charging	03:53	2:00
2nd	BUF	Rene Robert	Tripping	11:01	2:00
2nd	BUF	Rick Martin	Roughing	17:05	2:00
2nd	PHI	Don Saleski	Roughing	17:05	2:00
3rd	BUF	Don Luce	Hooking	06:15	2:00

Shots by period
Team	1	2	3	Total
Buffalo	8	8	3	19
Philadelphia	12	5	7	24

=== Game three ===
May 20	Philadelphia Flyers	4–5	OT	Buffalo Sabres	Buffalo Memorial Auditorium	Recap

Scoring summary
Period	Team	Goal	Assist(s)	Time	Score
1st	PHI	Gary Dornhoefer (4)	Bill Barber (7)	00:39	1–0 PHI
1st	PHI	Don Saleski (2)	Ted Harris (3)	03:09	2–0 PHI
1st	BUF	Danny Gare (6)	Craig Ramsay (6) and Don Luce (6)	11:46	2–1 PHI
1st	BUF	Rick Martin (7)	Jocelyn Guevremont (6)	12:03	2–2
1st	PHI	Rick MacLeish (11)	Bill Barber (8)	14:13	3–2 PHI
2nd	BUF	Don Luce (4)	Jerry Korab (2)	00:29	3–3
2nd	PHI	Don Saleski (2)	Bob Kelly (2) and Terry Crisp (1)	14:30	4–3 PHI
3rd	BUF	Bill Hajt (1)	Rick Martin (5) and Don Luce (7)	09:56	4–4
OT	BUF	Rene Robert (5)	Gilbert Perreault (9) and Rick Martin (5)	18:26	5–4 BUF
Penalty summary
Period	Team	Player	Penalty	Time	PIM
1st	PHI	Bob Kelly	Slashing	08:07	2:00
1st	PHI	Andre Dupont	Charging	08:47	2:00
1st	BUF	Danny Gare	Roughing	15:03	2:00
1st	PHI	Dave Schultz	Roughing	15:03	2:00
2nd	PHI	Gary Dornhoefer	Slashing	05:15	2:00
2nd	BUF	Jim Schoenfeld	Interference	07:48	2:00
2nd	BUF	Jocelyn Guevremont	Tripping	11:57	2:00
3rd	PHI	Ed Van Impe	Tripping	01:59	2:00
3rd	BUF	Rick Dudley	Interference	08:19	2:00
3rd	PHI	Gary Dornhoefer	Roughing	08:19	2:00
OT	PHI	Andre Dupont	Hooking	04:18	2:00

Shots by period
Team	1	2	3	OT	Total
Philadelphia	6	14	7	6	33
Buffalo	18	9	12	7	46

=== Game four ===
May 22	Philadelphia Flyers	2–4	Buffalo Sabres	Buffalo Memorial Auditorium	Recap

Scoring summary
Period	Team	Goal	Assist(s)	Time	Score
1st	PHI	Andre Dupont (3)	Bob Kelly (7) and Terry Crisp (2)	11:28	1–0 PHI
2nd	BUF	Jerry Korab (3) – pp	Rene Robert (7) and Rick Martin (7)	03:46	1–1
2nd	PHI	Ross Lonsberry (4)	Rick MacLeish (9)	04:20	2–1 PHI
2nd	BUF	Gilbert Perreault (6) – pp	Rene Robert (8) and Rick Martin (8)	10:07	2–2
2nd	BUF	Jim Lorentz (6)	Rick Dudley (1) and Jim Schoenfeld (3)	15:07	3–2 BUF
3rd	BUF	Danny Gare (7) – en	Don Luce (7) and Jim Schoenfeld (4)	19:28	4–2 BUF
Penalty summary
Period	Team	Player	Penalty	Time	PIM
1st	PHI	Ed Van Impe	Interference	03:26	2:00
1st	BUF	Gilbert Perreault	Tripping	04:16	2:00
1st	PHI	Don Saleski	Holding	04:29	2:00
1st	BUF	Rene Robert	Hooking	18:05	2:00
2nd	PHI	Don Saleski	Interference	00:17	2:00
2nd	PHI	Andre Dupont	Charging	04:16	2:00
2nd	BUF	Rick Dudley	Roughing	03:22	2:00
2nd	PHI	Ed Van Impe	Hooking	03:22	2:00
2nd	BUF	Rick Dudley	Fighting – major	05:38	5:00
2nd	BUF	Jim Schoenfeld	Fighting – major	05:38	5:00
2nd	PHI	Bob Kelly	Fighting – major	05:38	5:00
2nd	PHI	Dave Schultz	Fighting – major	05:38	5:00
2nd	PHI	Ross Lonsberry	Cross-checking	09:15	2:00
2nd	BUF	Jocelyn Guevremont	Holding	12:14	2:00
2nd	BUF	Gilbert Perreault	Holding	18:42	2:00
3rd	None				

Shots by period
Team	1	2	3	Total
Philadelphia	7	11	7	25
Buffalo	8	14	5	27

=== Game five ===
May 25	Buffalo Sabres	1–5	Philadelphia Flyers	The Spectrum	Recap

Scoring summary
Period	Team	Goal	Assist(s)	Time	Score
1st	PHI	Dave Schultz (1)	Don Saleski (3) and Orest Kindrachuk (1)	03:12	1–0 PHI
1st	PHI	Gary Dornhoefer (5)	Terry Crisp (3) and Ed Van Impe (4)	12:31	2–0 PHI
1st	PHI	Bob Kelly (2)	Terry Crisp (4) and Jimmy Watson (7)	12:50	3–0 PHI
2nd	PHI	Reggie Leach (8) – pp	Bill Barber (9) and Larry Goodenough (3)	01:55	4–0 PHI
2nd	PHI	Dave Schultz (2)	Larry Goodenough (4) and Ted Harris (4)	09:56	5–0 PHI
3rd	BUF	Don Luce (5)	Craig Ramsay (7) and Danny Gare (6)	14:02	5–1 PHI
Penalty summary
Period	Team	Player	Penalty	Time	PIM
1st	PHI	Larry Goodenough	Elbowing	10:17	2:00
1st	PHI	Gary Dornhoefer	Holding	14:47	2:00
1st	BUF	Brian Spencer	Tripping	17:16	2:00
2nd	BUF	Jocelyn Guevremont	Hooking	00:40	2:00
2nd	PHI	Gary Dornhoefer	Interference	02:16	2:00
3rd	PHI	Gary Dornhoefer	Holding	14:58	2:00
3rd	BUF	Jim Lorentz	Holding	17:50	2:00

Shots by period
Team	1	2	3	Total
Buffalo	10	6	8	24
Philadelphia	9	7	10	26

=== Game six ===
May 27	Philadelphia Flyers	2–0	Buffalo Sabres	Buffalo Memorial Auditorium	Recap

Scoring summary
Period	Team	Goal	Assist(s)	Time	Score
1st	None				
2nd	None				
3rd	PHI	Bob Kelly (3)	Reggie Leach (2) and Jimmy Watson (8)	00:11	1–0 PHI
3rd	PHI	Bill Clement (1)	Orest Kindrachuk (2)	17:13	2–0 PHI
Penalty summary
Period	Team	Player	Penalty	Time	PIM
1st	BUF	Jerry Korab	Interference	02:29	2:00
1st	PHI	Bill Clement	Holding	08:53	2:00
1st	PHI	Andre Dupont	Holding	11:41	2:00
1st	PHI	Ed Van Impe	Interference	14:19	2:00
1st	BUF	Rene Robert	Holding	15:24	2:00
1st	PHI	Dave Schultz	Interference	19:21	2:00
2nd	BUF	Jerry Korab	Holding	05:19	2:00
2nd	PHI	Ted Harris	Cross-checking	07:39	2:00
2nd	BUF	Jocelyn Guevremont	Holding	13:53	2:00
3rd	BUF	Rick Martin	Tripping	01:11	2:00
3rd	BUF	Larry Carriere	Slashing	03:25	2:00
3rd	PHI	Orest Kindrachuk	Holding	10:32	2:00

Shots by period
Team	1	2	3	Total
Philadelphia	6	12	13	31
Buffalo	13	13	6	32

== Team rosters ==
=== Philadelphia Flyers ===
No.	Nat	Player	Pos	S/G	Age	Acquired	Birthplace
1	(Canada)	Bernie Parent	G	L	30	1973	Montreal, Quebec
2	(Canada)	Ed Van Impe	D	L	35	1967	Saskatoon, Saskatchewan
3	(Canada)	Tom Bladon	D	R	22	1972	Edmonton, Alberta
5	(Canada)	Larry Goodenough	D	R	22	1973	Toronto, Ontario
6	(Canada)	Andre Dupont	D	L	25	1972	Trois-Rivières, Quebec
7	(Canada)	Bill Barber	LW	L	22	1972	Callander, Ontario
8	(Canada)	Dave Schultz	LW	L	25	1969	Waldheim, Saskatchewan
9	(Canada)	Bob Kelly	LW	L	24	1970	Oakville, Ontario
10	(Canada)	Bill Clement	C	L	24	1970	Buckingham, Quebec
11	(Canada)	Don Saleski	RW	R	25	1972	Moose Jaw, Saskatchewan
12	(Canada)	Gary Dornhoefer (A)	RW	R	32	1967	Kitchener, Ontario
14	(Canada)	Joe Watson (A)	D	L	31	1967	Smithers, British Columbia
15	(Canada)	Terry Crisp (A)	C	L	31	1973	Parry Sound, Ontario
16	(Canada)	Bobby Clarke (C)	C	L	25	1969	Flin Flon, Manitoba
18	(Canada)	Ross Lonsberry	LW	L	28	1972	Watson, Saskatchewan
19	(Canada)	Rick MacLeish	C	L	25	1971	Cannington, Ontario
20	(Canada)	Jim Watson	D	L	22	1972	Smithers, British Columbia
25	(Canada)	Ted Harris	D	L	38	1974	Winnipeg, Manitoba
26	(Canada)	Orest Kindrachuk	C	L	24	1972	Nanton, Alberta
27	(Canada)	Reggie Leach	RW	R	25	1974	Riverton, Manitoba
30	(Canada)	Bobby Taylor	G	R	30	1968	Calgary, Alberta
35	(Canada)	Wayne Stephenson	G	L	30	1974	Fort William, Ontario

=== Buffalo Sabres ===
No.	Nat	Player	Pos	S/G	Age	Acquired	Birthplace
1	(Canada)	Roger Crozier	G	R	33	1970	Bracebridge, Ontario
3	(Canada)	Paul McIntosh	D	R	21	1974	Listowel, Ontario
4	(Canada)	Jerry Korab	D	L	26	1973	Sault Ste. Marie, Ontario
5	(United States)	Lee Fogolin Jr.	D	R	20	1974	Chicago, Illinois
6	(Canada)	Jim Schoenfeld (C)	D	L	22	1972	Galt, Ontario
7	(Canada)	Rick Martin	W	L	23	1971	LaSalle, Quebec
8	(Canada)	Jim Lorentz	C	L	28	1972	Waterloo, Ontario
9	(Canada)	Rick Dudley	LW	L	26	1972	Toronto, Ontario
10	(Canada)	Craig Ramsay	LW	L	24	1971	Weston, Ontario
11	(Canada)	Gilbert Perreault	C	L	24	1970	Victoriaville, Quebec
14	(Canada)	Rene Robert	RW	R	26	1972	Trois Rivieres, Quebec
15	(Canada)	Michel Deziel	LW	L	21	1974	Sorel, Quebec
16	(Canada)	Peter McNab	C	L	23	1972	Vancouver, British Columbia
17	(Canada)	Fred Stanfield	LW	L	31	1975	Toronto, Ontario
18	(Canada)	Danny Gare	RW	R	21	1974	Nelson, British Columbia
20	(Canada)	Don Luce	C	L	26	1971	London, Ontario
21	(Canada)	Brian Spencer	LW	L	25	1974	Fort St. James, British Columbia
22	(Canada)	Jocelyn Guevremont	D	R	24	1974	Montreal, Quebec
23	(Canada)	Larry Carriere	D	L	23	1972	Montreal, Quebec
24	(Canada)	Bill Hajt	D	L	23	1971	Radisson, Saskatchewan
29	(Canada)	Gary Bromley	G	L	25	1971	Edmonton, Alberta
30	(Canada)	Gerry Desjardins	G	L	30	1975	Sudbury, Ontario

== Stanley Cup engraving ==
The 1975 Stanley Cup was presented to Flyers captain Bobby Clarke by NHL President Clarence Campbell following the Flyers 2–0 win over the Sabres in game six.

The following Flyers players and staff had their names engraved on the Stanley Cup

1974–75 Philadelphia Flyers

=== Players ===
Centers

Wingers

- 7 Bill Barber
- 8 Dave Schultz
- 9 Bob Kelly
- 11 Don Saleski
- 12 Gary Dornhoefer (A)
- 18 Ross Lonsberry
- 27 Reggie Leach

Defencemen

- 2 Ed Van Impe
- 3 Tom Bladon
- 5 Larry Goodenough
- 6 Andre Dupont
- 14 Joe Watson (A)
- 20 Jimmy Watson
- 25 Edward Ted Harris

Goaltenders

- 1 Bernie Parent
- 30 Bobby Taylor
- 35 Wayne Stephenson

=== Coaching and administrative staff ===
- Ed Snider (Chairman/Owner), Joe Scott (President)
- F. Eugene Dixon Jr. (Vice Chairman), Fred Shero (Head Coach)
- Keith Allen (Vice President/General Manager)
- Lou Scheinfield (Vice President), Mike Nykoluk (Asst. Coach),
- Marcel Pelletier (Director of Player Development), Barry Ashbee (Asst. Coach)
- Frank Lewis (Trainer), Jim McKenzie (Asst. Trainer)

=== Stanley Cup engraving ===
- Edward "Ted" Harris won 5 Stanley Cups. He was engraved on the Stanley Cup with the Montreal Canadiens as Edward Harris in 1965, 1966, 1968, 1969. Harris was engraved as Ted Harris with the Philadelphia Flyers in 1975.
- Joe Kadlec and John Brogan (Directors of Public Relations) were included on Philadelphia's Stanley Cup-winning pictures in 1974, 1975, but their names do not appear on the Stanley Cup.
- Bobby Taylor only played 3 regular-season games after coming out of retirement. His name was engraved on the Stanley Cup because he was dressed for games 1 & 2 in the Stanley Cup Semi-Finals.

== See also ==
- 1974–75 NHL season
- Video of the game-winning goal for game 3. The fog is clearly visible at 1:19.

Preceded by Philadelphia Flyers; 1974	Philadelphia Flyers; Stanley Cup champions 1975	Succeeded by Montreal Canadiens; 1976
