= Buffalo Memorial Auditorium =

Former multipurpose arena in Buffalo, New York

- "The Aud"

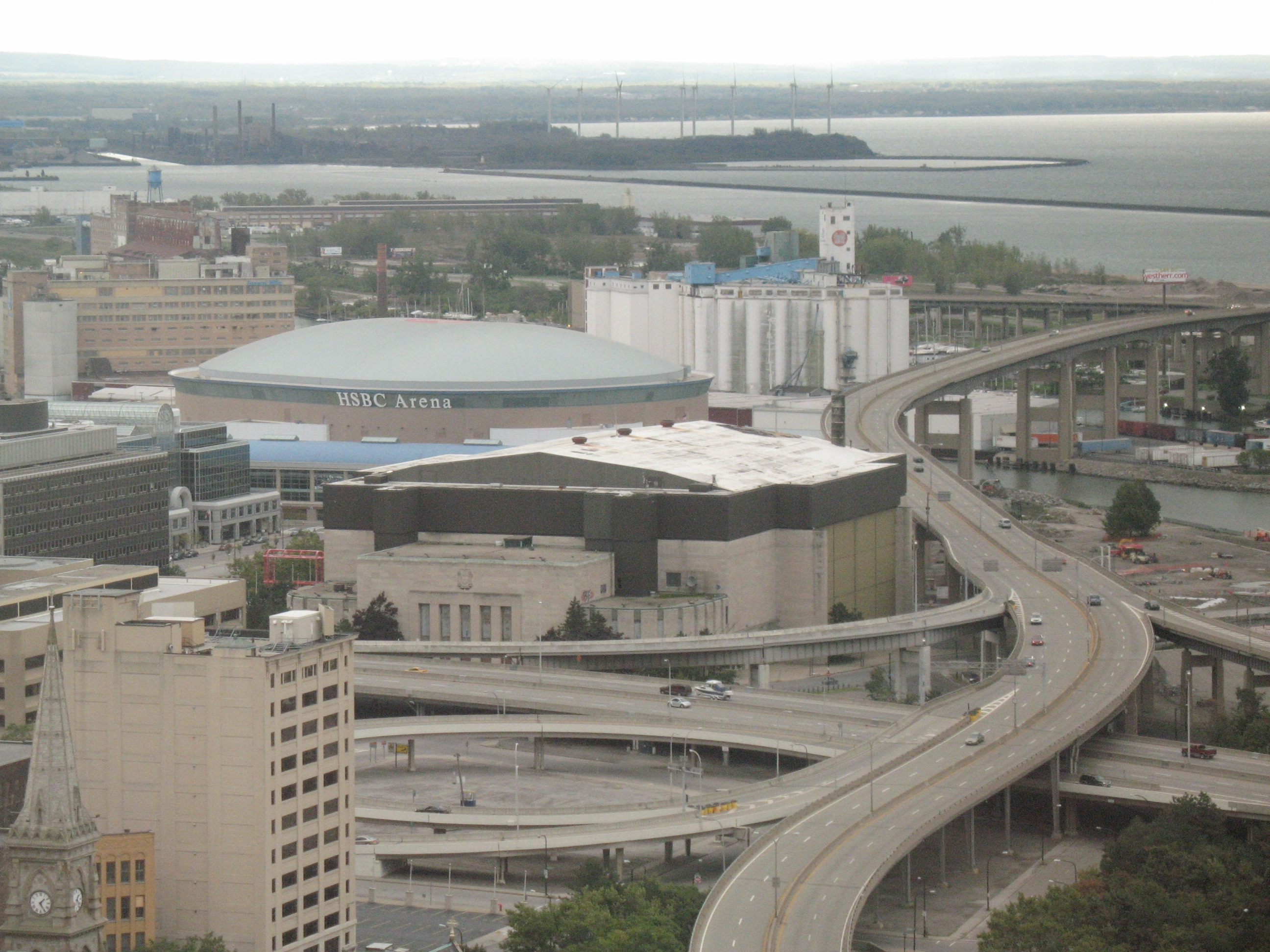
- Aerial view of the venue (center) in October 2007, two years before demolition.
- Interactive map of Buffalo Memorial Auditorium
- Address: 140 Main Street
- Location: Buffalo, New York
- Coordinates: 42.8780°N 78.8775°W
- Owner: City of Buffalo (1940–2007); Erie Canal Harbor Development Corporation (2007–2009)
- Operator: City of Buffalo
- Capacity: Basketball: 17,000 (1970–75), 18,000 (1975–96); Ice hockey: 12,280 (1939–70), 15,858 (1970–74), 15,863 (1974–75), 16,433 (1975–90), 16,325 (1990–93), 16,284 (1993–95), 16,230 (1995–96)
- Executive suites: 16
- Record attendance: Overall: 21,000; Ike Eisenhower rally, 10/23/1952; John F. Kennedy rally, 9/28/1960; Sports: 19,226; Braves vs. Celtics, 1/31/1976
- Field size: 350,000 sq ft (33,000 m^{2})
- Public transit: Auditorium (now Canalside)

Construction
- Groundbreaking: November 30, 1939
- Opened: October 14, 1940
- Renovated: 1970, 1990
- Expanded: 1970
- Closed: September 11, 1996
- Demolished: April 2009
- Cost: US$2.7 million ($62 million in 2025 dollars)
- Architect: Green & James

Tenants
- Canisius Golden Griffins (NCAA) 1940–1995; Buffalo Bisons (AHL) 1940–1970; Buffalo Bisons (NBL) 1946; Buffalo Braves (NBA) 1970–1978; Buffalo Sabres (NHL) 1970–1996; Toronto-Buffalo Royals (WTT) 1974; Buffalo Stallions (MISL) 1979–1984; Buffalo Bandits (MILL) 1992–1996; Buffalo Blizzard (NPSL) 1992–1996; Buffalo Stampede (RHI) 1994–1995

Buffalo Memorial Auditorium, colloquially known as The Aud, was a multipurpose indoor arena in downtown Buffalo, New York. Opened on October 14, 1940, it was home to the Canisius Golden Griffins (NCAA), the Buffalo Bisons (AHL), the Buffalo Bisons (NBL), the Buffalo Braves (NBA), the Buffalo Sabres (NHL), the Toronto-Buffalo Royals (WTT), the Buffalo Stallions (MISL), the Buffalo Bandits (MILL), the Buffalo Blizzard (NPSL) and the Buffalo Stampede (RHI). It also hosted events such as college basketball, concerts, professional wrestling and boxing. The venue was closed in 1996 after the construction of the venue now known as KeyBank Center, and remained vacant until being demolished in 2009.

== History ==
=== Planning and construction ===
The Buffalo Memorial Auditorium was a public works project designed by Green & James to replace the aging Broadway Auditorium and Fort Erie's recently collapsed Peace Bridge Arena. In June 1938, city officials sent a loan and grant application to the Public Works Administration for funds to build the structure. The approval of the $1.2 million grant was announced in Washington, D.C., on October 7, 1938. Construction at the junction of the Erie Canal and Main-Hamburg Canal began on November 30, 1939.

The Auditorium's construction brought a great deal of activity to downtown Buffalo. On December 31, 1939, Buffalo Evening News reporter Nat Gorham wrote:

As if overnight the Terrace once more is coming back to life. The massive new hall will be the mainstay, but city planners also want to improve the section with a boulevard in the old canal bend, waterfront parks and relocation, if not removal, of the New York Central tracks. Visible proof of these good intentions is construction of the new hall, which is being watched daily by hundreds of citizens.

— Nat Gorham

=== Opening and reception ===
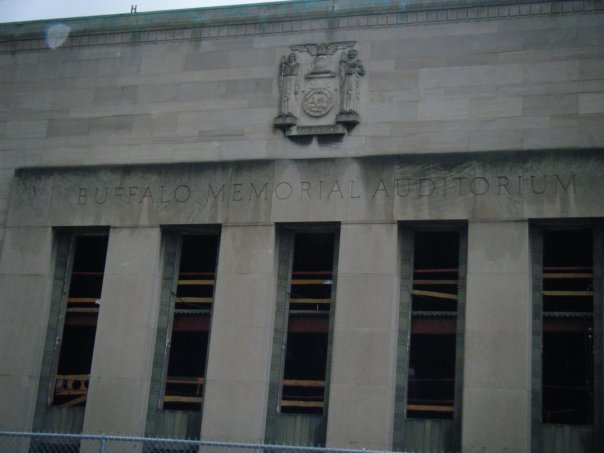
Entrance of the venue

Built for $2.7 million, Memorial Auditorium's grand opening celebration took place on October 14, 1940. The dedication event was a luncheon attended by 3,000 people, including the mayors of more than 60 local communities. The building was dedicated as a war memorial to those who had perished in World War I. The arena originally seated 12,280 for ice hockey, with an additional 2,000-3,000 seats in the floor area for basketball and other events. Memorial Auditorium's first event—a rally for Republican presidential candidate Wendell Willkie—took place on October 14, 1940. In its first seven months, events such as auto shows, roller skating, circuses and dog shows drew nearly one million spectators. All told, the Auditorium's first year attendance was 1.3 million.

=== Alterations ===
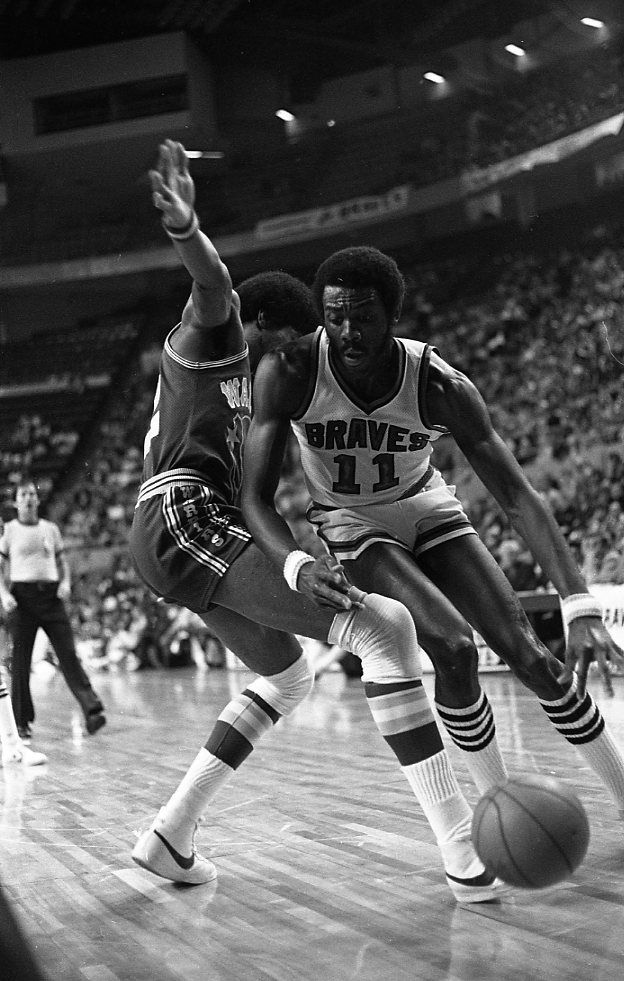
Bob McAdoo of the Buffalo Braves

An $8.7 million renovation took place after the 1970–71 inauguration of the Sabres and Braves franchises, making it a more suitable home for the NHL and NBA. The arena's roof was raised 24 feet (7.3 m) to make room for an upper level that increased the arena's capacity from 10,449 for hockey to over 17,000 for basketball and 15,360 for hockey in 1971–72, to 15,668 for hockey in 1972–73, and to 15,858 for hockey in 1973–74.

Other changes to the Aud's original design included:

- A new scoreboard, which would be the Aud's final scoreboard upgrade.
- A new upper level with stairways, escalators and upper exits.
- Repainted and replaced seats. The original gray seats at the top of the lower bowl were painted blue, and all seats in the lower sections were replaced with cushioned seats in the Red and Gold sections.
- The removal of exit tunnels in Red sections 6, 7, 14, 15, 22, 23, 30 and 31, and Blue sections 2, 3, 10, 11, 18, 19, 26, 27, 34 and 35. The areas the tunnels occupied were replaced with seats, and the continuous wall that separated the red and blue sections was opened at each stairway.
- The removed exit tunnel openings in the wall that separated the red and upper gold sections were closed into a continuous wall between the remaining red exit tunnels.

The Aud's seats were mostly made of white ash, but the gold seats were converted to padded cushion seats. From top to bottom (floor level), the seating colors went orange, blue (originally grey), red and gold.

In 1974, the city added five seats, increasing capacity for hockey in the 1974–1975 season to 15,863. After the hockey season, the city removed the walls and aisle that separated the upper gold and red seating sections. The 570 gold seats the city installed in the vacant space raised the arena's capacity to 16,433 for hockey and over 18,000 for basketball.

In the late 1980s, the Buffalo Common Council and mayor James D. Griffin scaled back plans to renovate the Aud after the Sabres' owners made it clear the franchise's long-term viability depended upon a new arena. A compromise led the city to agree to build a new venue (Marine Midland Arena) and keep the Aud functional until the new arena was complete. The 1990 renovation added designated handicap-accessible seating areas (lowering the seating capacity to 16,325 for hockey), new air conditioning and elevators. The money the city borrowed for these improvements was not repaid until 2001, five years after the Aud closed.

=== Closing and vacancy ===
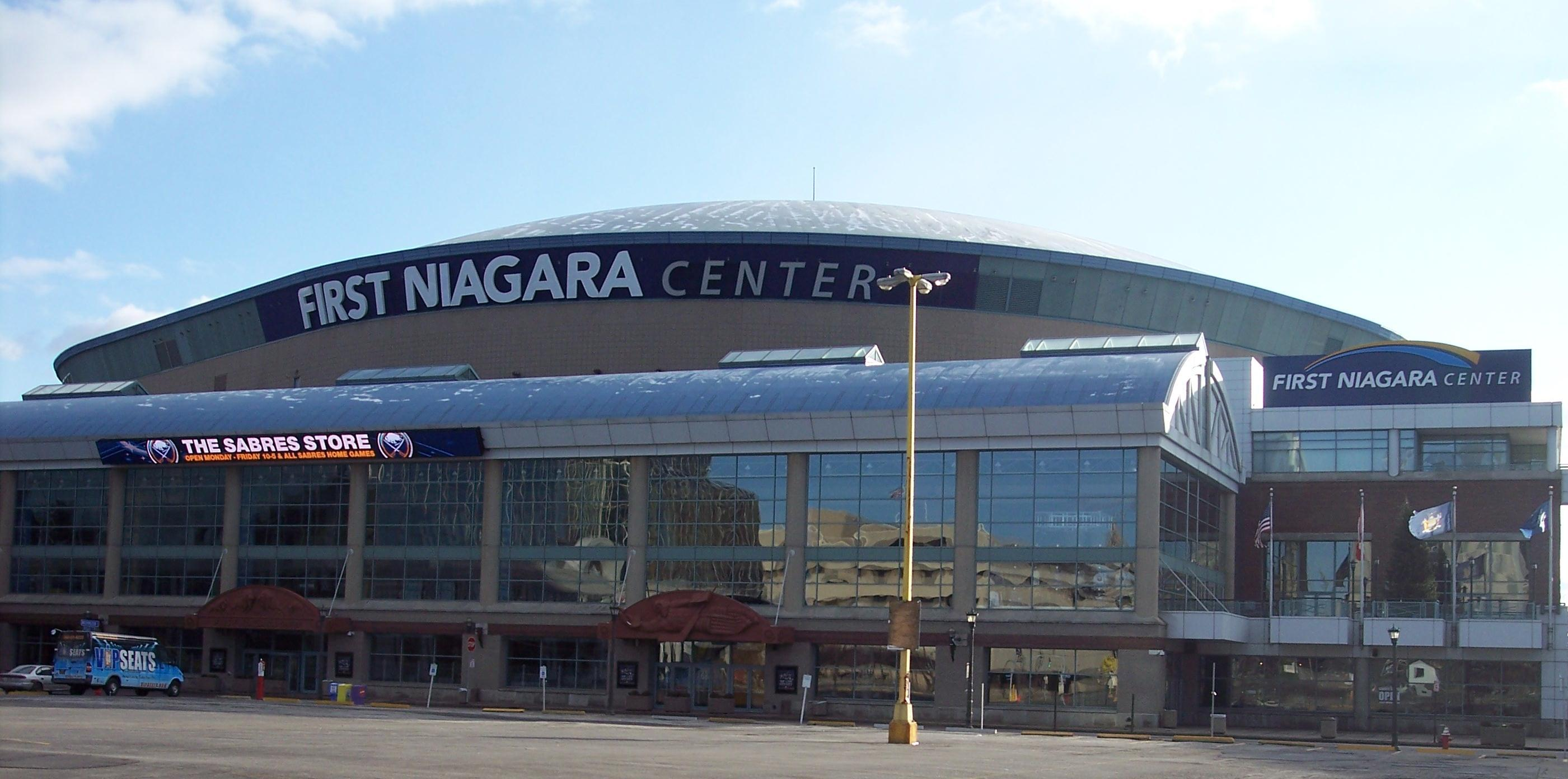
KeyBank Center

The Aud closed in 1996, at which time the Sabres, Bandits and Blizzard moved to Marine Midland Arena. After 1996, the building remained vacant, although members of Studio Arena Theatre used the floor as a surface for painting backgrounds. During the 2001–02 season, Sabres officials and the city moved items from the Aud's main concourse to the new venue, by then renamed HSBC Arena, including a sign for the "Pour Man's Aud Club" which was reincarnated at the new venue.

In 2003, the Sabres filmed a 30-minute infomercial inside the Aud to promote season ticket sales. While the production showed the arena was intact, it was without utilities and the crew had to supply all light and electrical sources.

The Aud continued to deteriorate after the 2003 production visit. Water pipes ruptured, moisture began to take its toll and the city's lax monitoring led to graffiti, vandalism and theft of many artifacts. A segment aired during the CBC Television Hockey Night in Canada broadcast of the 2008 NHL Winter Classic showed the arena's seating bowl and floor were virtually untouched. Notably, the advertisements on the boards from the final Sabres game in 1996 against the Hartford Whalers and the scoreboard above center ice remained. The door to the Sabres' penalty box was gone, as it had been presented as a memento to notable Sabres enforcer Rob Ray.

=== Demolition ===
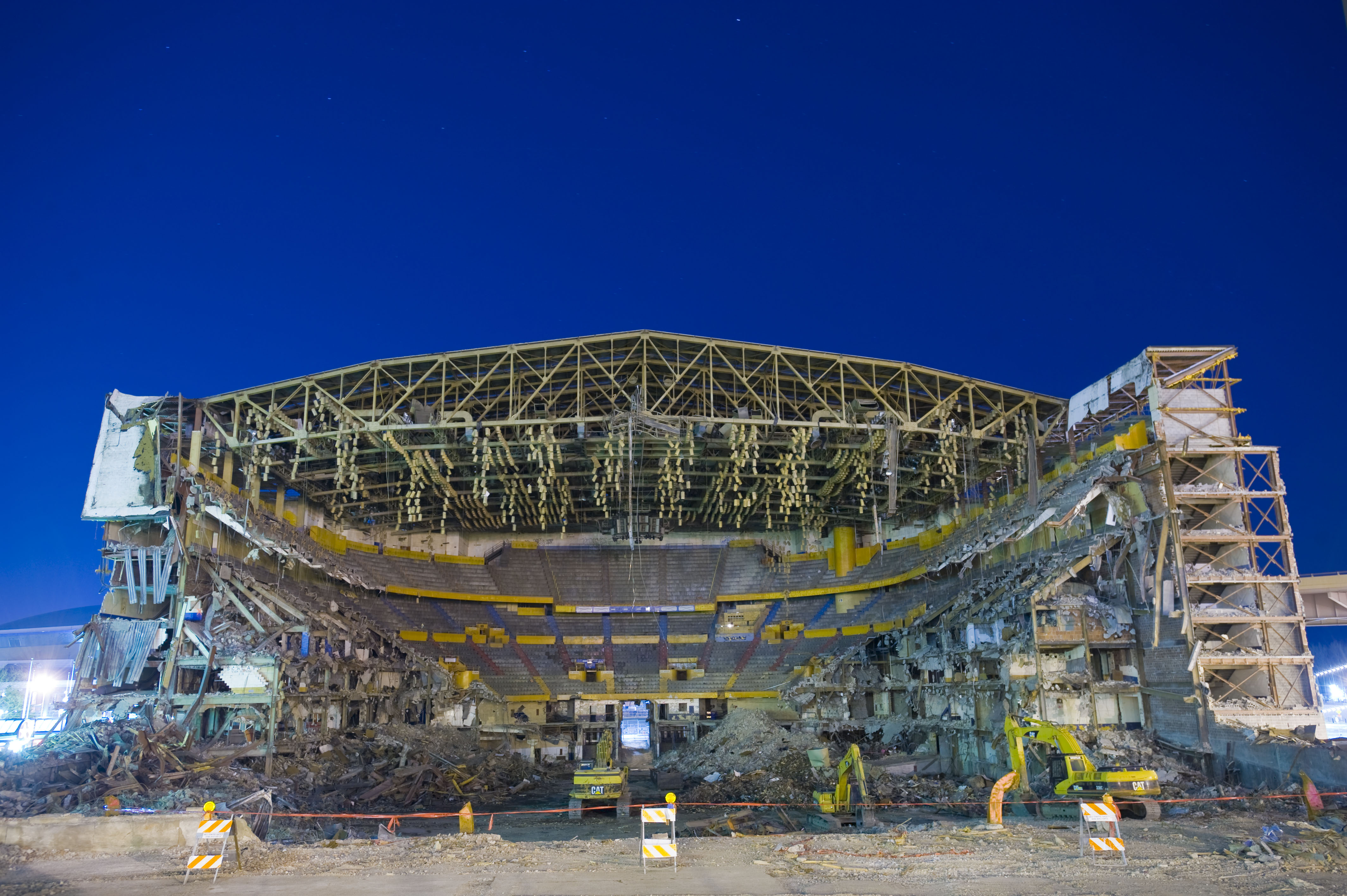
The venue being demolished in April 2009

The city abandoned its plans to repurpose the Aud as a Bass Pro Shops store on March 29, 2007, when Bass Pro announced it would construct a new building on the site after the auditorium's demolition.

In December 2007, the city sold the Aud to the Erie Canal Harbor Development Corporation for $1 in hopes it would lead to asbestos removal and demolition. All salvageable items were to be removed and sold or stored. The sales of these artifacts, especially of seats, would help pay for a memorial to the Aud. The salvaged items include art deco flag holders, limestone eagles, a time capsule as well as a number of blue and orange level seats, which were sold at auction.

The city also salvaged ten cylindrical stainless steel "ice tanks" that helped maintain chilly conditions at ice level during hockey season and cooled spectators during warmer weather. In 2007, the city moved them to Shea's Performing Arts Center as part of a $1.5 million overhaul of the landmark theater's heating and cooling system.

Asbestos removal and other environmental remediation took place in late 2008 and the expected $10 million demolition of the Aud began in January 2009. On February 9, 2009, the "Buffalo Memorial Auditorium" entablature above the main entrance fell and much of the front façade met the same fate soon afterward. The "Farewell Buffalo Memorial Auditorium Ceremony" took place on June 30, 2009, at 1:30 pm when officials opened the copper box time capsule. The structure's final pieces came down in early July 2009.

In February 2010, Bass Pro Shops announced that it was no longer pursuing a store in Buffalo, leaving the site vacant.

=== Legacy ===
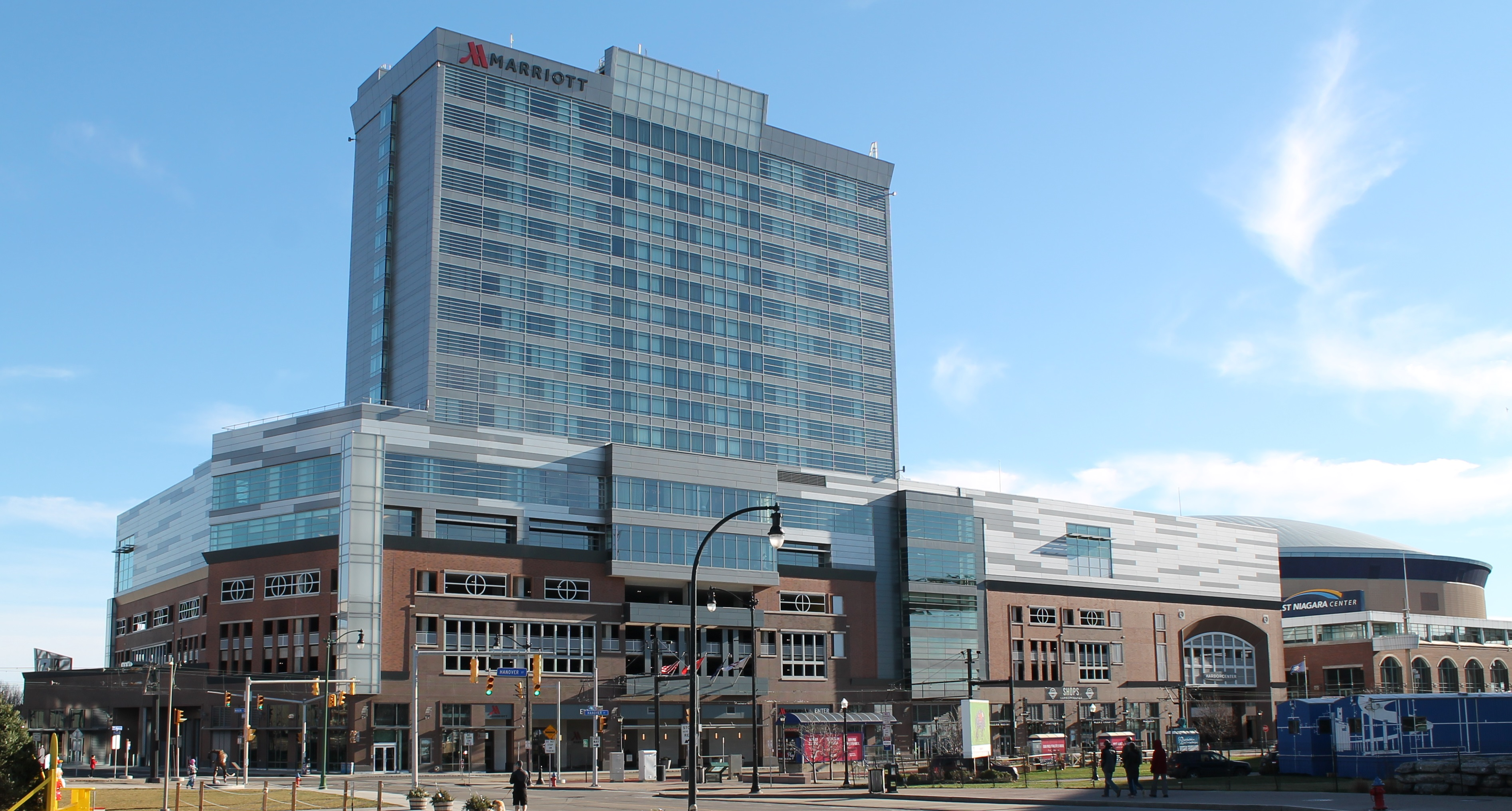
LECOM Harborcenter

After the Bass Pro Shops decision, the Erie Canal Harbor Development Corporation began to convert the site (known as the Aud Block) into an extension of Canalside with the junction of the old Erie Canal and Main-Hamburg Canal re-dug (although shallower than the original canals) and new bridges. The canals that opened in 2014 are frozen for skating and other winter activities by an underground refrigerant plant housed in a rebuilt sub-basement that was part of Memorial Auditorium. In addition, a marker on the canal ice denotes center ice's former location.

Across Main Street at LECOM Harborcenter is the one-of-a-kind Tim Hortons restaurant with a memorial to the Auditorium. A statue of the chain's founder and namesake, who played at the arena during his time with the Buffalo Sabres, occupies the corner of the site facing the restaurant.

== Notable events ==
=== Basketball ===
==== College ====
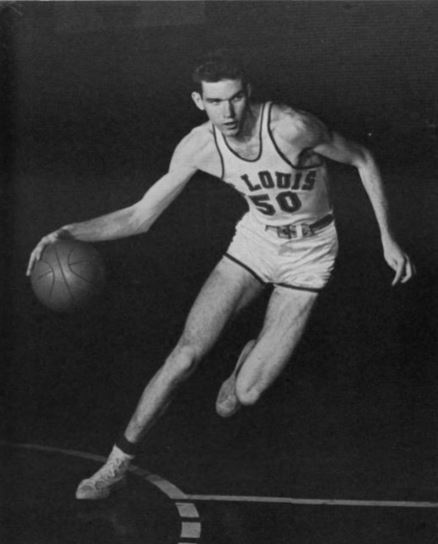
Ed Macauley of Saint Louis University

Before the National Basketball Association and National Hockey League came to Buffalo, college basketball was Memorial Auditorium's most popular sporting event. On December 11, 1940, the Auditorium hosted its first college basketball game when Canisius College played the University of Oregon. Interest in college basketball grew after World War II, and the first college basketball sellout crowd occurred in the 1946–1947 season when 11,029 spectators saw Canisius lose to Notre Dame. Ten days later, a record 11,891 watched Canisius defeat Niagara 52–44.

While the teams were typically from Western New York, including Canisius, Niagara University, St. Bonaventure University, the University at Buffalo and Buffalo State College, other teams such as Cornell University took part. Over time, the rivalry among the "Little Three" colleges—Niagara, Canisius, and St. Bonaventure—came to dominate the Auditorium's college basketball schedule. Throughout the 1950s, the three schools were all national powers, and their games at Memorial Auditorium drew strong local and national interest.

- The Aud hosted first-round games of the 1954 NCAA basketball tournament.
- The Auditorium hosted the men's Division I ECAC Upstate Region tournament organized by the Eastern College Athletic Conference (ECAC) in 1975.
- In 1991, a visit from Buffalo native Christian Laettner and the national champion Duke University Blue Devils against Canisius drew an Aud collegiate-record crowd of 16,279.
- A 1996 Buffalo News article named Memorial Auditorium's all-time all-visitors team: Ed Macauley (Saint Louis University), Tom Gola (La Salle University), Tom Heinsohn (College of the Holy Cross), Jerry West (West Virginia University), Willie Somerset (Duquesne University), Dave Bing (Syracuse University), Sonny Dove (St. John's University) and Bob Lanier (St. Bonaventure University).

==== National Basketball League ====
The National Basketball League's Buffalo Bisons were the first professional basketball franchise to call Memorial Auditorium home. The team featured center Don Otten and coach Nat Hickey, but on December 27, 1946—only 13 games into their inaugural season—owner Ben Kerner moved them to Moline, Illinois. After the 1949 merger of the National Basketball League and the Basketball Association of America and stops in Milwaukee and St. Louis, the team became the Atlanta Hawks.

==== National Basketball Association ====
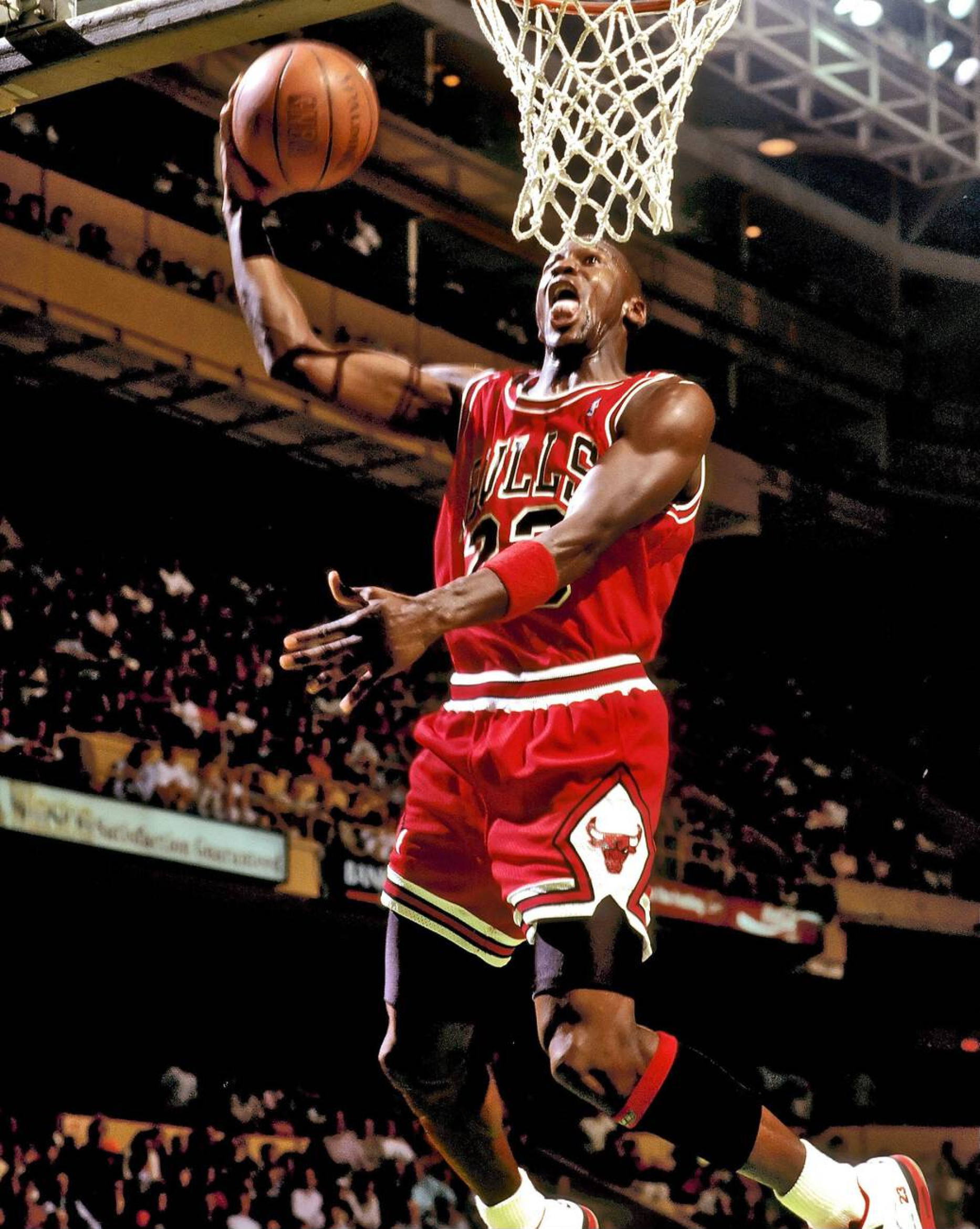
Michael Jordan of the Chicago Bulls

Professional basketball returned to the Aud in 1970 with the National Basketball Association's Buffalo Braves. The Braves were a modest success but often found the competing interests of the Sabres and the Little Three college teams made it difficult to schedule home games. The Braves moved to San Diego in 1978 and then to Los Angeles in 1984, where they are now the Los Angeles Clippers.

The NBA retained a presence at the venue by staging an annual series of preseason exhibitions called the NBA Classic:

- The Los Angeles Lakers defeated the New Jersey Nets 105–93 on October 24, 1988
- The New York Knicks defeated the Cleveland Cavaliers 96–93 on October 14, 1989
- The Chicago Bulls defeated the Miami Heat 115–107 on October 26, 1989
- The Boston Celtics defeated Washington Bullets 104–96 on October 26, 1990
- The Chicago Bulls defeated the Sacramento Kings 105–96 on October 27, 1992
- The New York Knicks defeated the Denver Nuggets 100–98 on October 17, 1995

==== World University Games ====
The basketball events of the World University Games were held at the venue in July 1993. The United States defeated Canada in the gold medal game 95–90 before a crowd of 11,000.

=== Hockey ===
==== American Hockey League ====
The American Hockey League's Buffalo Bisons played 30 seasons at the Memorial Auditorium, beginning with the 1940–41 season. After winning their first Calder Cup in 1943, the Bisons hired John Ducey to handle public relations, and manage the Memorial Auditorium. The Bisons won five Calder Cup championships, with the last coming in 1970 during the franchise's final game. The team folded in 1970 after the National Hockey League awarded Buffalo an expansion team.

On May 15, 1973, the Cincinnati Swords, then the Sabres' AHL affiliate, played the final game of the 1973 Calder Cup Finals at the Auditorium. The Swords won the Calder Cup with a 5–1 win over the Nova Scotia Voyageurs in front of 15,019 fans—the largest playoff crowd in AHL history at the time. The Rochester Americans also played several games at the Aud after they became the Sabres' affiliate, including several during their 1987 Calder Cup championship season.

==== National Hockey League ====
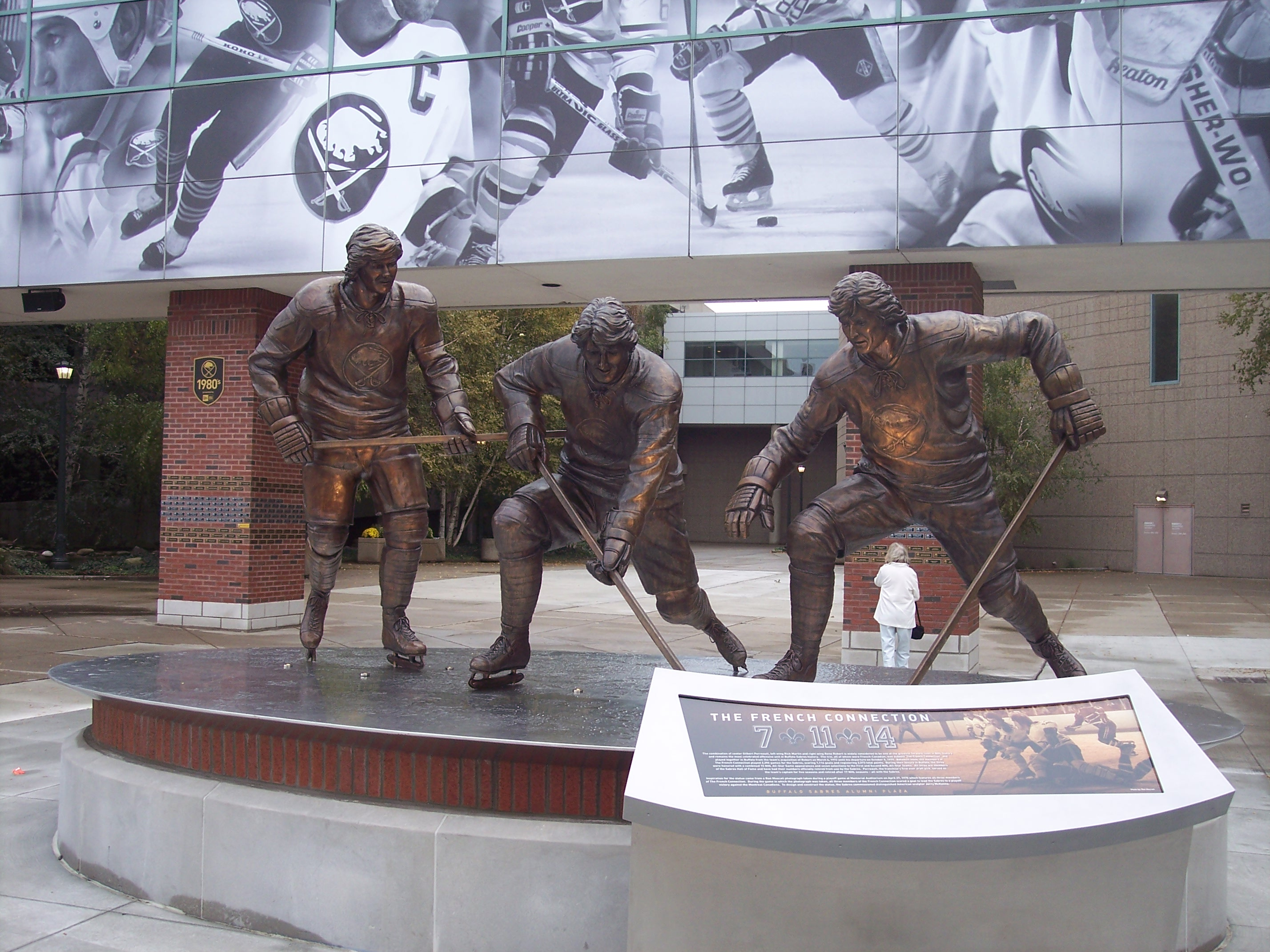
The French Connection of the Buffalo Sabres

The Buffalo Sabres made their Memorial Auditorium debut on October 15, 1970, in a game attended by NHL President Clarence Campbell that began with a ceremonial faceoff between Sabres captain Floyd Smith and Montreal Canadiens captain Jean Béliveau. The Sabres' Roger Crozier made 53 saves in a 3–0 loss.

The arena hosted games three, four, and six of the 1975 Stanley Cup Finals, where the Sabres faced the Philadelphia Flyers. Eventually, the Flyers would win their second consecutive Stanley Cup championship in game six at the arena. This was the only Stanley Cup Finals appearance made at the Auditorium.

On January 4, 1976, the Sabres played Krylya Sovetov as part of the "Super Series" of exhibitions between the Soviet Union's two best club teams—CSKA Moscow and Krylia Sovietov (named "Red Army" and "Soviet Wings" respectively, during the series) and eight of the NHL's top teams. The Sabres' 12–6 victory over the 1974 Soviet league and European Cup champions was the worst defeat ever for a professional Soviet hockey club.

The thing about that building was that everyone was so close that you could recognize people just by looking up. You don't get that in a lot of places today. The people felt like they were a part of the team and we felt like they were a part of our success. That was the special thing about Memorial Auditorium. I don't think anything like that can ever be replaced.

— Lindy Ruff

Memorial Auditorium hosted the NHL All-Star Game on January 24, 1978. Two members of the Sabres' "French Connection" line—Gilbert Perreault and Rick Martin—played for the Wales Conference. Both had a significant impact: Martin scored a goal with 1:39 remaining in regulation to tie the game at 2–2 and force overtime, and Perreault scored the game-winning goal 3:55 into overtime to defeat the Campbell Conference 3–2.

The Edmonton Oilers' Wayne Gretzky made NHL history at the Aud on February 24, 1982, when he scored a natural hat trick during the game's final seven minutes to help defeat the Sabres 6–3. Gretzky broke Phil Esposito's record for goals in a season (76) with the hat trick's first goal, his 77th of the season. In March 2009, Gretzky visited Buffalo as the Phoenix Coyotes' head coach and recounted his memories of Memorial Auditorium in an interview with Buffalo News hockey reporter Mike Harrington:

As much as the 77th goal was exciting for me as a NHL player, I think the biggest thrill was watching Gilbert Perreault play. I'd come down to the Aud with my dad or a friend and watch the Sabres play with the French Connection line ... There was a great atmosphere in this building, it was always a hockey atmosphere, and it was always fun to watch the Sabres play.

— Wayne Gretzky

During a game at the Memorial Auditorium between the visiting St. Louis Blues and Clint Malarchuk's Buffalo Sabres on March 22, 1989, Steve Tuttle of the Blues and Uwe Krupp of the Sabres crashed hard into the goal crease during play. As they collided, Tuttle's skate blade hit the right front side of Malarchuk's neck, severing his carotid artery and partially cutting his jugular vein.[2]

The venue hosted the 1991 NHL entry draft, notable for Eric Lindros being selected first overall by the Quebec Nordiques and refusing to sign with the team.

The Sabres occupied the Auditorium through the 1995–96 season, when they moved to nearby Marine Midland Arena, now known as KeyBank Center. Michael Peca scored the last in-game goal at the Aud while Pat LaFontaine put in a ceremonial goal after the 4–1 win over the Hartford Whalers. It was the last arena where the ice sheet fell short of the league-mandated 200 feet (61 m) by 85 feet (26 m) size (though Maple Leaf Gardens had irregularly shaped corners).

==== College ====
College hockey made its modern debut at Memorial Auditorium on January 23, 1972, when the University at Buffalo Bulls met the Central Collegiate Hockey Association's Ohio State University. Ohio State won the game 5–2.

==== Roller Hockey International ====
Roller Hockey International's Buffalo Stampede called the Aud home from 1994 to 1995, winning the league championship in their first season.

=== Lacrosse ===
==== Major Indoor Lacrosse League ====
The Buffalo Bandits of Major Indoor Lacrosse League played in the Aud from the 1992 season until the arena's closure. Winners of the MILL title in 1992, 1993, and 1996, the Bandits are now a member of the National Lacrosse League and play at KeyBank Center.

=== Soccer ===
==== Major Soccer League ====
Major Soccer League's Buffalo Stallions attracted 11,028 to their home debut at the Aud against the Philadelphia Fever on December 7, 1979. The team played in the venue until 1984. Soccer legend Eusébio notably finished his career playing for the Stallions in their inaugural season.

==== National Professional Soccer League ====
The Aud was home to the Buffalo Blizzard of the National Professional Soccer League from 1992 to 1996.

=== Tennis ===
In 1974, the Toronto-Buffalo Royals of World Team Tennis called the Aud home for one season.

=== Figure skating ===
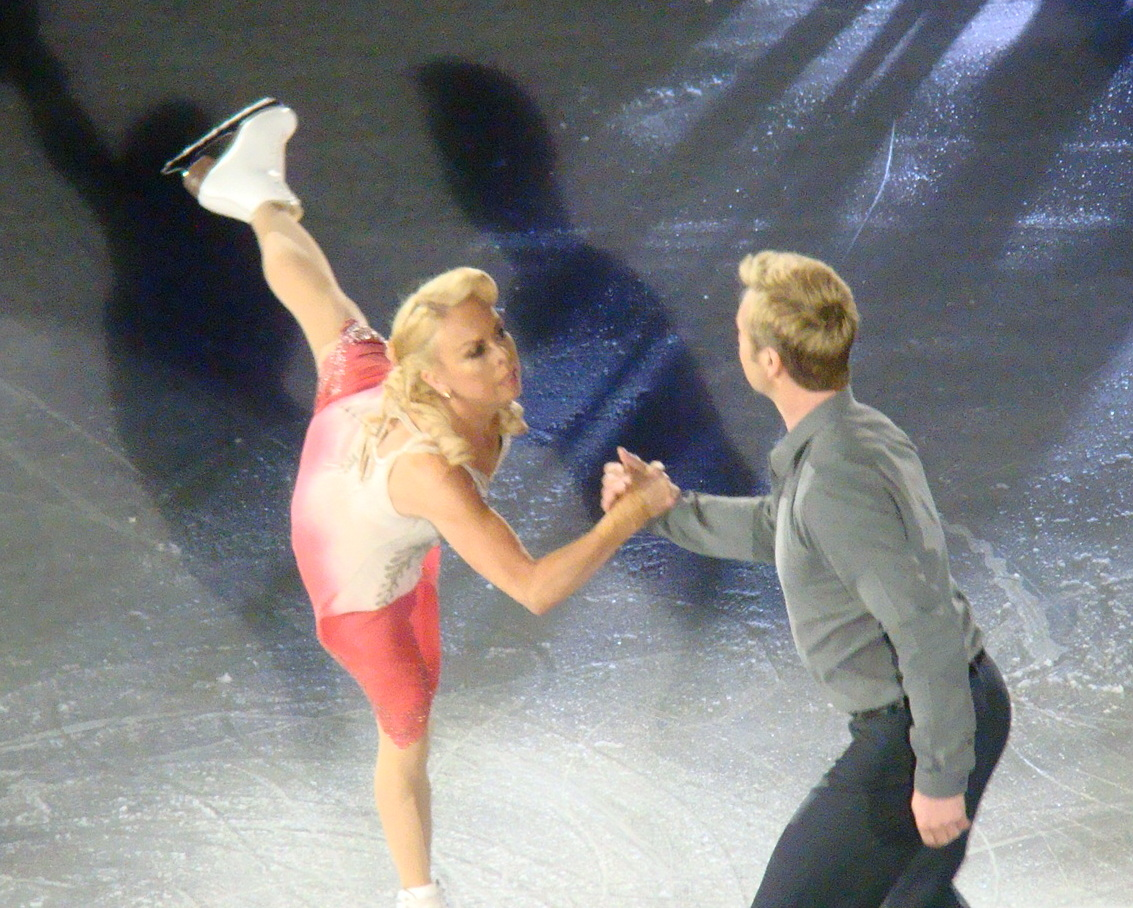
Torvill and Dean

The Auditorium has hosted numerous notable figure skating events:

- The Aud was one of the original venues that hosted Ice Capades in 1940.
- Ice Follies made its debut at the venue in 1941, and continued making regular stops after becoming Disney on Ice in 1981.
- The annual pageant to benefit the Skating Association for the Blind and Handicapped (SABAH) was staged at the venue from 1979 to 1996.
- The venue was host to the 1990 Skate America competition.

=== Combat sports ===
==== Professional wrestling ====
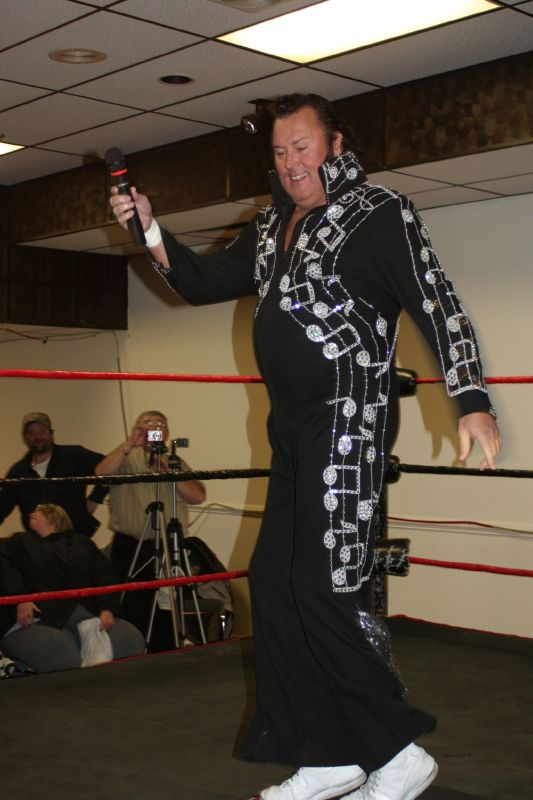
The Honky Tonk Man

The first sporting event at the venue was a Great Lakes Athletic Club professional wrestling card on October 18, 1940, that was headlined by Ed Don George defeating Joe Savoldi. Great Lakes Athletic Club owner Jack Herman continued booking shows at the venue before selling the promotion in 1947 to Ed Don George, who changed the promotion's name to Upstate Athletic Club. WBEN-TV would regularly broadcast Upstate Athletic Club's cards from the venue in 1948. Don George would later sell the promotion to his matchmaker, Ignacio "Pedro" Martinez, in 1955. Ilio DiPaolo, the son-in-law of Martinez, was the promotion's biggest star. WGR-TV broadcast Upstate Athletic Club's cards from the venue in 1956 as Wrestling from War Memorial Auditorium. Martinez would continue booking shows at The Aud until 1968, when he ran into financial trouble and was forced to promote outside the area. He returned in 1970 with his National Wrestling Federation, but the promotion folded in 1974.

Jim Crockett Promotions debuted at the venue on July 19, 1980, with a show headlined by Ric Flair and Sweet Ebony Diamond defeating Greg Valentine and The Iron Sheik.

The Honky Tonk Man defeated Ricky Steamboat to win the WWF Intercontinental Championship during a WWF Superstars of Wrestling taping at the venue on June 2, 1987.

The inaugural Ilio DiPaolo Memorial Show was held at the venue on June 7, 1996 and was headlined by The Giant defeating Sting to retain the WCW World Heavyweight Championship. DiPaolo had died the previous year after being struck by a car. It was the final sporting event at the venue, and set the venue's all-time record for professional wrestling attendance with 14,852.

==== Boxing ====
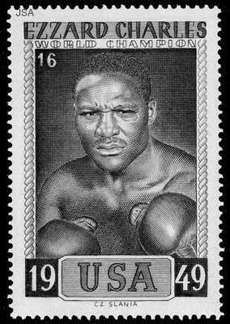
Ezzard Charles

The auditorium hosted many boxing matches, most notably:

- Ezzard Charles defeating Freddie Beshore to retain the NBA Heavyweight Title on August 15, 1950.
- Gene Hatcher defeating Johnny Bumphus to win the WBA Junior Welterweight Title on June 1, 1984. (The Ring magazine Upset of the Year)
- Livingstone Bramble defeating Ray Mancini to win the WBA Lightweight Title on June 1, 1984.
- Héctor Camacho defeating Roque Montoya to win the vacant NABF Lightweight Title on April 29, 1985.
- Tony Tubbs defeating Greg Page to win the WBA Heavyweight Title on April 29, 1985.

==== Mixed martial arts ====
UFC 7: The Brawl in Buffalo was held at the Aud on September 8, 1995. It would be the final UFC event in the state before mixed martial arts was banned by New York State in February 1997. UFC would not return to New York State until UFC 205 in 2016.

=== Concerts ===
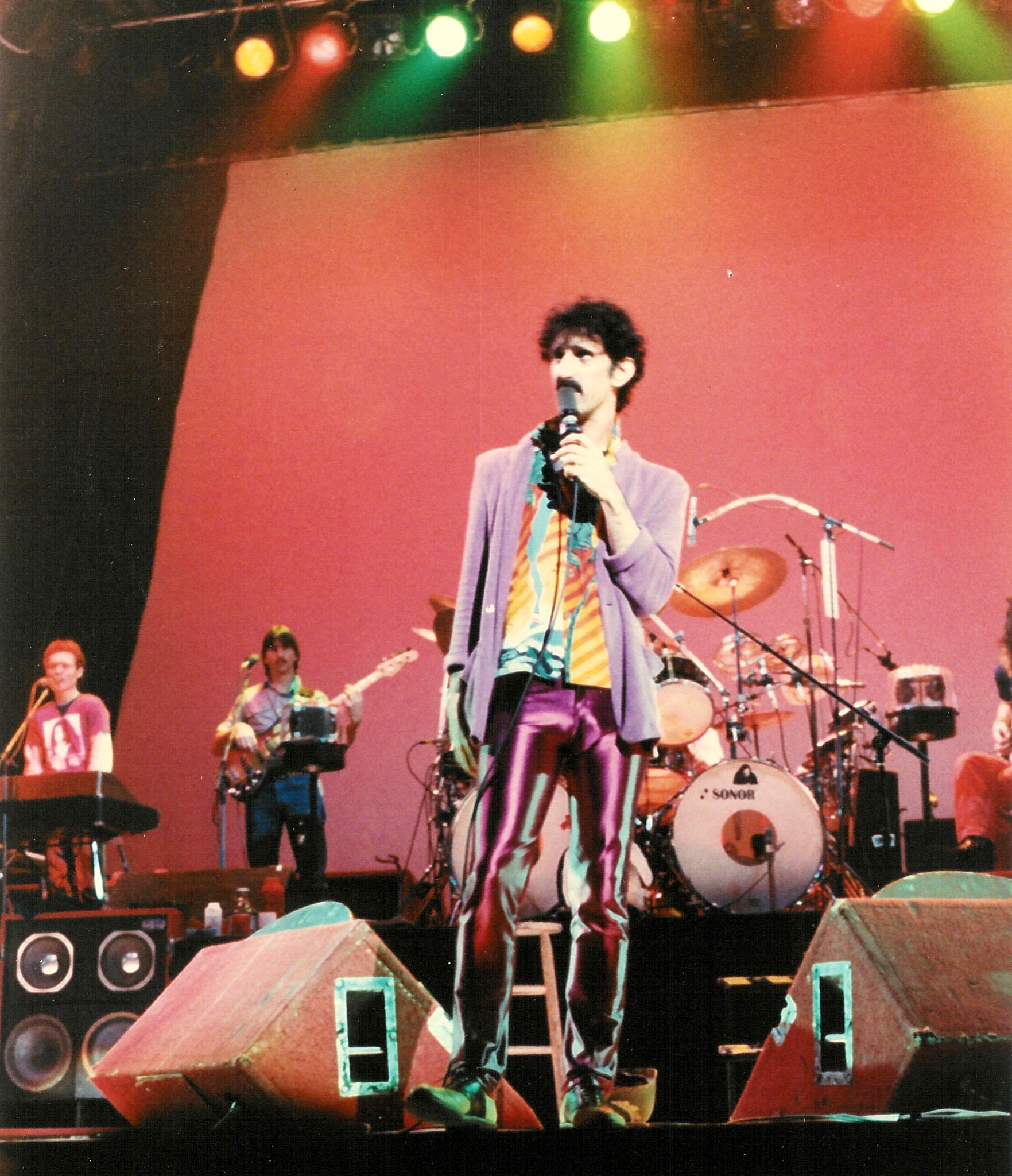
Frank Zappa at the venue in October 1980 during the recording of Buffalo

In addition to sporting events, the auditorium hosted concerts by many famous artists:

- Elvis Presley - Performed to a sold out crowd on April 5th, 1972 & June 25th, 1976
- Led Zeppelin - Performed to a sold out crowd on June 10th, 1972 & July 15th, 1973
- Frank Sinatra – October 4, 1974 (released as the album The Main Event – Live)
- Grateful Dead – May 9, 1977 (released as the Grammy-nominated album May 1977: Get Shown the Light)
- Grateful Dead – November 9, 1979 (released as the album Road Trips Volume 1 Number 1)
- The Who (The Who Tour 1979) – December 4, 1979 (dedicated to the victims of The Who concert disaster)
- Ted Nugent – September 3, 1980 (released as the album Intensities in 10 Cities)
- Frank Zappa – October 25, 1980 (released as the album Buffalo)
- Rush – May 9, 1981 (the cover of the album Exit... Stage Left was photographed at this show)

In all the Grateful Dead played the Auditorium five times between September, 1973, and September, 1981, and the Jerry Garcia Band on one more occasion in 1993.

== Special features ==
=== Tributes ===
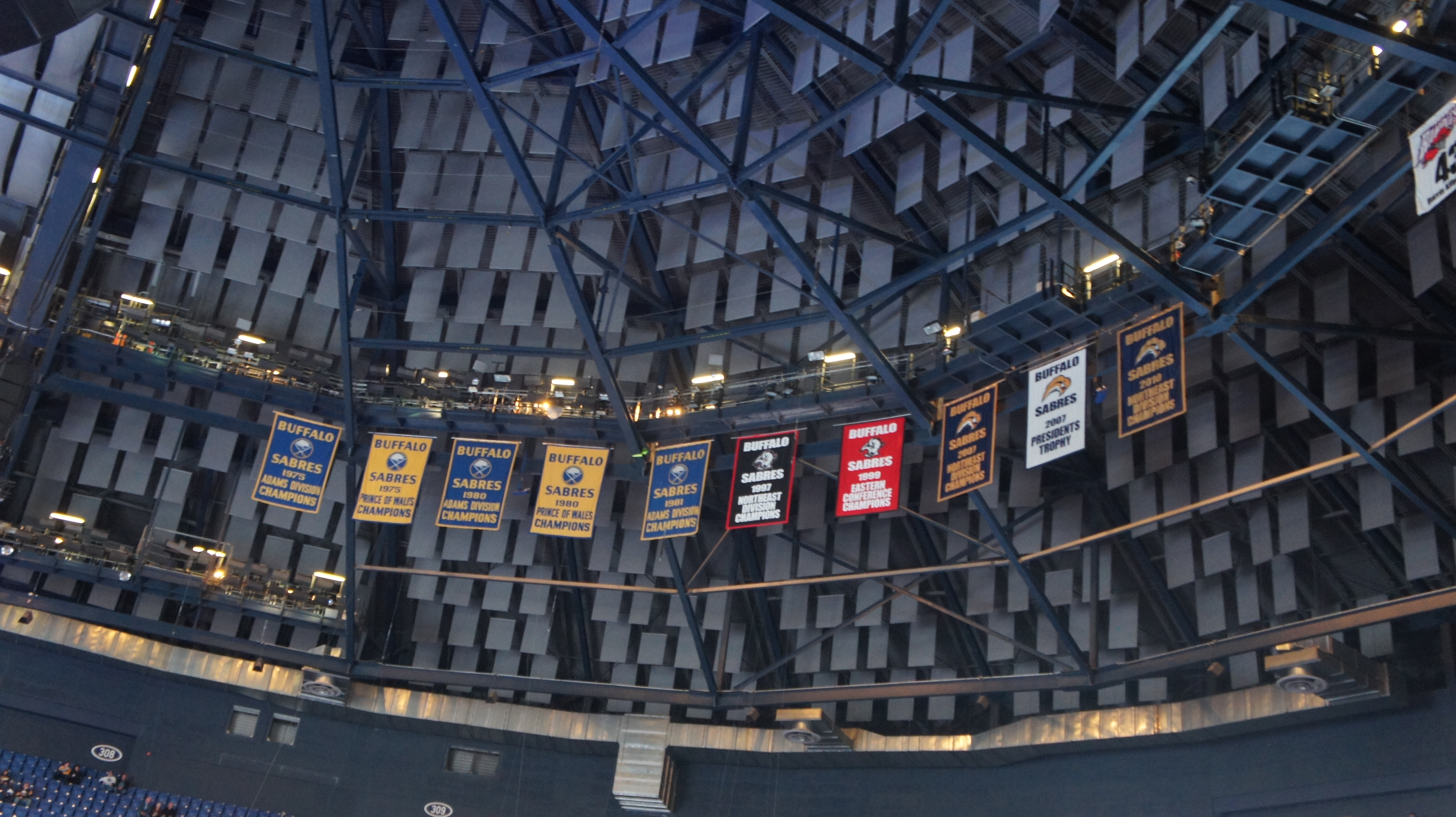
Banners at KeyBank Center

The Buffalo Sabres retired the numbers of all three members of The French Connection – Gilbert Perreault (11) in 1990, René Robert (14) in 1995, and Rick Martin (7) in 1995. The number of Tim Horton (2) was retired in 1996. Banners for all four individuals were hung in the rafters of Memorial Auditorium, and later moved to the rafters of Marine Midland Arena after the venue closed.

Championship banners were hung at the venue for the Buffalo Sabres (1975, 1980 and 1981 Division Champions & 1975 and 1980 Prince of Wales Champions), Buffalo Bandits (1992 and 1993 World Champions), and the Buffalo Stampede (1994 World Champions). Banners were also hung to recognize postseason appearances by the Canisius Golden Griffins basketball team, and commemorating the venue hosting the 1993 World University Games . Only banners for the Sabres and Bandits were relocated to Marine Midland Arena after the venue's closure.

=== Eateries ===
At the time of its closing in 1996, the Aud's concessions included:

- The Aud Club, an upscale bar and restaurant with a private entrance that was also rented out for banquets and social functions. It was designed by Philip Amigone, the architect of the Chez Ami Supper Club.
- The Pour Man's Aud Club, an affordable eatery in the venue's lobby.

Delaware North handled all concessions for the venue through its Sportservice subsidiary. The company's founder, Louis Jacobs, was the original operating manager of Buffalo Memorial Auditorium.

== Transportation access ==
The venue was served by Auditorium station (now Canalside station) of the Buffalo Metro Rail, which still stands and now services both KeyBank Center and LECOM Harborcenter.

== See also ==
- War Memorial Stadium (Buffalo, New York)

Events and tenants
Preceded by Broadway Auditorium	Home of the Canisius Golden Griffins; 1940 – 1995	Succeeded by Marine Midland Arena
Preceded by Inaugural	Home of the Buffalo Bisons; 1940 – 1970	Succeeded by –
Preceded by Broadway Auditorium	Host of the Six Days of Buffalo; 1941 – 1948	Succeeded by –
Preceded by Inaugural	Home of the Buffalo Bisons; 1946	Succeeded by Wharton Field House
Preceded by Inaugural	Home of the Buffalo Braves; 1970 – 1978	Succeeded by San Diego Sports Arena
Preceded by Inaugural	Home of the Buffalo Sabres; 1970 – 1996	Succeeded by Marine Midland Arena
Preceded by Inaugural	Home of the Toronto-Buffalo Royals; 1974	Succeeded by –
Preceded by Pacific Coliseum	Host of the NHL All-Star Game; 1978	Succeeded by Joe Louis Arena
Preceded by Inaugural	Home of the Buffalo Stallions; 1979 – 1984	Succeeded by –
Preceded by Market Square Arena	Host of Skate America; 1990	Succeeded by Oakland Coliseum Arena
Preceded by BC Place	Host of the NHL entry draft 1991	Succeeded by Montreal Forum
Preceded by Inaugural	Home of the Buffalo Bandits; 1992 – 1996	Succeeded by Marine Midland Arena
Preceded by Inaugural	Home of the Buffalo Blizzard; 1992 – 1996	Succeeded by Marine Midland Arena
Preceded by Don Valley Stadium; UK	Universiade venue 1993	Succeeded by Fukuoka Dome; Japan
Preceded by Inaugural	Home of the Buffalo Stampede; 1994 – 1995	Succeeded by –
Preceded by Casper Events Center	Ultimate Fighting Championship venue UFC 7	Succeeded by Mammoth Gardens
