= 30th National Hockey League All-Star Game =

Professional ice hockey exhibition game

30th NHL All-Star Game
	1	2	3	Total
Wales	1	1	2	4
Campbell	1	1	1	3
- Date: January 25, 1977
- Arena: Pacific Coliseum
- City: Vancouver
- MVP: Rick Martin (Buffalo)
- Attendance: 15,607

The 30th National Hockey League All-Star Game was held at the Pacific Coliseum in Vancouver, home of the Vancouver Canucks, on January 25, 1977. Wales Conference All-Star team defeated the Campbell Conference for the third consecutive year. Rick Martin scored two goals in the third period including the game-winning goal with under two minutes to play, and was voted most valuable player.

== Team Lineups ==
=== Wales Conference All-Stars ===
- Coach: (Canada) Scotty Bowman (Montreal Canadiens)

#	Nat.	Player	Pos.	Team
Goaltenders
29	(Canada)	Ken Dryden		Montreal Canadiens
30	(Canada)	Gerry Desjardins		Buffalo Sabres
Defencemen
2	(Canada)	Ian Turnbull		Toronto Maple Leafs
5	(Canada)	Guy Lapointe		Montreal Canadiens
6	(Canada)	Jim Schoenfeld		Buffalo Sabres
18	(Canada)	Serge Savard		Montreal Canadiens
19	(Canada)	Larry Robinson		Montreal Canadiens
21	(Sweden)	Borje Salming		Toronto Maple Leafs
22	(Canada)	Brad Park		Boston Bruins
Forwards
7	(Canada)	Rick Martin	LW	Buffalo Sabres
8	(United States) (Canada)	Peter McNab	C	Boston Bruins
9	(Canada)	Lanny McDonald	RW	Toronto Maple Leafs
10	(Canada)	Guy Lafleur	RW	Montreal Canadiens
12	(Canada)	Gilbert Perreault	C	Buffalo Sabres
14	(Canada)	Nick Libett	LW	Detroit Red Wings
15	(Canada)	Guy Charron	C	Washington Capitals
16	(Canada)	Marcel Dionne	C	Los Angeles Kings
20	(Canada)	Jean Pronovost	RW	Pittsburgh Penguins
23	(Canada)	Bob Gainey	LW	Montreal Canadiens
25	(Canada)	Al MacAdam	RW	Cleveland Barons

=== Campbell Conference All-Stars ===
- Coach: (Canada) Fred Shero (Philadelphia Flyers)

#	Nat.	Player	Pos.	Team
Goaltenders
1	(Canada)	Bernie Parent		Philadelphia Flyers
30	(Canada)	Glenn Resch		New York Islanders
Defencemen
2	(Canada)	Harold Snepsts		Vancouver Canucks
3	(Canada)	Tom Bladon		Philadelphia Flyers
4	(Canada)	Phil Russell		Chicago Black Hawks
5	(Canada)	Denis Potvin		New York Islanders
14	(Canada)	Joe Watson		Philadelphia Flyers
20	(Canada)	Jim Watson		Philadelphia Flyers
Forwards
7	(Canada)	Rod Gilbert	RW	New York Rangers
8	(Canada)	Garry Unger	C	St. Louis Blues
10	(Canada)	Wilf Paiement	RW	Colorado Rockies
11	(Canada)	Tom Lysiak	C	Atlanta Flames
12	(Canada)	Gary Dornhoefer	RW	Philadelphia Flyers
15	(Canada)	Don Murdoch	RW	New York Rangers
16	(Canada)	Bobby Clarke	C	Philadelphia Flyers
17	(Canada)	Tim Young	C	Minnesota North Stars
19	(Canada)	Rick MacLeish	C	Philadelphia Flyers
23	(Canada) (Sweden)	Bob Nystrom	RW	New York Islanders
27	(Canada)	Eric Vail	LW	Atlanta Flames
77	(Canada)	Phil Esposito	C	New York Rangers

G = Goaltenders; D = Defencemen; C = Centre; LW/RW = Left Wing/Right Wing

== Game summary ==
#	Score	Team	Goalscorer (Assist(s))	To,e
First period
1	0-1	Campbell	Vail (Potvin)	2:54
2	1-1	Wales	McDonald (Gainey - McNab)	6:22
Penalties : Campbell bench 15:32; Dornhoefer (Cam.) 16:24; Lapointe (Wal.) 16:24
Second period
3	1-2	Campbell	MacLeish (Nystrom - Potvin)	11:56
4	2-2	Wales	McDonald (Perreault - Robinson)	19:27
Penalties : Potvin (Cam.) 4:11; Lapointe (Wal.) 5:08; Paiement (Cam.) 8:34; Joe Watson (Cam.) 14:02
Third period
5	3-2	Wales	Martin (Dionne - Robinson)	4:00
6	3-3	Campbell	Esposito (Gilbert - Dornhoefer)	12:23
7	4-3	Wales	Martin (Dionne - Lafleur)	18:04
Penalties : Russell (Cam.) 3:17; Salming (Wal.) 15:48

Goaltenders :

- Wales : Dryden (31:27 minutes), Desjardins (28:33 minutes).
- Campbell : Parent (31:27 minutes), Resch (27:41 minutes).

Shots on goal :

- Wales (36) 14 - 10 - 12
- Campbell (25) 10 - 08 - 07

Referee : Bruce Hood

Linesmen : Matt Pavelich, Ron Finn

== See also ==
- 1976–77 NHL season
