= René Robert =

Canadian ice hockey player (1948–2021)

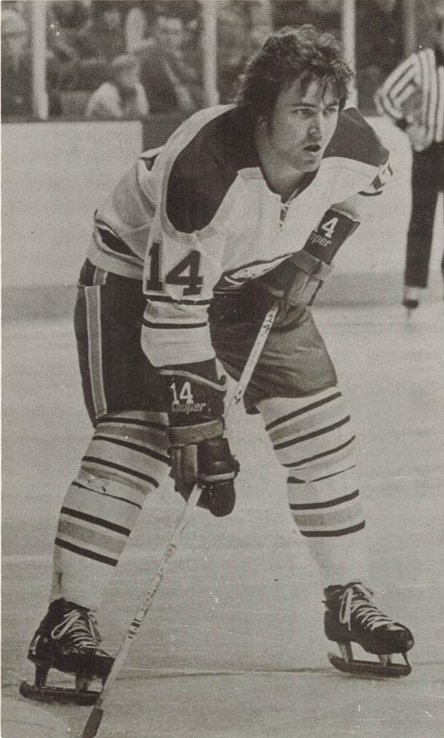
- Robert with the Buffalo Sabres in 1974
- Born: December 31, 1948 Trois-Rivières, Quebec, Canada
- Died: June 22, 2021 (aged 72) Port Charlotte, Florida, U.S.
- Height: 5 ft 10 in (178 cm)
- Weight: 184 lb (83 kg; 13 st 2 lb)
- Position: Right wing
- Shot: Right
- Played for: Toronto Maple Leafs; Pittsburgh Penguins; Buffalo Sabres; Colorado Rockies
- National team: Canada
- Playing career: 1968–1982

René Paul Robert (December 31, 1948 – June 22, 2021) was a Canadian professional ice hockey winger who played 12 seasons in the National Hockey League (NHL). He played for the Toronto Maple Leafs, Pittsburgh Penguins, Buffalo Sabres, and Colorado Rockies from 1970 to 1982. He made two All-Star appearances and was selected as the second NHL All-Star team right wing in 1974–75. He also played in the 1975 Stanley Cup Finals with the Sabres, in which he scored the game-winning goal in Game 3.

== Early life ==
Robert was born in Trois-Rivières, on December 31, 1948. As a youth, he played in the 1961 Quebec International Pee-Wee Hockey Tournament with Trois-Rivières. While playing for the Trois-Rivieres Maple Leafs of the Quebec Junior A Hockey League in 1967–68, he set the QJAHL record with 69 goals in 49 games, a record that has subsequently been broken. He was signed by the Toronto Maple Leafs to a five-game tryout contract on March 20, 1968.

== Playing career ==
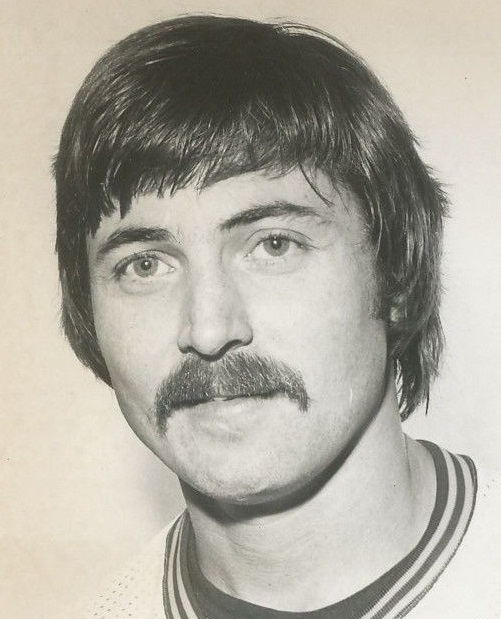
Robert with the Colorado Rockies in 1980.

Robert made his NHL debut with the Maple Leafs in 1970–71. He played five games during his first season and did not record any points. He was claimed by the Pittsburgh Penguins on June 8, 1971, in the NHL Intra-League Draft. He played most of the 1971–72 season with that franchise until he was traded to the Buffalo Sabres for Eddie Shack on March 4, 1972. He was subsequently placed in the same forward line as center Gilbert Perreault and left winger Rick Martin, and the trio became known as The French Connection. A statue of the famous forward line, unveiled in 2012, is located in front the Sabres arena, KeyBank Center.

In his first season with the Sabres, Robert led the franchise in goals with 40, and he was named to his first NHL All-Star Game. The team then unexpectedly advanced to the 1973 Stanley Cup playoffs, with Robert scoring the franchise's first overtime goal on April 10, 1973, in Game 5 against the Montreal Canadiens, who went on to win the series. Robert's best offensive season came during the 1974–75 season, when he recorded 40 goals and 60 assists for 100 points. It was the Sabres' first 100-point season by an individual, and he was also named to the second NHL All-Star team that year. In Game 3 of the 1975 Stanley Cup Finals, dubbed the "Fog Game", Robert scored after 18:29 of overtime against the Philadelphia Flyers to help the Sabres win their first game of the series. The Flyers ultimately clinched the Cup in six games. Robert led the league in games played (80) and hat-tricks (3) the following season. He was traded to the Colorado Rockies on October 5, 1979, in exchange for defenceman John Van Boxmeer. Robert was named captain of the Rockies, before being traded on January 30, 1981, to the Maple Leafs, with whom he played his final season in 1981–82. He finished his NHL career with 744 games, recording 284 goals and 418 assists for 702 points.

== Later life ==
After retiring from professional ice hockey, Robert acted as president of the NHL Alumni Association. He was inducted into the Buffalo Sabres Hall of Fame along with Perreault and Martin in 1989. His number 14 was retired by the Sabres on November 15, 1995, along with Rick Martin's number 7 jersey. They were reunited with Perreault whose number 11 was retired in a 1990 ceremony.

Robert divided his time between Western New York and Florida. The driveway at his home in Buffalo was constructed from pieces of the Buffalo Memorial Auditorium after its demolition in 2009. He had a heart attack on June 18, 2021, and was placed on life support. He died four days later on June 22 at a hospital in Port Charlotte, Florida, at the age of 72.

== Career statistics ==
=== Regular season and playoffs ===
			Regular season					Playoffs
Season	Team	League	GP	G	A	Pts	PIM	GP	G	A	Pts	PIM
1965–66	Trois-Rivières Leafs	QJHL	42	13	38	51	31	5	0	2	2	7
1966–67	Trois-Rivières Leafs	QJHL	41	34	32	66	73	11	5	12	17	15
1967–68	Trois-Rivières Leafs	QJHL	49	69	74	143	—	4	3	5	8	4
1967–68	Tulsa Oilers	CPHL	3	0	2	2	0	2	0	4	4	14
1968–69	Tulsa Oilers	CHL	59	21	30	51	57	7	4	3	7	2
1969–70	Vancouver Canucks	WHL	5	0	0	0	2	—	—	—	—	—
1969–70	Rochester Americans	AHL	49	23	40	63	57	—	—	—	—	—
1970–71	Toronto Maple Leafs	NHL	5	0	0	0	0	—	—	—	—	—
1970–71	Tulsa Oilers	CHL	58	26	36	62	85	—	—	—	—	—
1970–71	Phoenix Roadrunners	WHL	7	4	3	7	6	10	5	3	8	7
1971–72	Pittsburgh Penguins	NHL	49	7	11	18	42	—	—	—	—	—
1971–72	Buffalo Sabres	NHL	12	6	3	9	2	—	—	—	—	—
1972–73	Buffalo Sabres	NHL	75	40	43	83	83	6	5	3	8	2
1973–74	Buffalo Sabres	NHL	76	21	44	65	71	—	—	—	—	—
1974–75	Buffalo Sabres	NHL	74	40	60	100	75	16	5	8	13	16
1975–76	Buffalo Sabres	NHL	72	35	52	87	53	9	3	2	5	6
1976–77	Buffalo Sabres	NHL	80	33	40	73	46	6	5	2	7	20
1977–78	Buffalo Sabres	NHL	67	25	48	73	25	7	2	0	2	23
1978–79	Buffalo Sabres	NHL	68	22	40	62	46	3	2	2	4	4
1979–80	Colorado Rockies	NHL	69	28	35	63	79	—	—	—	—	—
1980–81	Colorado Rockies	NHL	28	8	11	19	30	—	—	—	—	—
1980–81	Toronto Maple Leafs	NHL	14	6	7	13	8	3	0	2	2	2
1981–82	Toronto Maple Leafs	NHL	55	13	24	37	37	—	—	—	—	—
NHL totals			744	284	418	702	597	50	22	19	41	73

Preceded by Mike Christie	Colorado Rockies captain 1980–81	Succeeded by Lanny McDonald
