= Larry Carriere =

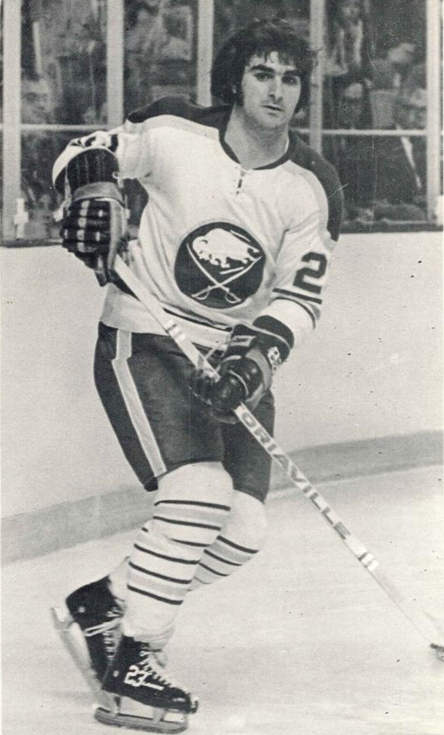
- Born: January 30, 1952 (age 74) Montreal, Quebec, Canada
- Height: 6 ft 1 in (185 cm)
- Weight: 190 lb (86 kg; 13 st 8 lb)
- Position: Defence
- Shot: Left
- Played for: Buffalo Sabres; Atlanta Flames; Vancouver Canucks; Los Angeles Kings; Toronto Maple Leafs
- NHL draft: 25th overall, 1972; Buffalo Sabres
- Playing career: 1972–1980

Lawrence Robert Carrière (born January 30, 1952) is a Canadian former professional ice hockey defenceman and executive. He was drafted in the second round, 25th overall, by the Buffalo Sabres in the 1972 NHL Amateur Draft. He played in the National Hockey League with the Sabres, Atlanta Flames, Vancouver Canucks, Los Angeles Kings, and Toronto Maple Leafs.

In his NHL career, Carrière appeared in 367 games. He scored 16 goals and added 74 assists.

After retiring as a player, Carrière spent 20 years with the Sabres as a scout and executive, and five with the Washington Capitals as a scout.

On July 16, 2010, Carrière joined the Montreal Canadiens as assistant general manager and director of player personnel. Carrière became an assistant coach with the Canadiens on December 17, 2011. In June 2017, Carrière was named general manager of the Laval Rocket while maintaining his assistant general manager duties for Marc Bergevin. He stepped down from the Rocket general manager role after one year, and was also replaced as Canadiens assistant general manager by director of player personnel Trevor Timmins. Carrière remained with the Canadiens as a senior advisor until the end of the 2019-20 season, after which his contract was not renewed.

== Career statistics ==
=== Regular season and playoffs ===
| | | | Regular season | | | | | Playoffs |
| Season | Team | League | GP | G | A | Pts | PIM | GP | G | A | Pts | PIM |
|---|---|---|---|---|---|---|---|---|---|---|---|---|
| 1969–70 | Loyola College | CIAU | 32 | 10 | 34 | 44 | — | — | — | — | — | — |
| 1970–71 | Loyola College | CIAU | 27 | 8 | 24 | 32 | 72 | — | — | — | — | — |
| 1971–72 | Loyola College | CIAU | 32 | 20 | 29 | 49 | 69 | — | — | — | — | — |
| 1972–73 | Cincinnati Swords | AHL | 30 | 7 | 11 | 18 | 54 | — | — | — | — | — |
| 1972–73 | Buffalo Sabres | NHL | 40 | 2 | 8 | 10 | 52 | 6 | 0 | 1 | 1 | 8 |
| 1973–74 | Buffalo Sabres | NHL | 78 | 6 | 24 | 30 | 103 | — | — | — | — | — |
| 1974–75 | Buffalo Sabres | NHL | 80 | 1 | 11 | 12 | 111 | 17 | 0 | 2 | 2 | 32 |
| 1975–76 | Atlanta Flames | NHL | 75 | 4 | 15 | 19 | 96 | 2 | 0 | 0 | 0 | 2 |
| 1976–77 | Atlanta Flames | NHL | 25 | 2 | 3 | 5 | 16 | — | — | — | — | — |
| 1976–77 | Vancouver Canucks | NHL | 49 | 1 | 9 | 10 | 55 | — | — | — | — | — |
| 1977–78 | Tulsa Oilers | CHL | 6 | 0 | 1 | 1 | 12 | — | — | — | — | — |
| 1977–78 | Springfield Indians | AHL | 40 | 2 | 14 | 16 | 33 | — | — | — | — | — |
| 1977–78 | Vancouver Canucks | NHL | 7 | 0 | 3 | 3 | 11 | — | — | — | — | — |
| 1977–78 | Los Angeles Kings | NHL | 2 | 0 | 0 | 0 | 0 | — | — | — | — | — |
| 1977–78 | Buffalo Sabres | NHL | 9 | 0 | 0 | 0 | 18 | — | — | — | — | — |
| 1979–80 | Toronto Maple Leafs | NHL | 2 | 0 | 1 | 1 | 0 | 2 | 0 | 0 | 0 | 0 |
| NHL totals | | | 367 | 16 | 74 | 90 | 462 | 27 | 0 | 3 | 3 | 42 |
