= Don Saleski =

Canadian ice hockey player

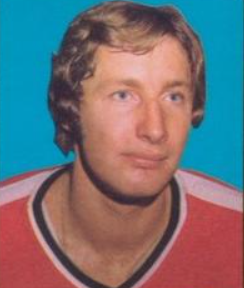
- Saleski in 1972 card
- Born: November 10, 1949 (age 76) Moose Jaw, Saskatchewan, Canada
- Height: 6 ft 3 in (191 cm)
- Weight: 186 lb (84 kg; 13 st 4 lb)
- Position: Right wing
- Shot: Right
- Played for: Philadelphia Flyers; Colorado Rockies
- NHL draft: 64th overall, 1969; Philadelphia Flyers
- Playing career: 1970–1980

Donald Patrick Saleski (born November 10, 1949), nicknamed "Big Bird", is a Canadian former professional ice hockey right winger who played nine seasons in the National Hockey League (NHL) for the Philadelphia Flyers and Colorado Rockies.

== Playing career ==
Saleski was drafted in the 6th round, 64th overall, by the Philadelphia Flyers in 1969 NHL amateur draft. He played in 543 career NHL games, scoring 128 goals and 125 assists for 253 career points. He played the bulk of his career (eight seasons, 1969–1977) with the Philadelphia Flyers, including their Stanley Cup winning teams of 1973–74 and 1974–75. He played the final two seasons of his career (1978–1979) with the Colorado Rockies.

== Career statistics ==
=== Regular season and playoffs ===
| | | | Regular season | | | | | Playoffs |
| Season | Team | League | GP | G | A | Pts | PIM | GP | G | A | Pts | PIM |
|---|---|---|---|---|---|---|---|---|---|---|---|---|
| 1966–67 | Regina Pats | CMJHL | 38 | 3 | 2 | 5 | 6 | 3 | 0 | 0 | 0 | 0 |
| 1967–68 | Regina Pats | WCHL | 58 | 6 | 9 | 15 | 34 | — | — | — | — | — |
| 1968–69 | Regina Pats | SJHL | 40 | 33 | 25 | 58 | 117 | — | — | — | — | — |
| 1968–69 | Regina Pats | M-Cup | — | — | — | — | — | 11 | 6 | 6 | 12 | 19 |
| 1969–70 | Winnipeg Jets | WCHL | 2 | 1 | 0 | 1 | 12 | — | — | — | — | — |
| 1969–70 | Saskatoon Blades | WCHL | 3 | 0 | 1 | 1 | 4 | — | — | — | — | — |
| 1970–71 | Quebec Aces | AHL | 72 | 9 | 7 | 16 | 51 | 1 | 0 | 0 | 0 | 0 |
| 1971–72 | Philadelphia Flyers | NHL | 1 | 0 | 0 | 0 | 0 | — | — | — | — | — |
| 1971–72 | Richmond Robins | AHL | 73 | 22 | 35 | 57 | 111 | — | — | — | — | — |
| 1972–73 | Philadelphia Flyers | NHL | 78 | 12 | 9 | 21 | 205 | 11 | 1 | 2 | 3 | 4 |
| 1973–74 | Philadelphia Flyers | NHL | 77 | 15 | 25 | 40 | 131 | 17 | 2 | 7 | 9 | 24 |
| 1974–75 | Philadelphia Flyers | NHL | 63 | 10 | 18 | 28 | 107 | 17 | 2 | 3 | 5 | 25 |
| 1975–76 | Philadelphia Flyers | NHL | 78 | 21 | 26 | 47 | 68 | 16 | 6 | 5 | 11 | 47 |
| 1976–77 | Philadelphia Flyers | NHL | 74 | 22 | 16 | 38 | 33 | 10 | 0 | 0 | 0 | 12 |
| 1977–78 | Philadelphia Flyers | NHL | 70 | 27 | 18 | 45 | 44 | 11 | 2 | 0 | 2 | 19 |
| 1978–79 | Philadelphia Flyers | NHL | 35 | 11 | 5 | 16 | 14 | — | — | — | — | — |
| 1978–79 | Colorado Rockies | NHL | 16 | 2 | 0 | 2 | 4 | — | — | — | — | — |
| 1979–80 | Colorado Rockies | NHL | 51 | 8 | 8 | 16 | 23 | — | — | — | — | — |
| 1979–80 | Fort Worth Texans | CHL | 19 | 9 | 6 | 15 | 18 | 14 | 5 | 6 | 11 | 20 |
| NHL totals | | | 543 | 128 | 125 | 253 | 629 | 82 | 13 | 17 | 30 | 131 |
