= Gilbert Perreault =

Canadian ice hockey player (born 1950)

- Hockey Hall of Fame, 1990
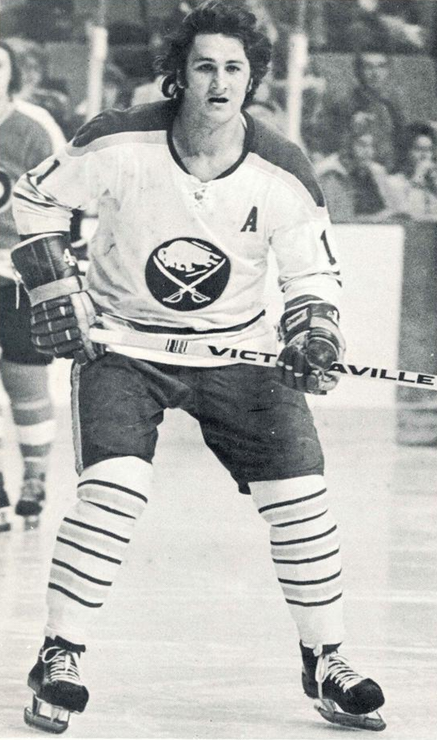
- Perreault with the Buffalo Sabres in 1975
- Born: November 13, 1950 (age 75) Victoriaville, Quebec, Canada
- Height: 6 ft 1 in (185 cm)
- Weight: 185 lb (84 kg; 13 st 3 lb)
- Position: Centre
- Shot: Left
- Played for: Buffalo Sabres
- National team: Canada
- NHL draft: 1st overall, 1970; Buffalo Sabres
- Playing career: 1970–1987

Gilbert Perreault (born November 13, 1950) is a Canadian former professional ice hockey center who played for 17 seasons with the National Hockey League (NHL)'s Buffalo Sabres. He was the first draft pick of the Sabres in their inaugural season in the NHL. He is well known as the centre man for the prolific trio of Sabres forwards known as The French Connection. The trio helped the Sabres reach the 1975 Stanley Cup Final.

He was inducted into the Hockey Hall of Fame in 1990. Known for his ability to stickhandle in close quarters, he is regarded as one of the most skillful playmaking centers of all time. In 2017 Perreault was named one of the '100 Greatest NHL Players' in history.

Perreault was a standout junior hockey player who went on to be selected to nine National Hockey League All-Star Games and two post-season NHL All-Star teams (second team centre), while winning the Calder Memorial Trophy and a Lady Byng Trophy, and being selected to the Hockey Hall of Fame. He played his entire 17-year career with the Buffalo Sabres and continues to be the all-time franchise leader in career regular season games played, goals, assists, points, game-winning goals, and shots on goal, serving as the team's captain from 1981 until his retirement in November 1986. He led the team to 11 consecutive playoff appearances ending with the 1984–85 season.

Over the course of his 17-season career he accumulated 512 goals and 814 assists in 1191 games. Among his career highlights was the game-winning goal in overtime of the 1978 National Hockey League All-Star Game played at the Buffalo Memorial Auditorium. Perreault once totaled seven points in a single game, which remains a Sabres record. He also recorded the first power play goal and the first hat trick in the team's history. He is the only Buffalo Sabre to wear number 11, with the number being retired in his honor.

== Early life ==
Perreault began playing organized hockey at about age six. He preferred street hockey to playing on the ice and did not skate until he was eight. He began playing minor ice hockey at age nine. He played in the 1961, 1962 and 1963 Quebec International Pee-Wee Hockey Tournaments with Victoriaville. He left home at the age of 16 to join his first junior hockey team. His first year (1966–67) of junior hockey was spent with Thetford Mines in the Quebec Junior A League. His teammates included Marc Tardif. The team won the league championships.

== Playing career ==
=== Amateur career ===
After the Quebec Junior A League shut down, Perreault joined the Montreal Junior Canadiens of the Ontario Hockey Association (OHA) for the 1967–68 season, the first of three years with the Junior Canadiens. His 49 points in 47 games helped the Junior Canadiens to a second-place finish. During his second year on the team, one that included future NHL talents Réjean Houle and André Dupont as well as future professional teammates Jocelyn Guevremont and Richard Martin, Perreault blossomed. His 97 points were second on the team to Houle's 108 points, and they earned him OHA first All-Star team honours. As Perreault blossomed, the team excelled. In his second season, the team finished first in the OHA and won the 1969 Memorial Cup Canadian Junior championship. It was the first Memorial Cup win for Montreal since 1950.

After Houle moved on to become the NHL's first overall pick, Perreault assumed the leadership role and compiled a 51-goal, 71 assist season, which led the team in both categories and place second in the league to Marcel Dionne's 132 points. The Canadiens defeated the Weyburn Red Wings to become the third junior team to successfully defend their championship and the Memorial Cup. Perreault was named the Ontario Hockey Association most valuable player.

The record of the 1969 and 1970 Montreal Junior Canadiens in the playoffs was so outstanding it caused a change in Memorial Cup eligibility rules. Previously, all Junior clubs in Canada were eligible for the cup, but the Junior Canadiens beat a club from Prince Edward Island so badly in the playoffs that 'Junior A' was re-organized into 'Major Junior' and 'Junior A'. Since then, only Major Junior clubs are eligible for the Cup.

=== Professional career ===
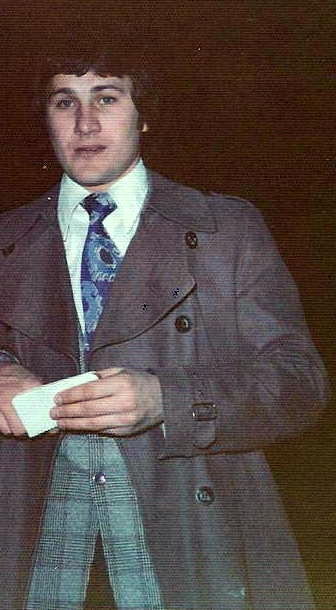
Perreault at Boston Garden c. 1975

In 1970, two new franchises were awarded in the NHL — the Buffalo Sabres and the Vancouver Canucks. It was a foregone conclusion Perreault would be the first selection in the 1970 amateur draft. The two new teams took part in a roulette wheel spin to determine who would get the first pick. Ultimately, the Canucks were allocated numbers 2–6 on the wheel, while the Sabres had 8–12 (The number 7 spot was neutral, meaning the pointer landing on it would have required a re-spin). When league president Clarence Campbell spun the wheel, he initially thought the pointer landed on 1 (in reality, the wheel had no number 1 spot) and started to congratulate the Vancouver delegation. However, Sabres coach/general manager Punch Imlach asked Campbell to check again. As it turned out, the pointer was on 11. Imlach had chosen 8-12 for the roulette wheel spin because it included 11, which was his favourite number. This was the first year the Montreal Canadiens did not have a priority right to draft Québécois junior players. Consequently, Perreault was available and taken first overall by the Sabres.

Coincidentally, Perreault had worn #11 throughout his junior career, and kept it in Buffalo in honour of the roulette wheel choice. As expected, he became an immediate star. He scored a goal in the franchise's very first game, which was a 2–1 victory on October 10, 1970, against the Pittsburgh Penguins. During his first season, he led the Sabres in scoring (with 38 goals and added 34 assists) — a feat he would never fail to accomplish in any season in which he did not miss significant time to injury before his penultimate year — and won the Calder Trophy as rookie of the year.

Perreault developed a reputation as a superb stickhandler, and scored a goal on his first shift in a professional scrimmage. Bobby Orr once said of Perreault: "His head and shoulders go one way, his legs go the other way, and the puck is doing something else. When I first saw it I couldn't believe it." His popularity and respect surpassed O. J. Simpson in a poll of Buffalonians about the best Buffalo athlete. Phil Esposito once said if anyone was to break his 76-goal, 152 point season records "It will be Gilbert Perreault."

Before the 1971–72 NHL season the Sabres drafted Perreault's Junior Canadiens teammate, Rick Martin, with their first pick. The two jelled as a tandem with each scoring 74 points. Late in the season the Sabres traded Eddie Shack for Rene Robert. The trio formed one of the decade's most memorable and exciting lines, known as "The French Connection" with Robert on right wing and Martin on left wing. They ended the following 1972–73 season sweeping the top three scoring positions for the team and leading the franchise to its first playoff appearance with Perreault winning the Lady Byng Trophy as the most gentlemanly player. In 1973–74, Perreault endured a broken leg that limited him to 55 games.

The 1974–75 NHL season was memorable for the Sabres' Stanley Cup Final appearance. The Sabres finished first in the newly reformatted league's Adams Division, and the French Connection members each finished in the top ten in league scoring. The Sabres defeated original six teams Chicago Black Hawks and Montreal Canadiens on their way to a Finals appearance against the Philadelphia Flyers. The Sabres lost the series four games to two. 1975 was the closest Perreault would come to winning the Stanley Cup.

=== International career ===
Perreault was named to the Canadian national team ("Team Canada") that participated in the 1972 Summit Series against the Soviet Union. He managed to contribute two points in two games but left the team after game five.

In 1976, Canada hosted the first Canada Cup series. Perreault played with future Hockey Hall of Fame members such as Bobby Orr, Darryl Sittler, Bobby Hull, Guy Lafleur and Marcel Dionne. Perreault often played on a line with fellow Québécois Lafleur and Dionne. Canada won the series after beating Czechoslovakia in a best two out of three. He later played in the 1981 Canada Cup on a line with Wayne Gretzky and Lafleur. He was playing some of the best hockey of his career, leading all scorers with nine points in four games, when he was forced out of the tournament with a broken ankle. Canada lost the final to the USSR 8–1. Perreault was named to the All Tournament Team, despite playing in only four of Canada's seven games.

== Retirement ==
On March 9, 1986, Perreault scored his 500th career goal against the New Jersey Devils at Buffalo Memorial Auditorium to become the first (and so far only) Sabre with 500 goals. Perreault retired at the end of the 1985–86 season. Thereafter, pension changes came into effect significantly boosting the pensions of retired players who played at least 20 games in the 1986-87 season. He duly came out of retirement and still played effectively, scoring 9 goals in the first 14 games. He retired for good on November 24, 1986, after his 20th game.

He finished his career with scoring totals of 512 goals and 814 assists for 1326 points in 1191 games. At the time of his retirement, Perreault was the sixth leading scorer in NHL history. Along with the other two members of the French Connection, Perreault was inducted into the Buffalo Sabres Hall of Fame in 1989. He was inducted into the Hockey Hall of Fame in 1990, and the Sabres retired his number 11 in the same year, having been the only player to ever wear number 11 for the Buffalo Sabres; his #11 was the first number retired by the Sabres. When his French Connection linemates' numbers were retired, Perreault's #11 was lowered and raised back between Martin's #7 and Robert's #14, as the Buffalo Sabres retired the French Connection line as a group, marking the first three players to have their numbers retired by the Sabres. A statue of "The French Connection," unveiled in 2012, is located outside of the Sabres' arena, known today as KeyBank Center.

Since his retirement from hockey, Perreault has remained active in the game, coaching Junior teams in the Quebec Major Junior Hockey League. In addition, he also plays on occasion with the Buffalo Sabres Alumni Hockey Team for charity events.

== Personal life ==
Perreault was married to Carmen Caron for fifty years until her death from cancer in the summer of 2023. He has two sons, Marc-André (born 1978), a pharmaceutical salesman, and Sean (born 1986), an English teacher in Victoriaville who was a baby when Perreault retired. Perreault still resides in his hometown of Victoriaville, Quebec. After retiring from playing, Perreault coached junior ice hockey, and invested in real estate. In his spare time, Perreault enjoys golfing, listening to music, and going to the movies.

== Career achievements ==
- Holds franchise record for most games (1191), goals (512), assists (814) and points (1326) with the Buffalo Sabres.
- Won the Calder Memorial Trophy in 1971.
- Won the Lady Byng Memorial Trophy in 1973.
- Named an NHL second team All-Star in 1976 and 1977.
- Chosen to play in eight NHL All-Star Games in 1970–71, 1971–72, 1973–74, 1974–75, 1976–77, 1977–78, 1979–80, and 1983–84, as well as the 1979 Challenge Cup, which pitted NHL players against a team representing the Soviet Union, in place of an all-star game in 1979.
- In 1998, he was ranked number 47 on The Hockey News' list of the 100 Greatest Hockey Players.

== Career statistics ==
=== Regular season and playoffs ===
			Regular season					Playoffs
Season	Team	League	GP	G	A	Pts	PIM	GP	G	A	Pts	PIM
1967–68	Montreal Jr. Canadiens	OHA-Jr.	47	15	34	49	10	11	8	9	17	5
1968–69	Montreal Jr. Canadiens	OHA-Jr.	54	37	60	97	29	14	5	10	15	10
1969–70	Montreal Jr. Canadiens	OHA-Jr.	54	51	71	121	26	16	17	21	38	4
1970–71	Buffalo Sabres	NHL	78	38	34	72	19	—	—	—	—	—
1971–72	Buffalo Sabres	NHL	76	26	48	74	24	—	—	—	—	—
1972–73	Buffalo Sabres	NHL	78	28	60	88	10	6	3	7	10	2
1973–74	Buffalo Sabres	NHL	55	18	33	51	10	—	—	—	—	—
1974–75	Buffalo Sabres	NHL	68	39	57	96	36	17	6	9	15	10
1975–76	Buffalo Sabres	NHL	80	44	69	113	36	9	4	4	8	4
1976–77	Buffalo Sabres	NHL	80	39	56	95	30	6	1	8	9	4
1977–78	Buffalo Sabres	NHL	79	41	48	89	20	8	3	2	5	0
1978–79	Buffalo Sabres	NHL	79	27	58	85	20	3	1	0	1	2
1979–80	Buffalo Sabres	NHL	80	40	66	106	57	14	10	11	21	8
1980–81	Buffalo Sabres	NHL	56	20	39	59	56	8	2	10	12	2
1981–82	Buffalo Sabres	NHL	62	31	42	73	40	4	0	7	7	0
1982–83	Buffalo Sabres	NHL	77	30	46	76	34	10	0	7	7	8
1983–84	Buffalo Sabres	NHL	73	31	59	90	32	—	—	—	—	—
1984–85	Buffalo Sabres	NHL	78	30	53	83	42	5	3	5	8	4
1985–86	Buffalo Sabres	NHL	72	21	39	60	28	—	—	—	—	—
1986–87	Buffalo Sabres	NHL	20	9	7	16	6	—	—	—	—	—
NHL totals			1,191	512	814	1,326	500	90	33	70	103	44

=== International ===
Year	Team	Event	GP	G	A	Pts	PIM
1972	Canada	SS	2	1	1	2	0
1976	Canada	CC	7	4	4	8	2
1981	Canada	CC	4	3	6	9	2
Senior totals			13	8	11	19	4

== See also ==
- List of NHL players with 500 goals
- List of NHL players with 1000 points
- List of NHL statistical leaders

== Notes ==
Preceded by Rejean Houle	NHL first overall draft pick 1970	Succeeded by Guy Lafleur
Preceded by None	Buffalo Sabres first-round draft pick 1970	Succeeded by Rick Martin
Preceded by Danny Gare	Buffalo Sabres captain 1981–86	Succeeded by Lindy Ruff
Preceded by Tony Esposito	Winner of the Calder Memorial Trophy; 1971	Succeeded by Ken Dryden
Preceded by Jean Ratelle	Winner of the Lady Byng Trophy; 1973	Succeeded by John Bucyk
