= Rick Martin =

Canadian ice hockey player (1951–2011)

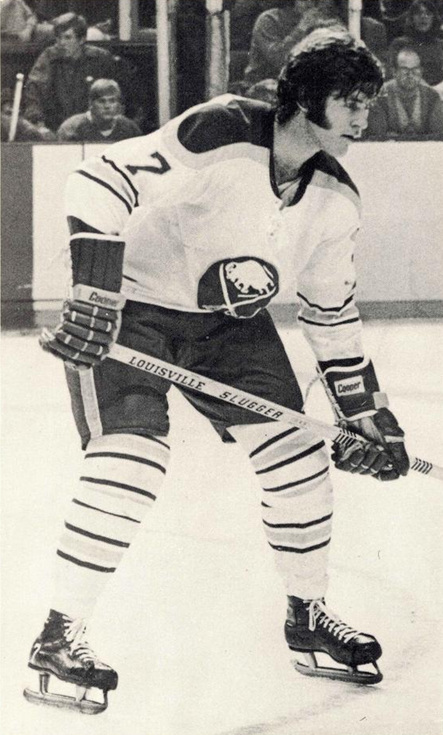
- Martin with the Buffalo Sabres in 1972
- Born: July 26, 1951 Verdun, Quebec, Canada
- Died: March 13, 2011 (aged 59) Clarence, New York, U.S.
- Height: 5 ft 11 in (180 cm)
- Weight: 179 lb (81 kg; 12 st 11 lb)
- Position: Left wing
- Shot: Left
- Played for: Buffalo Sabres; Los Angeles Kings
- NHL draft: 5th overall, 1971; Buffalo Sabres
- Playing career: 1971–1982

Richard Lionel Martin (/mɑːrˈtæn/; French: [maʁtɛ̃]; July 26, 1951 – March 13, 2011) was a Canadian professional ice hockey winger who played in the National Hockey League (NHL) with the Buffalo Sabres and Los Angeles Kings for 11 seasons between 1971 and 1982. He featured in the 1975 Stanley Cup Finals with the Sabres. He was most famous for playing on the Sabres' French Connection line with Gilbert Perreault and Rene Robert.

== Playing career ==
Martin was drafted fifth overall by the Buffalo Sabres in the 1971 NHL amateur draft after a junior career with the Montreal Junior Canadiens of the Ontario Hockey Association (OHA). He played 685 career NHL games, scoring 384 goals and 317 assists for 701 points. His best season was the 1974–75 season when he scored 52 goals and 95 points in only 68 games. Martin scored at least 44 goals five times in his NHL career. Martin was selected to play in seven consecutive All Star Games (1971–72 through 1977–78) and was selected as the official NHL All-Star first team left wing in 1973–74 and 1974–75 and the official NHL All-Star second team left wing in 1975–76 and 1976–77. Martin holds the Buffalo Sabres franchise career records for hat tricks, four-goal games, 40-goal seasons, consecutive 40-goal seasons, 50-goal seasons (tied with Danny Gare), consecutive 50-goal seasons. Martin is also #11 all-time in career goals per game average (.56) in NHL regular-season history.

Midway through the third period of the Sabres' 2–0 home win on February 9, 1978, Dave Farrish of the New York Rangers hooked Martin around the neck from behind and kicked Martin's feet out from under him, causing Martin to hit his head on the ice. He was knocked unconscious, and went into convulsions. After that play, helmets became a much more common sight on the heads of his Sabre teammates.

On November 8, 1980, Martin's career was dealt a devastating blow. In a game against the Washington Capitals at the Aud, Martin was racing in on a breakaway. Capitals forward Ryan Walter managed to trip Martin and no penalty was called. Capitals goalie Mike Palmateer, already way out of his crease, knocked Martin back down by kicking his knee, causing severe cartilage damage that kept him out of all but 11 games for the remainder of the season.

Martin underwent surgery in Toronto and on March 10, 1981, Scotty Bowman traded Martin and Don Luce to the Los Angeles Kings for a pair of draft picks, one of which the Sabres used to get goalie Tom Barrasso in 1983. Martin played four games for the Kings (one in 1980–81, three in 1981–82) before hanging up the skates in December 1981. He later said that his knee was almost completely ruined by the fall of 1981, and he feared being unable to walk if he kept playing. He blamed Bowman for pressing him to suit up in January 1981, saying it hindered his rehab.

In 1989 he, along with the other two members of the French Connection, were inducted into the Buffalo Sabres Hall of Fame. His #7 was retired along with René Robert's #14 on November 15, 1995, flanking the #11 of Gilbert Perreault under a French Connection banner. On Oct. 25, 2005, Martin was inducted into the Greater Buffalo Sports Hall of Fame. In 2010, in commemoration of the Sabres' 40th season, The Buffalo News ranked Martin fourth out of the top 40 Sabres of all time, while he was voted fifth by fans. After his death in 2011, the Sabres honored his memory by painting the number 7, the number Martin wore for most of his career with Buffalo, behind each goal at the HSBC Arena for the remainder of the 2010–11 season.

In 2012, a statue of "The French Connection" was unveiled in front of the Sabres' arena, today known as KeyBank Center.

== Achievements ==
Martin was selected to play in the NHL All-Star Game in seven consecutive seasons from 1972 to 1978. He was a 1st Team All-Star in 1974 and 1975 to go along with selections to the 2nd Team All-Star in 1976 and 1977. His 21 hat tricks is 14th all-time in NHL history (along with being a franchise record for Buffalo) and his 0.561 goals per game is 12th all-time. While he never won a Stanley Cup, he was part of the roster on Team Canada for their victorious 1976 Canada Cup run. Martin finished in the top ten for goals in five different seasons (1971-72, 1973-74, 1974-75, 1975-76, 1976-77), which most notably saw him finish 2nd in the 1973-74 season. Martin formerly held season franchise records for goals and goals per game. He still holds the record for most hat tricks by a Sabre with 21.

== Personal life ==
Martin and his wife, Mikey, were owners of Globalquest Solutions and Globalquest Staffing Solutions in Williamsville, New York. The couple had three children together, sons Cory, Josh, and Erick.

Martin owned a bar/restaurant called Slapshot on Niagara Falls Boulevard in Niagara Falls, New York.

Martin died on March 13, 2011, in Clarence, New York, from a heart attack while driving, a complication of hypertensive arteriosclerotic cardiovascular disease. He was 59 years old. Later analysis revealed that Martin had stage 2 chronic traumatic encephalopathy, a disease normally associated with enforcers; the damage was believed to stem from a severe concussion Martin sustained in 1978, and it had no effect on his cognitive abilities. Martin was the first non-enforcer to have been diagnosed with the disease, which can only be diagnosed posthumously.

== Career statistics ==
=== Regular season and playoffs ===
			Regular season					Playoffs
Season	Team	League	GP	G	A	Pts	PIM	GP	G	A	Pts	PIM
1967–68	Thetford Mines Canadiens	QJHL	40	38	35	73	—	7	2	0	2	4
1968–69	Montreal Junior Canadiens	OHA-Jr.	52	22	21	43	27	14	3	0	3	2
1968–69	Montreal Junior Canadiens	M-Cup	—	—	—	—	—	6	2	1	3	12
1969–70	Montreal Junior Canadiens	OHA-Jr.	34	23	32	55	10	16	14	20	34	12
1969–70	Montreal Junior Canadiens	M-Cup	—	—	—	—	—	12	14	13	27	8
1970–71	Montreal Junior Canadiens	OHA-Jr.	60	71	50	121	106	11	17	7	24	10
1971–72	Buffalo Sabres	NHL	73	44	30	74	39	—	—	—	—	—
1972–73	Buffalo Sabres	NHL	75	37	36	73	79	6	3	2	5	12
1973–74	Buffalo Sabres	NHL	78	52	34	86	38	—	—	—	—	—
1974–75	Buffalo Sabres	NHL	68	52	43	95	72	17	7	8	15	20
1975–76	Buffalo Sabres	NHL	80	49	37	86	67	9	4	7	11	12
1976–77	Buffalo Sabres	NHL	66	36	29	65	58	6	2	1	3	9
1977–78	Buffalo Sabres	NHL	65	28	35	63	16	7	2	4	6	13
1978–79	Buffalo Sabres	NHL	73	32	21	53	35	3	0	3	3	0
1979–80	Buffalo Sabres	NHL	80	45	34	79	54	14	6	4	10	8
1980–81	Buffalo Sabres	NHL	23	7	14	21	20	—	—	—	—	—
1980–81	Los Angeles Kings	NHL	1	1	1	2	0	1	0	0	0	0
1981–82	Los Angeles Kings	NHL	3	1	3	4	2	—	—	—	—	—
NHL totals			685	384	317	701	477	63	24	29	53	74

=== International ===
Year	Team	Event	GP	G	A	Pts	PIM
1976	Canada	CC	4	3	2	5	0

Preceded by Gilbert Perreault	Buffalo Sabres first-round draft pick 1971	Succeeded by Jim Schoenfeld
