= List of Buffalo Sabres players =

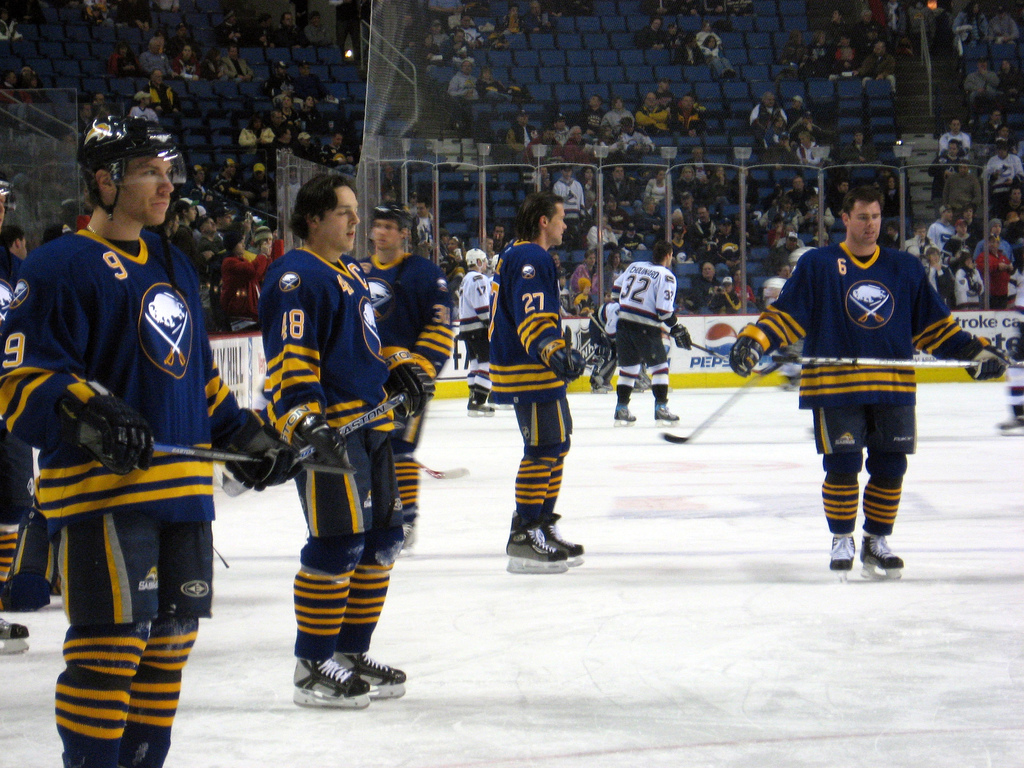
Several Sabres players during warm-up prior to a game.

The Buffalo Sabres are a professional ice hockey team based in Buffalo, New York, United States. The Sabres are members of the Atlantic Division of the Eastern Conference in the National Hockey League (NHL). The team was founded as an expansion franchise in 1970, and as of April 15, 2025, 60 goaltenders and 517 skaters (forwards and defensemen) have appeared in at least one regular season or playoff game with the Sabres.

Nine former Buffalo Sabres players are enshrined in the Hockey Hall of Fame: Dave Andreychuk, Dick Duff, Grant Fuhr, Clark Gillies, Dale Hawerchuk, Tim Horton, Pat LaFontaine, Dominik Hasek, and Gilbert Perreault. Dominik Hasek won two Hart Memorial Trophies as NHL MVP while playing for the Sabres. In addition, Hasek won six Vezina Trophies as the NHL's top goaltender while playing for Buffalo; Ryan Miller and Tom Barrasso have won the Vezina while playing for the Sabres, while Don Edwards and Bob Sauve shared the trophy as Sabres in the 1979–80 season. Barrasso also won the Calder Memorial Trophy as NHL rookie of the year while playing for the Sabres, as did Gilbert Perreault and Tyler Myers. Michael Peca won the Frank J. Selke Trophy while with the team.

== Key ==
Appeared in an Sabres game during the 2025–26 NHL season or is still part of the organization.
retired jersey or elected to the Hockey Hall of Fame

Abbreviations
| Nat | Nationality |
| GP | Games played |
| SC | Stanley Cup winner |
| HHOF | Hockey Hall of Fame inductee |

Goaltenders
| W | Wins | SO | Shutouts |
| L | Losses | GAA | Goals against average |
| T | Ties | SV% | Save percentage |
| OTL | Overtime loss | | |

Skaters
| Pos | Position | RW | Right wing | A | Assists |
| D | Defenceman | C | Centre | P | Points |
| LW | Left wing | G | Goals | PIM | Penalty minutes |

* - Save percentage did not become an official NHL statistic until the 1982–83 season. Therefore, goaltenders who played before 1982 do not have official save percentages.

The "Seasons" column lists the first year of the season of the player's first game and the last year of the season of the player's last game. For example, a player who played one game in the 2000–01 season would be listed as playing with the team from 2000–2001, regardless of what calendar year the game occurred within.

Statistics complete as of the 2025–26 NHL season.

== Goaltenders ==
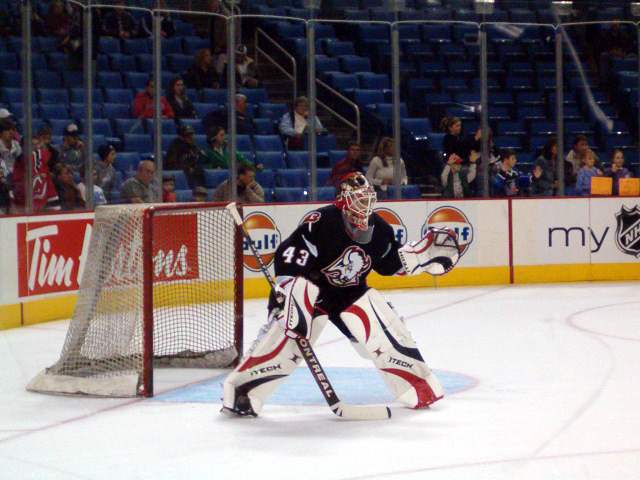
Martin Biron played for the Sabres for nine seasons.

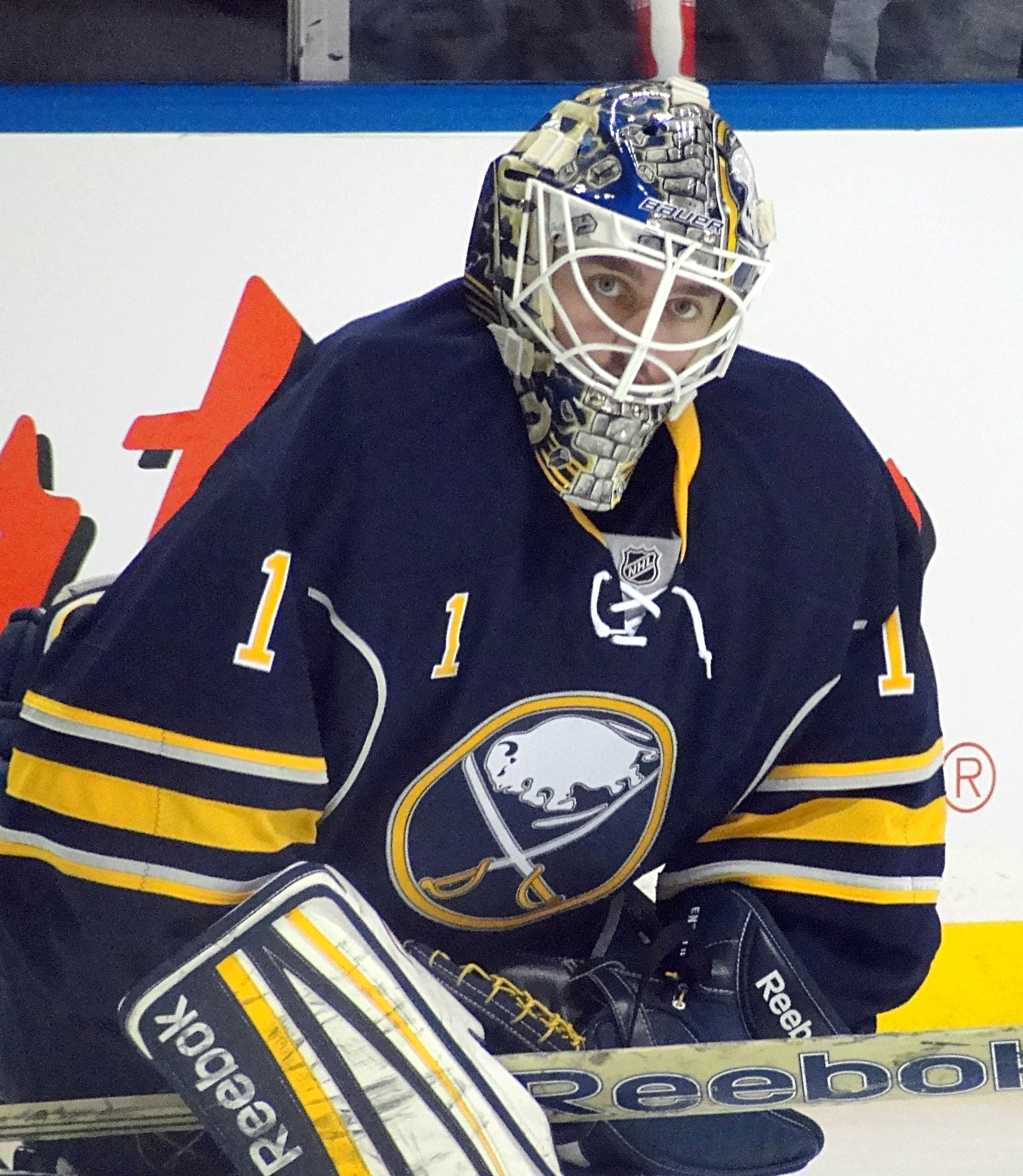
Jhonas Enroth played 118 games with the Sabres between 2009 and 2015.

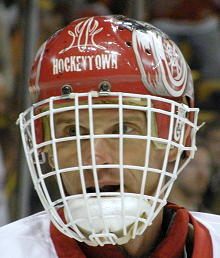
Dominik Hasek, shown here as a member of the Detroit Red Wings, won six Vezina Trophies and two Hart Trophies while with the Sabres.

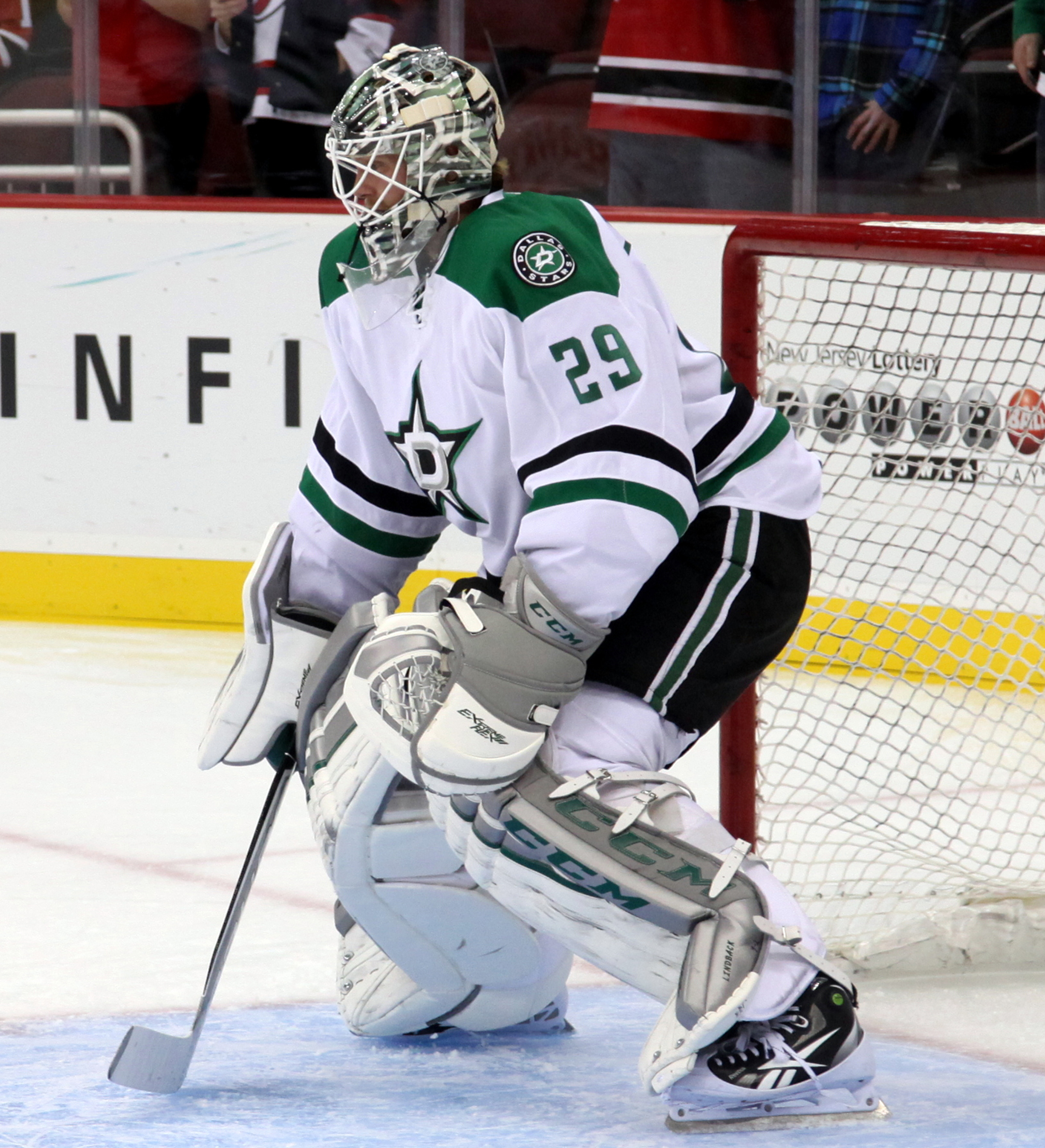
Anders Lindback, shown here as a member of the Dallas Stars, was acquired by the Sabres late in the 2014–15 season.

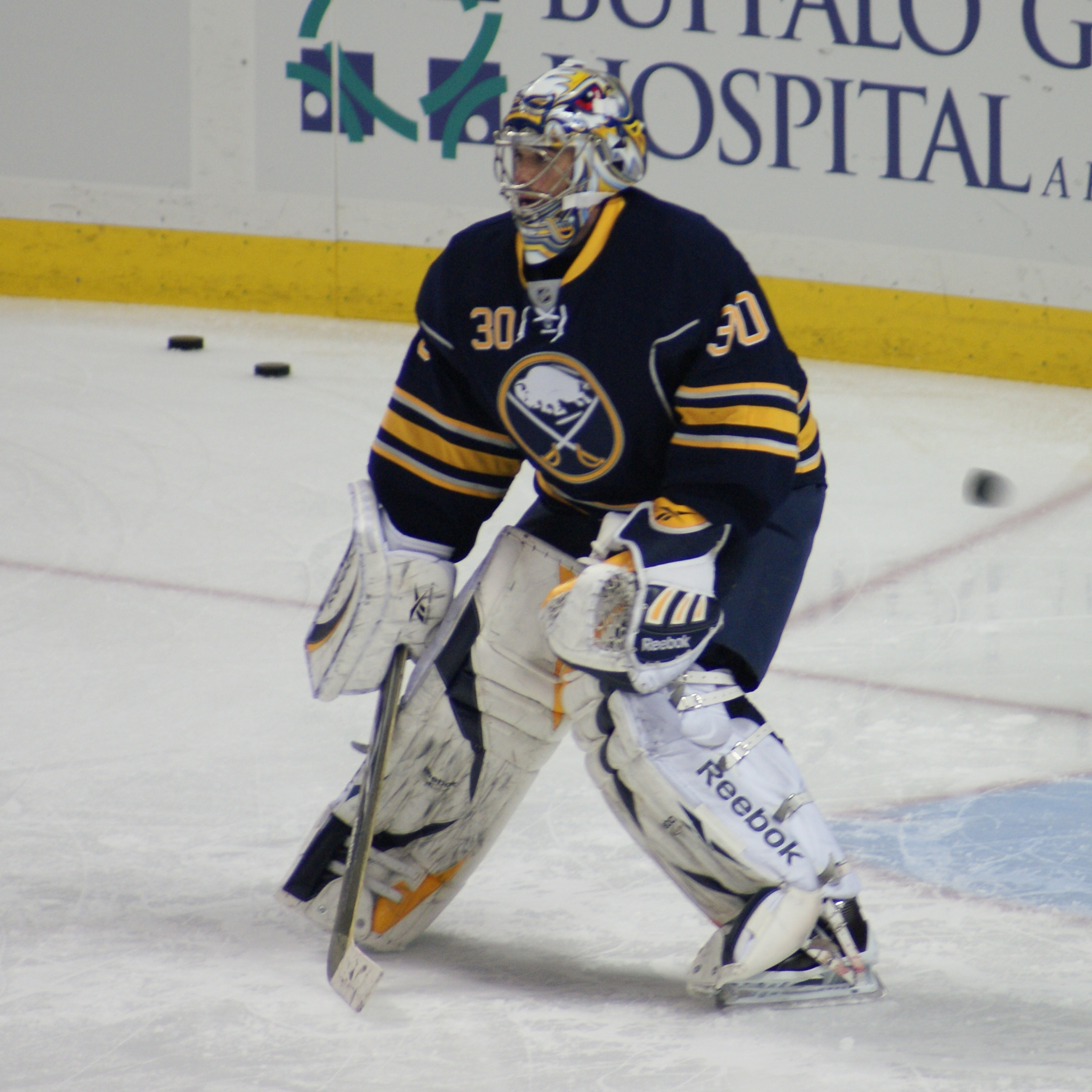
Ryan Miller played for the Sabres between 2002 and 2014, winning a team-record 269 games.

Goaltenders
| Name | Nat | Seasons | Regular-season | | | | | | | | Playoffs | | | | | | Notes |
| Name | Nat | Seasons | GP | W | L | T | OTL | SO | GAA | SV% | GP | W | L | SO | GAA | SV% | Notes |
|---|---|---|---|---|---|---|---|---|---|---|---|---|---|---|---|---|---|
| Anderson, Craig | (United States) | 2021–2023 | 57 | 28 | 23 | — | 4 | 1 | 3.09 | .902 | — | — | — | — | — | — | |
| Barrasso, Tom | (United States) | 1983–1989 | 266 | 124 | 102 | 28 | — | 13 | 3.28 | .884 | 12 | 3 | 8 | 0 | 4.23 | .861 | |
| Biron, Martin | (Canada) | 1995–1996; 1998–2007 | 300 | 134 | 115 | 25 | 4 | 18 | 2.62 | .909 | — | — | — | — | — | — | |
| Blue, John | (United States) | 1995–1996 | 5 | 2 | 0 | 0 | — | 0 | 3.53 | .891 | — | — | — | — | — | — | |
| Bromley, Gary | (Canada) | 1973–1976 | 63 | 29 | 17 | 14 | — | 4 | 3.20 | — | — | — | — | — | — | — | |
| Cloutier, Jacques | (Canada) | 1981–1983; 1984–1989 | 144 | 50 | 58 | 15 | — | 1 | 3.70 | — | 4 | 1 | 3 | 0 | 2.52 | .907 | |
| Comrie, Eric | (Canada) | 2022–2024 | 29 | 11 | 16 | — | 1 | 1 | 3.68 | .882 | — | — | — | — | — | — | |
| Conklin, Ty | (United States) | 2006–2007 | 5 | 1 | 2 | — | 0 | 0 | 3.43 | .892 | — | — | — | — | — | — | |
| Crozier, Roger | (Canada) | 1970–1976 | 202 | 74 | 76 | 29 | — | 10 | 3.23 | — | 9 | 5 | 4 | 0 | 2.77 | — | |
| Daley, Joe | (Canada) | 1970–1971 | 38 | 12 | 16 | 8 | — | 1 | 3.70 | — | — | — | — | — | — | — | |
| Dell, Aaron | (Canada) | 2021–2022 | 12 | 1 | 8 | — | 1 | 0 | 4.03 | .893 | — | — | — | — | — | — | |
| Desjardins, Gerry | (Canada) | 1974–1978 | 116 | 66 | 30 | 18 | — | 5 | 2.81 | — | 25 | 11 | 11 | 0 | 3.25 | — | |
| Draper, Tom | (Canada) | 1991–1993 | 37 | 15 | 15 | 5 | — | 1 | 3.37 | .890 | 7 | 3 | 4 | 1 | 2.63 | .905 | |
| Dryden, Dave | (Canada) | 1970–1974 | 120 | 43 | 45 | 20 | — | 5 | 3.06 | — | 2 | 2 | 0 | 0 | 4.50 | — | |
| Edwards, Don | (Canada) | 1976–1982 | 307 | 156 | 83 | 61 | — | 14 | 3.00 | — | 31 | 13 | 18 | 1 | 3.16 | — | |
| Eliot, Darren | (Canada) | 1988–1989 | 2 | 0 | 0 | 0 | — | 0 | 6.27 | .837 | — | — | — | — | — | — | |
| Ellis, Colten | (Canada) | 2025–2026 | 16 | 8 | 4 | — | 2 | 1 | 2.90 | .903 | — | — | — | — | — | — | |
| Enroth, Jhonas | (Sweden) | 2009–2015 | 118 | 38 | 38 | — | 14 | 4 | 3.04 | .908 | 1 | 0 | 0 | 0 | 3.49 | .879 | |
| Essensa, Bob | (Canada) | 2001–2002 | 9 | 0 | 5 | 0 | — | 0 | 2.91 | .850 | — | — | — | — | — | — | |
| Farr, Norm "Rocky" | (Canada) | 1972–1975 | 19 | 2 | 6 | 3 | — | 0 | 3.49 | — | — | — | — | — | — | — | |
| Fuhr, Grant | (Canada) | 1992–1995 | 64 | 25 | 29 | 5 | — | 2 | 3.60 | .886 | 8 | 3 | 4 | 0 | 3.42 | .875 | HHOF 2003 |
| Hackett, Matt | (Canada) | 2013–2015 | 13 | 1 | 10 | — | 2 | 0 | 3.71 | .871 | — | — | — | — | — | — | |
| Harrison, Paul | (Canada) | 1981–1982 | 6 | 2 | 1 | 1 | — | 0 | 3.67 | — | 1 | 0 | 0 | 0 | 2.31 | — | |
| Hasek, Dominik | (Czech Republic) | 1992–2001 | 491 | 234 | 170 | 60 | — | 55 | 2.22 | .926 | 68 | 37 | 30 | 6 | 2.04 | .930 | HHOF 2014; Ret #39 |
| Houser, Michael | (United States) | 2020–2022 | 6 | 4 | 2 | — | 0 | 0 | 2.97 | .917 | — | — | — | — | — | — | |
| Hutton, Carter | (Canada) | 2018–2021 | 94 | 31 | 49 | — | 10 | 2 | 3.12 | .902 | — | — | — | — | — | — | |
| Johansson, Jonas | (Sweden) | 2019–2021 | 20 | 5 | 9 | — | 3 | 1 | 2.99 | .894 | — | — | — | — | — | — | |
| Johnson, Chad | (Canada) | 2015–2016; 2017–2018 | 81 | 32 | 33 | — | 7 | 1 | 2.85 | .907 | — | — | — | — | — | — | |
| Ireland, Randy | (Canada) | 1978–1979 | 2 | 0 | 0 | 0 | — | 0 | 6.00 | — | — | — | — | — | — | — | |
| Kasdorf, Jason | (Canada) | 2015–2016 | 1 | 0 | 1 | — | 0 | 0 | 4.00 | .867 | — | — | — | — | — | — | |
| Knapp, Connor | (United States) | 2013–2014 | 2 | 0 | 0 | — | 1 | 0 | 3.12 | .875 | — | — | — | — | — | — | |
| Lalime, Patrick | (Canada) | 2008–2011 | 47 | 9 | 26 | — | 5 | 0 | 2.98 | .901 | — | — | — | — | — | — | |
| Lehner, Robin | (Sweden) | 2015–2018 | 133 | 42 | 61 | — | 22 | 6 | 2.77 | .916 | — | — | — | — | — | — | |
| Levi, Devon | (Canada) | 2022–2025 | 39 | 17 | 17 | — | 2 | 0 | 3.29 | .894 | — | — | — | — | — | — | |
| Lieuwen, Nathan | (Canada) | 2013–2014 | 7 | 1 | 4 | — | 0 | 0 | 2.98 | .906 | — | — | — | — | — | — | |
| Lindback, Anders | (Sweden) | 2014–2015 | 16 | 4 | 8 | — | 2 | 0 | 2.76 | .924 | — | — | — | — | — | — | |
| Littman, David | (United States) | 1990–1992 | 2 | 0 | 1 | 0 | — | 0 | 4.38 | .851 | — | — | — | — | — | — | |
| Luukkonen, Ukko-Pekka | (Finland) | 2020–2026 | 190 | 93 | 74 | — | 18 | 8 | 2.96 | .900 | 6 | 3 | 3 | 0 | 3.18 | .876 | |
| Lyon, Alex | (United States) | 2025–2026 | 36 | 20 | 10 | — | 4 | 3 | 2.77 | .906 | 10 | 4 | 3 | 0 | 2.59 | .904 | |
| MacIntyre, Drew | (Canada) | 2011–2012 | 2 | 0 | 0 | — | 0 | 0 | 1.38 | .944 | — | — | — | — | — | — | |
| Makarov, Andrey | (Russia) | 2014–2015 | 1 | 0 | 1 | — | 0 | 0 | 3.00 | .917 | — | — | — | — | — | — | |
| Malarchuk, Clint | (Canada) | 1988–1992 | 102 | 39 | 39 | 16 | — | 2 | 3.40 | .904 | 5 | 2 | 3 | 0 | 4.33 | .851 | |
| Miller, Ryan | (United States) | 2002–2013 | 500 | 269 | 164 | 1 | 53 | 28 | 2.59 | .915 | 47 | 25 | 22 | 3 | 2.47 | .917 | Ret #30 |
| Myre, Phil | (Canada) | 1982–1983 | 5 | 3 | 2 | 0 | — | 0 | 4.20 | .861 | 1 | 0 | 0 | 0 | 7.37 | — | |
| Nilsson, Anders | (Sweden) | 2016–2017 | 26 | 10 | 10 | — | 4 | 0 | 2.67 | .923 | — | — | — | — | — | — | |
| Noronen, Mika | (Finland) | 2000–2006 | 67 | 22 | 31 | 6 | 0 | 3 | 2.64 | .902 | — | — | — | — | — | — | |
| Puppa, Daren | (Canada) | 1985–1993 | 215 | 93 | 68 | 28 | — | 5 | 3.47 | .898 | 11 | 3 | 6 | 0 | 3.64 | .894 | |
| Reimer, James | (Canada) | 2024–2025 | 22 | 10 | 8 | — | 2 | 1 | 2.90 | .899 | — | — | — | — | — | — | |
| Roloson, Dwayne | (Canada) | 1998–2000 | 32 | 7 | 15 | 5 | — | 1 | 2.87 | .909 | 4 | 1 | 1 | 0 | 4.32 | .851 | |
| Sauve, Bob | (Canada) | 1976–1985 | 246 | 119 | 76 | 39 | — | 7 | 3.21 | — | 23 | 13 | 9 | 4 | 2.79 | — | |
| Shields, Steve | (Canada) | 1995–1998 | 31 | 7 | 14 | 6 | — | 0 | 2.91 | .913 | 10 | 4 | 6 | 1 | 2.74 | .922 | |
| Skudra, Peter | (Latvia) | 2000–2001 | 1 | 0 | 0 | 0 | — | 0 | 0.00 | n/a | — | — | — | — | — | — | |
| Smith, Al | (Canada) | 1975–1977 | 21 | 9 | 6 | 2 | — | 0 | 3.37 | — | 1 | 0 | 0 | 0 | 3.53 | — | |
| Stauber, Robb | (United States) | 1994–1995 | 6 | 2 | 3 | 0 | — | 0 | 3.79 | .867 | — | — | — | — | — | — | |
| Subban, Malcolm | (Canada) | 2021–2022 | 4 | 0 | 2 | — | 1 | 0 | 4.85 | .871 | — | — | — | — | — | — | |
| Tellqvist, Mikael | (Sweden) | 2008–2009 | 6 | 2 | 1 | — | 0 | 0 | 2.35 | .928 | — | — | — | — | — | — | |
| Thibault, Jocelyn | (Canada) | 2007–2008 | 12 | 3 | 4 | — | 2 | 2 | 3.31 | .869 | — | — | — | — | — | — | |
| Tokarski, Dustin | (Canada) | 2020–2022 | 42 | 12 | 20 | — | 7 | 1 | 3.35 | .901 | — | — | — | — | — | — | |
| Trefilov, Andrei | (Russia) | 1995–1997 | 25 | 8 | 10 | 1 | — | 0 | 3.54 | .902 | 1 | 0 | 0 | 0 | 0.00 | 1.000 | |
| Ullmark, Linus | (Sweden) | 2015–2021 | 117 | 50 | 47 | — | 13 | 3 | 2.78 | .912 | — | — | — | — | — | — | |
| Wakaluk, Darcy | (Canada) | 1988–1989; 1990–1991 | 22 | 5 | 8 | 3 | — | 0 | 3.55 | .869 | 2 | 0 | 1 | 0 | 3.24 | .909 | |
| Wilcox, Adam | (United States) | 2017–2018 | 1 | 0 | 0 | — | 0 | 0 | 0.00 | 1.000 | — | — | — | — | — | — | |

== Skaters ==
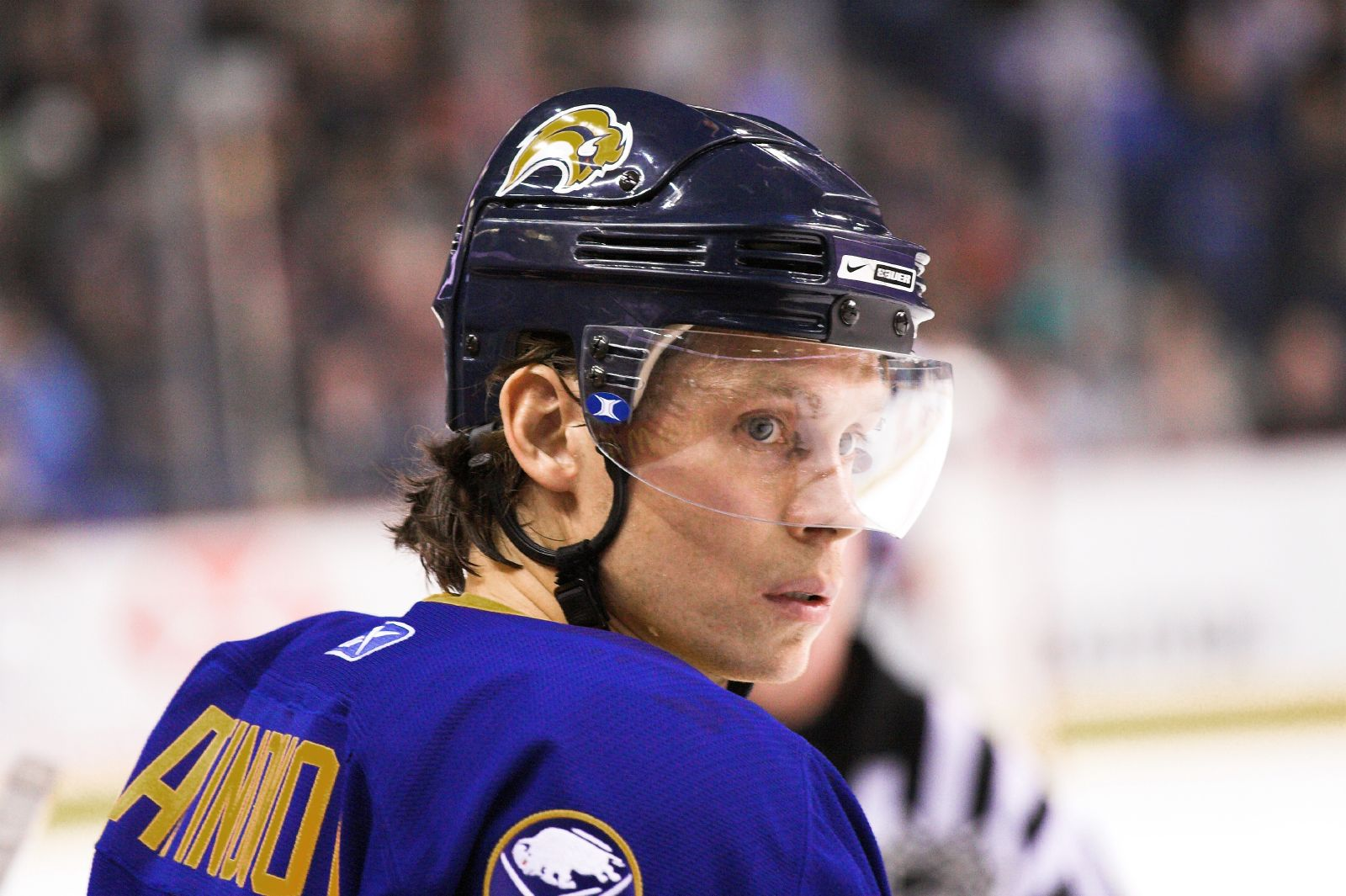
Maxim Afinogenov led the Sabres in scoring in 2005–06 with 73 points.

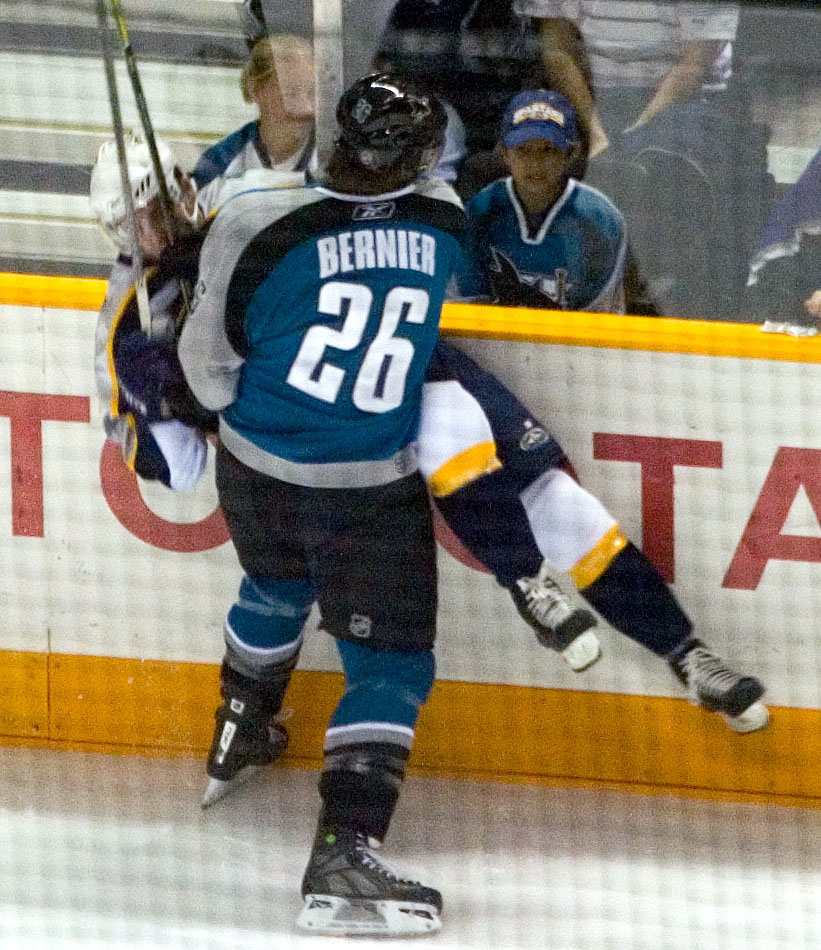
Steve Bernier, shown here playing for the San Jose Sharks, was acquired by the Sabres in 2008 in a trade which sent Brian Campbell to San Jose.

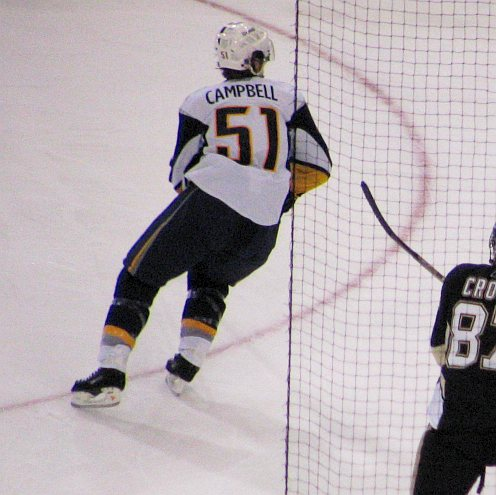
Brian Campbell was elected to the 2007 NHL All-Star Game as a starting defenceman.

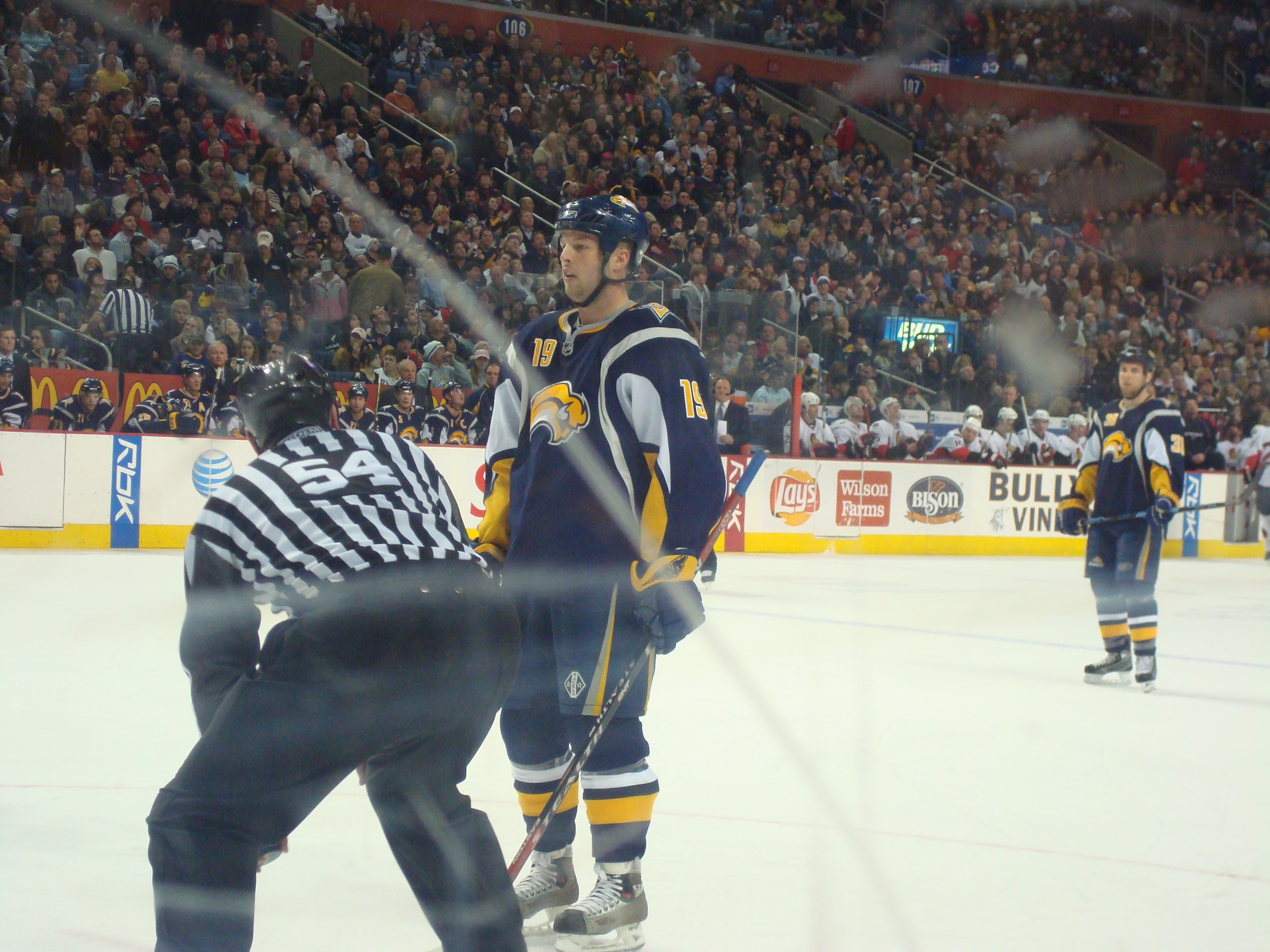
Tim Connolly was acquired by the Sabres along with Taylor Pyatt in exchange for Michael Peca.

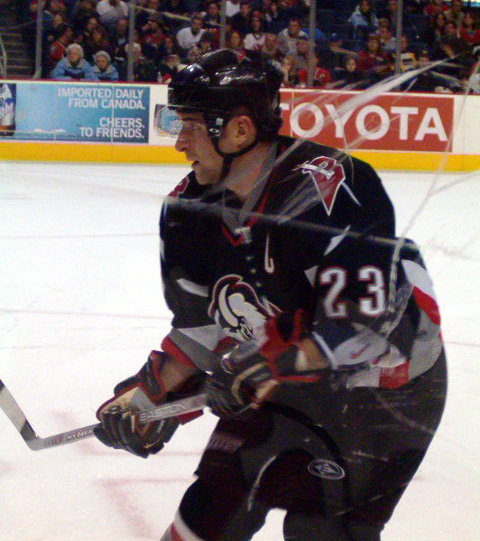
Chris Drury scored a career-high 37 goals while playing for the Sabres in the 2006–07 season.

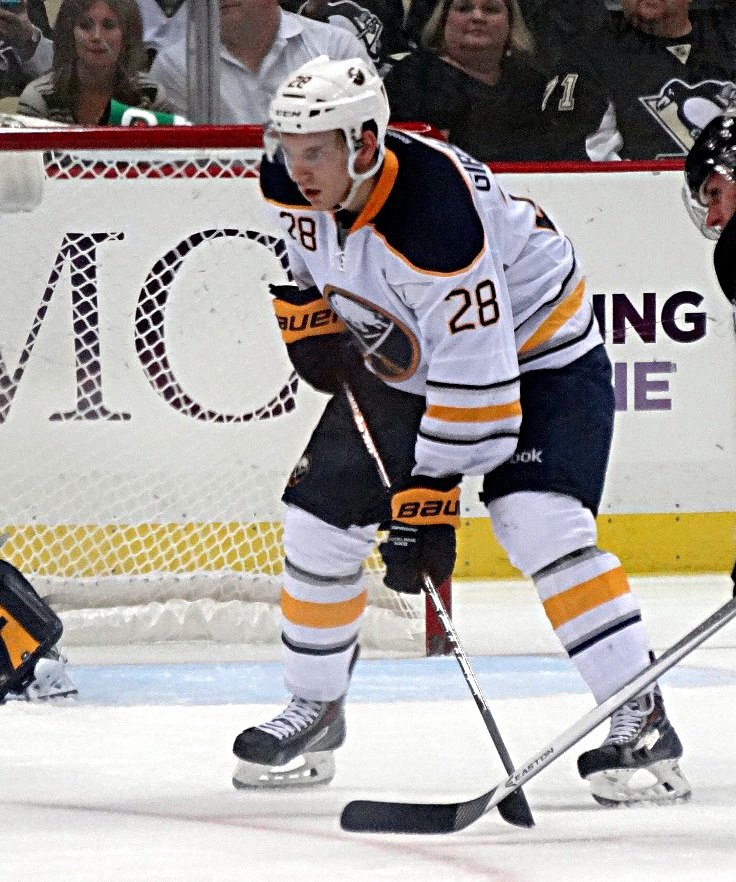
Zemgus Girgensons was the top vote-getter for the 2015 NHL All-Star Game.

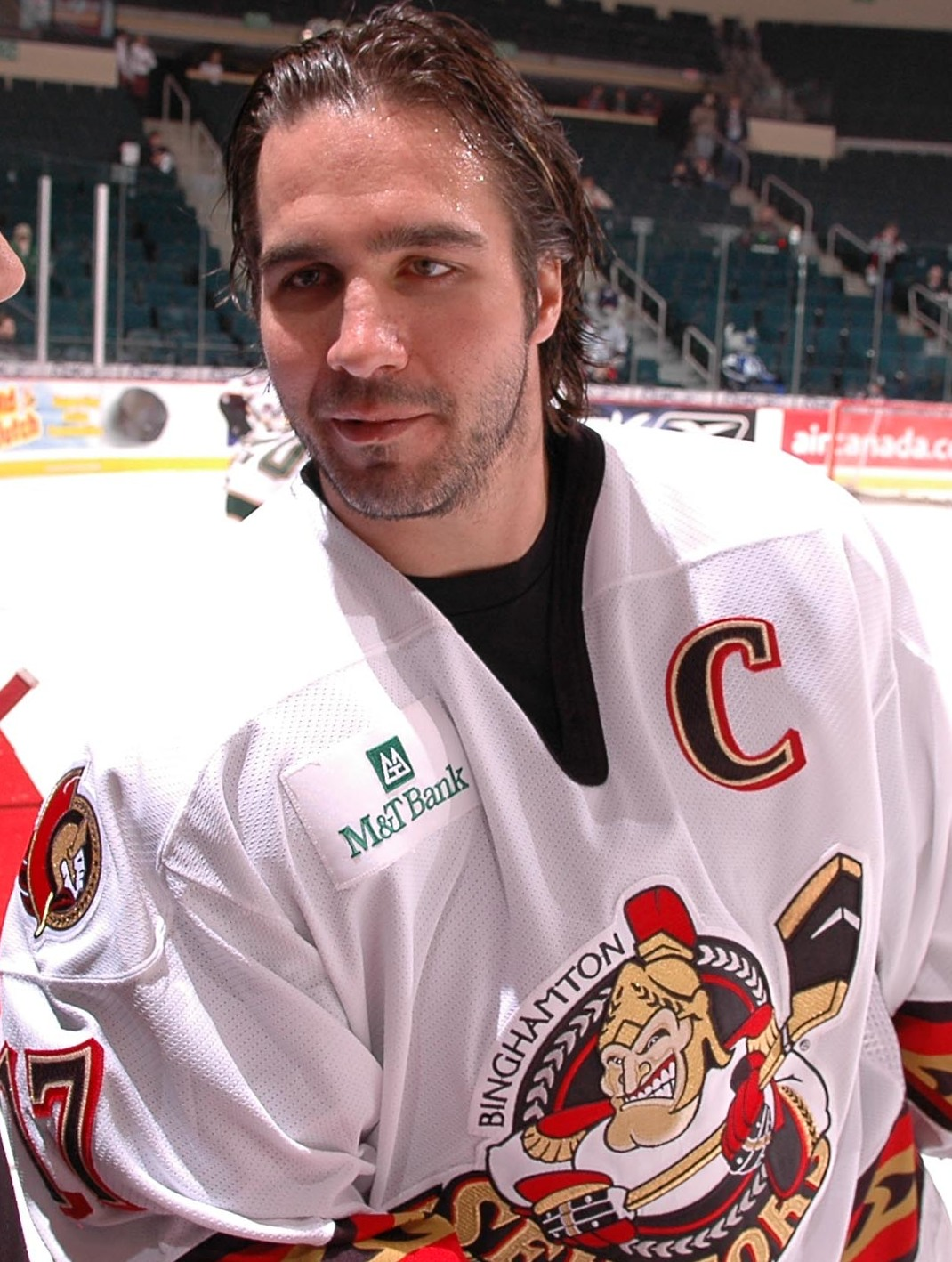
Denis Hamel, shown here as a member of the AHL's Binghamton Senators, spent parts of four seasons with the Sabres.

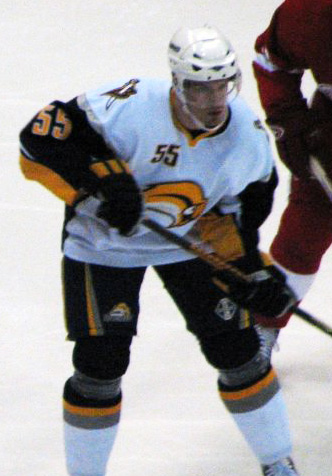
Jochen Hecht played for the Sabres from 2002 until 2013.

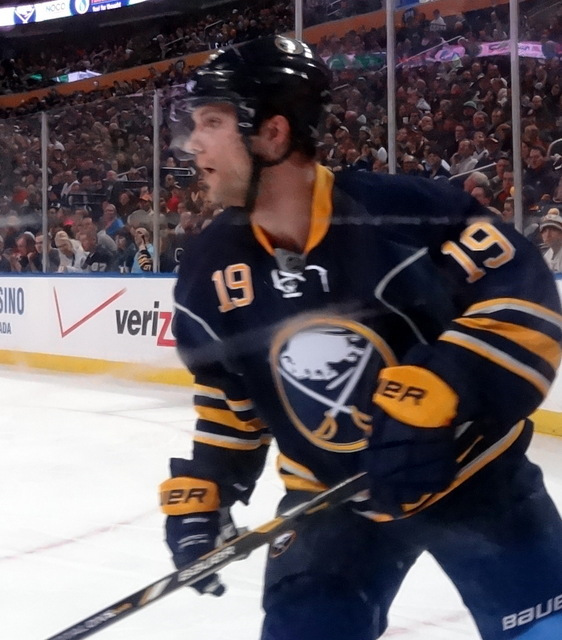
Cody Hodgson was acquired by the Sabres during the 2011–12 season.

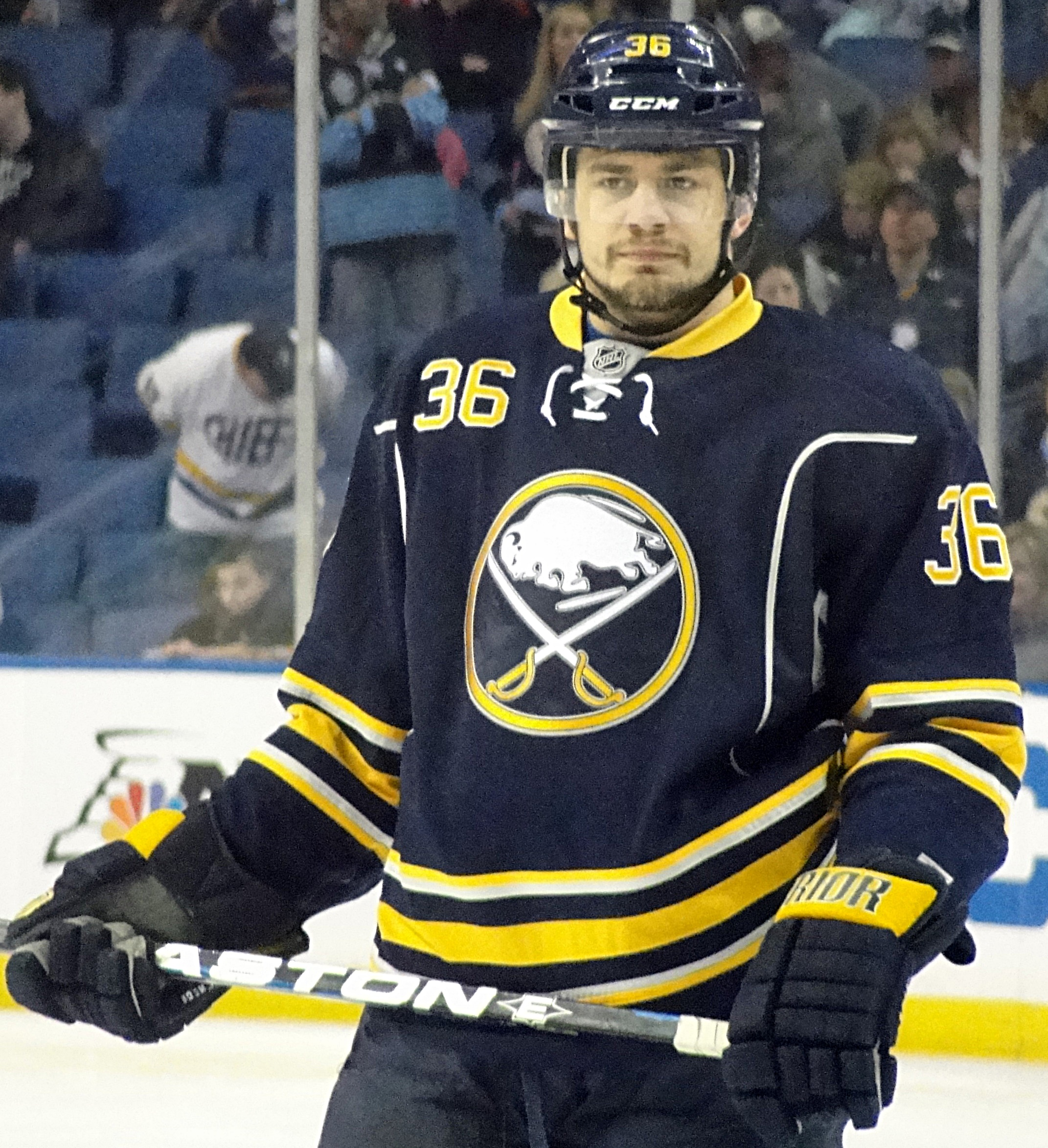
Patrick Kaleta, a Buffalo-area native, was drafted by the Sabres in the sixth round of the 2004 NHL entry draft.

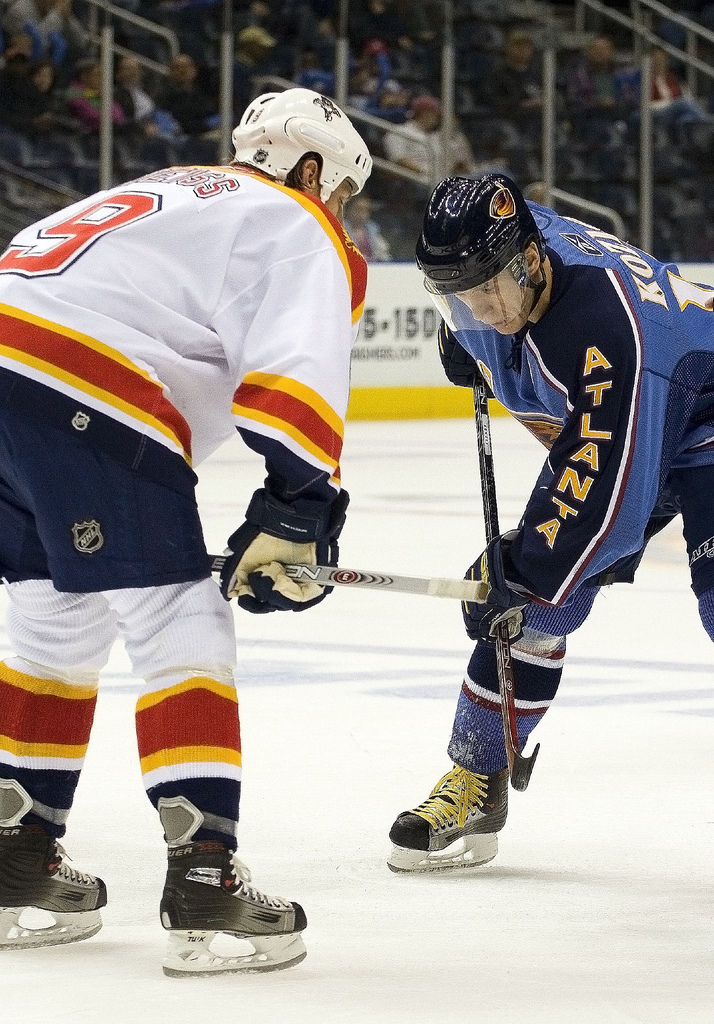
Vyacheslav Kozlov (right), shown here playing for the Atlanta Thrashers, was acquired by the Sabres in the trade which sent Dominik Hasek to Detroit.

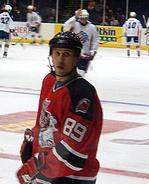
Alexander Mogilny, shown here as a member of the AHL's Albany River Rats, holds the Sabre record for goals in a season: 76 in 1992–93.

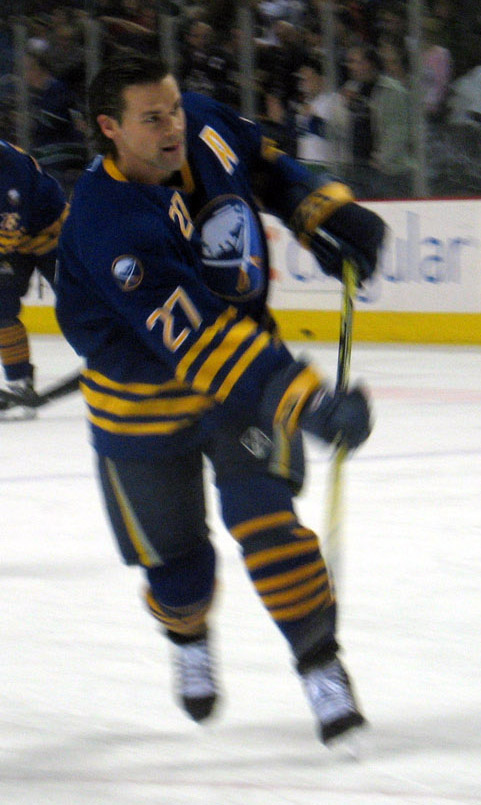
Teppo Numminen was signed by the Sabres as a free agent after playing 16 seasons with Winnipeg, Phoenix and Dallas.

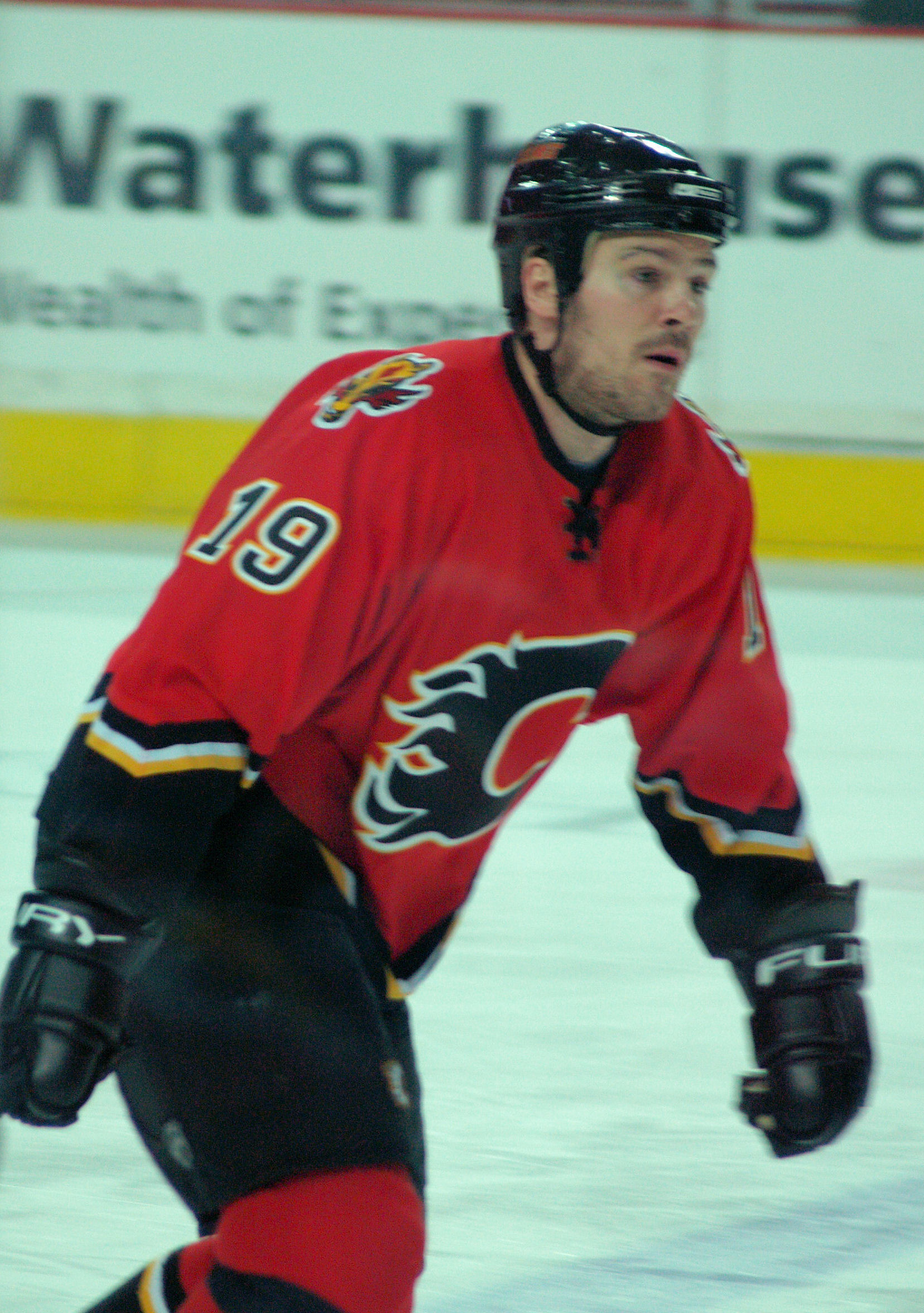
Wayne Primeau, shown here playing for the Calgary Flames, was part of the Sabre team which advanced to the Stanley Cup Finals in 1999.

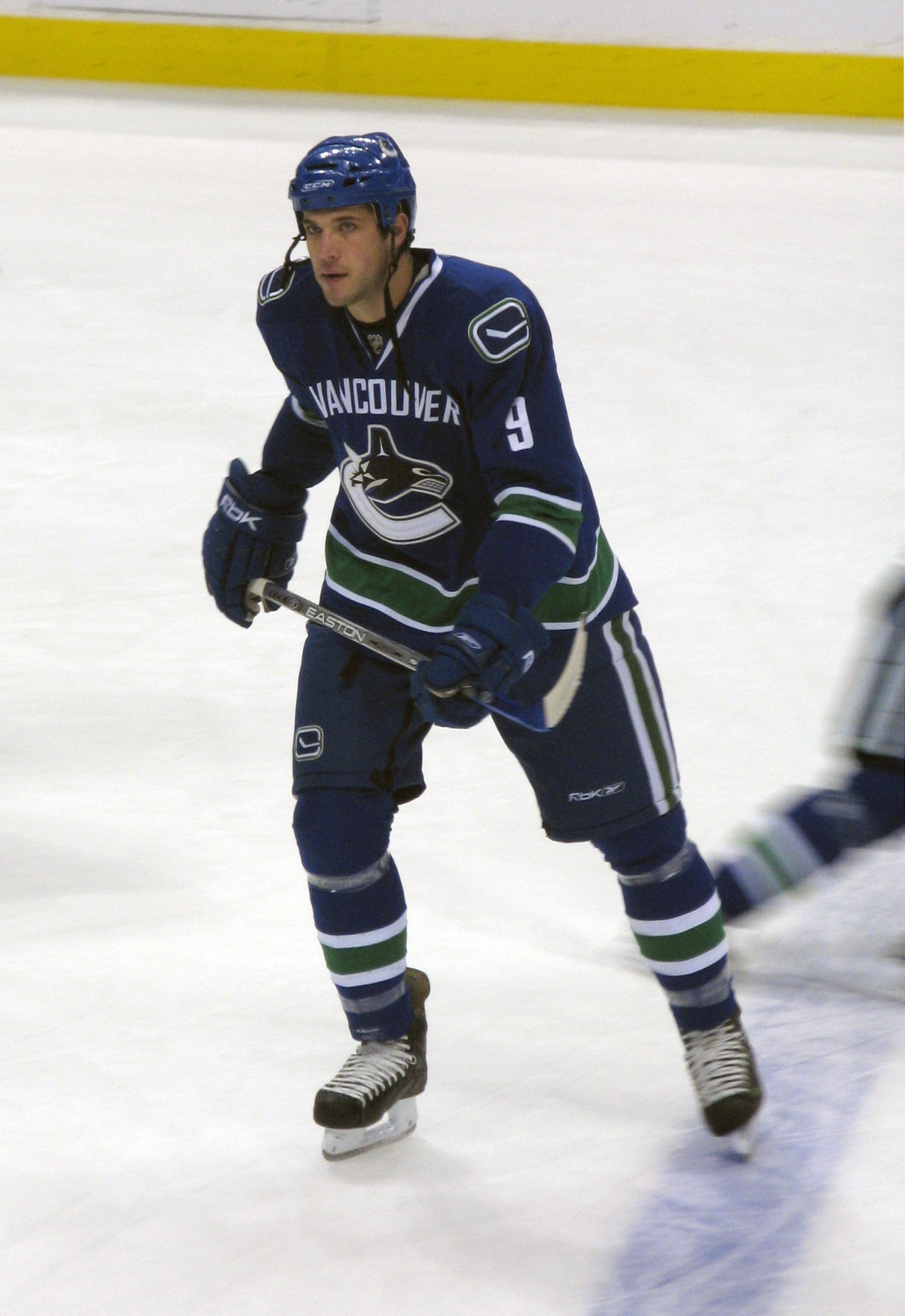
Taylor Pyatt, shown here playing for the Vancouver Canucks, was acquired by the Sabres along with Tim Connolly in exchange for Michael Peca.

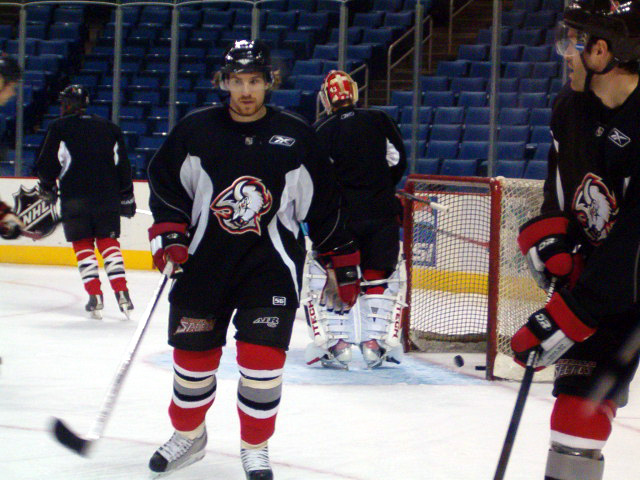
Derek Roy was one of three second-round draft picks made by the Sabres in 2001.

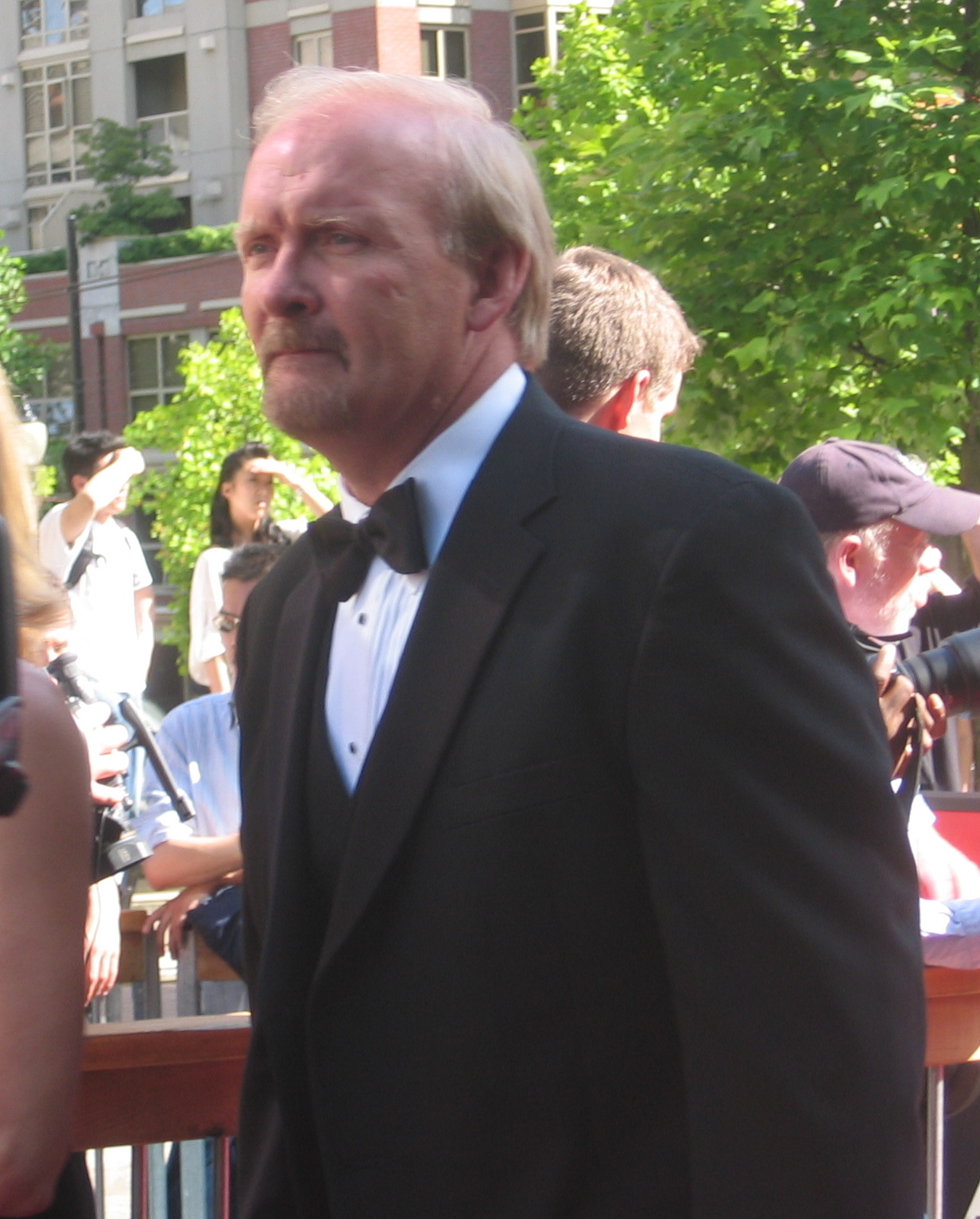
Lindy Ruff, who played for the Sabres from 1979 to 1989, served as the team's head coach from 1997 until 2013.

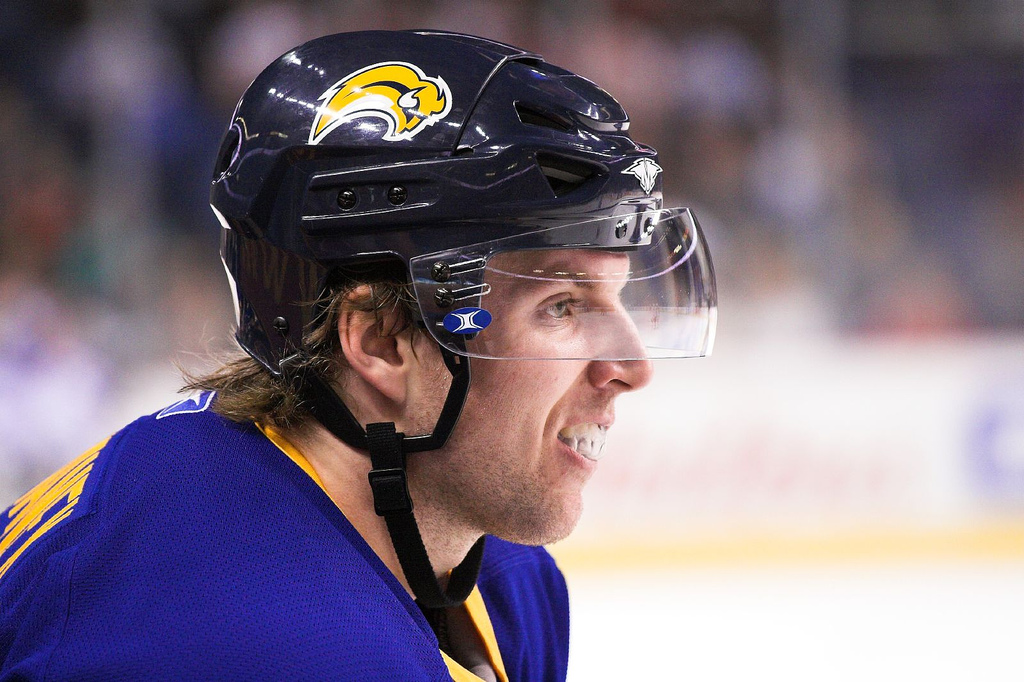
Thomas Vanek scored 43 goals for the Sabres in 2006–07, just his second NHL season.

Skaters
| Name | Nat | Pos | Seasons | Regular-season | | | | | Playoffs | | | | | Notes |
| Name | Nat | Pos | Seasons | GP | G | A | P | PIM | GP | G | A | P | PIM | Notes |
|---|---|---|---|---|---|---|---|---|---|---|---|---|---|---|
| Adam, Luke | (Canada) | LW | 2010–2014 | 87 | 15 | 11 | 26 | 32 | — | — | — | — | — | |
| Afinogenov, Maxim | (Russia) | RW | 1999–2009 | 569 | 134 | 200 | 334 | 440 | 49 | 10 | 13 | 23 | 22 | |
| Ambroziak, Peter | (Canada) | W | 1994–1995 | 12 | 0 | 1 | 1 | 0 | — | — | — | — | — | |
| Anderson, Ron | (Canada) | RW | 1970–1972 | 111 | 14 | 16 | 30 | 63 | — | — | — | — | — | |
| Anderson, Shawn | (Canada) | D | 1986–1990 | 113 | 6 | 26 | 32 | 66 | 5 | 0 | 1 | 1 | 4 | |
| Andersson, Mikael | (Sweden) | RW | 1985–1989 | 99 | 4 | 33 | 37 | 18 | 1 | 1 | 0 | 1 | 0 | |
| Andrea, Paul | (Canada) | RW | 1970–1971 | 47 | 11 | 21 | 32 | 4 | — | — | — | — | — | |
| Andreychuk, Dave | (Canada) | LW | 1982–1993; 2000–2001 | 837 | 368 | 436 | 804 | 596 | 54 | 13 | 22 | 35 | 36 | HHOF 2017 |
| Antipin, Viktor | (Russia) | D | 2017–2018 | 47 | 0 | 10 | 10 | 18 | — | — | — | — | — | |
| Armia, Joel | (Finland) | F | 2014–2015 | 1 | 0 | 0 | 0 | 0 | — | — | — | — | — | |
| Arniel, Scott | (Canada) | LW | 1986–1990 | 295 | 64 | 74 | 138 | 243 | 16 | 2 | 1 | 3 | 13 | |
| Asplund, Rasmus | (Sweden) | C | 2019–2023 | 164 | 18 | 31 | 49 | 16 | — | — | — | — | — | |
| Astley, Mark | (Canada) | D | 1993–1996 | 75 | 4 | 19 | 23 | 92 | 2 | 0 | 0 | 0 | 0 | |
| Atkinson, Steve | (Canada) | RW | 1970–1974 | 255 | 49 | 47 | 96 | 96 | 1 | 0 | 0 | 0 | 0 | |
| Aubé-Kubel, Nicolas | (Canada) | RW | 2024–2025 | 19 | 1 | 1 | 2 | 17 | — | — | — | — | — | |
| Audette, Donald | (Canada) | RW | 1989–1998; 2000–2001 | 421 | 166 | 131 | 297 | 335 | 61 | 15 | 23 | 38 | 36 | |
| Austin, Brady | (Canada) | D | 2016–2017 | 5 | 0 | 0 | 0 | 4 | — | — | — | — | — | |
| Ball, Terry | (Canada) | D | 1970–1972 | 12 | 0 | 1 | 1 | 6 | — | — | — | — | — | |
| Bailey, Justin | (United States) | RW | 2016–2018 | 52 | 5 | 3 | 8 | 8 | — | — | — | — | — | |
| Baptiste, Nicholas | (Canada) | RW | 2016–2018 | 47 | 7 | 3 | 10 | 20 | — | — | — | — | — | |
| Barnaby, Matthew | (Canada) | RW | 1992–1999 | 317 | 47 | 79 | 126 | 1248 | 27 | 7 | 11 | 18 | 79 | |
| Barnes, Stu | (Canada) | C | 1998–2003 | 310 | 67 | 105 | 172 | 98 | 39 | 14 | 7 | 21 | 10 | |
| Barrie, Doug | (Canada) | D | 1970–1972 | 102 | 6 | 28 | 34 | 213 | — | — | — | — | — | |
| Bartovic, Milan | (Slovakia) | W | 2002–2004 | 26 | 2 | 8 | 10 | 18 | — | — | — | — | — | |
| Beaulieu, Nathan | (Canada) | D | 2017–2019 | 89 | 4 | 12 | 16 | 68 | — | — | — | — | — | |
| Berglund, Patrik | (Sweden) | C | 2018–2019 | 23 | 2 | 2 | 4 | 6 | — | — | — | — | — | |
| Benoit, Andre | (Canada) | D | 2014–2015 | 59 | 1 | 8 | 9 | 20 | — | — | — | — | — | |
| Benson, Zach | (Canada) | LW | 2023–2026 | 211 | 34 | 67 | 101 | 138 | 13 | 5 | 4 | 9 | 64 | |
| Bernard-Docker, Jacob | (Canada) | D | 2024–2025 | 15 | 1 | 3 | 4 | 13 | — | — | — | — | — | |
| Bernier, Steve | (Canada) | RW | 2007–2008 | 17 | 3 | 6 | 9 | 2 | — | — | — | — | — | |
| Biro, Brandon | (Canada) | F | 2021–2024 | 6 | 2 | 0 | 2 | 0 | — | — | — | — | — | |
| Bjork, Anders | (United States) | LW | 2020–2023 | 74 | 8 | 6 | 14 | 14 | — | — | — | — | — | |
| Black, James | (Canada) | D | 1993–1994 | 2 | 0 | 0 | 0 | 0 | — | — | — | — | — | |
| Bodger, Doug | (Canada) | D | 1988–1996 | 479 | 54 | 233 | 287 | 506 | 42 | 6 | 18 | 24 | 25 | |
| Bogosian, Zach | (United States) | D | 2014–2020 | 243 | 13 | 54 | 67 | 234 | — | — | — | — | — | |
| Boland, Mike | (Canada) | D | 1978–1979 | 22 | 1 | 2 | 3 | 29 | 3 | 1 | 0 | 1 | 2 | |
| Borgen, William | (United States) | D | 2018–2021 | 14 | 0 | 0 | 0 | 4 | — | — | — | — | — | |
| Botterill, Jason | (Canada) | LW | 2002–2004 | 36 | 3 | 5 | 8 | 28 | — | — | — | — | — | |
| Boucher, Philippe | (Canada) | D | 1992–1995 | 65 | 7 | 16 | 23 | 43 | 7 | 1 | 1 | 2 | 2 | |
| Boughner, Bob | (Canada) | D | 1995–1998 | 177 | 2 | 11 | 13 | 494 | 25 | 0 | 5 | 5 | 24 | |
| Boulton, Eric | (Canada) | LW | 2000–2004 | 172 | 5 | 12 | 17 | 511 | — | — | — | — | — | |
| Boyes, Brad | (Canada) | RW | 2010–2012 | 86 | 13 | 24 | 37 | 12 | 7 | 1 | 0 | 1 | 0 | |
| Breitenbach, Ken | (Canada) | D | 1975–1977; 1978–1979 | 68 | 1 | 13 | 14 | 49 | 8 | 0 | 1 | 1 | 4 | |
| Brennan, T. J. | (United States) | D | 2011–2013 | 21 | 2 | 0 | 2 | 12 | — | — | — | — | — | |
| Briere, Daniel | (Canada) | C | 2002–2007 | 225 | 92 | 138 | 230 | 219 | 34 | 11 | 23 | 34 | 28 | |
| Brown, Brad | (Canada) | D | 2003–2004 | 13 | 0 | 2 | 2 | 12 | — | — | — | — | — | |
| Brown, Curtis | (Canada) | LW | 1994–2004 | 542 | 109 | 143 | 252 | 288 | 52 | 14 | 11 | 25 | 34 | |
| Brown, Greg | (United States) | D | 1990–1991; 1992–1993 | 49 | 1 | 3 | 4 | 41 | — | — | — | — | — | |
| Brydges, Paul | (Canada) | C | 1986–1987 | 15 | 2 | 2 | 4 | 6 | — | — | — | — | — | |
| Bryson, Jacob | (Canada) | D | 2020–2026 | 289 | 6 | 42 | 48 | 58 | — | — | — | — | — | |
| Burgdoerfer, Erik | (United States) | D | 2016–2017 | 2 | 0 | 0 | 0 | 0 | — | — | — | — | — | |
| Burridge, Randy | (Canada) | LW | 1995–1998 | 159 | 39 | 60 | 99 | 50 | 12 | 5 | 1 | 6 | 2 | |
| Busniuk, Ron | (Canada) | C | 1972–1974 | 6 | 0 | 3 | 3 | 13 | — | — | — | — | — | |
| Butcher, Will | (United States) | D | 2021–2022 | 37 | 2 | 6 | 8 | 0 | — | — | — | — | — | |
| Butler, Chris | (United States) | D | 2008–2011 | 155 | 5 | 31 | 36 | 66 | 7 | 0 | 1 | 1 | 10 | |
| Byers, Mike | (Canada) | RW | 1971–1972 | 46 | 9 | 7 | 16 | 12 | — | — | — | — | — | |
| Byram, Bowen | (Canada) | D | 2023–2026 | 182 | 21 | 68 | 89 | 107 | 13 | 4 | 3 | 7 | 12 | |
| Byron, Paul | (Canada) | C | 2010–2011 | 8 | 1 | 1 | 2 | 2 | — | — | — | — | — | |
| Caggiula, Drake | (Canada) | LW | 2020–2022 | 29 | 4 | 4 | 8 | 8 | — | — | — | — | — | |
| Campbell, Brian | (Canada) | D | 1999–2008 | 391 | 32 | 144 | 176 | 113 | 34 | 3 | 10 | 13 | 26 | |
| Card, Mike | (Canada) | D | 2006–2007 | 4 | 0 | 0 | 0 | 0 | — | — | — | — | — | |
| Carney, Keith | (United States) | D | 1991–1994 | 51 | 4 | 9 | 13 | 77 | 15 | 0 | 6 | 6 | 6 | |
| Carrick, Sam | (Canada) | C | 2025–2026 | 13 | 5 | 1 | 6 | 12 | 1 | 0 | 0 | 0 | 2 | |
| Carrier, William | (Canada) | LW | 2016–2017 | 41 | 5 | 3 | 8 | 21 | — | — | — | — | — | |
| Carriere, Larry | (Canada) | D | 1972–1975; 1977–1978 | 207 | 9 | 43 | 52 | 284 | 23 | 0 | 3 | 3 | 40 | |
| Catenacci, Daniel | (Canada) | C | 2015–2016 | 11 | 0 | 0 | 0 | 0 | — | — | — | — | — | |
| Ciavaglia, Peter | (United States) | C | 1991–1993 | 5 | 0 | 0 | 0 | 0 | — | — | — | — | — | |
| Clague, Kale | (Canada) | D | 2022–2024 | 36 | 0 | 5 | 5 | 26 | — | — | — | — | — | |
| Clifton, Connor | (United States) | D | 2023–2025 | 152 | 5 | 29 | 34 | 133 | — | — | — | — | — | |
| Cloutier, Real | (Canada) | F | 1983–1985 | 81 | 24 | 36 | 60 | 25 | 2 | 0 | 0 | 0 | 0 | |
| Coliacovo, Carlo | (Canada) | D | 2015–2016 | 36 | 1 | 4 | 5 | 10 | — | — | — | — | — | |
| Conacher, Cory | (Canada) | C | 2013–2014 | 19 | 3 | 3 | 6 | 16 | — | — | — | — | — | |
| Conn, Rob | (Canada) | RW | 1995–1996 | 28 | 2 | 5 | 7 | 18 | — | — | — | — | — | |
| Connolly, Tim | (United States) | C | 2001–2003; 2005–2011 | 464 | 94 | 226 | 320 | 174 | 36 | 5 | 18 | 23 | 8 | |
| Corkum, Bob | (United States) | C | 1989–1990; 1991–1993; 2001–2002 | 106 | 10 | 9 | 19 | 67 | 14 | 2 | 0 | 2 | 6 | |
| Cozens, Dylan | (Canada) | C | 2020–2025 | 341 | 77 | 120 | 197 | 216 | — | — | — | — | — | |
| Creighton, Adam | (Canada) | C | 1983–1989 | 172 | 40 | 60 | 100 | 196 | — | — | — | — | — | |
| Criscuolo, Kyle | (United States) | C | 2017–2018 | 9 | 0 | 0 | 0 | 4 | — | — | — | — | — | |
| Cunneyworth, Randy | (Canada) | LW | 1980–1982; 1998–1999 | 35 | 4 | 6 | 10 | 49 | 3 | 0 | 0 | 0 | 0 | |
| Curran, Brian | (Canada) | D | 1990–1992 | 20 | 0 | 1 | 1 | 57 | — | — | — | — | — | |
| Cyr, Paul | (Canada) | F | 1982–1988 | 342 | 85 | 111 | 196 | 454 | 18 | 3 | 6 | 9 | 21 | |
| Dahlin, Rasmus | (Sweden) | D | 2018–2026 | 586 | 102 | 332 | 434 | 454 | 13 | 4 | 10 | 14 | 20 | |
| Dalpe, Zac | (Canada) | LW | 2014–2015 | 21 | 1 | 2 | 3 | 4 | — | — | — | — | — | |
| Danforth, Justin | (Canada) | RW/C | 2025–2026 | 4 | 0 | 0 | 0 | 2 | — | — | — | — | — | |
| D'Agostini, Matt | (Canada) | RW | 2013–2014 | 49 | 5 | 6 | 11 | 22 | — | — | — | — | — | |
| D'Amigo, Jerry | (United States) | RW | 2014–2015 | 9 | 0 | 0 | 0 | 2 | — | — | — | — | — | |
| Davidson, Brandon | (Canada) | D | 2020–2021 | 6 | 0 | 0 | 0 | 4 | — | — | — | — | — | |
| Davies, Jérémy | (Canada) | D | 2022–2023 | 1 | 0 | 0 | 0 | 2 | — | — | — | — | — | |
| Davis, Mal | (Canada) | RW | 1982–1986 | 89 | 29 | 22 | 51 | 34 | 7 | 1 | 0 | 1 | 0 | |
| Dawe, Jason | (Canada) | RW | 1993–1998 | 290 | 79 | 79 | 158 | 132 | 22 | 4 | 3 | 7 | 18 | |
| Dea, Jean-Sebastien | (Canada) | C | 2019–2021 | 4 | 0 | 0 | 0 | 0 | — | — | — | — | — | |
| Deadmarsh, Butch | (Canada) | LW | 1970–1973 | 56 | 2 | 2 | 4 | 39 | — | — | — | — | — | |
| DeGray, Dale | (Canada) | D | 1989–1990 | 6 | 0 | 0 | 0 | 6 | — | — | — | — | — | |
| Delmore, Andy | (Canada) | D | 2003–2004 | 37 | 2 | 5 | 7 | 29 | — | — | — | — | — | |
| Deslauriers, Nicolas | (Canada) | LW | 2013–2017 | 211 | 12 | 18 | 30 | 186 | — | — | — | — | — | |
| Deziel, Michel | (Canada) | LW | 1974–1975 | — | — | — | — | — | 1 | 0 | 0 | 0 | 0 | |
| Doan, Josh | (United States) | RW | 2025–2026 | 82 | 25 | 27 | 52 | 25 | 13 | 3 | 7 | 10 | 8 | |
| Donnelly, Gord | (Canada) | D | 1991–1994 | 134 | 5 | 11 | 16 | 557 | 6 | 0 | 1 | 1 | 0 | |
| Donnelly, Mike | (United States) | LW | 1987–1990 | 74 | 11 | 16 | 27 | 62 | — | — | — | — | — | |
| Drury, Chris | (United States) | LW | 2003–2007 | 234 | 85 | 104 | 189 | 130 | 34 | 17 | 14 | 31 | 12 | |
| Dudley, Rick | (Canada) | LW | 1972–1975; 1978–1981 | 279 | 70 | 94 | 164 | 264 | 25 | 7 | 2 | 9 | 69 | |
| Duff, Dick | (Canada) | LW | 1970–1972 | 61 | 9 | 15 | 24 | 12 | — | — | — | — | — | HHOF 2006 |
| Dumont, Jean-Pierre | (Canada) | RW | 2000–2006 | 362 | 102 | 121 | 223 | 218 | 31 | 11 | 10 | 21 | 22 | |
| Dunn, Richie | (United States) | D | 1977–1982; 1985–1989 | 327 | 27 | 105 | 132 | 235 | 27 | 2 | 14 | 16 | 16 | |
| Dunne, Josh | (United States) | C | 2024–2026 | 36 | 1 | 3 | 4 | 43 | 2 | 0 | 0 | 0 | 0 | |
| Dykstra, Steve | (Canada) | D | 1985–1988 | 128 | 5 | 23 | 28 | 378 | — | — | — | — | — | |
| Eakin, Cody | (Canada) | C | 2020–2022 | 115 | 7 | 12 | 19 | 36 | — | — | — | — | — | |
| Eatough, Jeff | (Canada) | RW | 1981–1982 | 1 | 0 | 0 | 0 | 0 | — | — | — | — | — | |
| Ehrhoff, Christian | (Germany) | D | 2011–2014 | 192 | 16 | 71 | 87 | 119 | — | — | — | — | — | |
| Eichel, Jack | (United States) | C | 2015–2021 | 375 | 139 | 216 | 355 | 142 | — | — | — | — | — | |
| Elie, Remi | (Canada) | LW | 2018–2019 | 16 | 0 | 1 | 1 | 2 | — | — | — | — | — | |
| Ellis, Matt | (Canada) | C | 2008–2015 | 286 | 18 | 23 | 41 | 57 | 4 | 1 | 0 | 1 | 0 | |
| Engblom, Brian | (Canada) | D | 1985–1986 | 30 | 1 | 4 | 5 | 16 | — | — | — | — | — | |
| Ennis, Tyler | (Canada) | C | 2009–2017 | 419 | 97 | 139 | 236 | 168 | 13 | 3 | 5 | 8 | 4 | |
| Errey, Bob | (Canada) | LW | 1992–1993 | 8 | 1 | 3 | 4 | 4 | 4 | 0 | 1 | 1 | 10 | |
| Evans, Chris | (Canada) | D | 1971–1972 | 61 | 6 | 18 | 24 | 98 | — | — | — | — | — | |
| Falk, Justin | (Canada) | D | 2016–2018 | 98 | 1 | 9 | 10 | 57 | — | — | — | — | — | |
| Fasching, Hudson | (United States) | RW | 2015–2018 | 22 | 1 | 2 | 3 | 8 | — | — | — | — | — | |
| Fedun, Taylor | (Canada) | D | 2016–2018 | 34 | 0 | 8 | 8 | 18 | — | — | — | — | — | |
| Fenyves, David | (Canada) | D | 1982–1987 | 148 | 2 | 27 | 29 | 87 | 11 | 0 | 0 | 0 | 2 | |
| Ferner, Mark | (Canada) | D | 1986–1987; 1988–1989 | 15 | 0 | 3 | 3 | 11 | — | — | — | — | — | |
| Finley, Joe | (United States) | D | 2011–2012 | 5 | 0 | 0 | 0 | 12 | — | — | — | — | — | |
| Fischer, Ron | (Canada) | D | 1981–1983 | 18 | 0 | 7 | 7 | 6 | — | — | — | — | — | |
| Fitzgerald, Casey | (United States) | D | 2021–2023 | 59 | 0 | 9 | 9 | 40 | — | — | — | — | — | |
| Fitzpatrick, Rory | (United States) | D | 2001–2006 | 157 | 9 | 15 | 24 | 114 | 11 | 0 | 4 | 4 | 16 | |
| Fleming, Reg | (Canada) | D | 1970–1971 | 78 | 6 | 10 | 16 | 159 | — | — | — | — | — | |
| Flynn, Brian | (United States) | C | 2012–2015 | 158 | 17 | 24 | 41 | 22 | — | — | — | — | — | |
| Fogarty, Steven | (United States) | C | 2020–2021 | 9 | 1 | 2 | 3 | 8 | — | — | — | — | — | |
| Fogolin, Lee | (United States) | D | 1974–1979; 1986–1987 | 338 | 8 | 70 | 78 | 432 | 30 | 0 | 6 | 6 | 58 | |
| Foligno, Marcus | (Canada) | LW | 2011–2017 | 347 | 49 | 67 | 116 | 334 | — | — | — | — | — | |
| Foligno, Mike | (Canada) | F | 1981–1991 | 664 | 247 | 264 | 511 | 1450 | 39 | 13 | 11 | 24 | 143 | |
| Franceschetti, Lou | (Canada) | RW | 1990–1992 | 36 | 1 | 7 | 8 | 28 | 6 | 1 | 0 | 1 | 2 | |
| Franson, Cody | (Canada) | D | 2015–2017 | 127 | 7 | 29 | 36 | 60 | — | — | — | — | — | |
| Frolik, Michael | (Czech Republic) | RW | 2019–2020 | 19 | 1 | 3 | 4 | 4 | — | — | — | — | — | |
| Funk, Michael | (Canada) | D | 2006–2008 | 9 | 0 | 2 | 2 | 0 | — | — | — | — | — | |
| Gage, Jody | (Canada) | RW | 1985–1986; 1987–1988; 1991–1992 | 18 | 3 | 3 | 6 | 2 | — | — | — | — | — | |
| Galley, Garry | (Canada) | D | 1994–1997 | 163 | 15 | 87 | 102 | 193 | 17 | 0 | 9 | 9 | 18 | |
| Gardner, Paul | (Canada) | C | 1985–1986 | 2 | 0 | 0 | 0 | 0 | — | — | — | — | — | |
| Gare, Danny | (Canada) | F | 1974–1982 | 503 | 267 | 233 | 500 | 686 | 58 | 23 | 21 | 44 | 147 | Ret #18 |
| Gaustad, Paul | (United States) | C | 2002–2003; 2005–2012 | 479 | 71 | 110 | 181 | 585 | 38 | 0 | 8 | 8 | 37 | |
| Geertsen, Mason | (Canada) | D | 2025–2026 | 5 | 0 | 0 | 0 | 12 | — | — | — | — | — | |
| Gerbe, Nathan | (United States) | LW | 2008–2013 | 188 | 29 | 43 | 72 | 88 | 9 | 3 | 1 | 4 | 18 | |
| Gilbert, Dennis | (United States) | D | 2024–2025 | 25 | 0 | 5 | 5 | 50 | — | — | — | — | — | |
| Gillies, Clark | (Canada) | F | 1986–1988 | 86 | 15 | 19 | 34 | 132 | 5 | 0 | 1 | 1 | 25 | HHOF 2002 |
| Gillis, Jere | (United States) | F | 1982–1983 | 3 | 0 | 0 | 0 | 0 | — | — | — | — | — | |
| Gilmour, Doug | (Canada) | C | 1999–2001 | 82 | 10 | 45 | 55 | 82 | 18 | 2 | 5 | 7 | 12 | |
| Gilmour, John | (Canada) | D | 2019–2020 | 4 | 0 | 0 | 0 | 0 | — | — | — | — | — | |
| Gionta, Brian | (United States) | RW | 2014–2017 | 230 | 40 | 63 | 103 | 52 | — | — | — | — | — | |
| Girgensons, Zemgus | (Latvia) | C | 2013–2024 | 688 | 89 | 99 | 188 | 192 | — | — | — | — | — | |
| Gordiouk, Viktor | (Russia) | LW | 1992–1993; 1994–1995 | 26 | 3 | 8 | 11 | 0 | — | — | — | — | — | |
| Gould, John | (Canada) | LW | 1971–1974; 1979–1980 | 92 | 14 | 12 | 26 | 13 | — | — | — | — | — | |
| Gorges, Josh | (Canada) | D | 2014–2018 | 223 | 3 | 23 | 26 | 155 | — | — | — | — | — | |
| Goyette, Phil | (Canada) | C | 1970–1972 | 97 | 18 | 67 | 85 | 20 | — | — | — | — | — | |
| Gragnani, Marc-Andre | (Canada) | LW | 2007–2009; 2010–2012 | 59 | 2 | 13 | 15 | 28 | 7 | 1 | 6 | 7 | 4 | |
| Grand-Pierre, Jean-Luc | (Canada) | D | 1998–2000 | 27 | 0 | 1 | 1 | 32 | 4 | 0 | 0 | 0 | 4 | |
| Grant, Derek | (Canada) | C | 2016–2017 | 40 | 0 | 3 | 3 | 19 | — | — | — | — | — | |
| Gratton, Chris | (Canada) | C | 1999–2003 | 244 | 50 | 81 | 131 | 278 | 18 | 6 | 5 | 11 | 18 | |
| Gratton, Norm | (Canada) | RW | 1972–1975 | 103 | 15 | 23 | 38 | 30 | 6 | 0 | 1 | 1 | 2 | |
| Greenway, Jordan | (United States) | LW | 2022–2026 | 158 | 18 | 28 | 46 | 138 | 13 | 2 | 1 | 3 | 6 | |
| Grier, Mike | (United States) | RW | 2003–2006; 2009–2011 | 241 | 23 | 47 | 70 | 58 | 31 | 5 | 6 | 11 | 4 | |
| Griffith, Seth | (Canada) | C | 2017–2018 | 21 | 2 | 1 | 3 | 6 | — | — | — | — | — | |
| Grigorenko, Mikhail | (Russia) | C | 2012–2015 | 68 | 6 | 8 | 14 | 4 | — | — | — | — | — | |
| Grosek, Michal | (Czech Republic) | RW | 1995–2000 | 308 | 62 | 98 | 160 | 299 | 40 | 9 | 11 | 20 | 64 | |
| Guay, François | (Canada) | C | 1989–1990 | 1 | 0 | 0 | 0 | 0 | — | — | — | — | — | |
| Guevremont, Jocelyn | (Canada) | D | 1974–1979 | 324 | 38 | 130 | 168 | 189 | 40 | 4 | 17 | 21 | 18 | |
| Guhle, Brendan | (Canada) | D | 2016–2019 | 23 | 0 | 5 | 5 | 12 | — | — | — | — | — | |
| Hagg, Robert | (Sweden) | D | 2021–2022 | 48 | 1 | 7 | 8 | 25 | — | — | — | — | — | |
| Hajdu, Richard | (Canada) | RW | 1985–1987 | 5 | 0 | 0 | 0 | 4 | — | — | — | — | — | |
| Hajt, Bill | (Canada) | D | 1973–1987 | 854 | 42 | 202 | 244 | 433 | 80 | 2 | 16 | 18 | 70 | |
| Halkidis, Bob | (Canada) | D | 1984–1989 | 89 | 2 | 14 | 16 | 315 | 8 | 0 | 0 | 0 | 41 | |
| Hall, Taylor | (Canada) | LW | 2020–2021 | 37 | 2 | 17 | 19 | 24 | — | — | — | — | — | |
| Haller, Kevin | (Canada) | D | 1989–1992 | 81 | 7 | 23 | 30 | 95 | 6 | 1 | 4 | 5 | 10 | |
| Hamel, Denis | (Canada) | LW | 1999–2003 | 130 | 13 | 9 | 22 | 67 | — | — | — | — | — | |
| Hamel, Gilles | (Canada) | RW | 1980–1986 | 365 | 92 | 114 | 206 | 215 | 18 | 2 | 5 | 7 | 8 | |
| Hamilton, Al | (Canada) | D | 1970–1972 | 145 | 6 | 58 | 64 | 176 | — | — | — | — | — | |
| Hannan, Dave | (Canada) | LW | 1991–1996 | 249 | 23 | 56 | 79 | 206 | 27 | 4 | 3 | 7 | 28 | |
| Harris, Hugh | (Canada) | C | 1972–1973 | 60 | 12 | 26 | 38 | 17 | 3 | 0 | 0 | 0 | 0 | |
| Hartman, Mike | (United States) | LW | 1986–1991 | 225 | 34 | 26 | 60 | 890 | 19 | 0 | 0 | 0 | 104 | |
| Hawerchuk, Dale | (Canada) | C | 1990–1995 | 342 | 110 | 275 | 385 | 204 | 30 | 9 | 25 | 34 | 16 | HHOF 2001 |
| Haworth, Alan | (Canada) | C | 1980–1982 | 106 | 37 | 38 | 75 | 64 | 10 | 4 | 5 | 9 | 4 | |
| Hayden, John | (United States) | C | 2021–2022 | 55 | 2 | 2 | 4 | 84 | — | — | — | — | — | |
| Hecht, Jochen | (Germany) | C | 2002–2013 | 613 | 138 | 207 | 345 | 322 | 32 | 6 | 8 | 14 | 18 | |
| Hecl, Radoslav | (Slovakia) | D | 2002–2003 | 14 | 0 | 0 | 0 | 2 | — | — | — | — | — | |
| Heinze, Steve | (United States) | RW | 2000–2001 | 14 | 5 | 7 | 12 | 8 | 13 | 3 | 4 | 7 | 10 | |
| Helenius, Konsta | (Finland) | F | 2025–2026 | 9 | 1 | 3 | 4 | 0 | 4 | 2 | 0 | 2 | 0 | |
| Hess, Bob | (Canada) | D | 1980–1982 | 33 | 0 | 8 | 8 | 14 | 1 | 1 | 0 | 1 | 0 | |
| Hillier, Randy | (Canada) | D | 1991–1992 | 28 | 0 | 1 | 1 | 48 | — | — | — | — | — | |
| Hillman, Larry | (Canada) | D | 1971–1973 | 121 | 6 | 35 | 41 | 114 | 6 | 0 | 0 | 0 | 8 | |
| Hinostroza, Vinnie | (United States) | C | 2021–2023 | 88 | 15 | 21 | 36 | 30 | — | — | — | — | — | |
| Hodgson, Cody | (Canada) | C | 2011–2015 | 218 | 44 | 55 | 99 | 54 | — | — | — | — | — | |
| Hofford, Jim | (Canada) | D | 1985–1987 | 17 | 0 | 0 | 0 | 45 | — | — | — | — | — | |
| Hogue, Benoit | (Canada) | RW | 1987–1992 | 196 | 45 | 67 | 112 | 275 | 13 | 3 | 1 | 4 | 37 | |
| Holland, Jason | (Canada) | D | 1998–2000 | 12 | 0 | 1 | 1 | 8 | 1 | 0 | 0 | 0 | 0 | |
| Holzinger, Brian | (United States) | C | 1994–2000 | 352 | 70 | 97 | 167 | 202 | 52 | 11 | 18 | 29 | 61 | |
| Horton, Tim | (Canada) | D | 1972–1974 | 124 | 1 | 22 | 23 | 109 | 6 | 0 | 1 | 1 | 4 | HHOF 1977; Ret #2 |
| Hospodar, Ed | (United States) | D | 1987–1988 | 42 | 0 | 1 | 1 | 98 | — | — | — | — | — | |
| Houda, Doug | (Canada) | D | 1994–1996; 1999–2000; 2002–2003 | 68 | 2 | 5 | 7 | 134 | — | — | — | — | — | |
| Houlder, Bill | (Canada) | D | 1990–1993 | 32 | 4 | 7 | 11 | 18 | 8 | 0 | 2 | 2 | 4 | |
| Housley, Phil | (United States) | D | 1982–1990 | 608 | 178 | 380 | 558 | 386 | 35 | 10 | 17 | 27 | 22 | HHOF 2015 |
| Huddy, Charlie | (Canada) | D | 1994–1997 | 85 | 7 | 9 | 16 | 95 | 3 | 0 | 0 | 0 | 0 | |
| Hughes, Brent | (Canada) | LW | 1995–1996 | 76 | 5 | 10 | 15 | 148 | — | — | — | — | — | |
| Hughes, Pat | (Canada) | F | 1985–1986 | 50 | 4 | 9 | 13 | 25 | — | — | — | — | — | |
| Hunwick, Matt | (United States) | D | 2018–2019 | 14 | 0 | 2 | 2 | 4 | — | — | — | — | — | |
| Hurlbut, Mike | (United States) | D | 1997–2000 | 5 | 0 | 0 | 0 | 4 | — | — | — | — | — | |
| Inglis, Bill | (Canada) | C | 1970–1971 | 14 | 0 | 1 | 1 | 4 | — | — | — | — | — | |
| Irwin, Matt | (Canada) | D | 2020–2021 | 24 | 0 | 2 | 2 | 19 | — | — | — | — | — | |
| Jackson, Dane | (Canada) | RW | 1995–1996 | 22 | 5 | 4 | 9 | 41 | — | — | — | — | — | |
| Jackson, Jim | (Canada) | RW | 1987–1988 | 5 | 2 | 0 | 2 | 0 | — | — | — | — | — | |
| James, Val | (United States) | LW | 1981–1982 | 7 | 0 | 0 | 0 | 16 | 3 | 0 | 0 | 0 | 0 | |
| Janik, Doug | (United States) | D | 2002–2006 | 10 | 0 | 0 | 0 | 21 | 5 | 1 | 0 | 1 | 2 | |
| Jankowski, Mark | (Canada) | C | 2021–2022 | 19 | 2 | 3 | 5 | 4 | — | — | — | — | — | |
| Jennings, Grant | (Canada) | D | 1995–1996 | 6 | 0 | 0 | 0 | 28 | — | — | — | — | — | |
| Jillson, Jeff | (United States) | D | 2003–2006 | 16 | 0 | 3 | 3 | 23 | 4 | 0 | 0 | 0 | 0 | |
| Johansson, Calle | (Sweden) | D | 1987–1989 | 118 | 6 | 49 | 55 | 70 | 6 | 0 | 1 | 1 | 0 | |
| Johansson, Marcus | (Sweden) | LW | 2019–2020 | 60 | 9 | 21 | 30 | 20 | — | — | — | — | — | |
| Johnson, Erik | (United States) | D | 2023–2024 | 50 | 3 | 0 | 3 | 24 | — | — | — | — | — | |
| Johnson, Ryan | (United States) | D | 2023–2026 | 47 | 0 | 7 | 7 | 18 | — | — | — | — | — | |
| Jokiharju, Henri | (Finland) | D | 2019–2025 | 351 | 19 | 62 | 81 | 122 | — | — | — | — | — | |
| Josefson, Jacob | (Sweden) | C | 2017–2018 | 39 | 2 | 2 | 4 | 6 | — | — | — | — | — | |
| Jost, Tyson | (Canada) | C | 2022–2024 | 102 | 10 | 18 | 28 | 33 | — | — | — | — | — | |
| Juneau, Joe | (Canada) | C | 1998–1999 | 9 | 1 | 1 | 2 | 2 | 20 | 3 | 8 | 11 | 10 | |
| Jutila, Timo | (Finland) | D | 1984–1985 | 10 | 1 | 5 | 6 | 13 | — | — | — | — | — | |
| Kaese, Trent | (Canada) | RW | 1988–1989 | 1 | 0 | 0 | 0 | 0 | — | — | — | — | — | |
| Kahun, Dominik | (Germany) | C | 2019–2020 | 6 | 2 | 2 | 4 | 0 | — | — | — | — | — | |
| Kaleta, Patrick | (United States) | RW | 2006–2016 | 348 | 27 | 27 | 54 | 542 | 12 | 2 | 3 | 5 | 28 | |
| Kalinin, Dmitri | (Russia) | D | 1999–2008 | 466 | 34 | 111 | 145 | 289 | 37 | 2 | 7 | 9 | 20 | |
| Kassian, Zack | (Canada) | RW | 2011–2012 | 27 | 3 | 4 | 7 | 20 | — | — | — | — | — | |
| Kane, Evander | (Canada) | LW | 2015–2018 | 196 | 68 | 50 | 118 | 261 | — | — | — | — | — | |
| Keenan, Larry | (Canada) | LW | 1970–1972 | 65 | 9 | 20 | 29 | 8 | — | — | — | — | — | |
| Kennedy, Dean | (Canada) | D | 1989–1991 | 144 | 6 | 20 | 26 | 172 | 8 | 1 | 2 | 3 | 29 | |
| Kennedy, Tim | (United States) | LW | 2008–2010 | 79 | 10 | 16 | 26 | 50 | 6 | 1 | 2 | 3 | 4 | |
| Kesselring, Michael | (United States) | D | 2025–2026 | 34 | 0 | 2 | 2 | 50 | 1 | 0 | 0 | 0 | 0 | |
| Khmylev, Yuri | (Russia) | LW | 1992–1996 | 253 | 63 | 87 | 150 | 131 | 20 | 7 | 5 | 12 | 20 | |
| Konopka, Zenon | (Canada) | C | 2013–2014 | 23 | 0 | 1 | 1 | 33 | — | — | — | — | — | |
| Korab, Jerry | (Canada) | D | 1973–1980; 1983–1985 | 537 | 67 | 216 | 283 | 870 | 46 | 7 | 14 | 21 | 69 | |
| Korn, Jim | (United States) | D | 1986–1987 | 51 | 4 | 10 | 14 | 158 | — | — | — | — | — | |
| Kotalik, Ales | (Czech Republic) | RW | 2001–2009 | 370 | 101 | 107 | 208 | 239 | 34 | 6 | 9 | 15 | 16 | |
| Kowal, Joe | (Canada) | LW | 1976–1978 | 22 | 0 | 5 | 5 | 13 | 2 | 0 | 0 | 0 | 0 | |
| Kozak, Tyson | (Canada) | C | 2024–2026 | 67 | 5 | 6 | 11 | 4 | 6 | 0 | 1 | 1 | 0 | |
| Kozlov, Vyacheslav | (Russia) | RW | 2001–2002 | 38 | 9 | 13 | 22 | 16 | — | — | — | — | — | |
| Krake, Skip | (Canada) | C | 1970–1971 | 74 | 4 | 5 | 9 | 68 | — | — | — | — | — | |
| Krebs, Peyton | (Canada) | C | 2021–2026 | 365 | 42 | 90 | 132 | 275 | 13 | 2 | 4 | 6 | 22 | |
| Kristek, Jaroslav | (Czech Republic) | RW | 2002–2003 | 6 | 0 | 0 | 0 | 4 | — | — | — | — | — | |
| Krupp, Uwe | (Germany) | D | 1986–1992 | 327 | 25 | 78 | 103 | 386 | 23 | 1 | 2 | 3 | 29 | |
| Kruse, Paul | (Canada) | LW | 1997–2000 | 66 | 4 | 1 | 5 | 206 | 11 | 1 | 0 | 1 | 8 | |
| Kulich, Jiri | (Czech Republic) | C | 2023–2026 | 75 | 18 | 11 | 29 | 22 | — | — | — | — | — | |
| Kulikov, Dmitry | (Russia) | D | 2016–2017 | 47 | 2 | 3 | 5 | 26 | — | — | — | — | — | |
| Kuntar, Trevor | (United States) | C | 2025–2026 | 1 | 0 | 0 | 0 | 0 | — | — | — | — | — | |
| Kurvers, Tom | (United States) | D | 1986–1987 | 55 | 6 | 17 | 23 | 22 | — | — | — | — | — | |
| Lacombe, François | (Canada) | D | 1970–1971 | 1 | 0 | 1 | 1 | 2 | — | — | — | — | — | |
| Lacombe, Normand | (Canada) | RW | 1984–1987 | 94 | 12 | 18 | 30 | 46 | — | — | — | — | — | |
| Lafferty, Sam | (United States) | C | 2024–2025 | 60 | 4 | 3 | 7 | 28 | — | — | — | — | — | |
| LaFontaine, Pat | (United States) | C | 1991–1997 | 268 | 158 | 227 | 385 | 207 | 19 | 12 | 15 | 27 | 6 | HHOF 2003; Ret #16 |
| Lagace, Jean-Guy | (Canada) | D | 1970–1971 | 3 | 0 | 0 | 0 | 2 | — | — | — | — | — | |
| Lambert, Yvon | (Canada) | LW | 1981–1982 | 77 | 25 | 39 | 64 | 38 | 4 | 3 | 0 | 3 | 2 | |
| Langevin, Chris | (Canada) | F | 1983–1984; 1985–1986 | 22 | 3 | 1 | 4 | 22 | — | — | — | — | — | |
| Larson, Reed | (United States) | D | 1989–1990 | 1 | 0 | 0 | 0 | 0 | — | — | — | — | — | |
| Larsson, Johan | (Sweden) | F | 2013–2020 | 392 | 38 | 59 | 97 | 190 | — | — | — | — | — | |
| Lawson, Danny | (Canada) | RW | 1971–1972 | 78 | 10 | 6 | 16 | 15 | — | — | — | — | — | |
| Lazar, Curtis | (Canada) | C | 2019–2021 | 71 | 10 | 9 | 19 | 9 | — | — | — | — | — | |
| Ledyard, Grant | (Canada) | D | 1988–1993 | 240 | 18 | 71 | 89 | 181 | 19 | 4 | 5 | 9 | 20 | |
| Legwand, David | (United States) | C | 2015–2016 | 79 | 5 | 9 | 14 | 14 | — | — | — | — | — | |
| Leino, Ville | (Finland) | C | 2011–2014 | 137 | 10 | 36 | 46 | 32 | — | — | — | — | — | |
| Lemieux, Real | (Canada) | RW | 1973–1974 | 38 | 1 | 1 | 2 | 4 | — | — | — | — | — | |
| Leopold, Jordan | (United States) | D | 2010–2013 | 174 | 25 | 42 | 67 | 78 | 5 | 0 | 1 | 1 | 4 | |
| Lever, Don | (Canada) | F | 1985–1987 | 39 | 10 | 3 | 13 | 10 | — | — | — | — | — | |
| Loewen, Darcy | (Canada) | LW | 1989–1992 | 12 | 0 | 0 | 0 | 14 | — | — | — | — | — | |
| Logan, Bob | (Canada) | F | 1986–1988 | 38 | 10 | 5 | 15 | 0 | — | — | — | — | — | |
| Lorentz, Jim | (Canada) | C | 1971–1978 | 485 | 134 | 197 | 331 | 126 | 37 | 11 | 9 | 20 | 22 | |
| Luce, Don | (Canada) | C | 1971–1981 | 766 | 216 | 310 | 526 | 304 | 62 | 17 | 19 | 36 | 46 | |
| Ludvig, Jan | (Czechoslovakia) | F | 1987–1989 | 26 | 1 | 8 | 9 | 104 | — | — | — | — | — | |
| Ludzik, Steve | (Canada) | F | 1989–1990 | 11 | 0 | 1 | 1 | 6 | — | — | — | — | — | |
| Lydman, Toni | (Finland) | D | 2005–2010 | 371 | 14 | 91 | 105 | 311 | 40 | 3 | 7 | 10 | 38 | |
| Lyubushkin, Ilya | (Russia) | D | 2022–2023 | 68 | 2 | 12 | 14 | 38 | — | — | — | — | — | |
| MacArthur, Clarke | (Canada) | LW | 2006–2010 | 187 | 41 | 38 | 79 | 127 | — | — | — | — | — | |
| MacDonald, Doug | (Canada) | C | 1992–1995 | 15 | 1 | 0 | 1 | 10 | — | — | — | — | — | |
| MacInnis, Ryan | (United States) | C | 2021–2022 | 1 | 0 | 0 | 0 | 0 | — | — | — | — | — | |
| Maguire, Kevin | (Canada) | F | 1987–1990 | 167 | 18 | 25 | 43 | 518 | 10 | 0 | 0 | 0 | 86 | |
| Mair, Adam | (Canada) | RW | 2002–2010 | 498 | 35 | 70 | 105 | 701 | 25 | 2 | 5 | 7 | 14 | |
| Makela, Mikko | (Finland) | LW | 1990–1991 | 60 | 15 | 7 | 22 | 25 | — | — | — | — | — | |
| Malenstyn, Beck | (Canada) | LW | 2024–2026 | 157 | 11 | 13 | 24 | 67 | 13 | 1 | 2 | 3 | 8 | |
| Malone, Sean | (United States) | C | 2016–2017 | 1 | 0 | 0 | 0 | 0 | — | — | — | — | — | |
| Maloney, Dave | (Canada) | D | 1984–1985 | 52 | 1 | 21 | 22 | 41 | 1 | 0 | 0 | 0 | 0 | |
| Mancari, Mark | (Canada) | RW | 2006–2007; 2008–2011 | 36 | 3 | 10 | 13 | 22 | 1 | 0 | 0 | 0 | 0 | |
| Marshall, Don | (Canada) | C | 1970–1971 | 62 | 20 | 29 | 49 | 6 | — | — | — | — | — | |
| Martin, Rick | (Canada) | F | 1971–1981 | 681 | 382 | 313 | 695 | 475 | 62 | 24 | 29 | 53 | 74 | Ret #7 |
| Martin, Terry | (Canada) | F | 1975–1979 | 148 | 20 | 22 | 42 | 50 | 11 | 2 | 2 | 4 | 10 | |
| May, Brad | (Canada) | LW | 1991–1998 | 425 | 67 | 89 | 156 | 1323 | 36 | 3 | 8 | 11 | 59 | |
| McAdam, Gary | (Canada) | F | 1975–1979; 1982–1983 | 227 | 40 | 45 | 85 | 76 | 15 | 3 | 2 | 5 | 7 | |
| McBain, Jamie | (United States) | D | 2013–2014 | 69 | 6 | 11 | 17 | 14 | — | — | — | — | — | |
| McCabe, Jake | (United States) | D | 2014–2021 | 353 | 18 | 59 | 77 | 203 | — | — | — | — | — | |
| McClanahan, Rob | (United States) | F | 1979–1981 | 66 | 5 | 17 | 22 | 38 | 15 | 0 | 2 | 2 | 17 | |
| McCormick, Cody | (Canada) | C | 2009–2014; 2014-2015 | 201 | 11 | 22 | 33 | 303 | 10 | 1 | 2 | 3 | 16 | |
| McCourt, Dale | (Canada) | F | 1981–1984 | 119 | 41 | 57 | 98 | 22 | 14 | 5 | 5 | 10 | 4 | |
| McDonald, Brian | (Canada) | C | 1970–1971 | 12 | 0 | 0 | 0 | 29 | — | — | — | — | — | |
| McGinn, Jamie | (Canada) | LW | 2015–2016 | 63 | 14 | 13 | 27 | 10 | — | — | — | — | — | |
| McIntosh, Paul | (Canada) | D | 1974–1976 | 48 | 0 | 2 | 2 | 66 | 2 | 0 | 0 | 0 | 7 | |
| McKay, Ray | (Canada) | D | 1971–1973 | 40 | 0 | 3 | 3 | 18 | — | — | — | — | — | |
| McKee, Jay | (Canada) | D | 1995–2006 | 582 | 17 | 81 | 98 | 470 | 51 | 3 | 6 | 9 | 60 | |
| McKegney, Tony | (Canada) | F | 1978–1983 | 363 | 127 | 141 | 268 | 117 | 38 | 11 | 9 | 20 | 10 | |
| McKenna, Sean | (Canada) | F | 1981–1986 | 237 | 56 | 53 | 109 | 120 | 8 | 1 | 1 | 2 | 2 | |
| McLeod, Ryan | (Canada) | C | 2024–2026 | 160 | 34 | 73 | 107 | 32 | 13 | 1 | 4 | 5 | 2 | |
| McLlwain, Dave | (Canada) | C | 1991–1992 | 5 | 0 | 0 | 0 | 2 | — | — | — | — | — | |
| McMahon, Mike | (Canada) | D | 1970–1971 | 12 | 0 | 0 | 0 | 4 | — | — | — | — | — | |
| McMorrow, Sean | (Canada) | RW | 2002–2003 | 1 | 0 | 0 | 0 | 0 | — | — | — | — | — | |
| McNabb, Brayden | (Canada) | D | 2011–2012 | 25 | 1 | 7 | 8 | 15 | — | — | — | — | — | |
| McNab, Peter | (Canada) | F | 1973–1976 | 154 | 49 | 59 | 108 | 26 | 25 | 2 | 6 | 8 | 4 | |
| McSheffrey, Bryan | (Canada) | F | 1974–1975 | 3 | 0 | 0 | 0 | 0 | — | — | — | — | — | |
| McSween, Donald | (United States) | D | 1987–1988; 1989–1990 | 9 | 0 | 1 | 1 | 12 | — | — | — | — | — | |
| Meehan, Gerry | (Canada) | LW | 1970–1975 | 306 | 94 | 114 | 208 | 60 | 6 | 0 | 1 | 1 | 0 | |
| Melanson, Dean | (Canada) | D | 1994–1995 | 5 | 0 | 0 | 0 | 4 | — | — | — | — | — | |
| Meszaros, Andrej | (Slovakia) | D | 2014–2015 | 60 | 7 | 7 | 14 | 36 | — | — | — | — | — | |
| Metcalfe, Scott | (Canada) | C | 1987–1990 | 17 | 1 | 2 | 3 | 18 | — | — | — | — | — | |
| Metsa, Zach | (United States) | D | 2025–2026 | 43 | 2 | 4 | 6 | 8 | 2 | 1 | 0 | 1 | 0 | |
| Mickey, Larry | (Canada) | RW | 1971–1975 | 117 | 20 | 14 | 34 | 57 | 6 | 1 | 0 | 1 | 5 | |
| Miller, Brad | (Canada) | D | 1988–1992 | 63 | 1 | 4 | 5 | 265 | — | — | — | — | — | |
| Miller, Colin | (Canada) | D | 2019–2022 | 137 | 7 | 30 | 37 | 70 | — | — | — | — | — | |
| Milley, Norm | (Canada) | RW | 2001–2004 | 15 | 0 | 3 | 3 | 8 | — | — | — | — | — | |
| Mitchell, Torrey | (Canada) | C | 2013–2015 | 60 | 7 | 7 | 14 | 30 | — | — | — | — | — | |
| Mittelstadt, Casey | (United States) | C | 2017–2024 | 339 | 62 | 124 | 186 | 78 | — | — | — | — | — | |
| Mogilny, Alexander | (Soviet Union) (Russia) | RW | 1989–1995 | 381 | 211 | 233 | 444 | 203 | 31 | 14 | 16 | 30 | 18 | |
| Moller, Mike | (Canada) | RW | 1980–1985 | 127 | 13 | 27 | 40 | 41 | 3 | 0 | 1 | 1 | 0 | |
| Moller, Randy | (Canada) | D | 1991–1994 | 125 | 5 | 20 | 25 | 296 | 14 | 0 | 2 | 2 | 16 | |
| Molloy, Mitch | (Canada) | LW | 1989–1990 | 2 | 0 | 0 | 0 | 10 | — | — | — | — | — | |
| Mongrain, Bob | (Canada) | C | 1979–1982; 1983–1985 | 70 | 11 | 11 | 22 | 12 | 11 | 1 | 2 | 3 | 4 | |
| Montador, Steve | (Canada) | D | 2009–2011 | 151 | 10 | 39 | 49 | 158 | 6 | 1 | 1 | 2 | 14 | |
| Montour, Brandon | (Canada) | D | 2018–2021 | 112 | 13 | 29 | 42 | 68 | — | — | — | — | — | |
| Moore, Barrie | (Canada) | LW | 1995–1997 | 34 | 2 | 6 | 8 | 18 | — | — | — | — | — | |
| Moore, Dominic | (Canada) | C | 2008–2009 | 18 | 1 | 3 | 4 | 23 | — | — | — | — | — | |
| Moravec, David | (Czech Republic) | RW | 1999–2000 | 1 | 0 | 0 | 0 | 0 | — | — | — | — | — | |
| Morrisonn, Shaone | (Canada) | D | 2010–2011 | 62 | 1 | 4 | 5 | 32 | 1 | 0 | 0 | 0 | 2 | |
| Moulson, Matt | (Canada) | LW | 2013–2014; 2014–2018 | 297 | 46 | 77 | 123 | 52 | — | — | — | — | — | |
| Muni, Craig | (Canada) | D | 1993–1996 | 160 | 2 | 18 | 20 | 167 | 12 | 0 | 1 | 1 | 6 | |
| Murray, Brett | (Canada) | LW | 2020–2025 | 26 | 2 | 4 | 6 | 25 | — | — | — | — | — | |
| Myers, Hap | (Canada) | D | 1970–1971 | 13 | 0 | 0 | 0 | 6 | — | — | — | — | — | |
| Myers, Tyler | (Canada) | D | 2009–2015 | 365 | 45 | 106 | 151 | 256 | 13 | 2 | 5 | 7 | 20 | |
| Napier, Mark | (Canada) | RW | 1986–1989 | 128 | 26 | 30 | 56 | 41 | 9 | 1 | 3 | 4 | 0 | |
| Ndur, Rumun | (Canada) | D | 1996–1999 | 11 | 0 | 0 | 0 | 20 | — | — | — | — | — | |
| Nelson, Casey | (United States) | D | 2015–2019 | 93 | 4 | 14 | 18 | 33 | — | — | — | — | — | |
| Nichol, Scott | (Canada) | C | 1995–1996; 1997–1998 | 5 | 0 | 0 | 0 | 14 | — | — | — | — | — | |
| Niedermayer, Rob | (Canada) | C | 2010–2011 | 71 | 5 | 14 | 19 | 22 | 7 | 1 | 3 | 4 | 2 | |
| Nolan, Jordan | (Canada) | C | 2017–2018 | 69 | 4 | 4 | 8 | 69 | — | — | — | — | — | |
| Noris, Joe | (United States) | C | 1973–1974 | 18 | 0 | 0 | 0 | 2 | — | — | — | — | — | |
| Norris, Josh | (United States) | C | 2024–2026 | 47 | 14 | 22 | 36 | 38 | 10 | 1 | 2 | 3 | 6 | |
| Novotny, Jiri | (Czech Republic) | C | 2005–2007 | 64 | 8 | 8 | 16 | 26 | 4 | 0 | 0 | 0 | 0 | |
| Numminen, Teppo | (Finland) | D | 2005–2009 | 212 | 6 | 80 | 86 | 90 | 28 | 1 | 5 | 6 | 8 | |
| Nylander, Alexander | (Sweden) | LW | 2016–2019 | 19 | 3 | 3 | 6 | 4 | — | — | — | — | — | |
| O'Regan, Danny | (United States) | C | 2017–2019 | 3 | 0 | 0 | 0 | 0 | — | — | — | — | — | |
| Okposo, Kyle | (United States) | RW | 2016–2024 | 516 | 103 | 142 | 245 | 242 | — | — | — | — | — | |
| Omark, Linus | (Sweden) | LW | 2013–2014 | 13 | 0 | 2 | 2 | 6 | — | — | — | — | — | |
| Olofsson, Victor | (Sweden) | RW | 2018–2024 | 314 | 90 | 92 | 182 | 28 | — | — | — | — | — | |
| O'Reilly, Cal | (Canada) | C | 2015–2017 | 31 | 3 | 5 | 8 | 2 | — | — | — | — | — | |
| O'Reilly, Ryan | (Canada) | C | 2015–2018 | 224 | 65 | 111 | 176 | 20 | — | — | — | — | — | |
| Orlando, Gates | (Canada) | F | 1984–1987 | 98 | 18 | 26 | 44 | 51 | 5 | 0 | 4 | 4 | 14 | |
| O'Shea, Kevin | (Canada) | F | 1970–1972 | 93 | 10 | 13 | 23 | 52 | — | — | — | — | — | |
| Ostlund, Noah | (Sweden) | C | 2024–2026 | 68 | 11 | 16 | 27 | 16 | 3 | 1 | 1 | 2 | 2 | |
| Ott, Steve | (Canada) | C | 2012–2014 | 107 | 18 | 26 | 44 | 148 | — | — | — | — | — | |
| Paetsch, Nathan | (Canada) | D | 2005–2010 | 157 | 7 | 35 | 42 | 108 | 1 | 0 | 0 | 0 | 0 | |
| Paiement, Wilf | (Canada) | RW | 1986–1987 | 56 | 20 | 17 | 37 | 108 | — | — | — | — | — | |
| Paille, Daniel | (Canada) | LW | 2005–2010 | 195 | 35 | 42 | 77 | 54 | 1 | 0 | 0 | 0 | 0 | |
| Pardy, Adam | (Canada) | D | 2012–2013 | 17 | 0 | 4 | 4 | 14 | — | — | — | — | — | |
| Parker, Jeff | (United States) | RW | 1986–1990 | 137 | 16 | 19 | 35 | 161 | 5 | 0 | 0 | 0 | 26 | |
| Parrish, Mark | (United States) | RW | 2010–2011 | 2 | 0 | 0 | 0 | 0 | — | — | — | — | — | |
| Paslawski, Greg | (Canada) | RW | 1990–1991 | 12 | 2 | 1 | 3 | 4 | — | — | — | — | — | |
| Patrick, James | (Canada) | D | 1998–2004 | 345 | 23 | 51 | 74 | 104 | 38 | 1 | 4 | 5 | 16 | |
| Patrick, Steve | (Canada) | F | 1980–1985 | 152 | 21 | 34 | 55 | 125 | 8 | 0 | 1 | 1 | 6 | |
| Patterson, Colin | (Canada) | F | 1991–1993 | 88 | 8 | 10 | 18 | 52 | 13 | 1 | 1 | 2 | 2 | |
| Pearson, Scott | (Canada) | LW | 1994–1996 | 41 | 6 | 1 | 7 | 87 | 5 | 0 | 0 | 0 | 4 | |
| Pearson, Tanner | (Canada) | LW | 2025–2026 | 4 | 0 | 2 | 2 | 2 | — | — | — | — | — | |
| Peca, Michael | (Canada) | C | 1995–2000 | 363 | 96 | 121 | 217 | 352 | 49 | 8 | 13 | 21 | 38 | |
| Perreault, Gilbert | (Canada) | C | 1970–1987 | 1191 | 512 | 814 | 1326 | 500 | 90 | 33 | 70 | 103 | 44 | HHOF 1990; Ret #11 |
| Perry, Brian | (Canada) | LW | 1970–1971 | 1 | 0 | 0 | 0 | 0 | — | — | — | — | — | |
| Peterka, John-Jason | (Germany) | RW | 2021–2025 | 238 | 67 | 83 | 150 | 88 | — | — | — | — | — | |
| Peters, Andrew | (Canada) | LW | 2003–2009 | 200 | 4 | 3 | 7 | 557 | — | — | — | — | — | |
| Peterson, Brent | (Canada) | RW | 1981–1985 | 265 | 43 | 63 | 106 | 180 | 22 | 2 | 3 | 5 | 50 | |
| Petrenko, Sergei | (Russia) | LW | 1993–1994 | 14 | 0 | 4 | 4 | 0 | — | — | — | — | — | |
| Pilut, Lawrence | (Sweden) | D | 2018–2023 | 63 | 2 | 7 | 9 | 24 | — | — | — | — | — | |
| Pittis, Domenic | (Canada) | C | 1998–2000; 2003–2004 | 14 | 1 | 0 | 1 | 12 | — | — | — | — | — | |
| Plante, Derek | (United States) | C | 1993–1999 | 395 | 91 | 145 | 236 | 126 | 30 | 5 | 9 | 14 | 14 | |
| Playfair, Larry | (Canada) | D | 1978–1986; 1988–1990 | 577 | 24 | 76 | 100 | 1390 | 40 | 0 | 6 | 6 | 97 | |
| Pominville, Jason | (Canada) | RW | 2003–2013; 2017–2019 | 733 | 217 | 304 | 521 | 159 | 45 | 12 | 16 | 28 | 12 | |
| Pouliot, Benoit | (Canada) | LW | 2017–2018 | 74 | 13 | 6 | 19 | 22 | — | — | — | — | — | |
| Power, Owen | (Canada) | D | 2021–2026 | 323 | 27 | 113 | 140 | 86 | 13 | 0 | 6 | 6 | 0 | |
| Pratt, Nolan | (Canada) | D | 2007–2008 | 55 | 1 | 6 | 7 | 30 | — | — | — | — | — | |
| Pratt, Tracy | (United States) | D | 1970–1974 | 210 | 2 | 39 | 41 | 399 | 6 | 0 | 0 | 0 | 6 | |
| Presley, Wayne | (United States) | RW | 1991–1995 | 202 | 48 | 32 | 80 | 297 | 27 | 9 | 5 | 14 | 42 | |
| Priestlay, Ken | (Canada) | C | 1986–1990 | 117 | 25 | 25 | 50 | 59 | 14 | 0 | 0 | 0 | 21 | |
| Primeau, Wayne | (Canada) | C | 1994–2000 | 225 | 19 | 25 | 44 | 227 | 42 | 4 | 7 | 11 | 18 | |
| Prow, Ethan | (United States) | D | 2021–2022 | 4 | 1 | 0 | 1 | 0 | — | — | — | — | — | |
| Pyatt, Taylor | (Canada) | LW | 2001–2006 | 230 | 38 | 42 | 80 | 131 | 14 | 0 | 5 | 5 | 10 | |
| Pysyk, Mark | (Canada) | D | 2012–2016; 2021–2022 | 193 | 8 | 30 | 38 | 66 | — | — | — | — | — | |
| Quinn, Jack | (Canada) | RW | 2021–2026 | 260 | 59 | 89 | 148 | 59 | 13 | 2 | 5 | 7 | 0 | |
| Ramsay, Craig | (Canada) | F | 1971–1985 | 1070 | 252 | 420 | 672 | 201 | 89 | 17 | 31 | 48 | 27 | |
| Ramsey, Mike | (United States) | D | 1979–1993 | 911 | 73 | 256 | 329 | 924 | 72 | 8 | 18 | 26 | 158 | |
| Ramsey, Wayne | (Canada) | D | 1977–1978 | 2 | 0 | 0 | 0 | 0 | — | — | — | — | — | |
| Rasmussen, Erik | (United States) | C | 1997–2002 | 281 | 33 | 46 | 79 | 179 | 27 | 2 | 5 | 7 | 22 | |
| Ray, Rob | (Canada) | RW | 1989–2003 | 889 | 40 | 50 | 90 | 3189 | 55 | 3 | 2 | 5 | 169 | |
| Redmond, Zach | (United States) | D | 2017–2018 | 14 | 0 | 0 | 0 | 2 | — | — | — | — | — | |
| Reekie, Joe | (Canada) | D | 1985–1989 | 104 | 3 | 15 | 18 | 190 | 2 | 0 | 0 | 0 | 4 | |
| Regehr, Robyn | (Canada) | D | 2011–2013 | 105 | 1 | 6 | 7 | 77 | — | — | — | — | — | |
| Reinhart, Sam | (Canada) | C | 2014–2021 | 454 | 134 | 161 | 295 | 90 | — | — | — | — | — | |
| Renaud, Mark | (Canada) | D | 1983–1984 | 10 | 1 | 3 | 4 | 6 | — | — | — | — | — | |
| Richard, Jacques | (Canada) | C | 1975–1977; 1978–1979 | 155 | 24 | 38 | 62 | 73 | 9 | 1 | 1 | 2 | 7 | |
| Richer, Bob | (Canada) | D | 1972–1973 | 3 | 0 | 0 | 0 | 0 | — | — | — | — | — | |
| Rieder, Tobias | (Germany) | C | 2020–2021 | 44 | 5 | 2 | 7 | 2 | — | — | — | — | — | |
| Ristolainen, Rasmus | (Finland) | D | 2013–2021 | 542 | 46 | 199 | 245 | 291 | — | — | — | — | — | |
| Rivet, Craig | (Canada) | D | 2008–2011 | 165 | 4 | 38 | 42 | 237 | 6 | 1 | 0 | 1 | 11 | |
| Robert, Rene | (Canada) | C | 1971–1979 | 524 | 222 | 330 | 552 | 401 | 47 | 22 | 17 | 39 | 71 | Ret #14 |
| Robertson, Geordie | (Canada) | C | 1982–1983 | 5 | 1 | 2 | 3 | 7 | — | — | — | — | — | |
| Robinson, Eric | (United States) | LW | 2023–2024 | 40 | 2 | 7 | 9 | 19 | — | — | — | — | — | |
| Robitaille, Mike | (Canada) | D | 1971–1975 | 170 | 8 | 46 | 54 | 122 | 6 | 0 | 0 | 0 | 0 | |
| Rodrigues, Evan | (Canada) | C | 2015–2020 | 192 | 26 | 45 | 71 | 53 | — | — | — | — | — | |
| Rombough, Doug | (Canada) | C | 1972–1974 | 51 | 8 | 9 | 17 | 27 | — | — | — | — | — | |
| Ronan, Ed | (United States) | RW | 1996–1997 | 18 | 1 | 4 | 5 | 11 | 6 | 1 | 0 | 1 | 6 | |
| Rosen, Isak | (Sweden) | RW | 2023–2026 | 31 | 3 | 5 | 8 | 0 | — | — | — | — | — | |
| Rousek, Lukas | (Czech Republic) | RW | 2022–2024 | 17 | 1 | 3 | 4 | 0 | — | — | — | — | — | |
| Roy, Derek | (Canada) | C | 2003–2012 | 549 | 161 | 266 | 427 | 331 | 41 | 7 | 18 | 25 | 34 | |
| Ruff, Lindy | (Canada) | F | 1979–1989 | 608 | 102 | 183 | 285 | 1126 | 42 | 11 | 10 | 21 | 164 | |
| Ruhwedel, Chad | (United States) | D | 2012–2016 | 33 | 0 | 2 | 2 | 4 | — | — | — | — | — | |
| Ruotsalainen, Arttu | (Finland) | F | 2020–2022 | 35 | 7 | 3 | 10 | 14 | — | — | — | — | — | |
| Russell, Phil | (Canada) | D | 1985–1987 | 18 | 2 | 5 | 7 | 24 | — | — | — | — | — | |
| Ruuttu, Christian | (Finland) | C | 1986–1992 | 438 | 101 | 230 | 331 | 483 | 29 | 3 | 8 | 11 | 45 | |
| Ryan, Michael | (United States) | LW | 2006–2008 | 65 | 7 | 6 | 13 | 32 | — | — | — | — | — | |
| Samuelsson, Mattias | (Sweden) | D | 2020–2026 | 290 | 20 | 64 | 84 | 116 | 13 | 3 | 4 | 7 | 2 | |
| Sanderson, Geoff | (Canada) | LW | 1997–2000 | 168 | 29 | 36 | 65 | 64 | 38 | 7 | 9 | 16 | 26 | |
| Sarich, Cory | (Canada) | D | 1998–2000 | 46 | 0 | 4 | 4 | 35 | — | — | — | — | — | |
| Satan, Miroslav | (Slovakia) | RW | 1996–2004 | 578 | 224 | 232 | 456 | 233 | 51 | 14 | 21 | 35 | 14 | |
| Sauvé, Jean-François | (Canada) | C | 1980–1983 | 98 | 24 | 49 | 73 | 70 | 7 | 2 | 2 | 4 | 0 | |
| Savage, Joel | (Canada) | RW | 1990–1991 | 3 | 0 | 1 | 1 | 0 | — | — | — | — | — | |
| Savard, Andre | (Canada) | C | 1976–1983 | 467 | 130 | 175 | 305 | 221 | 45 | 5 | 11 | 16 | 40 | |
| Savoie, Matthew | (Canada) | C | 2023–2024 | 1 | 0 | 0 | 0 | 0 | — | — | — | — | — | |
| Scandella, Marco | (Canada) | D | 2017–2020 | 176 | 14 | 30 | 44 | 71 | — | — | — | — | — | |
| Schaller, Tim | (United States) | F | 2014–2016 | 31 | 2 | 3 | 5 | 4 | — | — | — | — | — | |
| Schenn, Luke | (Canada) | D | 2025–2026 | 4 | 0 | 0 | 0 | 11 | 2 | 0 | 0 | 0 | 0 | |
| Schmautz, Cliff | (Canada) | RW | 1970–1971 | 26 | 5 | 7 | 12 | 10 | — | — | — | — | — | |
| Schneider, Cole | (United States) | LW | 2015–2017 | 6 | 0 | 1 | 1 | 0 | — | — | — | — | — | |
| Schock, Ron | (Canada) | C | 1977–1978 | 40 | 4 | 4 | 8 | 0 | 2 | 0 | 0 | 0 | 0 | |
| Schoenfeld, Jim | (Canada) | D | 1972–1982; 1984–1985 | 584 | 45 | 183 | 228 | 1025 | 75 | 3 | 13 | 16 | 151 | |
| Schultz, Dave | (Canada) | LW | 1978–1980 | 41 | 3 | 3 | 6 | 114 | 3 | 0 | 2 | 2 | 4 | |
| Scott, John | (Canada) | LW | 2012–2014 | 34 | 1 | 0 | 1 | 194 | — | — | — | — | — | |
| Seiling, Ric | (Canada) | RW | 1977–1986 | 664 | 176 | 200 | 376 | 524 | 55 | 14 | 14 | 28 | 31 | |
| Sejba, Jiri | (Czechoslovakia) | F | 1990–1991 | 11 | 0 | 2 | 2 | 8 | — | — | — | — | — | |
| Sekera, Andrej | (Slovakia) | D | 2006–2013 | 339 | 17 | 75 | 92 | 102 | 8 | 1 | 0 | 1 | 11 | |
| Semenov, Anatoli | (Russia) | C | 1996–1997 | 25 | 2 | 4 | 6 | 2 | — | — | — | — | — | |
| Shack, Eddie | (Canada) | F | 1970–1972 | 106 | 36 | 31 | 67 | 127 | — | — | — | — | — | |
| Shannon, Darrin | (Canada) | LW | 1988–1992 | 55 | 10 | 14 | 24 | 16 | 14 | 1 | 3 | 4 | 8 | |
| Shannon, Darryl | (Canada) | D | 1995–1999 | 255 | 12 | 56 | 68 | 240 | 29 | 4 | 7 | 11 | 16 | |
| Sheahan, Riley | (Canada) | C | 2020–2023 | 55 | 4 | 9 | 13 | 12 | — | — | — | — | — | |
| Sheary, Conor | (United States) | LW | 2018–2020 | 133 | 23 | 30 | 53 | 20 | — | — | — | — | — | |
| Sheppard, Ray | (Canada) | RW | 1987–1990 | 159 | 64 | 50 | 114 | 29 | 7 | 1 | 2 | 3 | 2 | |
| Simmonds, Wayne | (Canada) | RW | 2019–2020 | 7 | 0 | 1 | 1 | 2 | — | — | — | — | — | |
| Simon, Todd | (Canada) | C | 1993–1994 | 15 | 0 | 1 | 1 | 0 | 5 | 1 | 0 | 1 | 0 | |
| Simpson, Craig | (Canada) | LW | 1993–1995 | 46 | 12 | 15 | 27 | 34 | — | — | — | — | — | |
| Skinner, Jeff | (Canada) | C | 2018–2024 | 427 | 153 | 138 | 291 | 183 | — | — | — | — | — | |
| Smehlik, Richard | (Czech Republic) | D | 1992–1995; 1996–2002 | 589 | 47 | 135 | 182 | 399 | 83 | 1 | 14 | 15 | 38 | |
| Smith, C. J. | (United States) | LW | 2016–2021 | 14 | 2 | 1 | 3 | 0 | — | — | — | — | — | |
| Smith, Dalton | (Canada) | D | 2019–2020 | 1 | 0 | 0 | 0 | 2 | — | — | — | — | — | |
| Smith, Derek | (Canada) | F | 1975–1982 | 244 | 65 | 98 | 163 | 38 | 30 | 9 | 14 | 23 | 13 | |
| Smith, Doug | (Canada) | C | 1985–1988 | 162 | 35 | 54 | 89 | 296 | 1 | 0 | 0 | 0 | 0 | |
| Smith, Floyd | (Canada) | F | 1970–1972 | 83 | 6 | 12 | 18 | 48 | — | — | — | — | — | |
| Smith, Steve | (Canada) | D | 1988–1989 | 3 | 0 | 0 | 0 | 0 | — | — | — | — | — | |
| Snuggerud, Dave | (United States) | RW | 1989–1992 | 215 | 26 | 46 | 72 | 109 | 12 | 1 | 3 | 4 | 6 | |
| Sobotka, Vladimir | (Czech Republic) | C | 2018–2020 | 85 | 6 | 10 | 16 | 30 | — | — | — | — | — | |
| Spacek, Jaroslav | (Czech Republic) | D | 2006–2009 | 205 | 22 | 76 | 98 | 142 | 16 | 0 | 0 | 0 | 10 | |
| Spencer, Brian | (Canada) | LW | 1973–1977 | 240 | 42 | 72 | 114 | 206 | 31 | 1 | 4 | 5 | 12 | |
| Staal, Eric | (Canada) | C | 2020–2021 | 32 | 3 | 7 | 10 | 8 | — | — | — | — | — | |
| Stafford, Drew | (United States) | RW | 2006–2015 | 563 | 145 | 177 | 264 | 249 | 20 | 3 | 4 | 7 | 6 | |
| Stanfield, Fred | (Canada) | LW | 1974–1978 | 248 | 42 | 73 | 115 | 16 | 31 | 2 | 5 | 7 | 0 | |
| Stanley, Logan | (Canada) | D | 2025–2026 | 17 | 0 | 5 | 5 | 29 | 8 | 0 | 0 | 0 | 19 | |
| Stewart, Bill | (Canada) | D | 1977–1979 | 80 | 3 | 17 | 20 | 116 | 9 | 0 | 3 | 3 | 0 | |
| Strachan, Tyson | (Canada) | D | 2014–2015 | 46 | 0 | 5 | 5 | 44 | — | — | — | — | — | |
| Stewart, Chris | (Canada) | RW | 2013–2015 | 66 | 11 | 14 | 25 | 69 | — | — | — | — | — | |
| Stillman, Riley | (Canada) | D | 2022–2023 | 18 | 1 | 2 | 3 | 13 | — | — | — | — | — | |
| Stuart, Colin | (United States) | RW | 2010–2012 | 5 | 0 | 0 | 0 | 2 | — | — | — | — | — | |
| Suikkanen, Kai | (Finland) | LW | 1981–1983 | 2 | 0 | 0 | 0 | 0 | — | — | — | — | — | |
| Sulzer, Alexander | (Germany) | D | 2011–2014 | 57 | 6 | 8 | 14 | 22 | — | — | — | — | — | |
| Sutton, Ken | (Canada) | D | 1990–1995 | 232 | 18 | 60 | 78 | 215 | 25 | 3 | 4 | 7 | 16 | |
| Svoboda, Petr | (Czech Republic) | D | 1991–1995 | 139 | 5 | 49 | 54 | 260 | 10 | 1 | 4 | 5 | 10 | |
| Sweeney, Bob | (United States) | C | 1992–1995 | 185 | 37 | 44 | 81 | 230 | 14 | 2 | 2 | 4 | 12 | |
| Sylvester, Dean | (United States) | RW | 1998–1999 | 1 | 0 | 0 | 0 | 0 | 4 | 0 | 0 | 0 | 2 | |
| Szczechura, Paul | (Canada) | C | 2011–2012 | 9 | 1 | 3 | 4 | 4 | — | — | — | — | — | |
| Talbot, Jean-Guy | (Canada) | D | 1970–1971 | 57 | 0 | 7 | 7 | 36 | — | — | — | — | — | |
| Tallinder, Henrik | (Sweden) | D | 2001–2010 | 468 | 20 | 88 | 108 | 278 | 36 | 2 | 10 | 12 | 28 | |
| Tanti, Tony | (Canada) | LW | 1990–1992 | 80 | 16 | 23 | 39 | 106 | 12 | 2 | 3 | 5 | 12 | |
| Taylor, Chris | (Canada) | C | 1999–2001; 2002–2004 | 90 | 8 | 12 | 20 | 32 | 2 | 0 | 0 | 0 | 2 | |
| Tennyson, Matt | (United States) | D | 2017–2019 | 19 | 0 | 0 | 0 | 8 | — | — | — | — | — | |
| Terbenche, Paul | (Canada) | D | 1970–1974 | 121 | 2 | 19 | 21 | 20 | 6 | 0 | 0 | 0 | 0 | |
| Thomas, Scott | (United States) | RW | 1992–1994 | 39 | 3 | 3 | 6 | 23 | — | — | — | — | — | |
| Thompson, Tage | (United States) | C | 2018–2026 | 488 | 213 | 184 | 397 | 226 | 13 | 5 | 10 | 15 | 22 | |
| Thorburn, Chris | (Canada) | C | 2005–2006 | 2 | 0 | 1 | 1 | 7 | — | — | — | — | — | |
| Tidey, Alec | (Canada) | RW | 1976–1978 | 4 | 0 | 0 | 0 | 0 | 2 | 0 | 0 | 0 | 0 | |
| Timmins, Conor | (Canada) | D | 2025–2026 | 39 | 0 | 8 | 8 | 18 | 13 | 0 | 2 | 2 | 8 | |
| Titanic, Morris | (Canada) | LW | 1974–1976 | 19 | 0 | 0 | 0 | 0 | — | — | — | — | — | |
| Torres, Raffi | (United States) | LW | 2009–2010 | 14 | 0 | 5 | 5 | 2 | 4 | 0 | 2 | 2 | 12 | |
| Trapp, Doug | (Canada) | F | 1986–1987 | 2 | 0 | 0 | 0 | 0 | — | — | — | — | — | |
| Tropp, Corey | (United States) | C | 2011–2012 | 34 | 3 | 5 | 8 | 20 | — | — | — | — | — | |
| Tsygurov, Denis | (Russia) | D | 1993–1995 | 8 | 0 | 0 | 0 | 4 | — | — | — | — | — | |
| Tsyplakov, Vladimir | (Belarus) | LW | 1999–2001 | 70 | 13 | 20 | 33 | 20 | 14 | 1 | 1 | 2 | 8 | |
| Tuch, Alex | (United States) | RW | 2021–2026 | 360 | 139 | 170 | 309 | 192 | 13 | 4 | 3 | 7 | 8 | |
| Tucker, John | (Canada) | C | 1983–1991 | 345 | 116 | 154 | 270 | 142 | 17 | 9 | 11 | 20 | 18 | |
| Turgeon, Pierre | (Canada) | C | 1987–1992 | 322 | 122 | 201 | 323 | 119 | 23 | 12 | 13 | 25 | 14 | |
| Turnbull, Travis | (United States) | C | 2011–2012 | 3 | 1 | 0 | 1 | 5 | — | — | — | — | — | |
| Vaive, Rick | (Canada) | RW | 1988–1992 | 189 | 74 | 62 | 136 | 226 | 17 | 7 | 5 | 12 | 20 | |
| Van Boxmeer, John | (United States) | D | 1979–1983 | 294 | 49 | 166 | 215 | 239 | 35 | 5 | 14 | 19 | 35 | |
| Vanek, Thomas | (Austria) | LW | 2005–2014 | 598 | 254 | 243 | 497 | 362 | 36 | 15 | 5 | 20 | 18 | |
| Varada, Vaclav | (Czech Republic) | LW | 1995–2003 | 376 | 46 | 98 | 144 | 326 | 54 | 8 | 12 | 20 | 48 | |
| Varone, Phil | (Canada) | C | 2013–2016 | 42 | 5 | 4 | 9 | 16 | — | — | — | — | — | |
| Verret, Claude | (Canada) | C | 1983–1985 | 14 | 2 | 5 | 7 | 2 | — | — | — | — | — | |
| Vesey, Jimmy | (United States) | LW | 2019–2020 | 64 | 9 | 11 | 20 | 15 | — | — | — | — | — | |
| Virta, Hannu | (Finland) | D | 1981–1986 | 245 | 25 | 101 | 126 | 66 | 17 | 1 | 3 | 4 | 6 | |
| Walsh, Jim | (United States) | D | 1981–1982 | 4 | 0 | 1 | 1 | 4 | — | — | — | — | — | |
| Ward, Dixon | (Canada) | LW | 1995–2000 | 307 | 56 | 80 | 136 | 169 | 53 | 12 | 17 | 29 | 46 | |
| Warrener, Rhett | (Canada) | D | 1998–2003 | 266 | 9 | 33 | 42 | 363 | 38 | 1 | 5 | 6 | 38 | |
| Watson, Jim | (Canada) | D | 1970–1972 | 144 | 4 | 15 | 19 | 248 | — | — | — | — | — | |
| Weber, Mike | (United States) | D | 2007–2009; 2010–2016 | 341 | 9 | 44 | 53 | 409 | 7 | 0 | 1 | 1 | 6 | |
| Wells, Jay | (Canada) | D | 1989–1992 | 85 | 3 | 12 | 15 | 243 | 7 | 0 | 1 | 1 | 12 | |
| Whitmore, Derek | (United States) | LW | 2011–2012 | 2 | 0 | 0 | 0 | 0 | — | — | — | — | — | |
| Wiemer, Jim | (Canada) | D | 1982–1985 | 74 | 8 | 17 | 25 | 52 | 1 | 0 | 0 | 0 | 0 | |
| Wilson, Mike | (Canada) | D | 1995–1999 | 231 | 11 | 23 | 34 | 187 | 25 | 0 | 2 | 2 | 15 | |
| Wilson, Scott | (Canada) | C | 2017–2020 | 70 | 7 | 12 | 19 | 14 | — | — | — | — | — | |
| Wolanin, Christian | (Canada) | D | 2021–2022 | 1 | 0 | 0 | 0 | 0 | — | — | — | — | — | |
| Wood, Randy | (United States) | LW | 1991–1994 | 236 | 60 | 57 | 117 | 213 | 21 | 3 | 5 | 8 | 10 | |
| Woolley, Jason | (Canada) | D | 1997–2003 | 365 | 40 | 125 | 165 | 258 | 49 | 7 | 27 | 34 | 26 | |
| Wyrozub, Randy | (Canada) | C | 1970–1974 | 100 | 8 | 10 | 18 | 10 | — | — | — | — | — | |
| Zadorov, Nikita | (Russia) | D | 2013–2015 | 67 | 4 | 12 | 16 | 55 | — | — | — | — | — | |
| Zaine, Rod | (Canada) | C | 1971–1972 | 24 | 2 | 1 | 3 | 4 | — | — | — | — | — | |
| Zhitnik, Alexei | (Russia) | D | 1994–2004 | 712 | 55 | 234 | 289 | 822 | 70 | 6 | 21 | 27 | 138 | |
| Zubrus, Dainius | (Lithuania) | RW | 2006–2007 | 19 | 4 | 4 | 8 | 12 | 15 | 0 | 8 | 8 | 8 | |
| Zucker, Jason | (United States) | LW | 2024–2026 | 135 | 45 | 53 | 98 | 80 | 13 | 2 | 2 | 4 | 4 | |
