= List of Buffalo Sabres broadcasters =

The following is a chronological history of all local broadcasters of the Buffalo Sabres. Since 1997, radio and television broadcast production has been largely consolidated into the Sabres Hockey Network unit.

== Television ==
=== 2020s ===
Year	Channel	Play-by-play	Color commentator(s)	Rinkside	Studio host	Studio analyst
2024–25	MSG Western New York	Dan Dunleavy	Rob Ray; Martin Biron		Brian Duff; Howard Simon	Martin Biron Meghan Chayka
2023–24	MSG Western New York	Dan Dunleavy	Rob Ray; Martin Biron		Brian Duff	Martin Biron
2022–23	MSG Western New York	Dan Dunleavy	Rob Ray; Martin Biron		Brian Duff	Martin Biron
2021–22	MSG Western New York	Rick Jeanneret; Dan Dunleavy	Rob Ray; Martin Biron		Brian Duff; Dan Dunleavy	Martin Biron
2021	MSG Western New York	Rick Jeanneret; Dan Dunleavy	Rob Ray; Martin Biron		Brian Duff; Dan Dunleavy	Martin Biron

=== 2010s ===
Year	Channel	Play-by-play	Color commentator(s)	Rinkside	Studio host	Studio analyst
2019–2020	MSG Western New York	Rick Jeanneret; Dan Dunleavy	Rob Ray; Martin Biron		Brian Duff; Dan Dunleavy	Martin Biron
2018–19	MSG Western New York	Rick Jeanneret; Dan Dunleavy	Rob Ray; Martin Biron		Brian Duff; Dan Dunleavy	Martin Biron
2017–18	MSG Western New York	Rick Jeanneret; Dan Dunleavy	Rob Ray; Martin Biron		Brian Duff; Dan Dunleavy	Martin Biron
2016–17	MSG Western New York	Rick Jeanneret; Dan Dunleavy	Rob Ray; Martin Biron		Brian Duff; Dan Dunleavy	Brad May
2015–16	MSG Network	Rick Jeanneret; Dan Dunleavy	Rob Ray		Brian Duff	Brad May and Martin Biron
2014–15	MSG Network	Rick Jeanneret; Dan Dunleavy	Rob Ray		Brian Duff	Brad May and Martin Biron
2013–14	MSG Network	Rick Jeanneret; Dan Dunleavy	Rob Ray		Brian Duff	Brad May and Mike Robitaille
2012-13	MSG Network	Rick Jeanneret	Rob Ray		Brian Duff	Harry Neale and Mike Robitaille
2011–12	MSG Network (A team)	Rick Jeanneret	Harry Neale	Rob Ray	Kevin Sylvester	Mike Robitaille
2011–12	MSG Network (B team)	Kevin Sylvester	Danny Gare	Brian Duff	Brian Duff	Danny Gare
2010–11	MSG Network	Rick Jeanneret	Harry Neale	Rob Ray	Kevin Sylvester	Mike Robitaille

Note: The "A" team covers all home games and approximately one third of away games. The "B" team covers the remaining two-thirds of the away games. Games against the Rangers, Devils or Islanders feature their studio hosts instead of the Sabres'.

=== 2000s ===
Year	Channel	Play-by-play	Color commentator(s)	Rinkside reporter	Studio host	Studio analyst
2009–10	MSG Network	Rick Jeanneret	Harry Neale	Rob Ray	Kevin Sylvester	Mike Robitaille or Danny Gare
2008–09	MSG Network	Rick Jeanneret	Harry Neale	Rob Ray	Kevin Sylvester	Mike Robitaille
2007–08	MSG Network	Rick Jeanneret	Harry Neale	Rob Ray	Kevin Sylvester	Mike Robitaille
2006–07	MSG Network	Rick Jeanneret	Jim Lorentz	Rob Ray	Kevin Sylvester	Mike Robitaille
2005–06	MSG Network	Rick Jeanneret	Jim Lorentz	Rob Ray	Kevin Sylvester	Mike Robitaille
2004–05	No broadcasts due to 2004-05 NHL lockout					
2003–04	Empire Sports Network	Rick Jeanneret	Jim Lorentz	Rob Ray	Josh Mora	Mike Robitaille
2002–03	Empire Sports Network	Rick Jeanneret	Jim Lorentz	Danny Gare	Brian Blessing	Mike Robitaille
2001–02	Empire Sports Network	Rick Jeanneret	Jim Lorentz	Danny Gare	Brian Blessing	Mike Robitaille
2000–01	Empire Sports Network	Rick Jeanneret	Jim Lorentz	Danny Gare	Brian Blessing	Mike Robitaille

=== 1990s ===
Year	Channel	Play-by-play	Color commentator(s)	Rinkside reporter	Studio host	Studio analyst
1999–2000	Empire Sports Network	Rick Jeanneret	Jim Lorentz	Danny Gare	Brian Blessing	Mike Robitaille
1998–99	Empire Sports Network	Rick Jeanneret	Jim Lorentz	Danny Gare	Brian Blessing	Mike Robitaille
1997–98	Empire Sports Network	Rick Jeanneret	Jim Lorentz	Danny Gare	Brian Blessing	Mike Robitaille
1996–97	Empire Sports Network	Rick Jeanneret	Jim Lorentz	Dennis Williams	Dennis Williams (Pregame); Brian Blessing (Intermission)	Mike Robitaille (Intermission)
1996–97	WIVB-TV	Rick Jeanneret	Jim Lorentz	Dennis Williams	Dennis Williams (Pregame); Brian Blessing (Intermission)	Mike Robitaille (Intermission)
1995–96	Empire Sports Network	Rick Jeanneret	Jim Lorentz	Barry Buetel	Barry Buetel (Pregame), Brian Blessing (Intermission), and Jennifer Smith and Bob Koshinski (Postgame)	Mike Robitaille (Intermission)
1995–96	WUTV	Rick Jeanneret	Jim Lorentz	Barry Buetel	Barry Buetel (Pregame), Brian Blessing (Intermission), and Jennifer Smith and Bob Koshinski (Postgame)	Mike Robitaille (Intermission)
1994–95	Empire Sports Network	John Gurtler	Jim Lorentz		Mike Robitaille (Empire Only)	
1994–95	WUTV	John Gurtler	Jim Lorentz			
1993–94	Empire Sports Network	John Gurtler	Jim Lorentz		Mike Robitaille (Empire Only)	
1993–94	WUTV	John Gurtler	Jim Lorentz			
1992–93	Empire Sports Network	John Gurtler	Jim Lorentz		Mike Robitaille	
1992–93	WUTV	John Gurtler	Jim Lorentz		Brenda Brenon and Ted Darling	
1991–92	Empire Sports Network	Jim Lorentz (October–November); Ted Darling (December); John Gurtler (January–May)	Jim Lorentz and Mike Robitaille		Mike Robitaille	
1991–92	WUTV	Jim Lorentz (October–November); Ted Darling (December); John Gurtler (January–May)	Jim Lorentz and Mike Robitaille		Brenda Brenon	
1990–91	SportsChannel New York	Ted Darling	Mike Robitaille		John Gurtler	Mike Robitaille and Jim Lorentz
1990–91	WUTV	Ted Darling	Jim Lorentz		John Gurtler and Brenda Brenon	

=== 1980s ===
Year	Channel	Play-by-play	Color commentator(s)	Studio host	Studio analyst
1989–90	SportsChannel New York	Ted Darling	Mike Robitaille	John Gurtler	Danny Gare
1989–90	WNYB	Ted Darling	Jim Lorentz	John Gurtler	Mike Robitaille
1988-89	WGRZ-TV	Ted Darling	Jim Lorentz or Mike Robitaille	Ed Kilgore	
1987–88	WNYB	Ted Darling	Jim Lorentz or Mike Robitaille	Ed Kilgore	
1986–87	WGRZ-TV	Ted Darling	Jim Lorentz or Mike Robitaille	Ed Kilgore	
1985–86	WGRZ-TV	Ted Darling	Jim Lorentz or Mike Robitaille	Ed Kilgore	
1984–85	WGRZ-TV	Ted Darling	Jim Lorentz	Ed Kilgore	
1983–84	WGRZ-TV	Ted Darling	Jim Lorentz	Ed Kilgore	
1982–83	WGR-TV	Ted Darling	Paul Wieland and Jim Lorentz	Ed Kilgore	
1981–82	WGR-TV	Ted Darling	Paul Wieland and Jim Lorentz	Ed Kilgore	
1980–81	WGR-TV	Ted Darling	Paul Wieland and Jim Lorentz	Ed Kilgore	

=== 1970s ===
Year	Channel	Play-by-play	Color commentator	Studio host
1979–80	WGR-TV	Ted Darling	Pat Hannigan	Ed Kilgore
1978–79	WGR-TV	Ted Darling	Pat Hannigan	Ed Kilgore
1977–78	WKBW-TV	Ted Darling	Pat Hannigan	Rick Azar
1976–77	WKBW-TV	Ted Darling	Pat Hannigan	Rick Azar
1975–76	WKBW-TV	Ted Darling	Pat Hannigan	Rick Azar
1974–75	WKBW-TV	Ted Darling	Pat Hannigan	Rick Azar
1973–74	WKBW-TV	Ted Darling	Pat Hannigan	Rick Azar
1972–73	WKBW-TV	Ted Darling	Pat Hannigan	Rick Azar
1971–72	WKBW-TV	Ted Darling	Pat Hannigan	Rick Azar
1970–71	WKBW-TV	Dave Hodge and Rick Azar (seven away games)		

== Radio ==
=== 2020s ===
Year	Flagship	Play-by-play	Color commentator(s)	Studio host
2022–23	WGR	Dan Dunleavy	Rob Ray	Brian Koziol (Postgame); Mike Schopp, Chris Parker, or Brian Koziol (Pregame)
2021–22	WGR	Rick Jeanneret; Dan Dunleavy	Rob Ray; Martin Biron	Brian Koziol (Postgame); Mike Schopp, Chris Parker, or Brian Koziol (Pregame)
2021	WGR	Rick Jeanneret; Dan Dunleavy	Rob Ray; Martin Biron	Mike Schopp, Chris Parker, or Brian Koziol (Pregame); Brian Koziol (Postgame)

=== 2010s ===
Year	Flagship	Play-by-play	Color commentator(s)	Studio host
2019–2020	WGR	Rick Jeanneret; Dan Dunleavy	Rob Ray; Martin Biron	Brian Koziol (Postgame); Mike Schopp, Chris Parker, or Brian Koziol (Pregame)
2018–19	WGR	Rick Jeanneret; Dan Dunleavy	Rob Ray; Martin Biron	Mike Schopp, Chris Parker, or Brian Koziol (Pregame); Brian Koziol (Postgame)
2017–18	WGR	Rick Jeanneret; Dan Dunleavy	Rob Ray; Martin Biron	Mike Schopp, Chris Parker, or Brian Koziol (Pregame); Brian Koziol (Postgame)
2016–17	WGR	Rick Jeanneret; Dan Dunleavy	Rob Ray; Martin Biron	Mike Schopp, Chris Parker, or Brian Koziol (Pregame); Brian Koziol (Postgame)
2015–16	WGR (A team)	Rick Jeanneret	Rob Ray	Mike Schopp, Chris Parker, or Brian Koziol (Pregame); Brian Koziol (Postgame)
2015–16	WGR (B team)	Dan Dunleavy	Rob Ray	Mike Schopp, Chris Parker, or Brian Koziol (Pregame); Brian Koziol (Postgame)
2015–16	WGR (C team)	Brian Duff	Andrew Peters	Mike Schopp, Chris Parker, or Brian Koziol (Pregame); Brian Koziol (Postgame)
2014–15	WGR	Rick Jeanneret; Dan Dunleavy	Rob Ray	Mike Schopp, Chris Parker, or Brian Koziol (Pregame); Brian Koziol (Postgame)
2013–14	WGR	Rick Jeanneret; Dan Dunleavy	Rob Ray	Mike Schopp, Chris Parker, or Brian Koziol (Pregame); Brian Koziol (Postgame)
2012–13	WGR	Rick Jeanneret	Rob Ray	Mike Schopp, Chris Parker, or Brian Koziol (Pregame); Brian Koziol (Postgame)
2011–12	WGR (A team)	Rick Jeanneret	Harry Neale	Mike Schopp, Chris Parker, or Brian Koziol (Pregame); Brian Koziol (Postgame)
2011–12	WGR (B team)	Kevin Sylvester	Danny Gare	Mike Schopp, Chris Parker, or Brian Koziol (Pregame); Brian Koziol (Postgame)
2010–11	WGR	Rick Jeanneret	Harry Neale	Brian Koziol (Postgame) and Mike Schopp, Chris Parker or Brian Koziol (Pregame)

=== 2000s ===
Year	Station	Play-by-play	Color commentator(s)	Studio host(s)
2009–10	WGR	Rick Jeanneret	Harry Neale	Mike Schopp, Chris Parker, or Brian Koziol (Pregame); Brian Koziol (Postgame)
2008–09	WGR	Rick Jeanneret	Harry Neale	Mike Schopp, Chris Parker, or Brian Koziol (Pregame); Brian Koziol (Postgame)
2007–08	WGR	Rick Jeanneret	Harry Neale or Mike Robitaille	Mike Schopp, Chris Parker, or Brian Koziol (Pregame); Brian Koziol (Postgame)
2006–07	WGR	Rick Jeanneret	Jim Lorentz	Mike Schopp, Chris Parker, or Brad Riter (Pregame); Brad Riter (Postgame)
2005–06	WGR	Rick Jeanneret	Jim Lorentz	Mike Schopp, Chris Parker, or Brad Riter (Pregame); Brad Riter (Postgame)
2004–05	No broadcasts due to 2004-05 NHL lockout			
2003–04	WNSA	Rick Jeanneret	Jim Lorentz	Josh Mora and Mike Robitaille
2002–03	WNSA	Rick Jeanneret	Jim Lorentz	Brian Blessing and Mike Robitaille
2001–02	WNSA	Rick Jeanneret	Jim Lorentz	Brian Blessing and Mike Robitaille
2000–01	WNSA	Rick Jeanneret	Jim Lorentz	Brian Blessing and Mike Robitaille

=== 1990s ===
Year	Station	Play-by-play	Color commentator(s)	Studio hosts
1999–2000	WHTT-FM	Rick Jeanneret	Jim Lorentz	Brian Blessing and Mike Robitaille
1998–99	WHTT-FM	Rick Jeanneret	Jim Lorentz	Tom Schuh 1st half of season and Mark Jeanneret 2nd half of season
1997–98	WHTT-FM	Rick Jeanneret	Jim Lorentz	Brian Blessing and Mike Robitaille
1996–97	WHTT-FM	Pete Weber	Danny Gare	Dave Miller
1995–96	WWKB-AM	Pete Weber	Danny Gare	Dave Miller
1994–95	WGR	Rick Jeanneret	Larry Playfair	Barry Buetel
1993–94	WGR	Rick Jeanneret	Larry Playfair	Barry Buetel
1992–93	WGR	Rick Jeanneret	Larry Playfair	Pete Weber
1991–92	WGR	Rick Jeanneret	Danny Gare	Pete Weber
1990–91	WGR	Rick Jeanneret	Danny Gare	Pete Weber

=== 1980s ===
Year	Station	Play-by-play	Studio host
1989–90	WBEN	Rick Jeanneret	Pete Weber
1988–89	WBEN	Rick Jeanneret	Pete Weber
1987–88	WBEN	Rick Jeanneret	Pete Weber
1986–87	WBEN	Rick Jeanneret	Pete Weber
1985–86	WBEN	Rick Jeanneret	
1984–85	WBEN	Rick Jeanneret	
1983–84	WBEN	Rick Jeanneret	
1982–83	WGR	Rick Jeanneret	
1981–82	WGR	Rick Jeanneret	
1980–81	WGR	Rick Jeanneret	

=== 1970s ===
Year	Station	Play-by-play	Studio host
1979–80	WGR	Rick Jeanneret	
1978–79	WGR	Rick Jeanneret	
1977–78	WGR	Rick Jeanneret	
1976–77	WGR	Rick Jeanneret	
1975–76	WGR	Rick Jeanneret	
1974–75	WGR	Rick Jeanneret	
1973–74	WGR	Rick Jeanneret	
1972–73	WGR	Rick Jeanneret	
1971–72	WGR	Rick Jeanneret	
1970–71	WGR	Ted Darling	Phil Soisson (home games)

== Substitutes ==
=== Play-by-Play ===
- Kevin Sylvester (2008–16)
- Dan Dunleavy (2009–present)
- Curt Keilback (2008–09)
- Paul Hamilton (2008–09)
- Jim Lorentz (1990–2007)
- Mark Jeanneret (2010–11)
- Don Stevens (January 21, 1992 @ St Louis)

=== Color commentary ===
- Mike Robitaille (?-2014)
- Andrew Peters (2016–present)
- Martin Biron (2016–present)

== See also ==
- List of current National Hockey League broadcasters
