= Sabres Hockey Network =

Radio network and production company

- Type: Radio network
- Country: United States
- First air date: 1970
- Availability: Various AM and FM radio stations
- Headquarters: Buffalo, New York
- Broadcast area: Western New York; Central New York; Northwest Pennsylvania
- Owner: Audacy, Inc. Buffalo Sabres
- Official website: Buffalo Sabres Online

The Sabres Hockey Network is the official radio network and production company of the Buffalo Sabres of the National Hockey League (NHL). The network is currently operated jointly by the Sabres and Audacy, Inc.

Rick Jeanneret was the network's primary play-by-play voice and served in that capacity from 1971 to 2022, Dan Dunleavy has taken his place since then, with Rob Ray currently serving as color commentator. In the 2008–2009 season, former Winnipeg Jets/Phoenix Coyotes broadcaster Curt Keilback covered for Jeanneret during the team's western road trip. Mark Jeanneret also called a couple games. In the 2009–2010 season, the Sabres did not send their television broadcast crew on the western road trip and used the local broadcasts of the Phoenix Coyotes, Anaheim Ducks, Los Angeles Kings and Vancouver Canucks as the "home" broadcast. Jeanneret and then color commentator Harry Neale had reduced duties for 2011–2012, with the duo only handling home games and a third of the road games; Kevin Sylvester and Danny Gare handled the broadcasts of the remaining games that season.

The radio network's postgame show is hosted by WGR personality Brian Koziol. Mike Schopp and Chris "Bulldog" Parker host the pre-game show, which airs only on WGR. On television, a pregame show and postgame show are broadcast, and hosted by Brian Duff and Martin Biron. (Prior to 2005, the television pregame-postgame shows were simulcast on radio. The postgame was known as Hockey Hotline and hosted by Mike Robitaille, first with host Brian Blessing and then Josh Mora.)

The theme song for broadcasts has been the "Sabre Dance" by Aram Khachaturian since the team's debut. From the 2006 Stanley Cup Playoffs through the 2009–10 season, the team used for its main theme an instrumental cut of "Hurricane 2000," an orchestral arrangement of the song "Rock You Like a Hurricane" recorded by Scorpions and the Berlin Philharmonic Orchestra on the album Moment of Glory. From the 1990s through 2006 the team used a custom-made theme. Beginning shortly after Terry Pegula's acquisition of the team, the song was changed back to "Sabre Dance." For the 2011–12 season, a hard-rock version of "Sabre Dance" rotates with MSG Network's standard hockey theme as the theme for the Sabres Hockey Network broadcasts.

Following the end of the Sabres' partnership with Audacy in 2026 and its initial indication that Good Karma would take over its affiliate operations, the team expressed interest in continuing providing Sabres games to the Audacy stations and that it was not following the same business model it used for the Buffalo Bills Radio Network, in which it moved that team's games to a network of Cumulus Media, iHeartMedia and Seven Mountains Media-owned stations across New York and Pennsylvania. The team stated it was still in negotiations with WGR and Audacy as the "incumbent" to renew the station's Sabres affiliation. On September 3, 2026, the Sabres and WGR announced a multiyear extension keeping the team on WGR through at least the next two seasons, and that Audacy (and not Good Karma) would continue to manage the team's radio network.

== Affiliates ==
=== Current stations ===
City of License	Station	Frequency	Notes
Buffalo, New York	WGR	550 AM	Flagship station of the team from 1970–71 to 1982–83 seasons, the 1990–91 to 1994–95 seasons, and again since the 2005–06 season.
Wethersfield, New York	WGR-FM	107.7 FM	Former flagship station of the Buffalo Sabres from the 2000–01 season until the 2003–04 season. Station sold to Entercom in May 2004 following the Adelphia Communications scandal. Sabres' broadcasts returned on 107.7 FM in April 2011 during the team's playoff series that year, and again since February 2026 when Audacy introduced an FM simulcast of WGR.
Rochester, New York	WCMF-FM	96.5 FM	
Rochester, New York	WROC	950 AM	Station only used when not in conflict with Rochester Americans games. Cross-branded with the WGR identity since February 2026.
Salamanca/Olean, New York	WQRS	98.3 FM	
Batavia, New York	WBTA	1490 AM	
Russell, Pennsylvania	WQFX-FM	103.1 FM	Station serves the Jamestown, New York/Warren, Pennsylvania area.
Dunkirk, New York	WDOE	1410 AM	
Elmira, New York	WPGO	820 AM	
Calcium/Watertown, New York	WOTT-FM	94.1 FM	
Ogdensburg, New York	WQTK	92.7 FM	

=== Former stations ===
City of License	Station	Frequency	Notes
Buffalo, New York	WBEN	930 AM	Former flagship station of the Buffalo Sabres from the 1983–84 season until the 1989–1990 season, and co-flagship during the 2011 playoffs. Station is still occasionally used for Sabres broadcasts when WGR has a schedule conflict with Buffalo Bills games.
Buffalo, New York	WWKB	1520 AM	Former flagship station of the Buffalo Sabres for the 1995–96 season only. Station is still occasionally used for Sabres broadcasts when WGR has a schedule conflict with Buffalo Bills games, particularly for lower-priority content such as preseason and prospect games.
Buffalo, New York	WHTT-FM	104.1 FM	Former flagship station of the Buffalo Sabres from the 1996–97 season until the 1999–2000 season.

== Television ==
The Sabres Hockey Network has produced Sabres games since the team's days on the Empire Sports Network; Empire and the Sabres were both under the control of John Rigas from 1996 until Rigas's arrest in 2003. Prior to the launch of the Empire Sports Network, Sabres telecasts were managed under the brand Niagara Frontier Sports Network and syndicated to local television stations. NFSN briefly owned the station now known as WNYO-TV in the late 1980s but sold off that station after a short time after it became clear that scrambled subscription over-the-air television (a proposition that NFSN had planned on being its primary business model) was not going to be a viable enterprise and launched the cable- and satellite-exclusive Empire Sports Network instead.

On September 10, 2016, MSG launched a Buffalo-centric version of MSG Network called MSG Western New York, which incorporates content from both the Sabres and the Buffalo Bills including 70 Sabres games. The play-by-play and commentary is radio simulcasted over video, an arrangement unique in the National Hockey League. The other 12 games air only on the radio network, including all games broadcast on the league's national outlets. In New York City and the surrounding areas, Sabres games against the New York Rangers, New York Islanders or New Jersey Devils (other hockey teams to which MSG owns TV rights) have usually carried the Sabres Hockey Network feed on the SAP of MSG or MSG Plus. The Sabres also have the capabilities to broadcast preseason home games on the team's Web site.

MSG Western New York is carried on DirecTV, channel 635-1. The network is also available on Charter Spectrum, the predominant cable provider in New York State. The channel is available on Verizon FiOS, with high-definition feeds only arriving in late 2011 after a protracted legal dispute in which MSG refused to provide Verizon with an HD feed. The channel and therefore most Sabres games are not available on Dish Network due to a years-long continuing carriage dispute between the Dish and MSG Networks.

In Canada, Sabres games were previously available in the Niagara Region through Bell TV. As of November 2026, FuboTV holds the Sabres' regional rights in this area under sublicense from MSG.

The practice of syndicating games to a local broadcast station has happened only once since MSG took over the broadcast contract: WGRZ and WHEC-TV were given rights to simulcast MSG's coverage of the February 11, 2012 game between the Sabres and the Tampa Bay Lightning, as a one-time goodwill gesture in the ongoing dispute between Time Warner Cable and MSG; the two sides had an approximately 1 1/2-month contract dispute that left games unavailable on cable for most of the state.

Games carried by TNT, TBS, ESPN, ABC, and Canadian television are not produced by the Sabres, and these television broadcasts are not considered to be part of the Sabres Hockey Network. The network produces "radio only" broadcasts for its terrestrial affiliates when a game airs on U.S. national television.

== Personalities, past and present ==
Current:

- Martin Biron, studio analyst
- Brian Duff, TV studio host and occasional radio play-by-play announcer
- Dan Dunleavy, play-by-play
- Rob Ray, color commentator
- Meghan Chayka, statistician (select games)
- Ralph Hass, voiceovers

Past:

- Ted Darling, TV play-by-play (1970–1991)
- Danny Gare, studio analyst/color commentator
- John Gurtler, TV play-by-play (1991–1995)
- Dave Hodge, radio play-by-play (1970–1971)
- Rick Jeanneret, TV and radio play-by-play (1971–2022)
- Jim Lorentz, color commentator (1981–2007)
- Brad May, studio analyst (2014–2017)
- Josh Mora, studio host
- Harry Neale, color commentator (2008-2013)
- Mike Robitaille, color commentator and studio analyst (1989–2014)
- Kevin Sylvester, host of Hockey Hotline on WGR, studio host and substitute play-by-play (2005–2016)
- Pete Weber, radio play-by-play (1995–1997)

== Miscellaneous notes ==
The Sabres radio network also simulcasts Schopp and the Bulldog to WROC in Rochester.

The Rochester situation is unique in that a different station carries regular season games than in the postseason. This is because WROC has a much weaker AM signal, and the network switched to FM station WBZA to maximize coverage during the postseason. In 2008, with Entercom's purchase of WCMF, Sabres games moved to that station instead.

Since 1997, the radio play-by-play has been simulcast on the station's cable partner (Empire Sports Network from 1997 to 2004, and MSG Network/MSG Western New York from 2005 to the present). Prior to this, Ted Darling was the team's television play-by-play voice, though he was forced to retire due to Pick's disease in 1991. John Gurtler did TV play-by-play from 1991 to 1995, and Rick Jeanneret took over those duties from that point, adding radio simulcasts in 1997. Unlike most shows on MSG Network, the Sabres control all television broadcasts of their games.

== See also ==
- MSG Western New York, the TV broadcaster of the Sabres
- List of Buffalo Sabres broadcasters
