= MSG Western New York =

- Type: Regional sports network
- Country: United States
- Broadcast area: Western New York; Northwestern Pennsylvania; Central New York (select programming); Nationwide (via satellite)
- Headquarters: New York City; Buffalo, New York

Programming
- Language: English
- Picture format: 1080i (HDTV); 480i (SDTV)

Ownership
- Owner: Sphere Entertainment; Hockey Western New York LLC
- Sister channels: MSG Network; MSG Sportsnet

History
- Launched: September 10, 2016; 10 years ago
- Replaced: MSG Network (Zone 3- Western New York only); Empire Sports Network

Links
- Website: www.msgnetworks.com

Availability

Streaming media
- MSG+ on DAZN: www.dazn.com/en-US/welcome/msgplusyes (Requires a DAZN account or existing Gotham Sports account, and a login from participating providers or a subscription to stream content. This channel is only available on the service for those living in the restricted area)
- DirecTV Stream: 635-1
- FuboTV: Available within designated area

MSG Western New York (MSG WNY) is an American regional sports network that is a joint venture between Sphere Entertainment (a company spun off from Madison Square Garden Entertainment) and Hockey Western New York LLC. The channel (also on occasion credited as Pegula Sports Network or MSG Buffalo) is a sub-feed of MSG Network, with programming oriented towards the Western New York region, including coverage of the National Hockey League's Buffalo Sabres and the National Football League's Buffalo Bills. It replaced MSG Network on television providers in the Sabres' media market in 2016.

MSG Western New York is available on cable providers throughout Western New York. Most programming is available nationwide on satellite via DirecTV.

== History ==
After the collapse of Empire Sports Network and its parent Adelphia, MSG bought the rights to the Buffalo Sabres in 2006 under a 10-year deal; where telecasts are controlled by the team via the Sabres Hockey Network, including the sale of advertising, and the simulcast of Rick Jeanneret's commentary on both radio and television (although, during the 2015–16 season, the team experimented with having separate commentary teams on radio and television for selected games, which the Buffalo News speculated was in preparation for Jeanneret's eventual retirement), conditions that the Sabres always made as part of their telecast deals going back to the days of Empire. After acquiring the rights, MSG divided its network into three regional broadcast "zones"; Sabres games were available within "Zone 3", which covered Buffalo and Rochester, and "Zone 2", the remainder of the state excluding Buffalo, Rochester, and New York City—which was shared by the Sabres, Devils, Islanders, and Rangers. The exact channel assignment for Sabres games varied by region (some games were carried by FSN New York in Zone 2), but all games were carried on the main MSG Network service within Zone 3.

The Buffalo Sabres' regional television ratings are among the highest in the league; in the 2015–16 season, despite the team's poor overall performance, fan enthusiasm over star prospect Jack Eichel helped the team achieve the highest average regional viewership of all NHL teams for the first time since 2008-09, with a 6.55 share. National telecasts on NBC and NBCSN also had notably high ratings in Buffalo.

It was speculated that Pegula Sports and Entertainment, which had recently bought the Sabres, Rochester Americans, Buffalo Bandits and Buffalo Bills, was planning to take advantage of the high viewership by establishing a team-owned regional sports network once the Sabres' existing television contract with MSG expired. Bob Koshinski, who had managed Empire Sports Network for most of its existence, stated in 2020 that Pegula had seriously considered reviving Empire, but that MSG had offered $18,000,000 in guaranteed annual money to stay with them, money that Pegula was unwilling to turn down. The Buffalo News' Alan Pergament also acknowledged the impending end of the Sabres and Bills' radio contracts with WGR as a possibility that the group could, potentially, acquire a radio station to serve as a team-owned radio outlet if it is unable to renew its contract with Entercom (Entercom had purchased the Sabres' previous owned-and-operated station, 107.7 WNSA, in 2004, and merged its remaining programming onto WGR). Pegula eventually secured a contract extension with Entercom keeping the Bills and Sabres on WGR through the spring of 2021. However, in regards to television, he felt that it was more likely for Pegula to partner with MSG to form a full-time, Buffalo-specific feed of MSG Network with additional local programming, rather than actually establishing a new, standalone outlet.

Basically, what we have done is create our own platform, which is stronger because we already have the distribution on MSG, we have the benefit of MSG programming on there and the benefit of the platform of producing as much programming as we feel comfortable.

— Mark Preisler

On June 20, 2016, Pegula announced that it had entered into a joint venture with MSG to establish a new service known as MSG Western New York. The channel, a sub-feed of MSG Network took over the former MSG Zone 3/Sabres game only channel, replacing the parent channel within the Sabres existing television market—which was also, notably, expanded to include the entirety of Rochester. The arrangement allows Pegula access to MSG's existing distribution and statewide programming, while allowing opt-outs for an expanded slate of local programming dedicated to the Bills and Sabres, which is produced and controlled by Pegula. MSG as part of the agreement pays $19 to $20 million per-year in rights fees to broadcast Sabres games and programming, as well as Buffalo Bills programming; it is nearly double the value of the previous Sabres deal. As with the previous deal, Pegula controls team programming on the network, including advertising sales and production (which is handled through PSE's production wing PicSix Creative), and receives all advertising revenue, while MSG collects the retransmission consent fee. Besides original programming and broadcasts exclusive to MSG WNY, the network also carries selected programming from the main MSG Network channel.

Pegula's executive vice president of media and content Mark Preisler explained that the deal was an alternative to establishing a new regional sports network from scratch, as the company would be able to expand on its relationship with MSG as a long-standing partner by leveraging its infrastructure and distribution, rather than needing to invest in building a network and negotiating carriage with television providers.

The first promos seen for the channel ran during a Bills preseason game against the Indianapolis Colts on August 13, 2016 promoting its Bills programming. The channel debuted on September 10, 2016 at 8:00pm with a Western New York cut in showing the 2016 debut of The Rex Ryan Show and a special behind the scenes feature called Rex and Rob Reunited at 8:30 and 9pm, the daily feed followed on October 3.

On April 4, 2017, news broke that James L. Dolan, controlling owner of MSG, was exploring the sale of his regional sports networks, including his share of MSG Western New York.

On August 28, 2023, Pegula Sports and Entertainment was dissolved, with the Bills and Hockey Western New York LLC (the holding company that owns the Sabres, Americans and Bandits) becoming separate business entities and Terry Pegula assuming Presidency of the Sabres organization.

On August 28, 2024, MSG Networks, along with the YES Network announced a combined streaming app for their teams called the Gotham Sports App. Their television rights are not affected.

In February 2026, Bills studio programming such as One Bills Live became exclusive to MSG Western New York after Pegula severed ties with WGR and brought its radio broadcasts in-house; eventual plans will also bring Sabres Live under the same terms once the Sabres' season ends. One Bills Live is offered to Buffalo Bills Radio Network stations (produced in partnership with Good Karma Brands) and via a webstream for non-MSG subscribers.

== Programming ==
The network carries team programming related to the Buffalo Sabres and Buffalo Bills; the former including all 70 regional Sabres games and the latter including local Bills shows formerly aired by WKBW-TV; preseason telecasts began to be simulcast with WKBW beginning in 2017. In addition, the channel simulcasts The Instigators (formerly known as Sabres Hockey Hotline) and One Bills Live (formerly known as The John Murphy Show) from WGR radio as part of a five-hour weekday block, originating from studios (dubbed the One Buffalo studios) at Highmark Stadium; Murphy's program was moved from the evening to the afternoon and had a co-host added. As an aspect of the overall deal, PSE agreed in principle to extend its radio rights with WGR.

MSG Western New York added a package of five Rochester Americans contests beginning in December 2016, moving the team's television broadcasts to MSG WNY from the moribund Time Warner Cable Sports Channel. Select away playoff games are aired by the channel if the team is playing in a market where the home team has a television partner to simulcast from such as Leafs Nation Network for the Toronto Marlies. On September 7, 2017, it was announced that the channel would begin airing select Monsignor Martin Athletic Association high school football games produced by Pegula as part of a multi-year deal, including a three-game showcase at New Era Field. The high school coverage moved exclusively online for 2018. The remainder of MSG WNY's schedule consists of programming from the main MSG Network schedule, such as New York Knicks basketball. In turn, MSG also has rights to air the Pegula-produced original programming and game converge on its other networks.

In 2018, MSG-produced Bills preseason telecasts moved to the stations of Nexstar Media Group in all media markets outside Buffalo. As the Bills could not break their existing contract with WKBW in Buffalo, the rights in that city did not change until 2021, when Nexstar-owned WIVB-TV would begin carrying the games.

=== Hockey ===
- Beyond Blue & Gold — a periodical Sabres magazine show that debuted in 2013
- The Instigators — daily talk show co-hosted by Andrew Peters and Craig Rivet with regular contributor Martin Biron; simulcast on WGR (formerly known as Sabres Hockey Hotline, Tuesday through Friday)
- Sabres Showdown — short-form penalty shootout knockout tournament featuring Sabres stars, based on the 1970s-era NHL on NBC/Hockey Night in Canada feature of the same name
- Sabres Live — daily talk show co-hosted by Martin Biron and Brian Duff; simulcast on WGR

=== Football ===
- A weekly coach's show co-hosted by the Bills head coach (Joe Brady as of 2026)
- Bills All-Access — weekly half-hour newsmagazine
- Bills Tonight — weekly postgame show
- One Bills Live — daily talk show co-hosted by Chris Brown and Steve Tasker; simulcast on WGR (formerly known as The John Murphy Show)
- Top 10 in Bills History — countdown miniseries; debuted June 12, 2017
- The Extra Point — Monday radio show simulcast with WGR
- Buffalo Bills: Embedded — Documentary series covering the Bills training camp; debuted August 2018, created by MSG WNY for Facebook Watch

=== Bowling ===
- Beat the Champ — Bowling competition; added September 2024, after eight years on WBBZ-TV

== On-air staff ==
=== Current on-air staff ===
==== Football ====
- Chris Brown — contributor to Bills All Access, co-host of One Bills Live and high school play-by-play
- Ruben Brown — analyst for Bills Tonight
- Thad Brown — preseason sideline reporter
- Sal Capaccio — host of The Extra Point
- Andrew Catalon — Bills preseason play-by-play (rotating)
- Cynthia Frelund — Bills sideline reporter
- Maddy Glab — host of Bills Tonight
- Fred Jackson — analyst for Bills Tonight
- Len Jankiewicz — high school color commentary
- Rob Stone — Bills preseason play-by-play (rotating)
- Steve Tasker — host of Bills All Access, co-host of One Bills Live and Bills preseason color commentator
- George Wilson — Bills studio analyst

==== Hockey ====
- Martin Biron – Sabres studio analyst, co-host of Sabres Live
- Meghan Chayka - Sabres studio analyst (select games)
- Griffin Della Penna - Amerks play-by-play
- Brian Duff – Sabres studio host, co-host of Sabres Live
- Dan Dunleavy – Sabres play- by-play announcer
- Danny Gare – Sabres fill-in analyst
- Rob Ray – Sabres color analyst
- Ric Seiling – Amerks color analyst

==== Bowling ====
- Paul Peck – play-by-play for Beat the Champ
- Sue Nawojski – color analyst for Beat the Champ

=== Former on-air staff ===
- Mike Catalana — various roles
- Rick Jeanneret – Sabres play-by-play announcer
- Donald Jones – co-host of The John Murphy Show
- Brad May – Sabres studio analyst
- John Murphy — host of One Bills Live and The Sean McDermott Show
- Andrew Peters – co-host of The Instigators
- Craig Rivet – co-host of The Instigators
- Don Stevens – Amerks play-by-play announcer

== Carriage ==
=== Cable television ===
Both of the two primary cable providers in Western New York, Spectrum (formerly Time Warner Cable, which covers the vast majority of the state) and Atlantic Broadband (which covers a small portion of Cattaraugus County) have carried the network from its inception.

=== DirecTV ===
On August 10, 2016, the debut night of MSG Western New York it was revealed that DirecTV would not be running the network's full programming schedule. The Sabres noted that MSG made the programming available to DirecTV but the provider was not willing to carry it. This made MSG WNY a part-time channel on DirecTV with the provider continuing to air the channel as a game only service showing Sabres games only. For the 2017 NFL season, DirecTV began showing Bills All Access and irregularly showing the first runs of The Sean McDermott Show and Bills Tonight in addition to the Sabres games that the channel airs. A week later DirecTV began showing The Instigators and The John Murphy Show.

=== Dish Network ===
MSG Western New York, like MSG and MSG Sportsnet, is unavailable on Dish Network. As part of an ongoing feud with the family of Charles Dolan (owners of MSG), Dish has not carried any MSG network channel since the last agreement expired on October 1, 2010.

=== Over-the-top services ===
FuboTV added the MSG networks for the fall 2017 season.

MSG launched a standalone over-the-top service MSG+, which included MSG Western New York within the Sabres' broadcast territory, in 2023. It was later merged into Gotham Sports, a joint venture with MSG and YES Network, some time in 2025. On July 29, 2026, the Sabres announced that the Gotham Sports app would be discontinued as DAZN had acquired its assets and rights portfolio.

== See also ==
- Sabres Hockey Network
- Buffalo Bills Radio Network
- Spectrum Sports
- MSG Sportsnet
