= WGR =

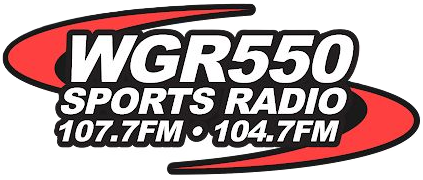
- Buffalo, New York; United States
- Broadcast area: Buffalo–Niagara Falls metropolitan area
- Frequency: 550 kHz
- Branding: WGR 550 Sports Radio

Programming
- Language: English
- Format: Sports radio
- Affiliations: BetMGM Network; Buffalo Sabres; Westwood One Sports

Ownership
- Owner: Audacy, Inc.; (Audacy License, LLC)
- Sister stations: WGR-FM; WBEN; WKSE; WWKB; WWWS; WROC

History
- First air date: May 21, 1922
- Former frequencies: 833 & 619 kHz (1922–1923); 833 kHz (1923); 940 kHz (1923–1927); 990 kHz (1927–1928)

Technical information
- Licensing authority: FCC
- Facility ID: 56101
- Class: B
- Power: 5,000 watts
- Transmitter coordinates: 42°46′11.2″N 78°50′36.1″W
- Repeaters: 107.7 WGR-FM (Wethersfield, New York); 104.7 W284AP (Buffalo); 98.5 WKSE-HD2 (Niagara Falls)

Links
- Public license information: Public file; LMS
- Webcast: Listen live (via Audacy); Listen live (via iHeartRadio)
- Website: www.audacy.com/wgr550

WGR (550 kHz) is a commercial AM radio station licensed to serve Buffalo, New York. Owned by Audacy, Inc., its studios and offices are located on Corporate Parkway in Amherst, and the transmitter site—used by WGR and co-owned WWKB—is in Hamburg. Programming is also heard on FM on WGR-FM, extending the station's listening area to Batavia and Rochester, New York, and on an HD Radio digital subchannel of WKSE.

== Programming ==
WGR has a sports radio format. The station targets a key demographic of men 25 to 54 years old. It had the highest Nielsen ratings of any station in the Buffalo market among that demographic as of autumn 2018.

Jeremy White hosts the morning-drive show with Joe DiBiase, followed by The Extra Point Show.

Mike Schopp hosts the afternoon-drive home with Chris "Bulldog" Parker. Evenings feature an encore broadcast of Sabres Live with Brian Duff and Martin Biron, produced by the Buffalo Sabres, on nights when the station has no play-by-play content to broadcast.

WGR serves as the flagship outlet for: the Sabres Hockey Network, with Dan Dunleavy and Rob Ray calling games on-site; and the professional box lacrosse Buffalo Bandits, with John Gurtler and Randy Mearns calling games on-site. MSG Western New York also uses this feed as the announcers for the game.

== History ==
=== Early years ===
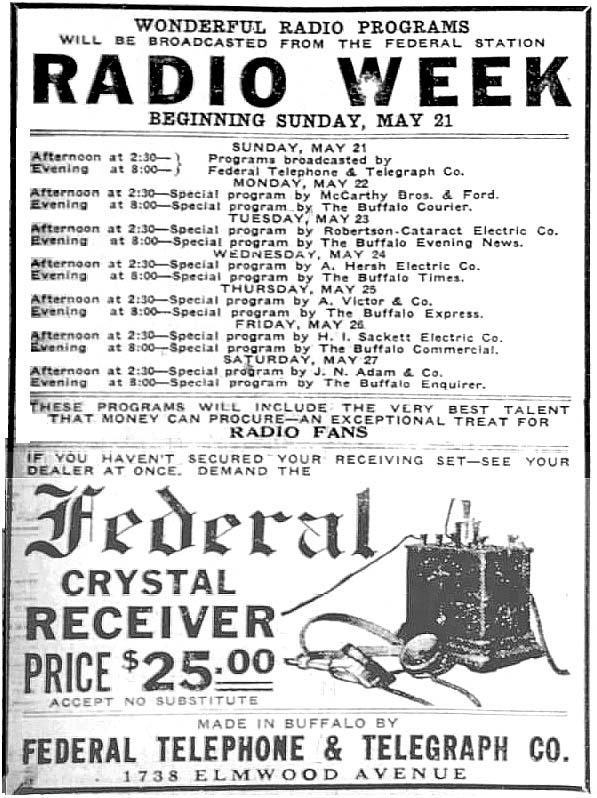
WGR debuted a higher power transmitter and special programming on May 21, 1922, at the start of "Radio Week".

WGR was the first commercial radio station in Western New York. It was preceded by amateur radio operator Charles Klinck's short-lived 1920 station, in addition to sporadic experimental stations in the 1910s

Effective December 1, 1921, the Department of Commerce, which regulated U.S. radio at this time, adopted regulations formally defining "broadcasting stations". The wavelength of 360 meters (833 kHz) was designated for entertainment broadcasts, while 485 meters (619 kHz) was reserved for broadcasting official weather and other government reports. The Buffalo Daily Courier and Enquirer (both owned by William J. Conners) were issued a temporary authorization for 360 meters, with the call sign WPU, for a concert on January 22, 1922. This broadcast employed apparatus "furnished by the Federal Telephone & Telegraph Co."

In early 1922, Federal, headquartered in North Buffalo, began producing radio receivers. As part of its marketing efforts, the company decided to apply for its own broadcasting license for Buffalo's first non-temporary radio broadcasting station. The license was issued on March 14, 1922, with the randomly assigned call letters WGR, transmitting on both 360 and 485 meters. The March 28 issue of the Buffalo Evening News reported hearing test transmissions made by WGR the previous night. On April 1 it was announced that, starting that day, WGR would broadcast weather reports provided by the Department of Navigation on 485 meters each weekday at 12:30 and 6:00 pm. In mid-April, WGR's regular broadcast schedule was reported to be musical programs sent on 360 meters on Tuesday and Thursday evenings and Sunday afternoons, plus daily weather and market reports on 485 meters.

WGR suspended regular operations while company employees worked on constructing a more powerful transmitter that could be easily heard by the crystal radios the company was selling. In May they were reported to be conducting test transmissions, initially as experimental station 8XAD. The debut for WGR's use of the upgraded transmitter was scheduled for May 21, an event that was described as the "formal opening of one of the largest and most powerful broadcasting stations in the east which may make Buffalo the ethereal center of this part of the country", because "The arrangements and furnishing of the station will be equal to that of any of the present stations of national fame." The starting date coincided with the first day of "Radio Week" in Buffalo. The May 21 broadcast opened with prayer by Rev. Michael J. Ahren, president of Canisius College, followed by a talk by the dean of the University of Buffalo's college of arts and sciences, Julian Park, on the possibilities of education, Rev. F. Hyatt Smith, Kenmore Presbyterian Church speaking about the nature of "success", and Albert Kinsey, Chamber of Commerce president, reviewing the financial future of Buffalo. This was followed by entertainment by local artists.

In early 1923 WGR ended the government reports on 485 meters, although it continued making entertainment broadcasts on 360 meters. In September 1922 the Department of Commerce set aside a second entertainment wavelength, 400 meters (750 kHz) for "Class B" stations that had quality equipment and programming. In May 1923 additional "Class B" frequencies were made available, with 940 kHz reserved for "Zone 1", which was assigned to WGR later that year. Effective November 11, 1928, the recently formed Federal Radio Commission implemented its General Order 40, which divided transmitting frequencies into three categories: Clear Channel, Regional and Local. Most former Class B stations became clear channel stations, however WGR was moved to a regional frequency, 550 kHz, while the station previously at that frequency, WMAK, was reassigned to 900 kHz.

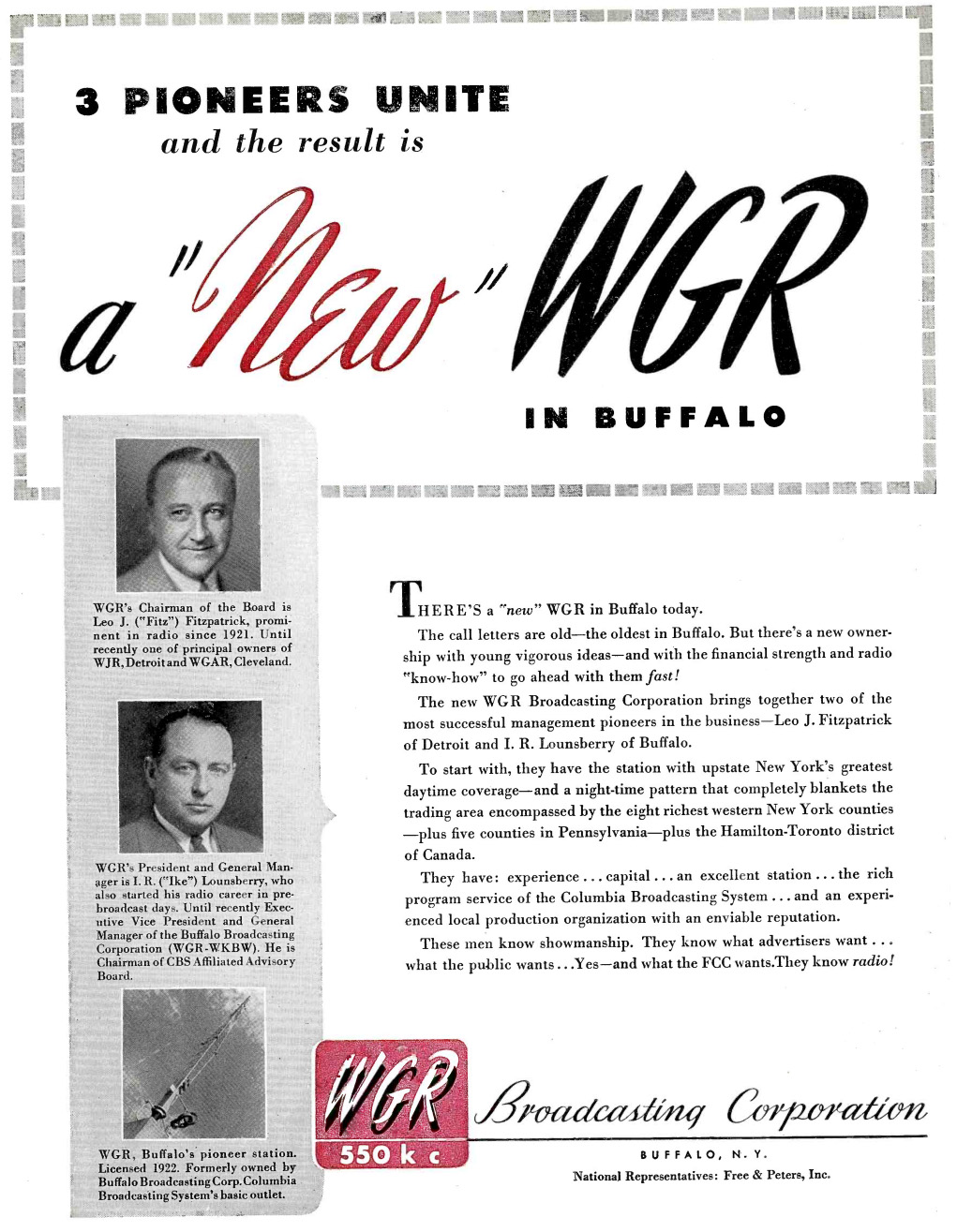
In 1946, station ownership was transferred to the WGR Broadcasting Corporation.

The August 1941 adoption of the Federal Communications Commission (FCC)'s "duopoly" rule restricted licensees from owning more than one radio station in a given market, and the Buffalo Broadcasting Company decided to divest WGR, while retaining WKBW. In late 1946, WGR was bought by a consortium of Western New York families known as the WGR Corporation. This company signed on WGR-TV (channel 2) in 1953 and WGR-FM (now WGRF) in 1959. WGR Corporation bought several other television and radio stations in the 1950s, and eventually became known as Transcontinent Broadcasting. Transcontinent merged with Taft Broadcasting in 1964. Taft sold off WGR-TV in 1983. Due to a current FCC rule that prohibited TV and radio stations in the same market, but with different owners, from sharing the same call letters, the TV station amended its call letters to WGRZ after it was sold. Taft retained both WGR and WGRQ (the former WGR-FM).

During its days as a full service radio station, "GR55"'s roster of personalities included "Buffalo Bob" Smith, later famous for TV's Howdy Doody children's show, and popular national TV and nightclub comedian Foster Brooks. The station's longtime music format combined adult top 40 hits and rock oldies and featured some of Buffalo's top radio personalities, talk hosts and news reporters including Stan Roberts, Frank Benny, Tom Donahue, Randy Michaels, Jim Scott, Jerry Reo, Shane, Joe Galuski, Tom Langmyer, George Hamberger, Tom Shannon, John Otto, Chuck Lakefield, Don Dussias, Lauri Githens, Wayne Smith, Sandy Kozel, Jane Tomczak, Tom Bauerle (as well as his brother, Dick Bauerle), Craig Matthews. WGR gradually evolved to talk radio during the late 1980s.

In 1987, Taft sold WGR and WRLT (the former WGRQ) to Rich Communications, which was part of the Robert Rich family's business holdings, which also included a major processed-food company (and with it, naming rights for the Buffalo Bills stadium then (now called Highmark Stadium) and a venture applying for a National League expansion baseball franchise (for which WGR was projected to be flagship station of the team's projected network). Although the Rich interests were the National League's choice for the new franchise they dropped out of the competition for an expansion team set to begin play in 1993 (which ultimately went to Denver, as the Colorado Rockies) for cost reasons. Soon after, WGR was eventually spun off to new owners.

=== The 1990s: News Radio 55 ===
For much of the 1990s, WGR was a successful news/talk station, competing with WBEN. From 1990 to 1994, WGR owned the radio broadcast rights to Buffalo Bills football, Buffalo Sabres hockey and Buffalo Bisons baseball. The Bills' four consecutive Super Bowl seasons were broadcast by WGR, whose program directors included Chuck Finney (1991–1993), Daryl Parks (1993–1995) and Jim Pastrick (1995–2000).

Through its news-talk era the WGR line-up featured a variety of programs such as Breakfast with Bauerle (Tom Bauerle), The Fabulous Sports Babe, Chuck Dickerson, Art Wander, Extension 55 with John Otto, Ron Dobson, John and Ken, Rick Emerson, Joey Reynolds, and several other local and national hosts. Syndicated talk radio host Leslie Marshall, controversial talk radio host J. R. Gach and future WFAN morning drive fixture Craig Carton also worked at the station. Jesse Ventura was at one time a candidate to host a show on the station, but lost out to Dobson. The station was, from the network's inception, an affiliate of ESPN Radio, which it carried on the weekends from 1992 to 2013.

In 1995, Rich Communications which owned both WGR and its FM counterpart WGRF, sold WGRF to Mercury Radio headed by Charles W. Banta. Simultaneously, Rich Communications entered into a local marketing agreement (LMA) with Keymarket Communications. The FCC approved the sale of WGR to Keymarket within twelve months of the LMA. Keymarket also owned WBEN, WMJQ, WWKB and WKSE. Keymarket merged with River City Broadcasting which was purchased by Sinclair Broadcast Group in 1997. Sinclair Broadcast Group sold its entire radio division to Entercom Communications in 1999.

=== Adoption of all-sports format ===
In February 2000, WGR became an all-sports talk radio station. Bauerle, for a short time, was retained and paired with Chris "Bulldog" Parker, who joined from WBEN for the morning show. Chuck Dickerson maintained his afternoon drive show. Jim Rome, who was added to the WGR line-up in late summer 1998, was retained when WGR switched to all sports. Anne Burke, a frequent caller to the station's talk shows, joined Bob Gaughan to co-host middays. Mike Maniscalco and later Brad Riter hosted the evening shift.

From October 2000 to 2004, WGR competed with WNSA, an FM station licensed to Wethersfield, New York, in rural Wyoming county (with a 107.3 translator in Buffalo). The two stations battled for listeners and the rights to broadcast sporting events. Several teams' broadcasts bounced between the two stations, such as the Bandits, New York Yankees, and Buffalo Destroyers.

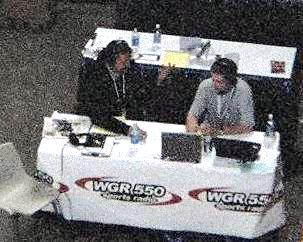
Schopp & Bulldog

WGR landed a coup when it signed WNSA's top afternoon host, Mike Schopp, from WNSA-FM in 2002; the event came at about the same time as when John Rigas and Adelphia Communications were beginning to collapse under massive financial scandal. WNSA never recovered and eventually WGR took the upper hand in the local sports radio battle. Schopp was at first teamed with Chuck Dickerson in afternoon drive. Dickerson, who had been particularly harsh against the Bills in what was believed to be revenge for being fired from his assistant coach position with the team a decade prior, was forced out in 2003 in an effort to make amends with the city's sports franchises and put them in better position to regain play-by-play rights; Schopp was teamed with Chris "Bulldog" Parker. Bauerle moved from WGR to sister station WBEN, Gaughan joined Kevin Sylvester in morning drive (Burke had been released long before this). Riter was paired with sidekick Jeremy White in the evening and lastly The Tony Kornheiser Show (from ESPN) was added in Gaughan and Burke's old time slot. (Kornheiser would later be replaced by Colin Cowherd by ESPN).

With the purchase of WNSA, WGR re-joined the New York Yankees Radio Network and for the first time since 1996, regained the radio rights to the Buffalo Sabres. Howard Simon, also from WNSA, joined in November 2004, with White moving from evenings to mornings to be Simon's sidekick.

In 2006, the Sabres and WGR renewed their broadcast agreement through 2012, and Yankees rights were dropped by 2007. In 2007, host Brad Riter was fired after failing to report for work, and he joined rival WECK in March 2008. A series of WGR staffers, as well as past and present Buffalo media personalities such as former WNSA and Empire Sports Network host (and former KOHD morning anchor) Jim Brinson and WIVB-TV sports director Dennis Williams, hosted the vacated slot. (WGR also tried to lure John Murphy, but because he was also at the time the radio host of the Bills, his contract prevented him from hosting the slot). In January 2008, Williams was hired as the new evening host at WGR; WIVB declined to his contract shortly thereafter, and replaced him with Murphy. Williams left the station in early 2009 to enter the sales industry.

WGR began a partial simulcast on Rochester sister station WROC in September 2008. Sabres games, Schopp and the Bulldog, and ESPN Radio were carried on WROC; Schopp and the Bulldog was dropped in 2011.

On January 4, 2012, it was announced that WGR would become the Buffalo Bills Radio Network flagship station, after previous owner WGRF decided against renewing their contract. As part of the deal, John Murphy began hosting a nightly talk show dedicated to the Bills on nights when the Sabres did not play. At the same time, Kevin Sylvester also returned to the station as the host of a daily Sabres-oriented talk show, Hockey Hotline, which last aired in 2004. WGR parent company Entercom moved the ESPN Radio affiliation to its own full-time affiliate, WWKB, in September 2013. CBS Sports Radio eventually filled the overnight time slots ESPN Radio had previously filled on WGR.

In 2016, the formation of MSG Western New York was announced. A regional sports channel for Western New York, the channel includes both Sabres and Bills programming. Two main WGR shows Sabres Hockey Hotline and The John Murphy Show began simulcasting on the channel on October 3, 2016. WGR and Pegula Sports and Entertainment reached a five-year contract extension for radio broadcasts not long afterward, keeping the Bills and Sabres broadcasts on WGR through 2021.

Also in 2016, former Sabres players Andrew Peters and Craig Rivet would start hosting The Instigators podcast. Peters and Rivet would leave the show in 2021 and be replaced by Brian Duff and former goaltender Martin Biron. They would use the same name for a short while then be rebranded to Sabres Live.

In 2018, Steve Tasker joined John Murphy and The John Murphy Show became One Bills Live. Two years later in 2020, Murphy announced he would be leaving One Bills Live to solely focus on his play-by-play duties with the Bills. He was replaced by Chris Brown.

In February 2026, the Bills and Sabres both announced that they had disaffiliated from WGR, moving both production and sales game coverage and daily shows such as One Bills Live and Sabres Live in house. The teams will distribute the shows online via their website and team apps and throughout the region via new broadcast affiliates, which could include WGR. On May 15, 2026, WGRF was announced as the flagship station for Bills' radio broadcasts. In a later statement, the Sabres clarified that though it had changed to the same distributor as the Bills, it had not in fact ended its affiliation with WGR and was still in negotiations with Audacy for extending their broadcast contract. An extension with the Sabres was reached on September 3, 2026.

Radio Insight, an industry publication, reported in February 2026 that Audacy was to begin simulcasting WGR on FM sister station WLKK (the former WNSA), which had a country music format. Audacy subsequently applied to the FCC to have WLKK's call letters changed to WGR-FM effective February 19, 2026. At midnight on February 17, 2026, WGR began simulcasting on WLKK. Simulcasting on what is now WGR-FM and its repeaters improved the station's reach in Batavia and extended its broadcast area to Rochester as well as provided a clearer sound in Buffalo/Niagara area. Five days later, WROC in Rochester rebranded itself as "WGR Rochester" and began carrying WGR's programming for much of the day, further improving its availability in that city.

19 years after his firing, Riter was re-hired at WGR in September 2026 to host the midday shift. Sabres Live, which had aired in part of the time slot, was moved to tape-delay.

== See also ==
- List of initial AM-band station grants in the United States
- List of three-letter broadcast call signs in the United States
