= Kevin Sylvester =

Kevin Sylvester may refer to:

- Kevin Sylvester (Canadian broadcaster)
- Kevin Sylvester (American broadcaster)
