= Art Wander =

American radio personality (1927–2025)

Arthur Wanderlich (November 13, 1927 – August 13, 2025), known professionally as Art Wander, was an American television and radio sports analyst, and radio format programmer, from Buffalo, New York.

== Life and career ==
Wander was born on November 13, 1927. Raised on the East Side of Buffalo to a Polish-American family, Wander took an early interest in radio, skipping classes to watch Foster Brooks and Buffalo Bob Smith perform their radio show on WGR live from the W. T. Grant department store.

After serving in the U.S. Navy, he produced radio programs for the Veterans Administration hospital system. In 1956 he joined WKBW as a news reporter, and in 1958 hired a young Irwin Weinstein, who returned to Western New York after a stint in West Virginia, as his assistant. Weinstein, later shortening his name to "Irv," eventually became an iconic Buffalo news anchor.

Wander went on to program radio stations in New York City, Chicago, Boston, Dallas, Baltimore, Atlanta, Tampa and Memphis. At WOR-FM in New York he met the Beatles and became a friend of Brian Epstein, their manager.

In the 1980s Wander returned to Buffalo radio as a programmer and as an on-air personality in sports radio at WGKT. Though his own sporting career was limited mostly to the amateur level (having variously played baseball, roller derby and boxing), he used his experience in radio and fandom of the Buffalo Bills and New York Mets to craft a show full of creative malapropisms, zingers toward public sports figures and friendly rapport with his callers. As a sports host, Wander earned the nicknames "the Tiny Tot of the Kilowatt" (for his 5'6" physique) and "your private pope", which was inspired by a fan made theme song. After Bills general manager Bill Polian called Wander out during a dinner speech, Wander's public profile rose dramatically, and after WGKT changed formats, Wander was hired by WGR in 1992 for a sports talk show, and, starting in 1996, worked in television for Empire Sports Network (and eventually Empire's radio arm, WNSA). He retired from Empire and WNSA in 2002.

Wander was inducted into the Buffalo Broadcasters Hall of Fame in 2008.

For much of the early 2010s, Wander appeared regularly as an analyst on the WBBZ-TV program "All Sports WNY" (hosted and managed by his former boss at Empire, Bob Koshinski) and wrote commentary for the program's website until 2017.

Wander had two children, Scott Wanderlich and Kelley Clem, from a previous marriage to Joann Adams that ended in divorce. He died at his home on August 13, 2025, at the age of 97.
