= Rob Ray =

Canadian ice hockey player & broadcaster

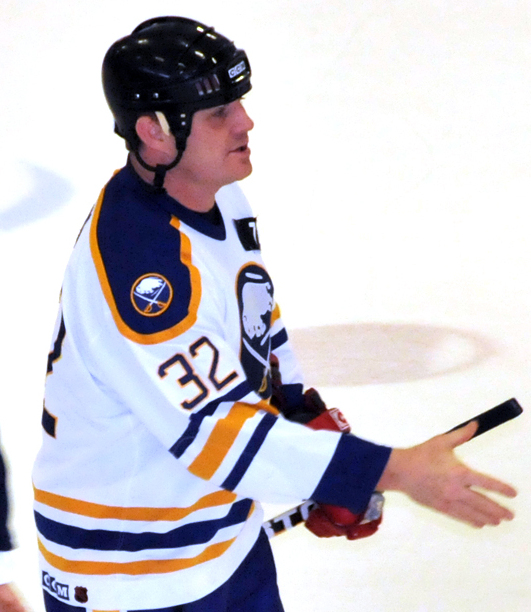
- Ray with the Buffalo Sabres Alumni Hockey Team in 2011
- Born: June 8, 1968 (age 58) Stirling, Ontario, Canada
- Height: 6 ft 0 in (183 cm)
- Weight: 220 lb (100 kg; 15 st 10 lb)
- Position: Right wing
- Shot: Left
- Played for: Buffalo Sabres; Ottawa Senators
- NHL draft: 97th overall, 1988; Buffalo Sabres
- Playing career: 1988–2004

Robert John Ray (born June 8, 1968) is a Canadian sports broadcaster and former professional ice hockey player for the Buffalo Sabres and Ottawa Senators. He was awarded the King Clancy Memorial Trophy by the National Hockey League (NHL) in 1999 for leadership and humanitarianism. He was known for his role as an enforcer and currently holds the Sabres record for most penalty minutes in one player's tenure with the club with 3,189 penalty minutes.

== Early career ==
Ray grew up in the small town of Stirling, Ontario playing competitive hockey for the Stirling Blues before moving up to the Tier II Jr.A. level with the OHA's Whitby Law Men in 1984–85. He was drafted in the 5th round of the 1985 OHL Priority Selection by the Cornwall Royals.

Ray played his junior hockey with the Cornwall Royals of the Ontario Hockey League (OHL). The Buffalo Sabres drafted Ray in the 5th round, 97th overall in the 1988 NHL entry draft. He played two full seasons with the Rochester Americans of the American Hockey League (AHL), during which he earned a reputation as a prolific fighter, notching over 700 penalty minutes in 125 games. Ray made his NHL debut with the Sabres during the 1989–90 season, in which he scored his first goal on his first shift on the ice. He also scored a goal on his last shift of his last game in the NHL. Ray became a regular on the team beginning in the 1990–91 NHL season, never finishing with fewer than 158 penalty minutes in any NHL season from that point on except his last. In a game against the Quebec Nordiques in 1992, Ray viciously beat a Nordiques fan who had snuck onto the ice and approached the Sabres bench. Considered imposing at 6'0", Ray was one of the toughest NHL players through the 1990s. In 1999, the NHL awarded Ray the King Clancy Memorial Trophy for his leadership and humanitarian contributions in the Buffalo and Western New York area. To date he is a regular with the Buffalo Sabres Alumni team and resides in Buffalo, New York, active with numerous community charities.

== The Rob Ray Rule ==
During fights, Ray's jersey and shoulder pads would quickly be shed due to his opponent's clutching and grabbing. This would result in his opponents no longer able to clutch and grab. This assisted Ray to control nearly every fight he was in. Fellow Sabre Brad May often employed this technique as well. As a result of this practice, the NHL created a new rule that specifically states that "a player who engages in fisticuffs and whose sweater is not properly 'tied-down' (jersey properly fastened to pants), and who loses his sweater (completely off his torso) in that altercation, shall receive a game misconduct."

Pundits saw this as a direct result of Rob Ray's style of fighting, and nicknamed the rule the Rob Ray Rule. After the implementation of the "Rob Ray Rule", Ray's fighting prowess continued unabated, highlighted by lengthy and, at times, bitter rivalries with fellow NHL enforcers such as Tie Domi, Mick Vukota, Paul Laus, Jeff Odgers and Dennis Vial. He appeared in a This is Sportscenter commercial where he acts as security at the station and beats up a courier after he says he can't show his ID.

== Post-retirement career ==
After 14 seasons as the Buffalo Sabres' main enforcer, Ray was traded to the Ottawa Senators for future considerations in 2003. Ray appeared in only 11 games over two seasons with the Senators, playing another 5 with their AHL affiliate, the Binghamton Senators. Ray ended his NHL career with 3,207 career penalty minutes, ranking him 6th overall in NHL history. Ray scored on his first shot in his first shift in the NHL, and also on his last shot in his last shift.

Ray worked for the Buffalo Sabres as an intermission, sideline, and post game reporter for games on the Sabres Hockey Network.

On 11 June 2012, the Buffalo Sabres announced that Ray would replace Harry Neale as the Sabres' colour commentator, where he worked alongside Rick Jeanneret and now with Dan Dunleavy. Ray also co-hosts, along with former Buffalo Bills star Ruben Brown, a weekly television show entitled The Enforcers for Time Warner Cable SportsNet. He is also on the permanent roster of the Buffalo Sabres Alumni Hockey Team and serves as the organization's president. He has also written a book titled "Rayzor's Edge". As of 2022 Ray is an assistant coach for the Buffalo Jr Sabres 09 team.

Alongside his work, he is married to Juliean Ray and is a father of two, Robert Jr. and Jordan Ray.

== Career statistics ==
Bold indicates led league

=== Regular season and playoffs ===
			Regular season					Playoffs
Season	Team	League	GP	G	A	Pts	PIM	GP	G	A	Pts	PIM
1983–84	Trenton Bobcats	MetJHL	40	11	10	21	57	—	—	—	—	—
1984–85	Whitby Lawmen	OPJHL	35	5	10	15	318	—	—	—	—	—
1985–86	Cornwall Royals	OHL	53	6	13	19	253	6	0	0	0	26
1986–87	Cornwall Royals	OHL	46	17	20	37	158	5	1	1	2	16
1987–88	Cornwall Royals	OHL	61	11	41	52	179	11	2	3	5	33
1988–89	Rochester Americans	AHL	74	11	18	29	446	—	—	—	—	—
1989–90	Rochester Americans	AHL	43	2	13	15	335	17	1	3	4	115
1989–90	Buffalo Sabres	NHL	27	2	1	3	99	—	—	—	—	—
1990–91	Rochester Americans	AHL	8	1	1	2	15	—	—	—	—	—
1990–91	Buffalo Sabres	NHL	66	8	8	16	350	6	1	1	2	56
1991–92	Buffalo Sabres	NHL	63	5	3	8	354	7	0	0	0	2
1992–93	Buffalo Sabres	NHL	68	3	2	5	211	—	—	—	—	—
1993–94	Buffalo Sabres	NHL	82	3	4	7	274	7	1	0	1	43
1994–95	Buffalo Sabres	NHL	47	0	3	3	173	5	0	0	0	14
1995–96	Buffalo Sabres	NHL	71	3	6	9	287	—	—	—	—	—
1996–97	Buffalo Sabres	NHL	82	7	3	10	286	12	0	1	1	28
1997–98	Buffalo Sabres	NHL	63	2	4	6	234	10	0	0	0	24
1998–99	Buffalo Sabres	NHL	76	0	4	4	**261**	5	1	0	1	0
1999–00	Buffalo Sabres	NHL	69	1	3	4	158	—	—	—	—	—
2000–01	Buffalo Sabres	NHL	63	4	6	10	210	3	0	0	0	2
2001–02	Buffalo Sabres	NHL	71	2	3	5	200	—	—	—	—	—
2002–03	Buffalo Sabres	NHL	41	0	0	0	92	—	—	—	—	—
2002–03	Ottawa Senators	NHL	5	0	0	0	4	—	—	—	—	—
2003–04	Ottawa Senators	NHL	6	1	0	1	14	—	—	—	—	—
2003–04	Binghamton Senators	AHL	5	2	0	2	11	—	—	—	—	—
NHL totals			900	41	50	91	3,207	55	3	2	5	169

== See also ==
- List of NHL players with 2000 career penalty minutes

Preceded by Kelly Chase	Winner of the King Clancy Memorial Trophy; 1999	Succeeded by Curtis Joseph
