= John Gurtler =

American sportscaster

John Gurtler II is an American sportscaster. He is most noted for having succeeded Ted Darling as television play-by-play announcer for the Buffalo Sabres, a position he held from 1992 until 1995. Previously, he served as the intermission host from 1989 to 1991. He currently serves as the radio play-by-play announcer for the Buffalo Bandits and has served as the public address announcer for the Buffalo Bills.

== Early life ==
A native of Denver, Gurtler earned a football scholarship to Western State College. He quit football after three days to pursue other campus activities, including acting.

== Early career ==
Gurtler's early work includes serving as the radio play-by-play announcer for the Colorado Flames of the Central Hockey League and working as a sports director for KJCT in Grand Junction, Colorado and weekend sports anchor KRDO-TV in Colorado Springs, Colorado. In 1984, he moved to New York to become the play-by-play announcer for the Rochester Americans.

== Buffalo Sabres ==
In 1986, Gurtler became the public relations director for the Sabres. In 1989, he became the host of Sabres' television coverage. In December 1991, Gurtler became the team's television announcer after Ted Darling went on medical leave. He became the team's full time play-by-play announcer the following season when Darling could not return. In 1995, the Sabres opted to replaced Gurtler with popular radio announcer Rick Jeanneret.

== Post-Sabres career ==
In 1997, Gurtler was hired as co-public address announcer for the Buffalo Bills (Gurtler took over in-game announcements while Stan Roberts' duties were reduced to pregame, halftime and postgame announcements). In 2008 he was replaced by Marc Honan of WGRF, the Bills' flagship radio station. In 2004 he became the play-by-play announcer for the Buffalo Bandits of the National Lacrosse League. In 2016 he began teaching the new Play-By-Play Announcements course at Canisius College. In 2026, Gurtler was named to the National Lacrosse League Hall of Fame.

== Personal life ==
Gurtler and his family reside in Orchard Park. The family made headlines when a 2008 post-prom party held on the premises was raided by local police and it was discovered that copious amounts of alcohol were being served to the mostly underage patrons, totaling at least seventy in all. Gurtler and his son pleaded guilty to charges of disorderly conduct and were granted conditional discharges.
