= Jim Lorentz =

Canadian ice hockey player (born 1947)

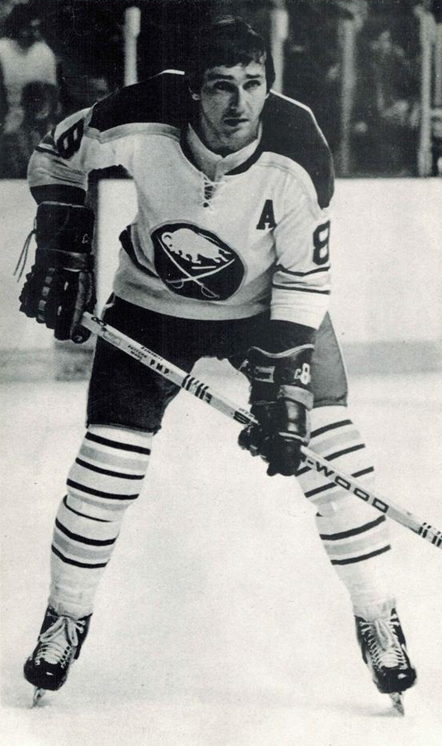
- Born: May 1, 1947 (age 79) Waterloo, Ontario, Canada
- Height: 6 ft 0 in (183 cm)
- Weight: 180 lb (82 kg; 12 st 12 lb)
- Position: Centre
- Shot: Left
- Played for: Buffalo Sabres; New York Rangers; St. Louis Blues; Boston Bruins
- Playing career: 1967–1978

James Peter Lorentz, Jr. (born May 1, 1947) is a Canadian retired professional ice hockey centre who played 10 seasons in the National Hockey League for the Boston Bruins, St. Louis Blues, New York Rangers and Buffalo Sabres between 1969 and 1978. He won the Stanley Cup with Boston in 1970. He was the color analyst for the Sabres on the MSG Network and the Sabres Radio Network. He worked alongside play-by-play commentator Rick Jeanneret.

== Career ==
Lorentz's career started in 1964 when he played the first of three years of junior hockey with the Niagara Falls Flyers, which was part of the Ontario Hockey Association. He began his professional hockey career with the Oklahoma City Blazers of Central Hockey League in 1967-68. Lorentz was named rookie of the year in his first season with the CHL. In his second and final season in the minor leagues, he led the league in scoring and was named as the Most Valuable Player.

Lorentz left the CHL and went to play for the Boston Bruins, which were a powerhouse in the NHL, led by Bobby Orr and Phil Esposito. Lorentz scored his first NHL goal in Boston's 4-0 home win against Pittsburgh on March 2, 1969. Lorentz did not play much that season, and was shuffled around from center ice and to the wing. In his rookie season with the Bruins, Lorentz won the Stanley Cup in the 1970 Stanley Cup Final. After the Cup, the Bruins traded Lorentz to the St. Louis Blues in exchange for the Blues' first pick in the 1970 Amateur Draft (the pick was used to select Ron Plumb).

Jim played the 1970-71 season with St. Louis before splitting the 1971-72 season between the Blues, the New York Rangers and the Buffalo Sabres. Over his more than six seasons with the Sabres, Jim racked up 134 goals, 197 assists and 331 points in 487 games. Jim also enjoyed his best seasons in a Sabre uniform, recording a career-high 27 goals in 1972-73 season and a personal-best 70 points in 1974-75 season, the same year he helped Buffalo reach the Stanley Cup Final. In 1975, during game three of the 1975 Stanley Cup Final against the Philadelphia Flyers at the Memorial Auditorium, Lorentz earned the nickname "Batman" when he swatted a bat out of mid-air with his stick. During the 1975 finals, Lorentz scored 6 goals and 10 points in 16 playoff games. Lorentz continued to play until 1978 when he retired from NHL duty. He retired with 659 games, 161 goals, 238 assists and 399 points.

After he stopped playing hockey with the Sabres, Lorentz served as the color commentator/play-by-play announcer for the Sabres. He filled in for Ted Darling from October 16, 1991 to November 20, 1991 when Darling was on medical leave. He also filled in for Sabres play-by-play announcer Rick Jeanneret twice.

== Retirement ==
On September 25, 2007, he announced his retirement from his position as color commentator for the Sabres after 26 years as a broadcaster with the team. The official statement was as follows: "My long association with the Buffalo Sabres was nothing but positive and I was fortunate to retire from the game as a player but be able to stay involved as a broadcaster," said Jim Lorentz. "I was blessed to work with two of the best play-by-play men of all-time in Ted Darling and Rick Jeanneret. This was a tough decision to make, but after 43 years of travel as a player and broadcaster, I based my decision on the unwillingness to tackle another long season and grueling travel schedule." Lorentz later stated that, if he had been given the same opportunity as Jeanneret later got to reduce his workload to only home games, he would have stayed on with the team.

In late 2015, Lorentz decided to return to Western New York to coach the Hamburg Hawks youth hockey team.

=== Buffalo Sabres Hall of Fame ===
Lorentz was inducted to the Buffalo Sabres hall of fame on February 9, 2010. During the first intermission, Lorentz told the viewers that he is currently working on a full book about salmon fishing and is also an avid fisherman during his retirement from broadcasting. As of March 2014, Lorentz stated the book was nearly complete. The Atlantic Salmon: Moody & Mysterious was published in 2017.

== Career statistics ==
=== Regular season and playoffs ===
			Regular season					Playoffs
Season	Team	League	GP	G	A	Pts	PIM	GP	G	A	Pts	PIM
1963–64	Kitchener-Waterloo Siskins	COJHL	—	—	—	—	—	—	—	—	—	—
1964–65	Niagara Falls Flyers	OHA	43	7	14	21	20	11	5	6	11	16
1965–66	Niagara Falls Flyers	OHA	38	11	22	33	47	4	1	2	3	4
1965–66	Niagara Falls Flyers	M-Cup	—	—	—	—	—	13	5	8	13	14
1966–67	Niagara Falls Flyers	OHA	48	33	59	92	79	13	4	17	21	10
1967–68	Oklahoma City Blazers	CHL	70	33	50	83	105	7	1	1	2	10
1968–69	Boston Bruins	NHL	11	1	3	4	6	—	—	—	—	—
1968–69	Oklahoma City Blazers	CHL	56	33	68	101	67	12	9	16	25	17
1969–70	Boston Bruins	NHL	68	7	16	23	30	11	1	0	1	4
1970–71	St. Louis Blues	NHL	76	19	21	40	34	6	0	1	1	4
1971–72	St. Louis Blues	NHL	12	0	1	1	12	—	—	—	—	—
1971–72	New York Rangers	NHL	7	0	0	0	0	—	—	—	—	—
1971–72	Buffalo Sabres	NHL	33	10	14	24	12	—	—	—	—	—
1972–73	Buffalo Sabres	NHL	78	27	35	62	30	6	0	3	3	2
1973–74	Buffalo Sabres	NHL	78	23	31	54	28	—	—	—	—	—
1974–75	Buffalo Sabres	NHL	72	25	45	70	18	16	6	4	10	6
1975–76	Buffalo Sabres	NHL	75	17	24	41	18	9	1	2	3	6
1976–77	Buffalo Sabres	NHL	79	23	33	56	8	6	4	0	4	8
1977–78	Buffalo Sabres	NHL	70	9	15	24	12	—	—	—	—	—
NHL totals			659	161	238	399	208	54	12	10	22	30

== See also ==
- List of Buffalo Sabres broadcasters

Preceded by Bryan Watson	CHL Leading Scorer; 1968–69	Succeeded by Jack Egers
Preceded by Bryan Watson	CHL Most Valuable Player Award; 1968–69	Succeeded by Dan Johnson
