= Chris Parker (radio) =

American sports radio personality (born 1965)

Christopher Parker (born July 1, 1965), known professionally as Chris "The Bulldog" Parker, is an American sports radio personality. He is the co-host of Buffalo's WGR 550's afternoon show from 3:00 until 7:00PM along with Mike Schopp. That program was also simulcast on WROC AM 950 in Rochester until the Summer of 2011. Besides the weekday show, "Schopp and the Bulldog" have also hosted a postgame Buffalo Bills show after every Bills regular season contest from Casino Niagara in Niagara Falls, Ontario, but most recently from WGR's Southwestern Avenue Tailgate stage at Ralph Wilson Stadium, or the studio. The post game show primarily consists of phone calls from fans and recorded press conference clips from key players and coaches.

Parker worked at a pizzeria while doing a part-time weekend call-in show on WBEN before hosting a weeknight program on WBEN-AM in Buffalo. When Howard Simon left WBEN to join the Empire Sports Network, Parker became the full-time WBEN nightly host. When WGR switched to all-sports after being purchased by Entercom Communications, Parker was placed on the morning show with Tom Bauerle before moving to afternoons. Parker is a lifelong fan of Buffalo sports teams and often recalls memories from past seasons. He is married with two sons and currently resides in North Buffalo. He has an interest in motor sports, including his own motorcycle. His favorite bands include The Clash and Wilco.

Parker and Schopp previously hosted the pre-game show of the Buffalo Sabres. They often spoke to play-by-play voice Rick Jeanneret and beat reporter Paul Hamilton leading into the official broadcast.

== Show bits ==
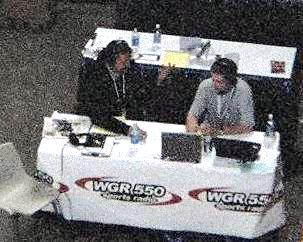
Schopp & Bulldog

Schopp & Bulldog's show feature a number of recurring segments, which have aired on both WNSA and WGR. They include the following:

- Hall of Fame Rejection Committee: This idea was started while Schopp was at WNSA. Each day Schopp and his staff (usually 3 in all) would eliminate one person from the Hall of Fame until only one player, the greatest contributor to the sport of all time, remained. In 2005, the Baseball Committee ultimately selected Willie Mays over Babe Ruth. Successors included the Pro Football Hall of Fame Rejection Committee (which selected Otto Graham), the Rock and Roll Hall of Fame Rejection Committee (which selected The Rolling Stones over The Beatles and Bob Dylan in August 2007), the Hockey Hall of Fame Rejection Committee (which selected Bobby Orr), and the Basketball Hall of Fame Rejection Committee (which is ongoing as of 2011).
- Haseoke: These are supposed to be the lost tapes of former Buffalo Sabres goaltender Dominik Hašek "singing" in a heavy Czech accent and wildly off pitch. The voice of Hasek was never revealed but is believed to be Schopp's former producer, Steve Cichon, who sells the Haseoke tapes on his Web site.
- Greg Bauch comedy sketches which air occasionally as bumpers between sports updates and sometimes as comedy relief. They include the Colorado School of Mimes; a sketch about the real Division II school- Colorado School of Mines, changed to "mimes", that attempts to play a game of college football.
- The show incorporates their website, and asks listeners to respond to issues. These topics include: The Sports Facial Hair Hall of Fame and The Earth Sports Fortress of Pantheon
