= Empire Sports Network =

American regional sports network (1990–2005)

- Country: United States
- Broadcast area: Upstate New York; Nationwide (via satellite)
- Network: Prime Network (1990–1996), Fox Sports Net (1996–2005)
- Headquarters: West Seneca, New York

Programming
- Language: English

Ownership
- Owner: Adelphia Communications Corporation

History
- Launched: December 31, 1990
- Closed: March 7, 2005
- Replaced by: MSG; Spectrum Sports (New York); NFL Network (in Western New York areas)

Empire Sports Network was an American regional sports network that was owned by the Adelphia Communications Corporation. The network was available on cable providers in much of upstate New York (stretching from Buffalo to Albany), as well as parts of northern Pennsylvania and eastern Ohio. The network ceased operations on March 7, 2005, in the midst of Adelphia's financial collapse and bankruptcy.

== History ==
=== Beginnings ===
Empire Sports Network launched on December 31, 1990; its first broadcast that evening was a National Hockey League game between the Buffalo Sabres and the Philadelphia Flyers. Founded by John Rigas (founder and chief executive officer of network parent Adelphia Communications), the idea for Empire Sports was first conceived in 1989; Rigas decided to operate the new network in Buffalo, instead of in Adelphia's corporate homebase of Coudersport, Pennsylvania, a rural borough dozens of miles away from the nearest major sports teams. Originally broadcasting as a part-time service for four hours each night from 8:00 p.m. to 12:00 a.m., the network originally carried games from the Sabres (carrying locally televised games not broadcast on Fox affiliate WUTV (channel 29), which carried the team's games under a separate contract), the Buffalo Bisons of the International League and Major League Baseball games from the Pittsburgh Pirates. Empire was an outgrowth of the Niagara Frontier Sports Network (NFSN), a partnership between the Sabres and Adelphia that had carried Sabres games on cable on a part-time basis through much of the 1980s.

Adelphia launched the network without seeking a specified carriage fee rate, offering Empire Sports to cable providers for free on a "good faith" basis. However, in June 1991, Tele-Communications Inc. briefly dropped the network from its systems in New York state, after TCI decided against carrying it without a firm carriage agreement. In October 1991, the network became an affiliate of the Prime Network group of regional sports networks; at that time, the network expanded its programming schedule to 19 hours per day, operating from 5:00 a.m. to 12:00 a.m.

On August 10, 1994, Empire acquired the exclusive regional television rights to the Sabres; as part of the deal, Empire also struck a deal with WUTV parent Act III Broadcasting to air over-the-air simulcasts of ten regular season games (a third of the 30 games that the station had been carrying under a separate contract with the team) and any playoff games during the term of the agreement. By 1995, Empire had expanded its carriage to TCI systems in Rochester and Syracuse; the network expanded its statewide coverage eastward to Albany and Binghamton. The next year, 1996, saw the Prime Network converted to Fox Sports Net, and Empire thus became an FSN affiliate, airing nationally provided sports programming from Fox and in turn contributing footage to FSN shows such as Fox Sports News.

The Sabres' relationship with Empire Sports strengthened in 1998, when Adelphia and the Rigas family purchased the team. Following the purchase, the network expanded its coverage of the team, culminating in the Sabres' advancement to the Stanley Cup Final in May 1999, when it provided 12 hours of coverage daily from 12:00 p.m. to 12:00 a.m. during the championship series. The network's unbridled coverage of the Sabres caught the attention of the National Hockey League, with league Commissioner Gary Bettman commenting that "if the rest of the league was covered like Empire Sports covers the Sabres, we would be as big as the NFL." By 2001, Empire Sports had over 6.7 million subscribers via both cable providers in New York, northern Pennsylvania and northeastern Ohio and nationally on satellite.

Between October 2000 and March 2004, Adelphia, under vice president/general manager Bob Koshinski, used staff from Empire to operate Wethersfield radio station WNSA (107.7 FM). The station overtook WGR (550 AM) as the ratings leader among the Buffalo market's two sports radio stations in the spring of 2001, but subsequently lost several of its talent, including prominent afternoon host Mike Schopp, to WGR when the Rigas/Adelphia scandal broke.

=== Collapse ===
Empire Sports thrived until March 2002, when the Securities and Exchange Commission began investigating accusations of internal corruption and securities violations by Adelphia executives (including John Rigas and his son, chief operating officer Timothy Rigas), leading up to the company's subsequent bankruptcy filing, as Adelphia was mired in off-balance-sheet debt totaling $2.3 billion. With Adelphia in freefall and under temporary bank-appointed management, Empire was unable to renew its carriage agreement with Time Warner Cable, its largest non-Adelphia customer and the primary cable provider for nearly all of upstate New York, in the fall of 2002; TWC continued to carry Empire on its Syracuse system for eight months without a carriage deal in place, later announcing plans to replace it with the Outdoor Life Network on May 1, 2003. Empire Sports and Time Warner Cable struck an agreement in April 2003, which would significantly reduce its coverage by migrating the network from TWC's analog service to a digital sports tier in Syracuse and Binghamton.

The network continued to operate, but was dealt another severe blow in 2003 when Adelphia's board of directors appointed William Schleyer as its new chief executive officer and Ron Cooper as its chief operating officer. With questions surrounding whether Adelphia was even still interested in being in the lucrative regional sports business and if Empire Sports would survive its parent's ongoing collapse, the company laid off 27 full-time employees and all freelancers on August 19. The staff cuts forced Empire to immediately eliminate the popular news/call-in show Fan TV, but the network itself was still able to survive for another eighteen months.

The lockout that wiped out the entire 2004–05 NHL season served both as a blessing and a death blow. Financially, the lockout benefited the network because it was not required to pay the Sabres its annual rights fee of $9.5 million. The Sabres had acted as a loss leader for Empire, and without them, the network had no core programming (incidentally, Empire Sports nearly lost the Sabres telecasts when its previous broadcast deal expired in 2003; however, due to the absence of other offers, the Sabres chose against exercising an option to pay Adelphia $1 million to terminate its agreement with the network). Further complicating matters, Time Warner later decided to drop Empire from its systems in Syracuse, Rochester and Binghamton on December 1, 2004, leaving Empire available only in Western New York and the city of Utica, although it remained on the sports tier packages of DirecTV and Dish Network across the country. Howard Simon's radio-TV simulcast show was among the last local programs (other than the nightly sports report) that aired on the network.

From the time Adelphia decided to sell WNSA, the network also streamed online until the closing of its sale to Entercom Communications, which purchased the station in May 2004 for $10.3 million; when the station was sold, Empire Sports merely switched the Internet stream from WNSA to Empire's feed. Empire's partnership with WNSA ended in the fall of 2004, when Entercom switched its format to classic rock under the brand "107.7 The Lake". Simon's show, however, continued on WLVL (1340 AM) in Lockport until November 2004, when he was recruited to host WGR's morning show.

Under the watch of Schleyer and Cooper, on January 24, 2005, Adelphia announced that would shut down Empire Sports on March 7, instead of selling it to several interested parties, citing severe financial losses. Adelphia resisted offers from outside interests to purchase Empire – including a $17 million cash bid by Joshua Pollack (a native of Buffalo and founder of New York City-based media company NXT Communications), a failed bids by the Hamister group (which would have also included the Sabres) and the Buffalo Bills was also interested in purchasing Empire Sports – desiring instead to pocket the retransmission consent fees (totaling an average of $1.98 per subscriber) that would have gone to Empire's new owner had the network been sold off. Tom Golisano and Larry Quinn decided against buying Empire Sports in their purchase of the Sabres.

Despite concerns from viewers and local political leaders, Adelphia announced on January 19, 2005, that it would shut down Empire altogether. On January 23, the network laid off all but two of its 30 employees. The network cancelled its original programming, replacing it with a continuous tape loop, showing highlights from the network's history. Empire signed off for good on March 7, 2005, with Adelphia replacing it on its former analog channel slot on its Western New York systems with the NFL Network.

=== Aftermath ===
Adelphia was acquired by Time Warner Cable and Comcast, which completed the asset transfer and division on August 1, 2006. CEO William Schleyer received a bonus of $15 million and COO Ron Cooper received $9 million as part of their compensation package from the re-structured Adelphia Board of Directors.

After Empire's contract with the team expired, the Buffalo Sabres signed a new cable rights agreement with New York City-based MSG Network, where the team's games remain to this day; however, the broadcasts are still produced by the Sabres organization as they were during the duration of its agreement with Empire.

Syracuse University maintains an agreement with what was then Time Warner Cable for extensive local coverage of its teams, the result of which was the creation of what was originally Time Warner Sports 26 and would eventually end its life as Spectrum Sports, a sports network that covers most of Empire's old territory and operated out of Empire's old studios in West Seneca. Some of Empire's sports rights, such as the handful of Bisons games that aired on the network, ended up being acquired by WNGS (channel 67), before ending up back in Time Warner's hands after WNGS briefly came under the operation of a religious organization; WNGS, now rechristened as WBBZ-TV, originally indicated it would make a greater push for sports rights after being revived as a commercial, locally owned station (indeed, WBBZ hired Koshinski as an executive producer in 2012). Ultimately, WBBZ abandoned most of its sports broadcasts in 2015 when Koshinski left the station. Spectrum Sports shut down operations in 2017.

Terrence Pegula, who purchased the Sabres and Bills in the early 2010s, raised the possibility of launching an in-house regional sports network when the Sabres' contract with MSG ended after the 2016–17 season. Rather than go through the process of building a team-owned network from scratch, in June 2016, it was announced that Pegula had reached a deal to expand its relationship with MSG by forming a regional opt-out of MSG Network known as MSG Western New York, which is co-owned by Pegula and carries additional local studio programming covering the Bills and Sabres.

Zito Media, the company established by the Rigas family to replace Adelphia, has not re-entered the regional sports network market.

Empire's Web site remained live but abandoned for 13 years after the network's closure, in part to prevent a fake news website of the same name from claiming the domain. The empiresports.com domain was eventually transferred to a marketing firm in Dublin, Ohio.

== Programming ==
The network was the flagship station for Buffalo Sabres NHL games, however it also aired collegiate sports (particularly those involving Syracuse University), and several sports news and talk shows. Empire also aired a significant number of programs covering the National Football League's Buffalo Bills; live play-by-play of the Arena Football League's Buffalo Destroyers, the Pittsburgh Pirates of Major League Baseball, the Buffalo Bisons, Rochester Red Wings and Syracuse Chiefs of the AAA International League; AHL hockey; and NCAA basketball. Buffalo Bandits lacrosse also received limited coverage on the network.

Empire also aired NBA games featuring the Toronto Raptors for several seasons until January 2005, when all original and live programming on the network was discontinued. In its latter years, the network also aired live Canadian Football League games on Friday nights and tape delayed telecasts on Saturday mornings.

Some of Empire's programs included Fan TV, a daily 2½-hour late-afternoon sports news and call-in program hosted by Howard Simon and Jim Brinson) and its successor, The SimonCast; the Empire Sports Report, a nightly sportscast hosted by Mike DeGeorge, Josh Mora and Jason Bristol; and Hockey Hotline, the Sabres' post-game report hosted by NHL veteran Mike Robitaille and later with Brian Blessing. Other popular shows included Fan Forum with Bob Koshinski, which aired from 1991 to 1998 and Pros and Cons (a predecessor to Pardon the Interruption that featured WGRZ-TV sports director Ed Kilgore pitted against contrarian and WGR radio host Art Wander, with Buffalo News sports editor Larry Felser moderating), which ran from 1992 to 1996. As an affiliate of first the Prime Network and then Fox Sports Net, Empire also carried nationally oriented programming from those networks.

Former Bills punter Paul Maguire (now an NFL analyst for ESPN) also hosted the Budweiser Sportsline on the network during the NFL season; Pete Weber and Danny Gare (who both currently work as NHL announcers) also worked for Empire along with former Buffalo Bill Steve Tasker (now of CBS). Van Miller lent his voice to several college basketball games on Empire during the early years of the network. The network also aired ECW Hardcore TV produced by Extreme Championship Wrestling, a now-defunct professional wrestling promotion based in Philadelphia.

The network also carried Rush Hour On Dirt, showing live races from the Super DIRTcar Series and carrying the annual 200 lap dirt modified race at Super Dirt Week from the New York State Fairgrounds Racetrack. The programming eventually moved to Speed (TV network) in 2003.
