= Danny Gare =

Canadian ice hockey player (born 1954)

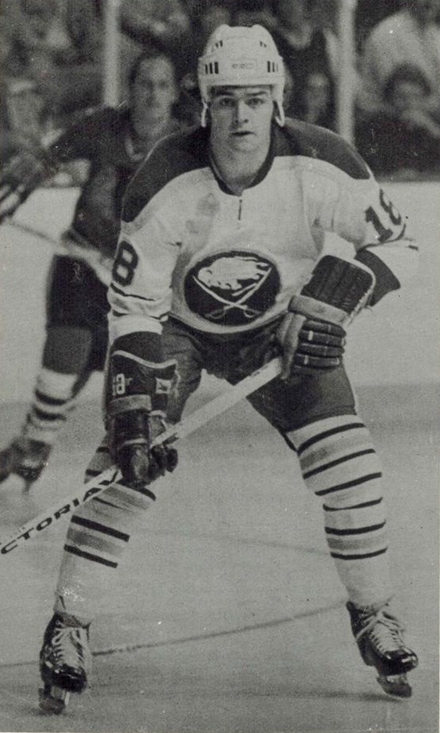
- Gare with the Buffalo Sabres in 1974
- Born: May 14, 1954 (age 72) Nelson, British Columbia, Canada
- Height: 5 ft 9 in (175 cm)
- Weight: 175 lb (79 kg; 12 st 7 lb)
- Position: Right wing
- Shot: Right
- Played for: Buffalo Sabres; Detroit Red Wings; Edmonton Oilers
- National team: Canada
- NHL draft: 29th overall, 1974; Buffalo Sabres
- WHA draft: 36th overall, 1974; Winnipeg Jets
- Playing career: 1974–1987

Daniel Mirl Gare (born May 14, 1954) is a Canadian broadcaster, ice hockey coach and former National Hockey League (NHL) player, most notably of the Buffalo Sabres. During a 13-year professional career, Gare also played for the Detroit Red Wings and Edmonton Oilers. He was a two-time All-Star right winger who twice scored 50 goals in a season for the Sabres.

== Playing career ==
Gare played for the WCJHL's Calgary Centennials from 1971 to 1974. In his final season with the team, he had 127 points. Gare was selected by the Buffalo Sabres with the 29th pick of the 1974 NHL amateur draft.

Gare, who wore #18, scored his first career NHL goal just 18 seconds into his first regular season game helping the Sabres defeat the Boston Bruins, 9–5, on October 10, 1974.

In his rookie season of 1974–75, he had 62 points in the regular season and 13 points in the playoffs, as Buffalo went to the Stanley Cup finals. The following year, Gare had 50 goals and 73 points. He had 77 points in 1977–78. In 1979–80, he tied for the league lead with 56 goals and had a career-high 89 points. He then had 85 points the following season.

Because of his goal scoring prowess he played right wing on the power play even during The French Connection years, which pushed René Robert back to the point. He holds team records for most goals by a right winger (267), most game-tying goals (21), and fastest goal scored from start of NHL career (0:18 into his debut versus the Boston Bruins on 10 October 1974).

On December 2, 1981, Gare, along with Jim Schoenfeld and Derek Smith were traded to the Detroit Red Wings in exchange for Mike Foligno, Dale McCourt and Brent Peterson. Sabres goalie Bob Sauve was dealt to the Red Wings in a separate transaction. Gare finished his career with the Edmonton Oilers in 1986–87.

Gare served as the Sabres captain from the 1977–78 season through his trade to Detroit. He was the Red Wings captain for four seasons from 1982 through 1986.

== Post-career ==
Following his playing career, Gare was briefly an assistant coach and TV colour analyst for the Tampa Bay Lightning, and served on the Buffalo Sabres broadcast team on Empire Sports Network. He served as colour analyst for the Columbus Blue Jackets under FSN Ohio from 2006 until April 2009. He also served as an interim studio analyst for the Sabres when Mike Robitaille has been unavailable and did colour commentary for games that Harry Neale was unable to work. He was appointed the alternate Sabres colour analyst and paired with Kevin Sylvester in an effort to reduce the workload of longtime Sabres broadcaster Rick Jeanneret.

Gare was inducted into the Buffalo Sabres Hall of Fame in 1994. On November 22, 2005, Gare had his number 18 jersey retired by the Sabres. He is the fifth player of seven total so honored.

== Achievements and awards ==
- WCHL All-Star Team (1974)
- NHL Second All-Star Team (1980)
- NHL All-Star Game (1980, 1981)

== Career statistics ==
=== Regular season and playoffs ===
			Regular season					Playoffs
Season	Team	League	GP	G	A	Pts	PIM	GP	G	A	Pts	PIM
1971–72	Calgary Centennials	WCHL	56	10	17	27	15	13	1	1	2	2
1972–73	Calgary Centennials	WCHL	65	45	43	88	107	6	5	5	10	18
1973–74	Calgary Centennials	WCHL	65	68	59	127	238	14	10	12	22	53
1974–75	Buffalo Sabres	NHL	78	31	31	62	75	17	7	6	13	19
1975–76	Buffalo Sabres	NHL	79	50	23	73	129	9	5	2	7	21
1976–77	Buffalo Sabres	NHL	35	11	15	26	73	4	0	0	0	18
1977–78	Buffalo Sabres	NHL	69	39	38	77	95	8	4	6	10	37
1978–79	Buffalo Sabres	NHL	71	27	40	67	90	3	0	0	0	9
1979–80	Buffalo Sabres	NHL	76	56	33	89	90	14	4	7	11	35
1980–81	Buffalo Sabres	NHL	73	46	39	85	109	3	3	0	3	8
1981–82	Buffalo Sabres	NHL	22	7	14	21	25	—	—	—	—	—
1981–82	Detroit Red Wings	NHL	36	13	9	22	74	—	—	—	—	—
1982–83	Detroit Red Wings	NHL	79	26	35	61	107	—	—	—	—	—
1983–84	Detroit Red Wings	NHL	63	13	13	26	147	4	2	0	2	38
1984–85	Detroit Red Wings	NHL	71	27	29	56	163	2	0	0	0	10
1985–86	Detroit Red Wings	NHL	57	7	9	16	102	—	—	—	—	—
1986–87	Edmonton Oilers	NHL	18	1	3	4	6	—	—	—	—	—
NHL totals			827	354	331	685	1,285	64	25	21	46	195

=== International ===
Year	Team	Event	GP	G	A	Pts	PIM
1976	Canada	CC	1	0	0	0	0
1981	Canada	CC	7	1	5	6	2
Senior totals			8	1	5	6	2

Preceded by Jim Schoenfeld	Buffalo Sabres captain 1977–81	Succeeded by Gilbert Perreault
Preceded by Mike Bossy	NHL Goal Leader; 1980 (tied with Charlie Simmer and Blaine Stoughton)	Succeeded by Mike Bossy
Preceded by Reed Larson	Detroit Red Wings captain 1982–86	Succeeded by Steve Yzerman
