= Mike Robitaille =

Canadian ice hockey defenceman

- Born: February 12, 1948 (age 78) Midland, Ontario, Canada
- Height: 5 ft 11 in (180 cm)
- Weight: 195 lb (88 kg; 13 st 13 lb)
- Position: Defence
- Shot: Right
- Played for: New York Rangers; Detroit Red Wings; Buffalo Sabres; Vancouver Canucks
- Playing career: 1968–1977

Michael James David Robitaille (born February 12, 1948) is a Canadian former professional ice hockey defenceman and commentator. He played in the National Hockey League with the New York Rangers, Detroit Red Wings, Buffalo Sabres and Vancouver Canucks in a career that lasted from 1968 to 1977.

== Playing career ==
Robitaille played in 382 regular season NHL games, scoring 23 goals and adding 105 assists. He was most well known for his punishing hip checks. He also appeared in 13 playoff games, six with Buffalo and seven for Vancouver, tallying one assist. His career ended pre-maturely in 1977 when he was blind-sided by Dennis Owchar of the Pittsburgh Penguins, which caused nerve damage in his neck. He later won a lawsuit against the Canucks for mistreating his injuries.

== Post-playing career ==
After retiring, Robitaille joined the Sabres' broadcasting arm in 1985. He was one of the founders of Hockey Hotline, the Buffalo Sabres' postgame show on Empire Sports Network, in 1991 and worked for the Sabres and various sister outlets until his retirement from television in 2014. He is known for his colorful analogies and exaggerations.

During the 2000s, Robitaille was the fill-in commentator whenever play-by-play announcer Rick Jeanneret and former color commentators Jim Lorentz or Harry Neale couldn't fulfill their duties on a game day broadcast.

In February 2010, Robitaille was injured in a car accident suffering a spinal cord injury with neurological damage. Robitaille’s injuries from the accident resulted in him missing broadcast duties for the remainder of the 2009-2010 NHL season. Through months of rehabilitation from the time of accident through September of that year, doctors and Robitaille said that he was not at 100% yet. He said he felt ready and returned to his broadcast duties in time for the start of the 2010-11 NHL season with the Sabres. On October 3, 2013, it was announced that Robitaille would be partially retiring after the season and that former Sabres forward Brad May would join the crew on a limited basis before moving into Robitaille's slot in a full-time role the following year. Robitaille continued his radio work and some limited television work during his retirement.

== Personal life ==
Robitaille was born in Midland, Ontario. He lives with his wife, Isabel, in the Buffalo area; the couple also has a second home in Mexico. When not working with the Sabres, Robitaille is the vice president of development and community affairs for his wife's company, Robitaille Real Estate. He has two daughters—Sarah, a salesperson with her mother's company, and Anique, a recording artist in Toronto. Mike Robitaille is distantly related to former NHLer Luc Robitaille. Mike's 6th great-grandfather and Luc's 8th great-grandfather were brothers.

== Career statistics ==
=== Regular season and playoffs ===
			Regular season					Playoffs
Season	Team	League	GP	G	A	Pts	PIM	GP	G	A	Pts	PIM
1963–64	Kitchener Greenshirts	CJBHL	—	—	—	—	—	—	—	—	—	—
1963–64	Kitchener Rangers	OHA	1	0	0	0	0	—	—	—	—	—
1964–65	Kitchener Greenshirts	CJBHL	—	—	—	—	—	—	—	—	—	—
1964–65	Kitchener Rangers	OHA	37	2	8	10	83	—	—	—	—	—
1965–66	Kitchener Greenshirts	CJBHL	—	—	—	—	—	—	—	—	—	—
1965–66	Kitchener Rangers	OHA	1	0	0	0	0	—	—	—	—	—
1966–67	Kitchener Rangers	OHA	48	7	30	37	70	13	2	6	8	15
1967–68	Kitchener Rangers	OHA	51	20	51	71	77	14	4	10	14	34
1968–69	Omaha Knights	CHL	43	5	35	40	52	7	1	3	4	9
1969–70	New York Rangers	NHL	4	0	0	0	8	—	—	—	—	—
1969–70	Omaha Knights	CHL	64	12	46	58	115	12	2	14	16	15
1969–70	Buffalo Bisons	AHL	—	—	—	—	—	5	0	4	4	14
1970–71	New York Rangers	NHL	11	1	1	2	7	—	—	—	—	—
1970–71	Omaha Knights	CHL	13	0	9	9	32	—	—	—	—	—
1970–71	Detroit Red Wings	NHL	23	4	8	12	22	—	—	—	—	—
1971–72	Buffalo Sabres	NHL	31	2	10	12	22	—	—	—	—	—
1971–72	Cincinnati Swords	AHL	8	0	1	1	12	—	—	—	—	—
1972–73	Buffalo Sabres	NHL	65	4	17	21	40	6	0	0	0	0
1973–74	Buffalo Sabres	NHL	71	2	18	20	60	—	—	—	—	—
1974–75	Buffalo Sabres	NHL	3	0	1	1	0	—	—	—	—	—
1974–75	Vancouver Canucks	NHL	63	2	22	24	31	5	0	1	1	2
1975–76	Vancouver Canucks	NHL	71	8	19	27	69	2	0	0	0	2
1976–77	Vancouver Canucks	NHL	40	0	9	9	21	—	—	—	—	—
NHL totals			382	23	105	128	280	13	0	1	1	4
