= Brad May =

Canadian ice hockey player (born 1971)

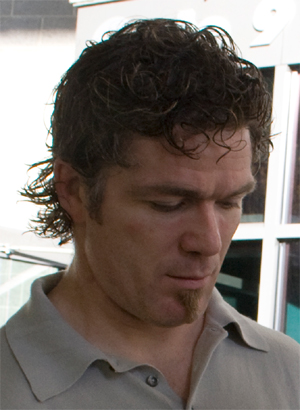
- May in 2007
- Born: November 29, 1971 (age 54) Toronto, Ontario, Canada
- Height: 6 ft 1 in (185 cm)
- Weight: 213 lb (97 kg; 15 st 3 lb)
- Position: Left wing
- Shot: Left
- Played for: Buffalo Sabres; Vancouver Canucks; Phoenix Coyotes; Colorado Avalanche; Anaheim Ducks; Toronto Maple Leafs; Detroit Red Wings
- National team: Canada
- NHL draft: 14th overall, 1990; Buffalo Sabres
- Playing career: 1991–2010
- Website: BradMay.ca

Medal record

Representing Canada

Ice hockey

World Championships
Silver medal – second place	1996 Vienna	

World Junior Championships
Gold medal – first place	1991 Saskatchewan	

Bradley Scott May (born November 29, 1971) is a Canadian former professional ice hockey player who played in the National Hockey League (NHL). In the 2006–07 season he won the Stanley Cup as a member of the Anaheim Ducks. He currently works as an NHL analyst with AT&T SportsNet Rocky Mountain. May was born in Toronto, Ontario, but grew up in Markham, Ontario.

== Playing career ==
May was drafted by the Buffalo Sabres, 14th overall, in the 1990 NHL entry draft. While not a prolific scorer, May contributed to Sabres history in his second full season with the team. In Game 4 of the opening round of the 1993 Stanley Cup playoffs against the Boston Bruins, the teams were tied at 5 and required overtime to decide a winner. May took a pass from a falling Pat LaFontaine at center ice, deked past Ray Bourque, then went on goal where he faked out Andy Moog, which caused him to fall and leave an open space for May to score on a wrist shot. The goal not only won the game but secured Buffalo's upset of the second-best team in the NHL. The goal is referred to informally as the "Mayday goal", thanks to the following call from Sabres voice Rick Jeanneret:

Here's May coming in on goal, he shoots, he scoooooores! Mayday! Mayday! Mayday! Mayday! Mayday! Brad May! Wins it in overtime! Buffalo sweeps the Bruins!

May was later traded by the Sabres to the Vancouver Canucks for forward Geoff Sanderson on February 5, 1998.

After sitting out during the 2004–05 NHL lockout, May signed with the Colorado Avalanche as an unrestricted free agent for two years on August 20, 2005. May's signing caused much conjecture and debate in Colorado due to his role played in the previous season's Todd Bertuzzi and Steve Moore incident as a Vancouver Canuck. He was later traded on February 27, 2007, to the Anaheim Ducks for goaltender Michael Wall. The Ducks went on to win the Stanley Cup that year.

On July 4, 2007, May re-signed as a free agent with Anaheim for another two years. In the 2007–08 season, May played his 900th career NHL game on November 16, 2007, and scoring his 125th career goal as the Ducks beat the Los Angeles Kings 6-3. May was selected during the year to ride on Anaheim city's float at the 2008 Tournament of Roses Parade to accompany and parade the Stanley Cup.

During the 2008–09 season on January 7, 2009, May was traded from the Ducks to the Toronto Maple Leafs in exchange for a conditional 6th round draft pick in 2010. On April 8, 2009, May played in his 1,000th career NHL game against the Buffalo Sabres. It was no coincidence that the milestone came against the Buffalo Sabres, as he was purposely sat out for the previous game.

On September 23, 2009, May was invited to try out for the Detroit Red Wings, reuniting temporarily with former Vancouver teammates Todd Bertuzzi and Dan Cloutier. May made his Red Wings debut in a pre-season game on September 25, 2009. At the start of the 2009–10 season on October 8, 2009, May then signed a one-year contract with the Red Wings. After posting 2 assists in 40 games with Red Wings May was put on waiver to clear roster room for Andreas Lilja on February 12, 2010. After clearing waivers and briefly contemplating possible retirement May decided to report to Wings AHL affiliate, the Grand Rapids Griffins, to play out the season. In an expanded role with the Griffins May scored 10 points in 17 games before he was returned to Detroit as a part of the extended squad for the playoffs.

== Post-playing career and broadcasting ==
On September 20, 2010, without an offer of a new contract, May effectively announced his retirement in accepting a position as a CBC American Hockey League analyst. Following the retirement of longtime Buffalo Sabres analyst Mike Robitaille after the 2013-14 season, May joined the Sabres broadcast crew on a limited basis before moving into Robitaille's slot in a full-time role for the NHL 2014-15 season. May was replaced on Sabres broadcasts by Martin Biron following the 2016-2017 season. Beginning with the 2017-2018 season, May served as an analyst for the Vegas Golden Knights with AT&T SportsNet Rocky Mountain, a network that is no longer on air. In 2024, May competed on the tenth season of The Amazing Race Canada with his daughter Sam, where they finished 8th out of 11 teams. Brad May currently plays recreational adult league hockey in Anaheim California in the Copper division (D League).

== Incidents ==
=== Phoenix Coyotes ===
As a member of the Phoenix Coyotes on November 11, 2000, May was suspended for 20 games for slashing Columbus Blue Jackets forward Steve Heinze in the nose with his stick. Heinze would need nine stitches, but returned to the ice quickly. After the game, May apologized to Heinze, who accepted the apology. At the time, the 20-game suspension was the fourth longest in NHL history.

In 2002, May was arrested after assaulting a police officer and disorderly conduct at a nightclub in Scottsdale, Arizona. He was consequently sued by the police officer and in December 2005, was ordered to pay damages from a civil jury.

=== Steve Moore ===
May was also noted for allegedly putting the bounty on the head of the Colorado Avalanche's Steve Moore that ultimately resulted in the Todd Bertuzzi incident that essentially ended Moore's career. May was named in a lawsuit filed by Moore, but the plaintiff was unable to prove if May did in fact put out a bounty on Moore, so the suit charges were later dropped in Colorado as the case was moved to a Canadian court.

=== Kim Johnsson ===
May was suspended for three games in the 2007 Stanley Cup Playoffs for punching Minnesota Wild defenceman Kim Johnsson in the face during the final minutes of Game Four between the Ducks and Wild. Both teams were involved in a large scrum of fighting, pushing, and shoving. May turned around and without warning punched Johnsson, who was skating towards the scrum. Johnsson was knocked unconscious for a short amount of time. Johnsson was not seriously injured, but was hospitalized, and missed Game Five of the series. The Ducks would win that game and eliminate the Wild from the Playoffs. In an interview, May said that he intended to contact Johnsson to apologize and explain what happened.

== Career statistics ==
=== Regular season and playoffs ===
			Regular season					Playoffs
Season	Team	League	GP	G	A	Pts	PIM	GP	G	A	Pts	PIM
1987–88	Markham Majors AAA	GTHL	31	22	37	59	58	—	—	—	—	—
1987–88	Markham Travelways	MetJHL	6	1	1	2	21	—	—	—	—	—
1988–89	Niagara Falls Thunder	OHL	65	8	14	22	304	17	0	1	1	55
1989–90	Niagara Falls Thunder	OHL	61	33	58	91	223	16	9	13	22	64
1990–91	Niagara Falls Thunder	OHL	34	37	32	69	93	14	11	14	25	53
1991–92	Buffalo Sabres	NHL	69	11	6	17	309	7	1	4	5	2
1992–93	Buffalo Sabres	NHL	82	13	13	26	242	8	1	1	2	14
1993–94	Buffalo Sabres	NHL	84	18	27	45	171	7	0	2	2	9
1994–95	Buffalo Sabres	NHL	33	3	3	6	87	4	0	0	0	2
1995–96	Buffalo Sabres	NHL	79	15	29	44	295	—	—	—	—	—
1996–97	Buffalo Sabres	NHL	42	3	4	7	106	10	1	1	2	32
1997–98	Buffalo Sabres	NHL	36	4	7	11	113	—	—	—	—	—
1997–98	Vancouver Canucks	NHL	27	9	3	12	41	—	—	—	—	—
1998–99	Vancouver Canucks	NHL	66	6	11	17	102	—	—	—	—	—
1999–2000	Vancouver Canucks	NHL	59	9	7	16	90	—	—	—	—	—
2000–01	Phoenix Coyotes	NHL	62	11	14	25	107	—	—	—	—	—
2001–02	Phoenix Coyotes	NHL	72	10	12	22	95	5	0	0	0	0
2002–03	Phoenix Coyotes	NHL	20	3	4	7	32	—	—	—	—	—
2002–03	Vancouver Canucks	NHL	3	0	0	0	10	14	0	0	0	15
2003–04	Vancouver Canucks	NHL	70	5	6	11	137	6	1	0	1	6
2005–06	Colorado Avalanche	NHL	54	3	3	6	82	3	0	0	0	0
2006–07	Colorado Avalanche	NHL	10	0	3	3	8	—	—	—	—	—
2006–07	Anaheim Ducks	NHL	14	0	1	1	13	18	0	1	1	28
2007–08	Anaheim Ducks	NHL	61	3	1	4	53	6	0	0	0	4
2008–09	Anaheim Ducks	NHL	20	0	5	5	28	—	—	—	—	—
2008–09	Toronto Maple Leafs	NHL	38	1	1	2	61	—	—	—	—	—
2009–10	Detroit Red Wings	NHL	40	0	2	2	66	—	—	—	—	—
2009–10	Grand Rapids Griffins	AHL	17	5	5	10	40	—	—	—	—	—
NHL totals			1,041	127	162	289	2,248	88	4	9	13	112

=== International ===
Year	Team	Event	Result	GP	G	A	Pts	PIM
1991	Canada	WJC	1st place, gold medalist(s)	7	1	0	1	2
1996	Canada	WC	2nd place, silver medalist(s)	8	0	0	0	6
Junior totals				7	1	0	1	2
Senior totals				8	0	0	0	6

== See also ==
- List of NHL players with 1,000 games played
- List of NHL players with 2,000 career penalty minutes

Awards and achievements
Preceded by Kevin Haller	Buffalo Sabres first-round draft pick 1990	Succeeded by Philippe Boucher
