= Dan Dunleavy =

Canadian sportscaster

- Born: September 27, 1965 (age 60); Toronto, Ontario, Canada
- Occupation: Sportscaster
- Years active: 1985–present
- Spouse: Brenda

Dan Dunleavy (born September 27, 1965) is a Canadian sportscaster for the Buffalo Sabres of the National Hockey League. He was formerly a sportscaster with Sportsnet 590 The Fan, and Rogers Sportsnet.

== Career ==
=== Hockey ===
Dunleavy is currently the play by play voice for the Buffalo Sabres on MSG Western New York and WGR 550 radio in Buffalo. From 2016 until 2022, Dunleavy rotated with Hall of Fame announcer Rick Jeanneret, who was to retire after the 2016–17 season. Rick changed his mind about retiring despite the agreement he and the Sabres signed with Dunleavy, leaving Dunleavy to work on a year by year time table with the hope of eventually taking over as was offered by the NHL franchise. To partially compensate, Dunleavy's role was also expanded to include filling in as studio host for Brian Duff when not substituting for Jeanneret.

Dan was about to call his third season of Toronto Maple Leaf radio play by play on The FAN590 and TSN1050 in the 2013-14 NHL season, when Buffalo approached him about taking over for Jeanneret. Dunleavy accepted, mainly because of his concerns about being split between the two Toronto stations, each owned by two of Canada's biggest multimedia conglomerates (Bell Media and Rogers Communications), both of whom also held ownership stakes in the Leafs. The Sabres signed Dunleavy to a five-year contract that expires in 2018; Dunleavy has turned down other offers during his time with Buffalo and remains in negotiations for a contract extension. On May 9, 2021, unsure of whether or not he would return to the Sabres, he posted a potential farewell message in the event that he did not renew his contract. The Sabres publicly stated that they were interested in renewing Dunleavy's agreement.

Since the last update, Dan has renewed once again as the voice of the Buffalo Sabres indefinitely.

From December 2004 through January 2011, Dan called the World Junior Hockey Championships on The FAN Radio Network, alongside Jack Miller. That run included five straight gold medal wins for Canada, two gold medal wins for the United States and one gold medal win for Russia.

In 2008 Dunleavy called the World Hockey Championships on the Fan Radio Network, working alongside former NHL'er Mark Osborne. The tournament was held between Halifax and Quebec City. Russia won gold, while Canada was the runner up.

In 2010, Dunleavy called his first NHL game for the Buffalo Sabres who were playing in Anaheim, substituting for the vacationing Rick Jeanneret; Dunleavy called his first NHL TV game for The Sabres on MSG TV in Ottawa in January 2011 and becoming a permanent rotating announcer in 2013.

In 2010, Dunleavy called his first Olympic hockey games, including the men's bronze medal game and the women's gold medal game at Canada Hockey Place (GM Place) in Vancouver. Dunleavy was the host for every Team Canada game on the FAN radio Network. Dan has also called Canadian Hockey League, American Hockey League, and National Lacrosse League games on Rogers Sportsnet. Dunleavy was the radio play by play voice for the Toronto Rock from 2000 to 2008. In 2009 Dan also served as their public address announcer during their home games.

=== Football ===
Dunleavy also served as the public address announcer at the home games for the Toronto Argonauts of the Canadian Football League.

=== Soccer ===
Dunleavy was the voice of Toronto FC of Major League Soccer on Sportsnet TV until the 2015 season.

Dunleavy served as the TV play by play voice of the Toronto Lynx of USL Soccer.

=== Olympics ===
Dunleavy was The Fan 590's Summer Olympics reporter since the 2000 Olympics, having traveled to Sydney, Australia and Athens, Greece in 2004. In 2010, Dunleavy worked the 2010 Winter Olympics in Vancouver with The FAN radio network.

=== Other ===
Dan has also served as a part-time host for Sportsnet's FIS World Cup Skiing coverage. Dunleavy's work includes being the play by play announcer for Rogers Sportsnet and Rogers TV's coverage of the Men's provincial Curling Championships. TSC Stores Tankard. on The Fan 590.

Dan joined The FAN1430 back in the summer of 1993, working part-time on weekends while working five days a week at DC 103.5 FM in Orangeville Ontario. Dunleavy was part of Bob McCown's morning show, before working alongside John Derringer and Mike Richards in the morning. In 2001 Dunleavy took over the afternoon drive Sportscasters role from Scott Ferguson, who left The FAN to join The TEAM1050 radio in Toronto. Dan would remain in that afternoon drive slot with The FAN590 until he joined the Toronto Maple Leafs to become their play by play voice alongside Joe Bowen in time for the 2011–12 season on TALK640 Radio. His run at The FAN lasted 19 years. To this day he continues to join the station to call TFC MLS soccer from time to time, as is the case with TSN1050 Radio, alongside Gareth Wheeler.

== Personal life ==
Dunleavy was born in Toronto and grew up in Georgetown, Ontario. His radio career started in Welland, Ontario in 1985 at CHOW country radio. He is an alumnus of Niagara College, where he was classmates with Rick Jeanneret's son, Chris Jeanneret.

Dan adopted 2 rescue dogs, Bandit & Timmy, and resides in Eden, New York. He met his wife, Brenda during a Sabres broadcast where she was the graphics coordinator/operator for MSG Network.
