= Pete Weber (sportscaster) =

American sportscaster

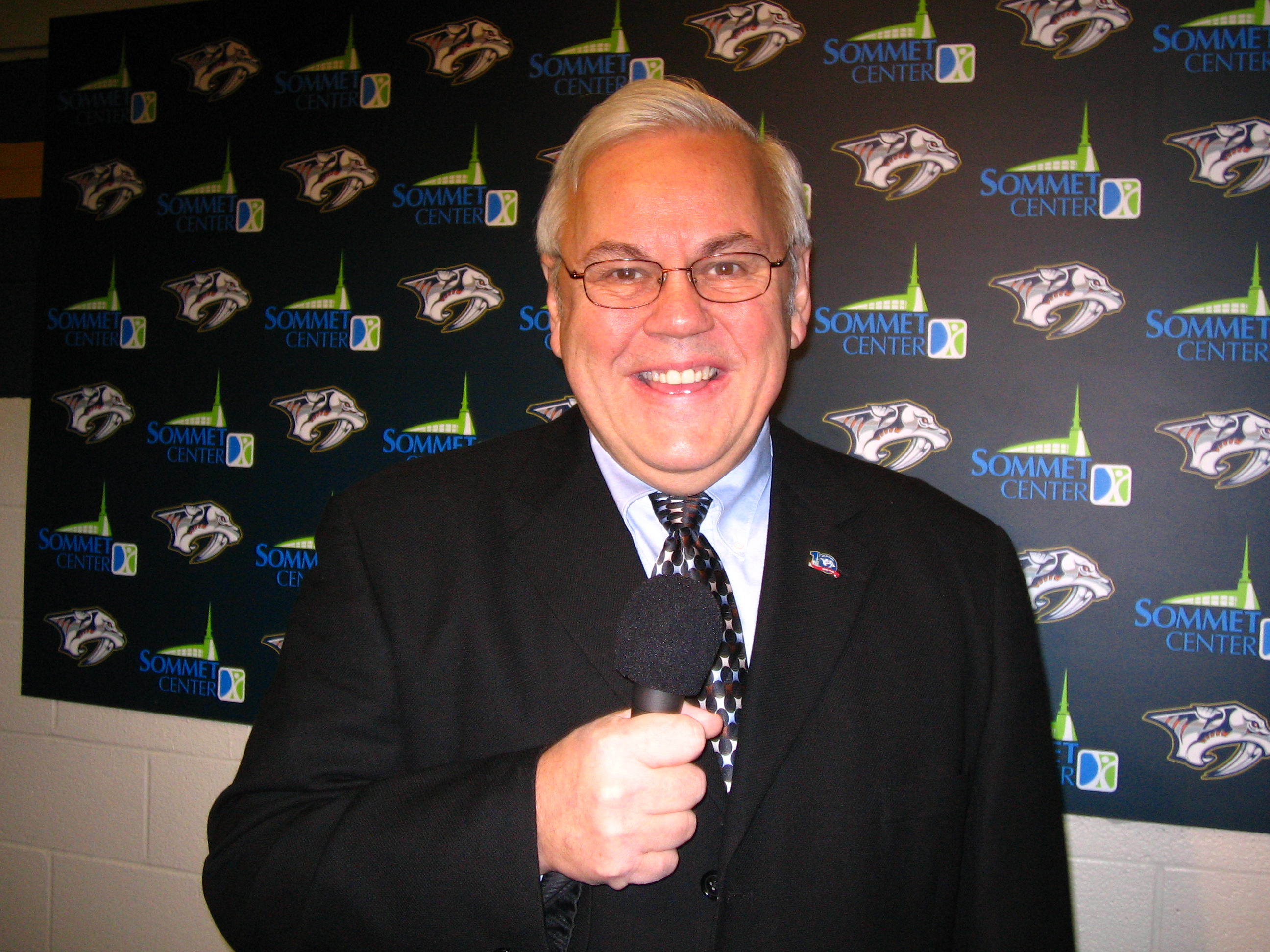
- Born: January 19, 1951 (age 75); Galesburg, Illinois, U.S.
- Sports commentary career
- Team: Nashville Predators (1998–present)
- Genres: play-by-play; color (television and radio)
- Sports: Ice hockey; American football; basketball; baseball

Pete Weber (born January 19, 1951) is the play-by-play voice of the NHL's Nashville Predators, a position he has held with the organization since the team's first season.

During the lockout that caused the entire 2004–05 NHL season to be canceled, Weber spent time following the Nashville Sounds minor league baseball team, and served as host of a weekly video on demand show about the team available on Comcast in the Nashville metropolitan area. Weber also called the 2003 and 2004 Gaylord Hotels Music City Bowl for WWTN radio. He served as co-host of "SportsNight" on WWTN & WNFN radio from July 2003 to August 2005.

In the past, Weber has served as color commentator for the NHL's Los Angeles Kings and NFL's Buffalo Bills. He was radio play-by-play voice of the NHL's Buffalo Sabres, and called NBA's Seattle SuperSonics on the SonicsSuperChannel. Pete's association with the Bills also featured his hosting of the team's pre- and post-game radio shows 1986–1993, and hosting the radio shows with GM Bill Polian, Head Coach Marv Levy, and QB Jim Kelly.

Pete's other play-by-play slots: minor league baseball's Albuquerque Dukes, Rochester Red Wings, and 13 seasons with the Buffalo Bisons. For his work with the Bisons, he was inducted into the Buffalo Baseball Hall of Fame in 1999. Pete called college action for football, basketball and hockey at University at Buffalo, basketball for St. Bonaventure University and got his start in hockey at the University of Notre Dame. His partner on Predators broadcasts for the first 15 seasons was Terry Crisp, winner of three Stanley Cups: two as a player, one as a coach.

Weber's trademark is his colorful and often quirky sense of humor while calling a game, particularly when the action is not intense at the time. He coined the phrases "The Reverse Oz Effect" regarding the antiquated Bush Stadium in Indianapolis and called the odd rise at All Sports Stadium in Oklahoma City the "Grassy Knoll", a phrase which has now been adopted for a different sports facility (Minute Maid Park in Houston). If a "make-up call" is made during a Predators game, Weber will often use phrases such as, "It's Mary Kay time here in Nashville." Weber also refuses to use any kind of objectionable material in his broadcasts, even during promotional announcements. For example, during Predators games on FSN South, Weber promoted the Best Damn Sports Show Period as "B.D.S.S.P." During the 2016 Stanley Cup playoffs, he told listeners to "Go Ape" to celebrate sudden death wins.

Weber, born in 1951, is a native of Galesburg, Illinois. He and his wife Claudia currently reside in Nashville, Tennessee. In February 2014, he was hospitalized after suffering a heart attack. In 2020, Weber was named the Tennessee Sportscaster of the Year for the record 8th time.

At the start of the 2024-25 season, Pete Weber reduced his schedule to only home games, with the exception of playoff games and specialty games, such as 2025 games in Sweeden. Max Herz was named play-by-play broadcaster for road games.

On November 1, 2025, Weber and Crisp were inducted into the Predators' Golden Hall, recognizing their longtime contributions to the team.
