= Kevin Sylvester (American broadcaster) =

American sports media personality (born c. 1973)

- Born: Waterloo, New York, U.S.
- Sports commentary career
- Teams: Buffalo Sabres, Buffalo Bills
- Genres: Play-by-play, pre-game, post-game
- Sports: Ice hockey, golf

Kevin Sylvester (born c.1973) is an American sports media personality, currently employed as a radio broadcaster for the PGA Tour.

Sylvester had an 11-year association with the Buffalo Sabres. He succeeded Josh Mora as the Sabres' studio host during the 2005–06 Buffalo Sabres season and was the alternate play-by-play broadcaster during the 2011–12 season, handling most of the club's road games. His partner in the broadcast booth was veteran broadcaster Danny Gare, whose number has been retired by the Sabres. Since the 2008–09 season, he has been a substitute announcer for longtime play-by-play man Rick Jeanneret, who has called the team's games since the 1971–72 season. On June 18, 2012, Sylvester's new show, Sabres Hockey Hotline, debuted from the Sabres Store inside the First Niagara Center.

Sylvester left the Sabres organization on April 8, 2016, to join the PGA.

Before joining the Sabres, Sylvester was a morning host at WGR. He also serves as color commentator on UB Bulls men's basketball, with Paul Peck as the play-by-play man, on broadcasts carried by ESPN3. Sylvester also hosts two television series for WGRZ: This Weekend, a weekend events magazine, and Tee 2 Green, about golf. Sylvester is also the author of the 44-page book The Married Man's Guide to Golf. Along with Peck, Sylvester was scheduled to launch Buffalo Sports Page, an Internet portal and corresponding radio show on WECK, in August 2017.

Sylvester is a 1991 graduate of Waterloo High School, and a 1995 alumnus of the State University of New York at Fredonia.

== See also ==
- List of current National Hockey League broadcasters
- List of Buffalo Sabres broadcasters
