= Ted Darling =

Canadian sports announcer (1935–1996)

- Born: Edgar Lee Darling; June 9, 1935; Kingston, Ontario, Canada
- Died: December 19, 1996 (aged 61); Lockport, New York, U.S.
- Sports commentary career
- Team: Buffalo Sabres
- Genre: play-by-play
- Sport: Ice hockey

Edgar Lee "Ted" Darling (June 9, 1935 – December 19, 1996) was a Canadian-American sports announcer. He is best known as the original "Voice of the Buffalo Sabres" ice hockey team for twenty-two seasons, calling the team's games on television from the team's inaugural season in 1970 to 1991. The title was originally bestowed by Sabres defenceman Jim Schoenfeld.

== Career ==
Before his work with the Sabres, he hosted Hockey Night in Canada telecasts from Montreal. Darling won the Sabres play-by-play job after submitting an audition tape of him calling a fictitious Sabres broadcast.

Darling was close friends with Rick Jeanneret, with whom he rotated television and radio play-by-play duties from 1971 onward. For games that were not televised, Darling and Jeanneret would often work as a tandem, though neither had playing experience typical of most color commentators.

In October 1991, Darling was diagnosed with Pick's disease, an Alzheimer's-like degenerative illness, and thus, was on medical leave from October 16 to November 20. He returned to call 6 more games before being relieved of his duties by the executive producer of Sabres broadcasts, Paul Wieland, on December 12, 1991. Darling called a total of 11 games during the 1991–92 season. He was brought back, however, as a studio analyst for games on WUTV in the 1992–93 season before announcing his retirement. The illness took a significant toll on his health and after a five-year battle with the illness, he died on December 19, 1996, at the age of 61.

Darling's son, Joel Darling, is an executive producer with Hockey Night in Canada, having begun his broadcast career as a gofer under his father and Jeanneret.

== Awards and accolades ==
- Inducted into the Hockey Hall of Fame in 1994.
- Inducted into the Greater Buffalo Sports Hall of Fame in 1995.
- Inducted into the Buffalo Broadcasters Association Hall of Fame in 2002.
- The press box at KeyBank Center is named the "Ted Darling Memorial Press Box" in his honor.

== Memorable calls ==
When the Great Lakes Blizzard of 1977 hit the city of Buffalo, Darling called a game between the Sabres and Montreal Canadiens at the Montreal Forum from his apartment—phoning in his commentary while watching the action on his television.

Preceded by Tim Ryan	Stanley Cup Final American network television play-by-play announcer 1976 (with Marv Albert; Darling called Game 2)	Succeeded by Dan Kelly
