= Rick Jeanneret =

Canadian broadcaster (1942–2023)

- Born: John Richard Jeanneret; July 23, 1942; St. Catharines, Ontario, Canada
- Died: August 17, 2023 (aged 81); Niagara Falls, Ontario, Canada
- Occupation: Announcer
- Years active: 1963–2022
- Spouse: Sandra Dewberry
- Children: Mark; Chris
- Sports commentary career
- Team: Buffalo Sabres
- Genre: Play-by-play announcer
- Sport: Ice hockey

John Richard Jeanneret (July 23, 1942 – August 17, 2023) was a Canadian television and radio personality best known as the play-by-play announcer for the National Hockey League's Buffalo Sabres and its broadcast network, the Sabres Hockey Network for 51 years. Having started with the team on radio during the team's second season in 1971–72, and ending his career after the 2021–22 season, he was the longest-tenured play-by-play announcer with a single team in NHL history. He moved to television during the 1995–96 season and began doubling both television and radio play-by-play duties during the 1997–98 season. He was known as "RJ" within the Sabres organization and by close associates.

== Career ==
Jeanneret's career began off air at CHUM in Toronto. To get on the air, Jeanneret took classes from the Midwest Broadcasting School, a Chicago-based institution that Jeanneret described as a "crash course" in broadcasting. Upon graduation, he was hired as a disc jockey at CKLY in Lindsay, Ontario. He was then hired by CHVC, later CJRN in Niagara Falls.

In 1963, Jeanneret took over the play-by-play of a Niagara Falls Flyers Junior A hockey game for the regular announcer, Edd Felstead, who had become sick. Jeanneret became the color analyst the following season before assuming full-time play by play radio duties in 1965. During the 1960s and early 1970s, Rick did several radio advertisements for local Niagara Falls hardware store Buildall. Jeanneret also called Buffalo Bisons (AHL) road games in 1969–70.

In 1971, Jeanneret began working for the Sabres after Dave Hodge, the play-by-play man for the team's first season, had unexpectedly won Hockey Night in Canada duties over the frontrunner for the position, future Jeopardy! host Alex Trebek. In an era before regional sports networks when most hockey games were untelevised, Jeanneret and Ted Darling often worked as a tandem and became very close personal friends. Over the years, he was partnered with a series of color commentators, including Jim Lorentz (his longest-running partner), personal friend Harry Neale, and Rob Ray.

From 1984 until 1992, he did the Sabres' play-by-play in addition to being a popular early-morning disc jockey at the now-defunct CJRN-AM in Niagara Falls, Ontario. In 1992, he chose to retire from CJRN and concentrate solely on the Sabres. "I had enough of two jobs. I finished the game, came home and had to be up by 4 a.m.," he said.

Jeanneret helped close the Aud on the final night of the regular season in 1996 with an emotional tribute to his colleague Ted Darling, who was the voice of the Sabres from 1970 until the worsening effects from Pick's Disease forced him to retire in the midst of the 1991–92 season. "I wish that standing next to me right now would be Ted Darling," said Jeanneret from the ice surface in a postgame ceremony. He closed out with, "See you in September, one block in that direction," pointing toward the new arena, then dubbed the Crossroads Arena and now called KeyBank Center. Jeanneret consistently declined to accept the title of "voice of the Buffalo Sabres" out of deference to Darling.

In 2005, Jeanneret and the Sabres released a CD that collected some of his most memorable calls. Proceeds from the CD, which was titled Roll the Highlight Film, went to charity. It was followed up in 2006 with Top Shelf (named after his signature call, "Top Shelf, where momma hides the cookies!"), a similarly themed DVD.

=== Later years ===
Each year from the 2004–05 NHL lockout onward, Jeanneret reupped with the Sabres on short-term deals out of concern for his age and health. Jeanneret's contract was extended in 2007 through the 2008–09 NHL season. It was further extended in 2008 through the 2009–10 season. He was back for the 2010–11 season along with Neale. During these seasons, Jeanneret did not broadcast games while the Sabres had west coast road trips and a home game against the Boston Bruins. This most recently was from December 27, 2010, through January 8, 2011. He was also off when the Sabres played the Ottawa Senators in Ottawa on January 25, 2011. During Jeanneret's vacation, his son Mark and Kevin Sylvester filled in on play-by-play. The idea for Jeanneret to take time off during west-coast road games during these seasons was that of former managing partner Larry Quinn.

On May 26, 2011, the Sabres announced that Jeanneret (and Neale) would cover only home games and 10 to 15 road games for the Sabres in the 2011–12 NHL season. This was in preparation for Jeanneret's pending retirement, in which Jeanneret stated that he almost retired after the 2010–11 season, but sought the reduced schedule instead. Studio host Kevin Sylvester was tabbed to call those road games, along with Danny Gare. Jeanneret indicated he would take up an increased workload in 2012–13, although he would stop short of a full-time broadcast.

On June 27, 2012, Jeanneret announced that he would return to the broadcast booth full-time during the 2012–13 season, this time with Rob Ray serving as color commentator in addition to the bench reporter role Ray had served in for previous seasons. Jeanneret indicated it would be his last full season with the team, and the decision may have been influenced by the labor dispute that shortened the length of the season. Furthermore, Jeanneret missed the first four games of the season due to illness; he ended up calling 44 games for the Sabres in the shortened 2013 season. Jeanneret confirmed he would return for the 2013–14 season (he had signed a two-year contract the previous year), but did not make a solid commitment to how many games he would call in that season. Most indications were that Jeanneret would call 55 to 65 games for the 2013–14 season.

Jeanneret announced his intent to slowly phase out of the Sabres play-by-play job over the course of three years. By then, Dan Dunleavy had been chosen as Jeanneret's successor and slowly took over play-by-play duties, first as the substitute, then permanently starting in 2022. Jeanneret called 47 games in 2014–15 and called 41 games in 2015–16; as of 2014, he still intended on retiring in 2016 but did not entirely rule out changing his mind. Indeed, Jeanneret would sign an agreement to call another half-season of games in 2016–17.

On July 1, 2014, Jeanneret was diagnosed with stage III throat cancer, which required Jeanneret to miss part of the 2014–15 NHL season. Although he initially sought treatment in his native Canada due to Canada's universal single-payer health care system, he later sought American treatment (coincidentally, from the same doctor that also treated Buffalo Bills quarterback Jim Kelly) due to his stronger personal attachment with the United States after four decades of work in the country. On November 7, 2014, Jeanneret announced that following a CAT scan he was clear of cancer. He returned to broadcasting Sabres games eight days later on Saturday, November 15, calling the first period of the game against the Maple Leafs.

In April 2018, Jeanneret said that he was leaning toward returning for the 2018–19 season, but he was not certain because of his age and possible health complications (in addition to the cancer battle, he'd also had a pacemaker installed).

Jeanneret appeared in a commercial for Molson Canadian, giving a call for a pick-up pond hockey game.

Jeanneret is the play-by-play announcer for ICE's Super Chexx arcade machines.

On December 22, 2018, during the third period in a home game against the Anaheim Ducks, Jeanneret suffered an acute medical emergency and abruptly cut out of the broadcast, leaving color commentator Rob Ray and on-site studio host Brian Duff to call play-by-play for the remainder of the game. Almost immediately, fans watching the broadcast or listening to the game took to the Sabres' Twitter page, expressing worry and concern for Jeanneret and asking for updates. Buffalo News sports commentator Mike Harrington was at the game and tweeted about seeing Jeanneret being carried out of the arena on a stretcher - prompting hundreds of further tweets from fans at the Sabres' page. Jeanneret had shown no signs of illness immediately prior to the game. In an interview the next day, Jeanneret, who was still recovering in the hospital, noted that the emergency was not heart-related and that he had overheated prior to losing consciousness (something that he noted was unusual since the arena is usually cold, although Jeanneret had worn a Santa Claus suit for an extended portion of the evening); he did not miss any more of his scheduled play-by-play duties.

Jeanneret stated in April 2019, as the 2018–19 season wound down, that he was going to take much more time to decide whether he would return. He expressed major disappointment in the Sabres play that season, noting he had never seen a team collapse the way the Sabres had that year. He eventually decided to return. In April 2020, in an interview with the Buffalo News, Jeanneret noted he would likely retire following the 2020–21 season, marking his 50th anniversary with the Sabres franchise. Jeanneret, who called 20 games that season, was set to have his contract expire during the 2021 offseason at the same time as Rob Ray and Dan Dunleavy's; while Sabres spokesman Scott Preisler stated that they intended to bring Ray and Dunleavy back, he made no such commitment to Jeanneret; negotiations for any potential return would not begin until after the season ended.

On August 20, 2021, Jeanneret announced he would retire following the 2021–22 season, during which he would call a total of 20 home games. He stated that he was unwilling to retire from the team during a season in which there were no fans in attendance, even if the 50-year mark had been a logical milestone. Jeanneret called his final game on April 29, 2022, a 3–2 overtime win over the Chicago Blackhawks. His last play call announced was for the game winning goal for Casey Mittelstadt: "Casey Casey at the bat, Casey Casey Mittelstadt."

== Personal life and death ==
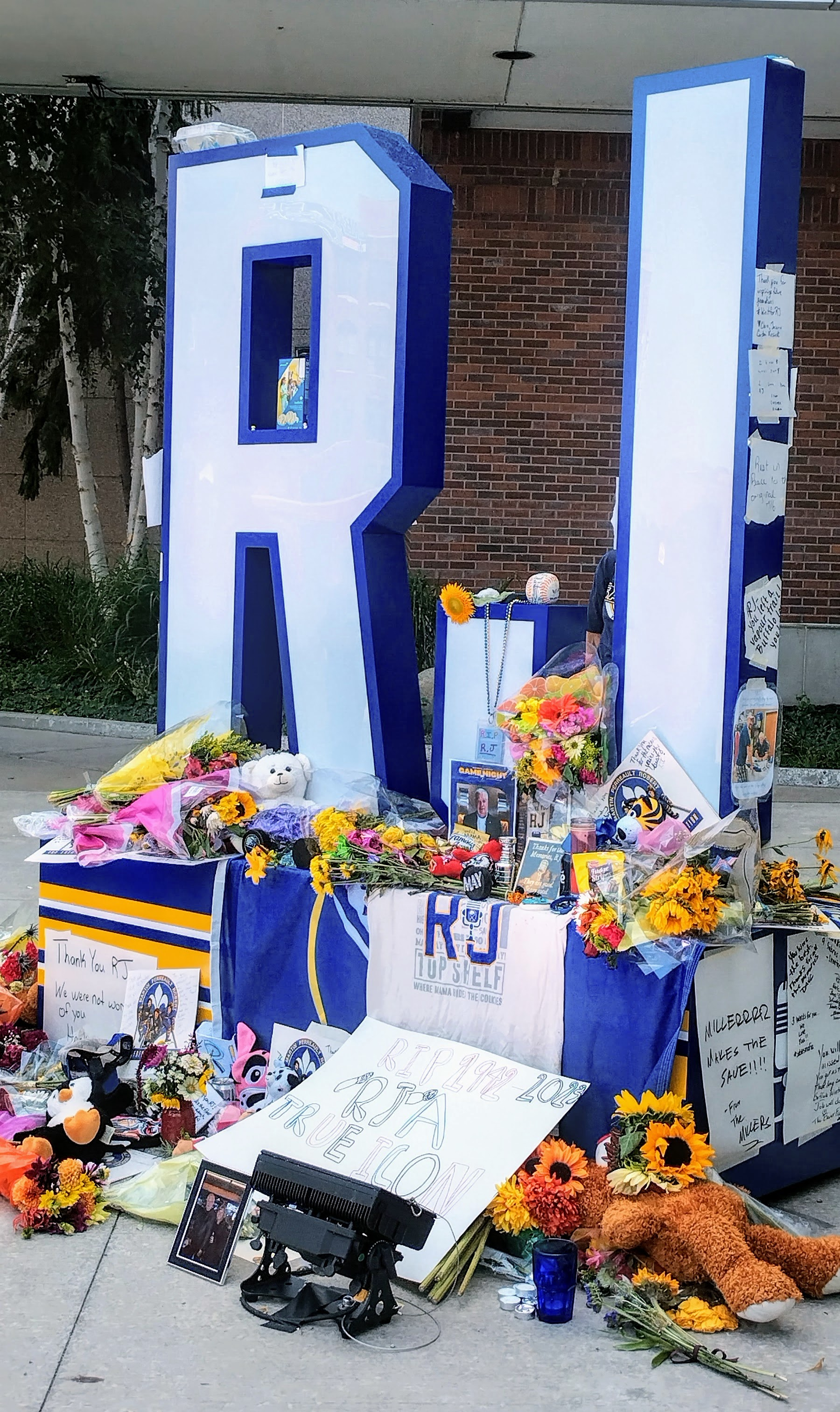
A memorial to Jeanneret, set up by the Sabres on August 18, 2023

Jeanneret was a Canadian citizen of Swiss descent, who self-identified as Canadian-American. He was born on July 23, 1942, in St. Catharines, Ontario, and raised in Terrace Bay, Ontario. He was known for his energetic delivery (especially during big plays and fights), colorful player nicknames, passionate goal calls, and his trademark suspenders worn on air and uncanny resemblance to late comedian Rodney Dangerfield.

Jeanneret resided in Niagara Falls, Ontario, with his wife, Sandra. He had two sons, Mark and Chris, and a stepdaughter, Shelly. His son, Mark Jeanneret, is the events coordinator for the Erie Sports Commission in Erie, Pennsylvania, where he used to be the play-by-play announcer for the Erie Otters of the OHL. He also substituted for Rick as an announcer for the Buffalo Sabres games against the Calgary Flames and Edmonton Oilers on December 27 and 28, 2010. Chris teaches Radio Broadcasting at Niagara College in Welland, Ontario. Shelly is a wedding, portrait and event photographer in Niagara Falls.

Jeanneret died on August 17, 2023, from multiple organ failure, which his family stated had begun in 2021 during his final season with the team. He was 81.

== The Sabres Showdown ==
On April 9, 2001, as part of a promotion on radio station WNSA (at the time the Sabres' flagship station), Jeanneret called a fictional game known as the "Sabres Showdown." The fictional matchup was simulated on the NHL 2001 video game, and was said to be a matchup between the 1974–75 Buffalo Sabres and the 1998–99 Sabres, both of whom had been to the Stanley Cup finals. The game was said to have taken place at Buffalo Memorial Auditorium, classic Sabres audio clips were played during intermission, and WNSA purposely held out any regular game staff from the commentary who had actually played on the 1974–75 team so as to make it seem as if they were actually playing the game. (For instance, color commentator Jim Lorentz was replaced by Mike Robitaille, who played for the Sabres in 1974–75 but had been traded before the playoffs, and WNSA hosts filled in other positions.) The 1975 team won the game thanks to Gilbert Perreault's game-winning shootout goal.

In all actuality, many of the members of the 1974–75 squad are still together, working for the Sabres organization and playing occasionally for the Buffalo Sabres Alumni Hockey Team.

== Awards and accolades ==
Jeanneret, along with former Sabre Dale Hawerchuk were inducted into the Buffalo Sabres Hall of Fame on November 8, 2011.

On June 6, 2012, the Sabres announced that Jeanneret would be inducted into the Greater Buffalo Sports Hall of Fame.

On June 8, 2012, the Sabres announced that Jeanneret would be given the Foster Hewitt Memorial Award and thus be inducted into the Hockey Hall of Fame. He was inducted on November 12, 2012.

Jeanneret was inducted into the Buffalo Broadcasting Hall of Fame on September 20, 2012.

The Bare Knuckle Boxing Hall of Fame inducted Jeanneret as an 'honorary inductee' on July 7, 2018, on the grounds of his calling blow-by-blow on in-game fights, which the Hall's committee considered the closest modern equivalent to bare-knuckle boxing.

The Sabres honored Jeanneret with a ceremony on April 1, 2022. A banner bearing his name was added to the rafters of KeyBank Center. His banner joined those of Sabres alumni Gilbert Perreault, Rick Martin, Rene Robert, Tim Horton, Danny Gare, Pat LaFontaine and Dominik Hasek, and original owners Seymour H. Knox III and Northrup R. Knox. https://www.nhl.com/sabres/news/sabres-honor-rick-jeanneret-banner-ceremony-rj-night-332530058
