= Seymour Knox =

Seymour Knox is the name of:

- Seymour H. Knox I (1861–1915), entrepreneur of Woolworth's stores in Buffalo, NY
- Seymour H. Knox II (1898–1990), art enthusiast from Buffalo, NY
  - Portrait of Seymour H. Knox, by Andy Warhol, 1985
- Seymour H. Knox III (1926–1996), hockey team owner from Buffalo, NY
- Seymour M. Knox, member of the Wisconsin State Assembly

== See also ==
- Knox (disambiguation)
