= Seymour H. Knox II =

American philanthropist (1898–1990)

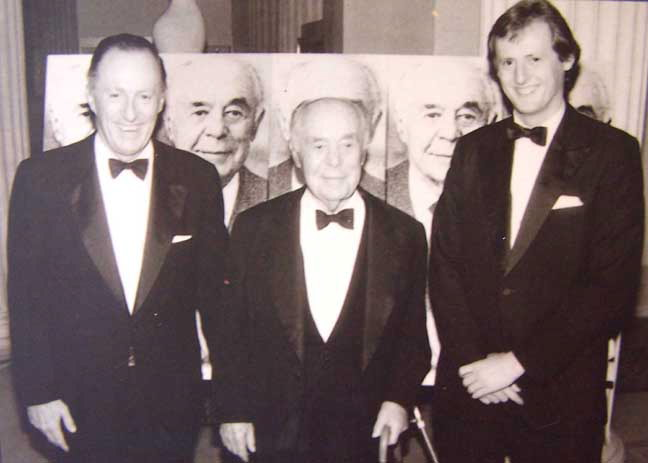
- Seymour Knox III, II, and IV in front of Portrait of Seymour H. Knox

Chancellor of the University of Buffalo Acting
- In office July 1 – August 31, 1954
- Preceded by: T.R. McConnell
- Succeeded by: Clifford Furnas

Personal details
- Born: September 1, 1898 Buffalo, New York, US
- Died: September 27, 1990 (aged 92)
- Spouse: Helen Northrup
- Children: Seymour Horace Knox III; Northrup Rand Knox
- Parents: Seymour Horace Knox I; Grace Millard
- Education: Nichols School; Hotchkiss School
- Alma mater: Yale University (1920)
- Occupation: Banker
- Awards: National Medal of Arts (1986)

Seymour Horace Knox II (September 1, 1898 – September 27, 1990) was a Buffalo, New York, philanthropist and polo player. The son of wealthy businessman Seymour H. Knox, he owned a palatial home designed by C. P. H. Gilbert.

== Early life ==
He was born on September 1, 1898, to Grace Millard Knox and Seymour H. Knox I, who merged his chain of five-and-dime stores with those of his first cousins, Frank Winfield Woolworth and Charles Woolworth, to form the F. W. Woolworth Company in 1912. Knox was one of three surviving children born to Seymour and Grace. His elder sisters were Dorothy Virginia Knox and Marjorie Millard Knox. Knox attended Nichols School in Buffalo and the Hotchkiss School in Connecticut. In 1917, as a passenger, he was in a crash landing in Buffalo of a seaplane piloted by a friend, and suffered a fractured skull, but he fully recovered. He was a 1920 graduate of Yale University. At Yale he was a member of Delta Kappa Epsilon.

== Career ==
In 1921, upon graduation from Yale, Knox became a Marine Midland Bank director. In 1926, he became vice-president, followed by chairman in 1943 until 1970. He joined the F. W. Woolworth board in 1926 and was chairman from 1943 until reaching the mandatory retirement age forty-five years later in 1971. He became Chairman of The University at Buffalo's governing Council from 1950 to 1969. Knox served on the board of directors of Marine Midland Bank, F. W. Woolworth Company, New York Central Railroad, Penn Central Railroad, and the American Steamship Company.

=== Art ===
In 1926, he joined the board of Albright Art Gallery. From the beginning, he was a leader in the modernism movement and in modern cultural life in Buffalo. He spent 60 years working with the Buffalo Fine Arts Academy and by 1939, he was President of the academy. He bolstered the Contemporary Abstractionism collection during his tenure. He is best known for his 1962 addition to the Albright Art Gallery, designed by Skidmore, Owings & Merrill. After the completion of the addition, the Gallery was renamed the Albright-Knox Art Gallery in his honor. He donated more than 160 works for the new wing, and over 700 pieces over his lifetime. He is said to be in part responsible for the popularity of Jackson Pollock. Under his direction, the Gallery became the first museum to purchase a Clyfford Still, one of the first to purchase a Henry Moore, and as leading champions of Abstractionism, they acquired selections from almost every major abstractionist. In 1965 he was appointed to a commission to choose modern art works for the Governor Nelson A. Rockefeller Empire State Plaza Art Collection in Albany, NY.

== Personal life ==
In 1923, he married Helen Northrup, who had attended the Albright Art School. They lived in a mansion at 57 Oakland Place in Buffalo, designed by C. P. H. Gilbert. Construction on the home began in 1924 and was a gift to the couple from Knox's mother, who lived nearby at 800 Delaware Avenue. Together, they had two sons:

- Seymour H. Knox III (1926–1996)
- Northrup Rand Knox (1928–1998)

Both sons were the original principal owners of the Buffalo Sabres NHL team. Knox was the subject of the 1985 Andy Warhol painting "Portrait of Seymour H. Knox". He also donated significant funds to the Yale University Art Gallery, in New Haven, Connecticut, which both the Seymour H. Knox Jr., Curator of Modern and Contemporary Art and Seymour H. Knox Jr., Curator of European and Contemporary Art positions bear his name. He was an avid polo player and led his Aurora team to the United States Championship in 1932, later touring South America, and winning a tournament in Europe.

Knox died on September 27, 1990, and was eulogized in Congress by U.S. Representative Bill Paxon.

=== Honors ===
In 1986, he was awarded the National Medal of Arts by President Ronald Reagan for his contributions to the arts in Buffalo and the nation.

== See also ==
- Albright-Knox Art Gallery
- Knox Farm State Park
- National Medal of Arts
