= Swados =

Swados is a surname. Notable people with the surname include:

- Elizabeth Swados (1951–2016), American writer, composer, musician, and theatre director
- Harvey Swados (1920–1972), American author
- Robert O. Swados (1919–2012), American attorney and businessman
