= E. P. Charlton & Company =

E.P. Charlton & Co.
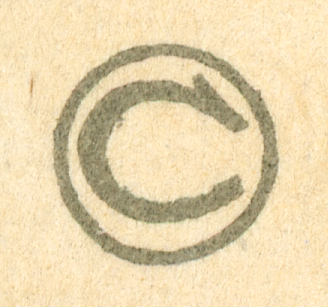

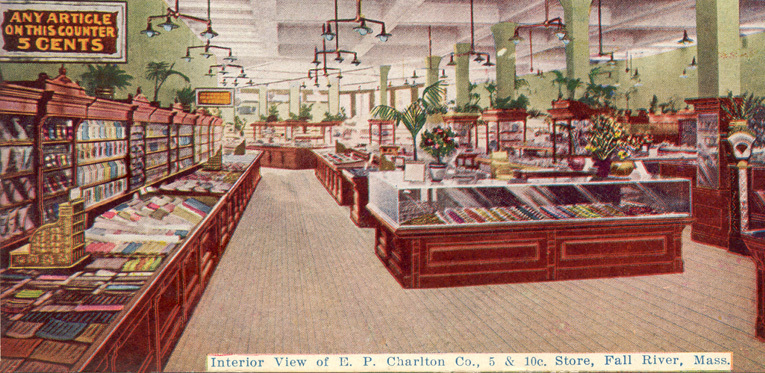
- Interior of an E. P. Charlton & Company 5 and 10 cent store. Post card circa 1908
- Industry: Retail
- Founded: 1890; 135 years ago in Fall River, Massachusetts, United States
- Founders: Earle Perry Charlton, Seymour H. Knox
- Defunct: 1912
- Fate: Merged to become F.W. Woolworth Company

E. P. Charlton & Company, also known as E. P. Charlton Company, E. P. Charlton, or simply Charlton's was an American chain of five and ten cent stores owned by Earle Perry Charlton, which merged with several associated brands to create the F. W. Woolworth Company in 1912.

== Establishment and early years ==
Beginning in 1890, Charlton and his partner, Seymour H. Knox, a cousin of retailer Frank W. Woolworth, established a chain of stores under the name of "Knox & Charlton Five and Ten Cent Store." The chain operated as part of a syndicate established by Woolworth, allowing for friendly competition, so long as the individual owners followed Woolworth's principles. The first store opened in Fall River, Massachusetts on February 22, 1890. Between 1892 and 1895, three more locations opened, in Hartford and New Britain, Connecticut, and Lowell, Massachusetts.

In 1896, the two men decided to go their separate ways, with Knox acquiring the store in Lowell, and Charlton retaining the other three. By 1899, Charlton had opened nine more stores in New England, with new locations in Hartford, Danbury, and Meriden, Connecticut, Brockton, Fitchburg, Gloucester, Lawrence, and New Bedford, Massachusetts, and Lewiston, Maine. But realizing that continued expansion in New England would bring him into direct competition with other members of the Woolworth syndicate, Charlton sold his new stores to Frank Woolworth, using the capital to finance the opening of several stores in Canada.

== Expansion in Canada and the west ==
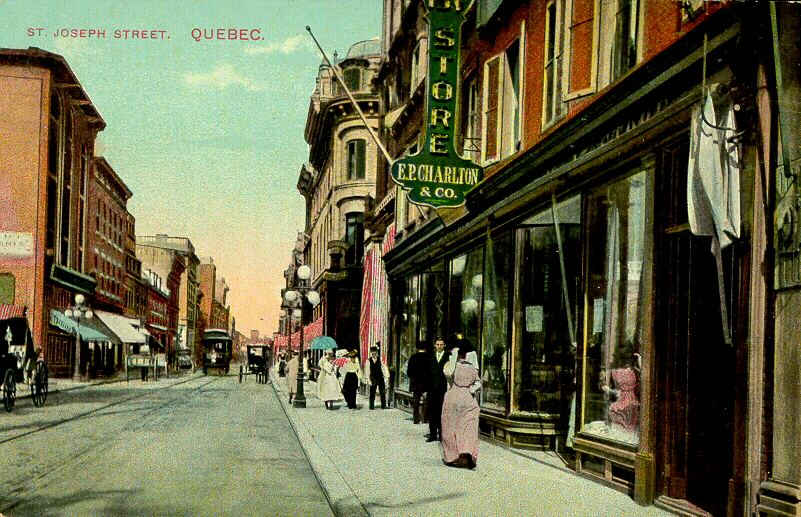
E. P. Charlton Store on St. Joseph Street, Quebec

Over the next several years, Charlton opened three stores in Montreal and one in Ottawa, followed by eight more west of the Rocky Mountains, which featured an expanded pricing scheme, of five, ten, and fifteen cent items. Beginning in 1905, Charlton opened stores in Los Angeles and San Francisco, and four more locations in California, as well as in Tacoma, Washington, and Sherbrooke, Quebec.

In 1908, Charlton's headquarters moved to a new building on South Main Street in Fall River, near the location of the original store. Dubbed the "Charlton Block," the new store was lit by electric lights, and featured mahogany counters like those favored by Knox and Woolworth. The chain continued to expand in the west, with stores in Salt Lake City and Ogden, Utah, and Butte, Montana. Goods were supplied by Woolworth, and sold well due to the low, fixed pricing. By 1911, the top earning store was the South Broadway location in Los Angeles, earning $370,000 per annum, while six other stores earned over $150,000.

== Consolidation with Woolworth ==
By 1912, E. P. Charlton & Company operated fifty-eight stores throughout the United States and Canada. That year, Frank Woolworth persuaded the other members of his syndicate to consolidate as the F. W. Woolworth Company. Frank, who owned more stores than the other five members combined, became president of the new company, while the others became directors and vice presidents. S. H. Knox & Co. contributed ninety-eight stores in the United States, and thirteen in Canada; Fred M. Kirby, who had been a business partner of Woolworth's since the 1880s, had ninety-six; Frank's brother, Charles Sumner Woolworth, had fifteen stores; while William Moore, whose stores had given Frank and Charles their start in retail, contributed two. Charlton's western holdings gave F. W. Woolworth a nationwide reach in both the United States and Canada. He became a senior vice president, and earned $6,500,000 from the merger.

With the consolidation of the six brands under the Woolworth name, F. W. Woolworth & Company operated five hundred and ninety-six stores, with its headquarters at the newly constructed Woolworth Building in New York. The company prospered for most of the twentieth century, before increased competition in the discount retail market caused it to focus on specialty brands. Woolworth's-branded stores were closed throughout the 1990s, while the company focused on athletic apparel, and particularly its Foot Locker brand. The last Woolworth stores were closed in 1997, as the company changed its name, first to Venator, then Foot Locker, Inc.

== Legacy ==
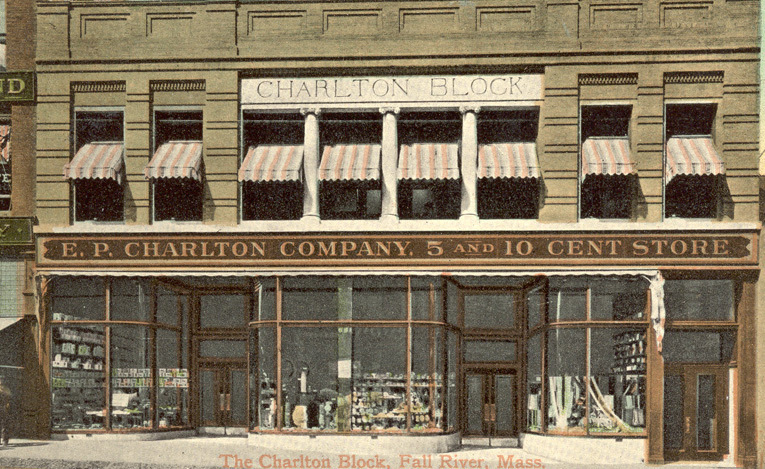
The Charlton Block, Fall River, Mass.

Although the E. P. Charlton brand disappeared from retail after the creation of F. W. Woolworth & Company, the Fall River Woolworth's maintained its prominent storefront "E. P. Charlton Company" signage until 1970. Earle Charlton devoted his time and energy to the Charlton Mill, a factory he had built at Fall River in 1909, and which operated until the 1950s. Charlton died in 1930, leaving a considerable amount to the Charlton Trust, which benefited local charities in the Fall River area; today he is commemorated by the Charlton Memorial Hospital.
