= Seymour H. Knox I =

American businessman (1861–1915)

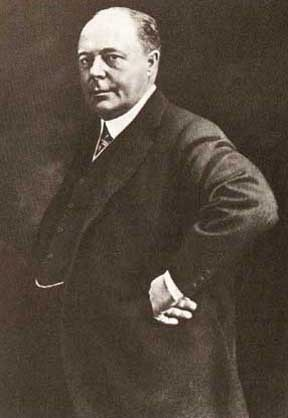
- Seymour H. Knox I
- Born: April 11, 1861; Russell, New York, U.S.
- Died: May 17, 1915 (aged 54); Buffalo, New York, U.S.
- Resting place: Forest Lawn Cemetery, Buffalo, New York
- Occupation: Businessman
- Spouse: Gracia Millard Knox
- Children: 4, including Seymour H. Knox II
- Relatives: Seymour H. Knox III (grandson); Northrup R. Knox (grandson); Frank Winfield Woolworth (cousin); Charles Sumner Woolworth (cousin)

Seymour Horace Knox I (April 11, 1861 – May 17, 1915) was an American businessman from Buffalo, New York, who made his fortune in five-and-dime stores. He merged his more than 100 stores with those of his first cousins, Frank Winfield Woolworth and Charles Sumner Woolworth, to form the F. W. Woolworth Company. He went on to hold prominent positions in the merged company as well as Marine Trust Co. He was the father of Seymour H. Knox II and grandfather of Seymour H. Knox III and Northrup Knox, the co-founders of the Buffalo Sabres in the National Hockey League.

== Early life ==
He was born on April 11, 1861, in Russell, St. Lawrence County, New York. His father was James Horace Knox, a farmer married to Jane E. McBrier. James' grandfather had fought in the American Revolution. William Knox was the first of this line of Knoxes to come to Massachusetts from Belfast, Ireland, in 1737.

Seymour attended the Russell district school and at fifteen, though he had never gone to high school, began to teach in school himself.

== Career ==
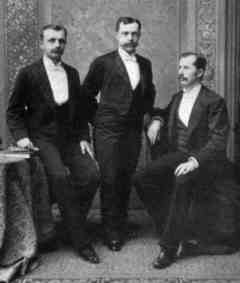
Knox (center) with Frank and Charles Woolworth

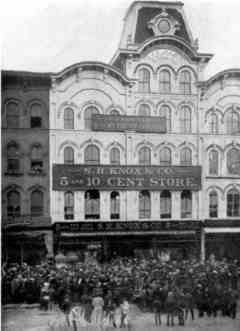
Pioneering Urban 5 and dime in Detroit

At seventeen, he moved to Hart, Michigan, where for a few years he worked as a salesclerk. Then he left for Reading, Pennsylvania, where he entered into a partnership with his first cousins. He later donated the Knox Memorial Central School Building (dedicated on July 30, 1913) that served the town until the Knox Memorial School and Edwards Central School merged. He initially became a partner with the Woolworths by jointly opening a Woolworth & Knox store with them in Reading on September 20, 1884, using his entire life savings. The Reading store's first several hours had no sales. However, after the partners took a lunchtime walk, they returned at 1:30 to find the local factory workers had been let out at 1:00—with their paychecks. Sales were brisk, and the partners never looked back. His second store, in Newark, New Jersey, was short lived, but his partnership thrived nonetheless. The third venture, in Erie, Pennsylvania, enabled them to buy out the Newark lease. He partnered with Frank to open the first Buffalo store, at 409 Main Street, on October 13, 1888.

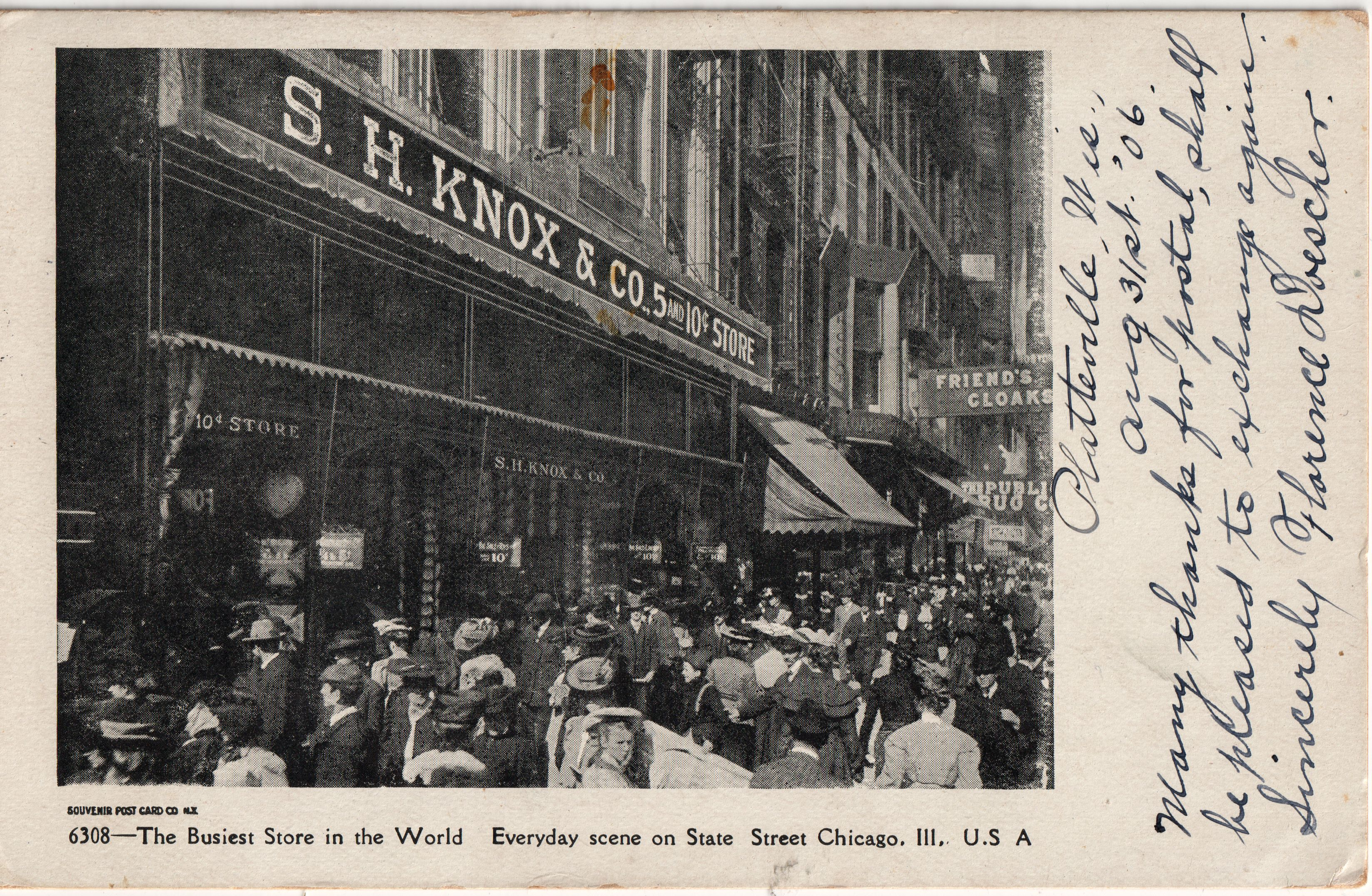
Crowds outside S. H. Knox & Co 5 and 10 cent store, Chicago, circa 1906

By 1889, he was able to buy out his cousins. He maintained a collegial business relationship with his cousins after the buyout. In fact, he bought Woolworth merchandise at wholesale and sometimes traded in competition. He formed another brief partnership with another friendly rival, Earle Perry Charlton, from 1889 to 1895, opening his Buffalo "S.H. Knox Co." 5 and 10 Cent Store in 1890. In 1890, he made established headquarters in the Buffalo store. Sources disagree on the chronology of later stores. One source says that the second Buffalo store was opened at 549 William Street on June 20, 1891. Another says Knox opened his second store on December 18, 1893, at 519 Main Street, four days after the first store at 409 Main Street was destroyed in the Wonderland Building Fire. The 519 Main Street store replaced the 409 Main Street after the fire on December 14, 1893, and moved to 395 Main Street in 1895. He continued to build his S.H. Knox Co. 5 and 10 Cent Store empire. By the time of the 1911 incorporation of F. W. Woolworth Company, Knox was the second largest of six store operators with 98 U.S. and 13 Canadian locations. In 1912, he received $12 million of the $65 million merger proceeds and was appointed Director and Senior Vice-Principal of the Corporation. Knox is remembered as the pioneering city center store operator. His store in Detroit, Michigan, was the first outside of the agricultural and small-market towns. Many of the Woolworth's friendly rivals emulated his plan.

In 1913, he purchased Stephen Merrell Clement's interests in Marine National. At his death, Seymour was Vice President of the Woolworth Co. and Chairman of the Board of the Marine Trust Co. He was the first of three generations of the family to serve as Chairman.

== Personal life ==
In 1890, Seymour was married to Grace Millard (1862–1936), a daughter of Charles Abram Millard and Sarah Amelia (née Avery) Millard. Together, they had four children, one of whom died in infancy:

- Grace Knox (1893–1895), who died in infancy.
- Marjorie Knox (1900–1971), who married Joseph Hazard Campbell of Providence, Rhode Island in 1927. After Campbell was killed in a small plane accident in 1938, Marjorie remarried to Benjamin Klopp in 1948.
- Dorothy Virginia Knox (1896–1980), who married Frank Henry Goodyear Jr. in 1915. After Goodyear was killed in a car accident in 1930, Dorothy remarried to Edmund Pendleton Rogers, a widower from New York, in 1931.
- Seymour H. Knox II (1898–1990), who married Helen Northrup.

Knox died on May 17, 1915, in Buffalo, New York. After his death, his wife built a new mansion on Delaware Avenue for her and their children, designed by New York City architect C. P. H. Gilbert, known today as the Mrs. Seymour H. Knox House.

=== Descendants ===
Among his grandchildren were Seymour H. Knox III and Northrup R. Knox, the original principal owners of the NHL's Buffalo Sabres. Grace established The University at Buffalo's first endowment fund in 1916 when she donated $250,000. Knox bred champion trotters and pacers and was a polo enthusiast.

== See also ==
- F. W. Woolworth Company
- Knox Farm State Park
