= Northrup R. Knox =

American sports executive (1928–1998)

Owner of the Buffalo Sabres
- In office 1970–1998 Serving with Seymour H. Knox III, Robert O. Swados, & George W. Strawbridge Jr.
- Preceded by: Position established
- Succeeded by: John Rigas

7th Chairman of the United States Polo Association
- In office 1966–1970
- Preceded by: George C. Sherman Jr.
- Succeeded by: William T. Ylvisaker

Personal details
- Born: December 24, 1928 Buffalo, New York
- Died: July 23, 1998 (aged 69) East Aurora, New York
- Resting place: Forest Lawn Cemetery, Buffalo, New York
- Spouse: Lucetta Gilbert Crisp (m. 1950)
- Children: 2
- Parent(s): Seymour H. Knox II; Helen Northrup
- Relatives: Seymour H. Knox III (brother); Seymour H. Knox I (grandfather)
- Education: St. Paul's School
- Alma mater: Yale University
- Occupation: Sports executive, athlete

Northrup Rand Knox (December 24, 1928 – July 23, 1998), was a banker, sportsman, and community leader from Buffalo, New York, who, along with his brother Seymour, brought the National Hockey League to Buffalo as founders of the Buffalo Sabres. Knox was the third generation of the Knox family to serve as chairman of Marine Midland Bank and its predecessors. His father Seymour H. Knox II and grandfather Seymour H. Knox I also served as chairmen. He was also a past chairman of the Buffalo Sabres. He was chairman and governor of the United States Polo Association.

== Early life ==
He was born on December 24, 1928, in Buffalo, New York. He was the second son of Seymour H. Knox II and Helen Northrup. His elder brother, and only sibling, was Seymour H. Knox III.

Knox attended the Aiken Preparatory School in Aiken, South Carolina, and St. Paul's School in Concord, New Hampshire. He was a 1950 graduate of Yale University. At Yale, Norty starred in squash and won two Y's as a hockey goaltender. He was also a member of the Scroll and Key society.

== Career ==
The only amateur polo player in the postwar era to reach an eight-goal rating, he captained the US team in the challenge for the Cup of the Americas in 1966 and 1969 in Buenos Aires, Argentina, distinguishing himself as one of America's finest offensive players. With his legendary group of mares, known as the "4 Rs" (Ragamuffin, Rotallen, Ravanelle and Roulette), Norty was generally recognized as the best mounted player in the US at that time. After playing those ponies in the 1969 Cup of the Americas he was also considered the best mounted player in Argentina as well. He was inducted into the Polo Hall of Fame in 1994.

A protégé of the Basque master Pierre Etchebaster, Knox learned the sport at a young age at the Aiken Tennis Club and was a formidable opponent on the court tennis court. He became World Champion when he defeated Albert "Jack" Johnson at the Racquet and Tennis Club in New York in 1959. He held the title until 1969, when he retired, undefeated.

=== Buffalo Sabres ===
With his brother Seymour H. Knox III, he presented an application October 19, 1965, to obtain a National Hockey League expansion team in 1967, but was rebuffed. In 1968, the NHL Board of Governors rejected their agreement to move the Oakland Seals to Buffalo pending league approval. Finally, on December 2, 1969, the league announced its decision to expand to Buffalo and Vancouver for the 1970–71 season. Knox was a principal owner of the Buffalo Sabres from their foundation as a National Hockey League franchise in 1970 until a few months before his death.

=== Buffalo Sports ===
The Knox Brothers were the impetus behind the establishment of the Buffalo Bandits of the Major Indoor Lacrosse League in 1991 and the Buffalo Blizzard of the National Professional Soccer League in 1992.

The brothers also brought their vision of a state of the art sports and entertainment complex originally named the Marine Midland Arena and now called the KeyBank Center to life. The 20,000 seat complex was completed in 1996 and is located at 1 Seymour H. Knox III Plaza on the waterfront in downtown Buffalo. It is the home of the Buffalo Sabres and the Buffalo Bandits as well as the former home of the Buffalo Blizzard and Buffalo Destroyers of the Arena Football League.

== Personal life ==
In 1950, Knox was married to Lucetta Gilbert Crisp, whom he met while wintering in Aiken, South Carolina. She was the daughter of Van Devanter Crisp and Martha Crisp (née Ottley), of 33 East 77th Street in New York City, and the granddaughter of James H. Ottley of New York City and Glen Cove, Long Island, and was educated at the Garrison Forest School in Owings Mills, Maryland, and Sarah Lawrence College in Bronxville, New York. Together, they had two children:

- Linda Knox McLean (b. 1951), who was married Arthur Albert Schmon II of Vancouver, British Columbia, until their divorce.
- Northrup Rand Knox Jr. (b. 1954), who married Victoria A. Beers in 1992.

He died on July 23, 1998, in East Aurora, New York. Northrup's wife Lucetta died on October 12, 2008, after a long illness.

== Legacy ==
The Knox brothers, who brought major league hockey to Buffalo, were inducted into the Greater Buffalo Sports Hall of Fame in 1992 and into the Buffalo Sabres Hall of Fame in 1996. Northrup Knox was survived by his daughter, Linda Knox McLean, a son, Northrup R. Knox Jr., and five grandchildren, Richard, Lisa, and Arthur Schmon, Charles Rigby Knox and Northrup Knox III.

== See also ==
- Buffalo Sabres
- List of real tennis world champions
- Knox Farm State Park
- Aiken Tennis Club
- Real tennis
- Buffalo Memorial Auditorium

Awards and achievements
Preceded by Albert Johnson	Real Tennis World Champion; 1959–1969	Succeeded by G. W. Bostwick Jr.
Sporting positions
New creation	Buffalo Sabres owner 1970–1996; Served alongside: Seymour H. Knox III	Succeeded by John Rigas
