= Robert O. Swados =

American attorney and businessman

Robert Swados
- Born: February 27, 1919
- Died: November 23, 2012 (aged 93)
- Known for: Founder of the Buffalo Sabres

Robert Orville Swados (February 27, 1919 – November 23, 2012) was an attorney and businessman from Buffalo, New York, best known for his role as legal counsel for the US/Canadian National Hockey League and as one of the founders of the Buffalo Sabres.

== Personal life ==
Swados was married to poet and actress Sylvia Maisel, with whom he fathered two children, Lincoln and Elizabeth.

== Career ==
Along with Seymour H. Knox III and Northrup R. Knox, he was a partner in Niagara Frontier Hockey, the original consortium that founded the Buffalo Sabres. The consortium (later joined by George Strawbridge) sold the team in 1996. Swados was an alumnus of the State University of New York at Buffalo and Harvard Law School. He served in the United States Army during World War II, fighting on the front lines in the European theatre.

Swados was part of a group that attempted to form the Continental League, a baseball major league, in 1960, but failed before it started.

In addition to his duties as the Sabres' vice chairman, he served as secretary to the NHL's Board of Governors and as the general counsel to the league.

Outside hockey, he was a partner in the Cohen Swados law firm, which specialized in corporate, tax, and sports law before its disbanding in 2001.

Swados served as the Chairman of the Sabres Hall of Fame.

Swados' autobiography, Counsel in the Crease, was published in 2005.
