= Seymour H. Knox III =

American sports executive (1926–1996)

Owner of the Buffalo Sabres
- In office 1970–1996 Serving with Northrup R. Knox, Robert O. Swados, & George W. Strawbridge, Jr.

Personal details
- Born: March 9, 1926 Buffalo, New York
- Died: May 22, 1996 (aged 70) East Aurora, New York
- Spouse: Jean Read (after 1954)
- Children: 4
- Parent(s): Seymour Horace Knox II; Helen Northrup
- Relatives: Northrup R. Knox (brother); Seymour H. Knox I (grandfather)
- Education: St. Paul's School
- Alma mater: Yale University; Columbia University
- Occupation: Philanthropist and owner of the Buffalo Sabres

Seymour Horace Knox III (March 9, 1926 – May 22, 1996) was an American philanthropist and sports entrepreneur. He owned the Buffalo Sabres of the National Hockey League from their foundation in 1970 to his death in 1996, and served as chairman of the team. He was the grandson of Seymour H. Knox I, the F.W. Woolworth Company co-founder, and son of art enthusiast Seymour H. Knox II.

== Early life and education ==
Knox was born in 1926 in Buffalo, New York to Seymour H. Knox II (1898–1990) and Helen Northrup (1902–1971). His paternal grandparents were Grace Millard Knox (1862–1936) and Seymour H. Knox I (1861–1915), who merged his chain of five-and-dime stores with those of his first cousins, Frank Winfield Woolworth and Charles Woolworth, to form the F. W. Woolworth Company.

He studied at St. Paul's School in Concord, New Hampshire, and graduated from Yale and Columbia University before serving as a decorated Corporal in World War II in the United States Army Field Artillery.

== Career ==
Knox was a vice president at Dominick & Dominick Inc., one of the oldest, continuously operated financial services institutions in the United States, founded in 1870.

=== Hockey ===
Along with his brother Northrup R. Knox and attorney Robert O. Swados, he presented an application October 19, 1965 to obtain a National Hockey League expansion team in 1967. Knox's bid was not among the six chosen to take part in the 1967 NHL expansion. One year later, the NHL Board of Governors rejected a proposal from the Knox-Swados team to move the struggling Oakland Seals (one of the six expansion teams) to Buffalo. Finally, on December 2, 1969, the league announced its decision to add two additional teams for the 1970–71 season; the two teams were to be the Vancouver Canucks, who themselves had bid on entry in the previous expansion but were rejected, and the new Knox-Swados entry in Buffalo. It was Seymour's idea to name the team the Sabres. According to Seymour, a sabre is strong on both defense and offense, and is a weapon carried by a leader.

By 1975, the Sabres were in the Stanley Cup Finals and Knox was named The Hockey News executive of the year. Knox served on the NHL's Board of Governors for 25 years and was a director of the US Hockey Hall of Fame. Knox was a principal owner of the Buffalo Sabres from their founding as a National Hockey League franchise in 1970 until his death in Buffalo in 1996. He was inducted into the Hockey Hall of Fame in 1993, and was posthumously honoured with the Lester Patrick Trophy in 1997.

=== Other Buffalo sports ===
The Knox Brothers were the impetus behind the establishment of the Buffalo Bandits of the Major Indoor Lacrosse League in 1991 and the Buffalo Blizzard of the National Professional Soccer League in 1992.

The brothers also brought their vision of a state of the art sports and entertainment complex originally named the Marine Midland Arena and now called the KeyBank Center to life. The 18,690 seat complex was completed in 1996 and is located at 1 Seymour H. Knox III Plaza on the waterfront in downtown Buffalo. It is the home of the Buffalo Sabres and the Buffalo Bandits as well as the former home of the Buffalo Blizzard and Buffalo Destroyers of the Arena Football League.

== Personal life ==
On May 16, 1954, he was married to Jean Read, daughter of William Augustus Read, in Greenwich, Connecticut. Jean was a graduate of the Chapin School in New York and was introduced into society in 1952 at the Debutante Cotillion in Boston. Together, they had four children:

- Seymour Knox IV, former president of Friends of Knox Farm State Park, who married Constance Jewell in 1989.
- W. A. Read Knox, who is married to Shannon Sullivan
- Avery Fabyan Knox (b. 1957), who studied art history at Yale University and married Nancy Ableson in 1988
- Helen Knox, who married Robert G. Keilholtz, Jr. in 1993

As a philanthropist, Knox contributed to a vast array of Greater Buffalo charities and causes such as the Chamber of Commerce, United Way and Children's Foundation of Erie County. He was fond of playing tennis, squash, and polo.

Knox died on May 22, 1996. His eulogy remarks on the Congressional Record were made by Daniel P. Moynihan in the U.S. Senate and John J. LaFalce and Jack Quinn in the House of Representatives.

=== Legacy ===
The Knox brothers were inducted into the Greater Buffalo Sports Hall of Fame in 1992 and into the Buffalo Sabres Hall of Fame in 1996.

== See also ==
- Buffalo Sabres
- Knox Farm State Park
- Buffalo Memorial Auditorium

Sporting positions
New creation	Buffalo Sabres owner 1970–1996; Served alongside: Northrup R. Knox	Succeeded by John Rigas
