= Buffalo Sabres =

National Hockey League team in Buffalo, New York

- 2026–27 Buffalo Sabres season
- Conference: Eastern
- Division: Atlantic
- Founded: 1970
- History: Buffalo Sabres; 1970–present
- Home arena: KeyBank Center
- City: Buffalo, New York
- Team colors: Royal blue, gold, white
- Media: MSG Western New York; WGR 550; Sabres Hockey Network
- Owner: Terry Pegula
- General manager: Jarmo Kekäläinen
- Head coach: Lindy Ruff
- Captain: Rasmus Dahlin
- Minor league affiliates: Rochester Americans (AHL)
- Stanley Cups: 0
- Conference championships: 3 (1974–75, 1979–80, 1998–99)
- Presidents' Trophies: 1 (2006–07)
- Division championships: 7 (1974–75, 1979–80, 1980–81, 1996–97, 2006–07, 2009–10, 2025–26)
- Official website: nhl.com/sabres

The Buffalo Sabres are a professional ice hockey team based in Buffalo, New York. The Sabres compete in the National Hockey League (NHL) as a member of the Atlantic Division in the Eastern Conference. The team was established in 1970, along with the Vancouver Canucks, when the league expanded to 14 teams. The Sabres have played their home games at KeyBank Center since 1996, having previously played at the Buffalo Memorial Auditorium since their inception. The Sabres are owned by Terry Pegula, who purchased the club in 2011 from Tom Golisano.

The team has twice advanced to the Stanley Cup Final, losing to the Philadelphia Flyers in 1975 and to the Dallas Stars in 1999. The Sabres, along with the Canucks, are the oldest active NHL franchises to have never won the Stanley Cup. The Sabres held the NHL record longest playoff drought in the NHL at 14 seasons, which occurred between the 2010–11 and 2025–26 seasons.

== History ==
=== Early years and the French Connection (1970–1981) ===
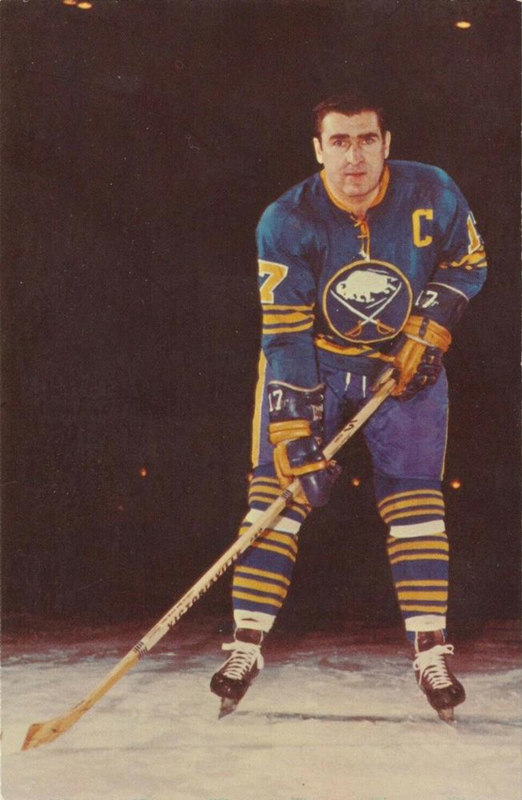
Floyd Smith served as the first team captain in 1970. Four years later, he became head coach, with his first season seeing the team reach the Stanley Cup Final for the first time in franchise history.

The Sabres, along with the Vancouver Canucks, joined the NHL in the 1970–71 season. Their first owners were Seymour H. Knox III and Northrup Knox, scions of a family long prominent in Western New York and grandsons of the co-founders of the Woolworth's variety store chain; along with Robert O. Swados, a Buffalo attorney. On the team's inaugural board of directors were Robert E. Rich Jr., later the owner of the Buffalo Bisons minor league baseball team; and George W. Strawbridge Jr., an heir to the Campbell's fortune. Buffalo had a history of professional hockey; immediately prior to the Sabres' establishment, the Buffalo Bisons were a pillar of the American Hockey League (AHL), having existed since 1940 (and before that, another Bisons hockey team played from 1928 to 1936), winning the Calder Cup in their final season.

Wanting a name other than "bison" (a generic stock name used by Buffalo sports teams for decades), the Knoxes commissioned a name-the-team contest. With names like "Mugwumps", "Buzzing Bees" and "Flying Zeppelins" being entered, the winning choice, "Sabres", was chosen because Seymour Knox felt a saber was a weapon carried by a leader, and could be effective on both offense and defense. (Note: The name was selected because, as public relations director Chuck Barr wrote in a press release, 'a sabre is renowned as a clean, sharp, decisive and penetrating weapon on offense, as well as a strong parrying weapon on defense.') (Note: The spelling sabre is otherwise rarely used in the United States (where it is saber) but, as with many words which can end either in -re or -er, it is spelled sabre in neighboring Canada.) The Knoxes tried twice before to get an NHL team, first when the NHL expanded in 1967, and again when they attempted to purchase the Oakland Seals with the intent of moving them to Buffalo. Their first attempt was thwarted when Pittsburgh Steelers owner Art Rooney persuaded his horse racing friends James and Bruce Norris to select Pittsburgh over Buffalo. The second attempt was due to the NHL not wanting an expansion market to give up on a team so soon, nor isolate the Los Angeles Kings (the only NHL team other than the Seals west of St. Louis at the time) from the rest of the NHL entirely. At the time of their creation, the Sabres created their own AHL farm team, the Cincinnati Swords. Former Toronto Maple Leafs general manager and head coach Punch Imlach was hired in the same capacity with the Sabres.

The Sabres' debut in 1970 also coincided with the AFL–NFL merger in which the Buffalo Bills joined the National Football League, and the National Basketball Association's Buffalo Braves also began to play. The city of Buffalo went from having no teams in the established major professional sports leagues to three in one off-season. Between the Braves and the Sabres, the Sabres would prove to be by far the more successful of the two; Paul Snyder, the nouveau riche Braves owner, publicly feuded with the old money Knoxes and the local college basketball scene, eventually losing those feuds and being forced to sell his team in 1976. Subsequent owners of the Braves, in a series of convoluted transactions tied to the ABA–NBA merger, moved the team out of Buffalo.

When the Sabres debuted as an expansion team, they used Aram Khachaturian's Armenian war dance "Sabre Dance" as their entrance song. The music has been associated with the team ever since, typically at the beginning of each period.

The consensus was that the first pick in the 1970 NHL amateur draft would be junior phenomenon Gilbert Perreault. Either the Sabres or the Canucks would get the first pick, to be determined with the spin of a wheel of fortune. Perreault was available to the Sabres and Canucks as this was the first year the Montreal Canadiens did not have a priority right to draft Quebec-born junior players. The Canucks were allocated numbers 1–10 on the wheel, while the Sabres had 11–20. When league president Clarence Campbell spun the wheel, he initially thought the pointer landed on one. While Campbell was congratulating the Vancouver delegation, Imlach asked Campbell to check again. As it turned out, the pointer was on 11, effectively handing Perreault to the Sabres. Perreault scored 38 goals in his rookie season of 1970–71, at the time a record for most goals scored by an NHL rookie, and he received the Calder Memorial Trophy as the NHL's rookie of the year.

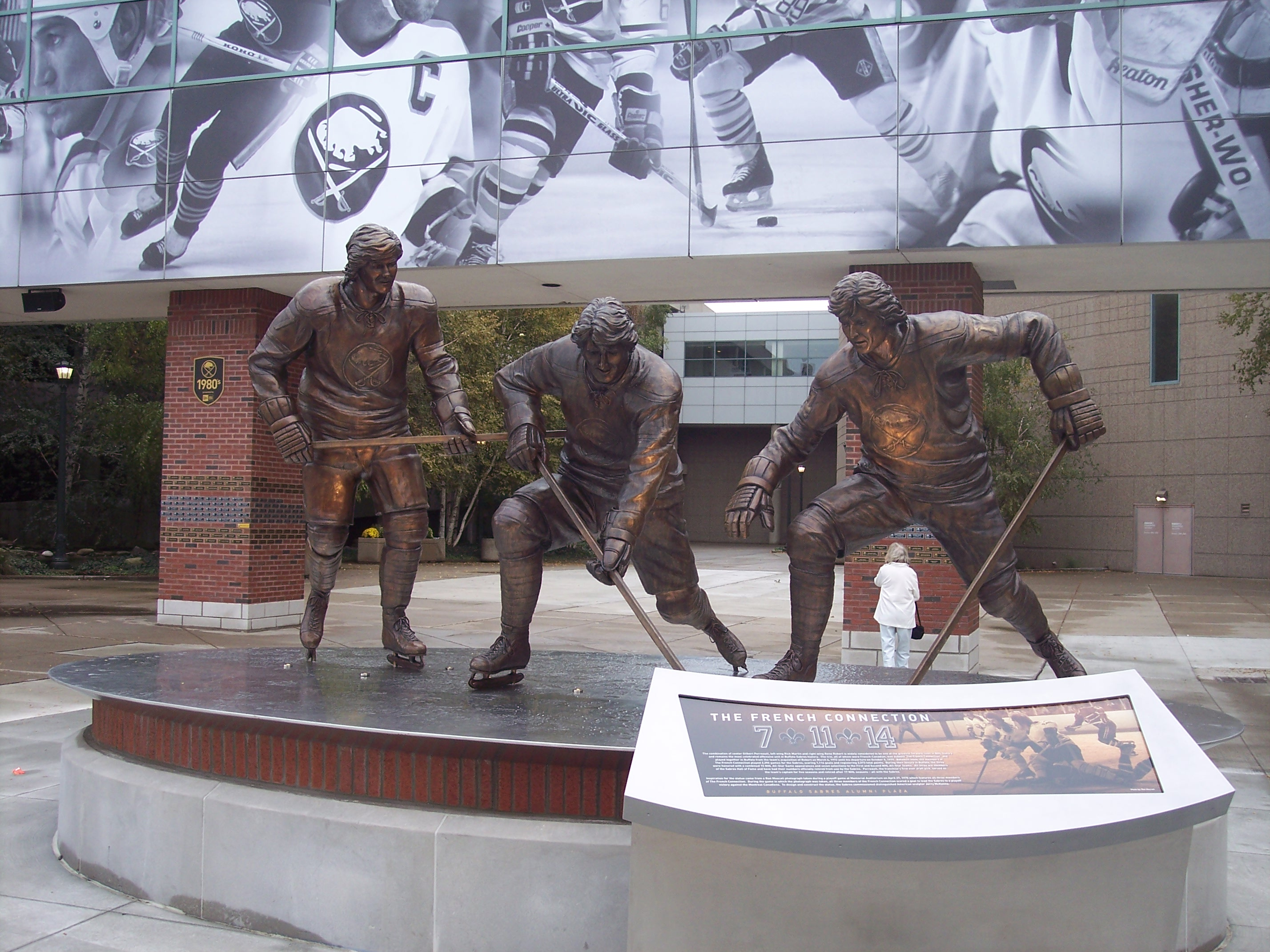
A statue of the French Connection line stands outside KeyBank Center. Consisting of Gilbert Perreault, Rick Martin, and Rene Robert, they played together from 1972 to 1979.

During the team's second season, rookie Rick Martin, drafted fifth overall by Buffalo in 1971, and recently acquired Rene Robert joined Perreault to become one of the league's top forward lines in the 1970s. Martin broke Perreault's goal-scoring record as a rookie with 44 goals. They were nicknamed "The French Connection" after the movie of the same name and in homage to their French-Canadian roots. The Sabres made the playoffs for the first time in 1972–73, just the team's third year in the league, but lost in the quarterfinals in six games to the eventual Stanley Cup champion Montreal Canadiens.

After the 1973–74 season, which saw them miss the playoffs (as well as defenseman Tim Horton's death in a DUI-induced car accident), the Sabres did an odd moment at the 1974 NHL amateur draft. General manager Punch Imlach, annoyed at the length of the draft, decided to draft a fictitious Japanese player named Taro Tsujimoto; the pick was subsequently invalidated. That season, they tied for the best record in the NHL in the regular season. Buffalo advanced to the Stanley Cup Final for the first time in team history to play against the Philadelphia Flyers, a series which included the legendary Fog Game (game three of the series). Due to unusual heat in Buffalo in May 1975 and the lack of air conditioning in the Buffalo Memorial Auditorium, parts of the game were played in heavy fog that made players, officials, and the puck invisible to many spectators. During a face-off and through the fog, Sabres center Jim Lorentz spotted a bat flying across the rink, swung at it with his stick, killing it. It was the only time that any player killed an animal during an NHL game. The Sabres won that game thanks to Rene Robert's goal in overtime. However, Philadelphia would wind up taking the Stanley Cup in six games, winning the series 4–2.

Although Danny Gare scored 50 goals in the 1975–76 season, the team lost in the quarterfinals to the New York Islanders. The team did not return to the Final with the French Connection despite a Wales Conference championship in 1979–80 and being the first team to beat a team from the Soviet Union during the Super Series '76. The French Connection era ended with Robert's trade to the Colorado Rockies in 1979 and Martin's trade to the Los Angeles Kings in 1981. All three players have had their jersey numbers (11, 7 and 14, respectively) retired and a statue erected in their honor at KeyBank Center in 2012.

=== Adams/Northeast Division rivalries (1981–1996) ===
In 1981–82, the NHL realigned its conferences and adopted an intra-divisional playoff format for the first two rounds. It was the beginning of an era in which the Sabres would finish in the middle of the Adams Division standings with regularity, and then face the near-certainty of having to get past either the Boston Bruins or Canadiens to make it to the conference finals. Aside from first-round victories over Montreal in 1983 and Boston in 1993, the era saw the Sabres lose to division rivals Boston, the Quebec Nordiques and Montreal in the Adams Division semifinals (first round) a combined eight times, and miss the playoffs altogether in 1985–86 and 1986–87—only third and fourth times out of the playoffs in franchise history. Perrault reached the 500-goal mark in the 1985–86 season and retired after playing 20 games in 1986–87, 17 years after joining the Sabres as their first draft pick.

The Sabres drafted Pierre Turgeon with the first pick in the 1987 NHL entry draft, and he quickly made an impact with the team. During his rookie season in 1987–88, he helped the Sabres reach the playoffs for the first time in three years. He was joined in 1989 by Alexander Mogilny, who with the help of Sabres officials became the first Soviet player to defect to the NHL. In the 1989–90 season, the Sabres would improve to finish with 98 points—third-best in the NHL, but the playoff futility continued with a first-round loss to Montreal. The Sabres traded Turgeon to the New York Islanders in 1991 as part of a blockbuster seven-player trade that brought Pat LaFontaine to Buffalo.

In 1992–93, goaltender Dominik Hašek joined the team in a trade from the Chicago Blackhawks. In the 1993 playoffs, the Sabres upset the Bruins in a four-game sweep in the Adams Division semifinals, their first playoff series victory in ten years. Brad May's series-winning goal in overtime of game four in Buffalo was made famous by Rick Jeanneret's "May Day!" call. However, the eventual Stanley Cup champion Montreal Canadiens swept the Sabres in the division final, with the Sabres losing all four games by a 4–3 score.

With the NHL adopting a conference playoff format for the 1993–94 season, the Sabres faced the New Jersey Devils in the Eastern Conference playoffs' first round. Despite Hašek winning a 1–0 quadruple overtime goaltending duel with the Devils' Martin Brodeur in game six, Buffalo would lose the series in seven games. Another first-round playoff loss to the Philadelphia Flyers in the lockout-shortened 1994–95 season was followed by a fifth-place finish in the Northeast Division in 1995–96, as the team missed the playoffs for the first time in nine years. It was the first season under head coach Ted Nolan and the last for the Sabres at Buffalo Memorial Auditorium. During his coaching tenure, Buffalo was referred to as the "hardest-working team in hockey". This season also featured the debut of veteran Randy Burridge, who earned a spot on the roster after he attended training camp on a try-out basis. He scored 25 goals that season and was second in team scoring to Pat LaFontaine. Burridge also earned the Tim Horton Award for being the unsung hero and was voted team most valuable player.

The final game in Memorial Auditorium was played on April 14, 1996, a 4–1 victory over the Hartford Whalers. Sabres principal owner Seymour Knox died a month later, on May 22, 1996.

=== Final trip and ownership turnover (1996–2005) ===
Ted Nolan and the Sabres rebounded in 1996–97, their first at Marine Midland Arena, by winning their first division title in 16 years, with Nolan winning the Jack Adams Award as the NHL's top coach, Dominik Hašek winning both the Hart and Vezina Trophies (the first goaltender to do so since Montreal's Jacques Plante in 1962), Michael Peca taking home the Frank J. Selke Trophy as the best defensive forward in the NHL and general manager John Muckler honored as Executive of the Year. The team also acquired Miroslav Šatan in a trade with the Edmonton Oilers.

However, the regular season success was overshadowed by what had taken place during the playoffs. Tensions between Nolan and Hašek had been high for most of the season. After being scored upon in game three of the first round against the Ottawa Senators, Hašek left the game, forcing backup Steve Shields to step in. Hašek claimed he felt his knee pop, and the team doctor pronounced him day-to-day. The Buffalo News columnist Jim Kelley wrote a column that night for the next day's newspaper questioning the severity of the injury, which irked Hašek. After the Senators won game five, Hašek came out of the Sabres' training room and attacked Kelley, tearing his shirt. Despite the fact Hašek issued an apology, things went downhill after the incident. Shields started as the Sabres goaltender for the remainder of the series as the team rallied to defeat Ottawa. However, before the next series against the Philadelphia Flyers, the NHL announced Hašek had been suspended for three games, with the Sabres informing the NHL Hašek was healthy. Set to return in game four with the Sabres down by three games to none, Hašek told the Sabres' coaching staff he felt a twinge in his knee and left the ice after the pre-game skate. Although the Sabres staved off elimination in game four, they lost in game five.

Team president Larry Quinn fired general manager John Muckler, who had a noted feud with Nolan. Hašek, who supported Muckler, openly told reporters at the NHL Awards Ceremony he did not respect Nolan. The new general manager, Darcy Regier, offered Nolan just a one-year contract, but Nolan refused. Regier then pulled the contract off the table and did not offer another one, ending Nolan's tenure as Sabres coach. Former Sabres captain Lindy Ruff was hired as head coach on July 21, 1997, agreeing to a three-year contract.

==== New owners and return to the Final ====
During the 1997–98 season, the Sabres, which had lost $32 million over the previous three seasons and nearly missed payroll in December 1997, were sold by Northrop Knox to John Rigas, owner of Adelphia Communications. Shortly thereafter, Quinn was dismissed and replaced by John's son, Timothy Rigas. The Sabres reached the conference finals that season, but lost to the Washington Capitals in six games.

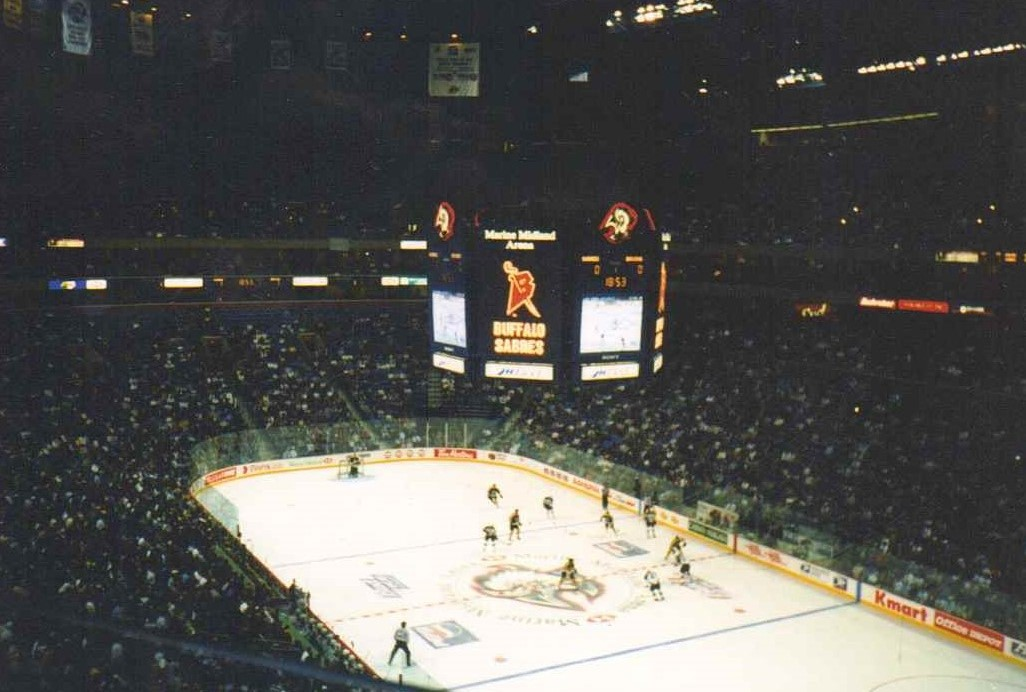
The Sabres playing a game during the 1998–99 season. The Sabres were later crowned the Eastern Conference champions following the 1999 Stanley Cup playoffs.

In the 1998–99 season, Šatan scored 40 goals, doing so during the dead puck era where goal-scoring had dropped to 5.19 goals per game. The Sabres also added centers Stu Barnes from the Pittsburgh Penguins and Joe Juneau from the Capitals. The team returned to the Stanley Cup Final, this time against the Presidents' Trophy-winning Dallas Stars. In game six, Brett Hull's triple-overtime goal ended the series, and the Stars were awarded the Cup. In 1999, it was illegal to score a goal if an offensive player's skate entered the crease before the puck did. However, NHL officials maintained that Hull's two shots in the crease constituted a single possession of the puck since the puck deflected off Hašek. The rule was changed for the following season, allowing players to be inside the goaltender's crease as long as they do not interfere with the goaltender.

In the 1999–2000, Doug Gilmour was acquired from the Chicago Blackhawks at the trade deadline. Hašek was also sidelined for three months due to a torn groin, but returned with two months left in the regular season. Gilmour on the other hand was stricken by stomach flu just before the postseason. The Sabres finished as the eighth seed in the Eastern Conference, clinching a playoff spot on the final day of the regular season with a 1–1 tie against the Capitals. Like the previous playoffs season, there would be an officiating controversy. In game two, Flyers left wing John LeClair put the puck in the net through a hole in the mesh. While replays appeared to show the puck entering through the "side" of the net, the goal was allowed to stand. The Flyers would win the game 2–1 and go on to win the series four games to one.

Captain Michael Peca sat out the 2000–01 season due to a contract dispute, and was later traded to the New York Islanders in June 2001 for Tim Connolly and Taylor Pyatt. Even so, the Sabres still defeated Philadelphia in six games during the first round of the playoffs, winning 8–0 in the final game. In the second round, they faced the Pittsburgh Penguins but lost via a seventh-game overtime goal scored by defenseman Darius Kasparaitis. After lengthy and failed negotiations with their star goaltender, the Sabres traded Hašek to the Detroit Red Wings in the summer of 2001, closing out his career with Buffalo.

==== Ownership turmoil and lockout ====
In May 2002, John Rigas and his sons were indicted for bank, wire and securities fraud for embezzling more than $2 billion from Adelphia. Rigas was later convicted and served eight years of a 15-year sentence before his release in 2016. The NHL took control of the team, though the Rigas family remained owners on paper. After the two-year period of uncertainty, including rumors of relocating to another city or even outright folding, the team was sold to a consortium led by Rochester billionaire, and former New York gubernatorial candidate, Tom Golisano and former Sabres president Larry Quinn. Golisano was introduced as team owner on March 19, 2003.

With the 2002–03 season starting under NHL control, general manager Darcy Regier could make only minimal moves. However, with the consultations of impending new ownership, the team began their rebuilding process around the March 2003 trade deadline by clearing out veteran players. The first to go was winger Rob Ray, who was sent to the Ottawa Senators. The team then sent center and team captain Stu Barnes to the Dallas Stars in exchange for winger Michael Ryan and a draft pick. A third deal sent center Chris Gratton to the Phoenix Coyotes with a draft pick for Daniel Briere and a draft pick. Over the summer, Regier also completed a three-team trade that landed them Chris Drury. Although the team improved during the 2003–04 season, they did not make the playoffs. The next season was then curbed by the 2004–05 NHL lockout. Many of the players would play overseas or for the Rochester Americans during the lockout.

=== Post-lockout success (2005–2010) ===
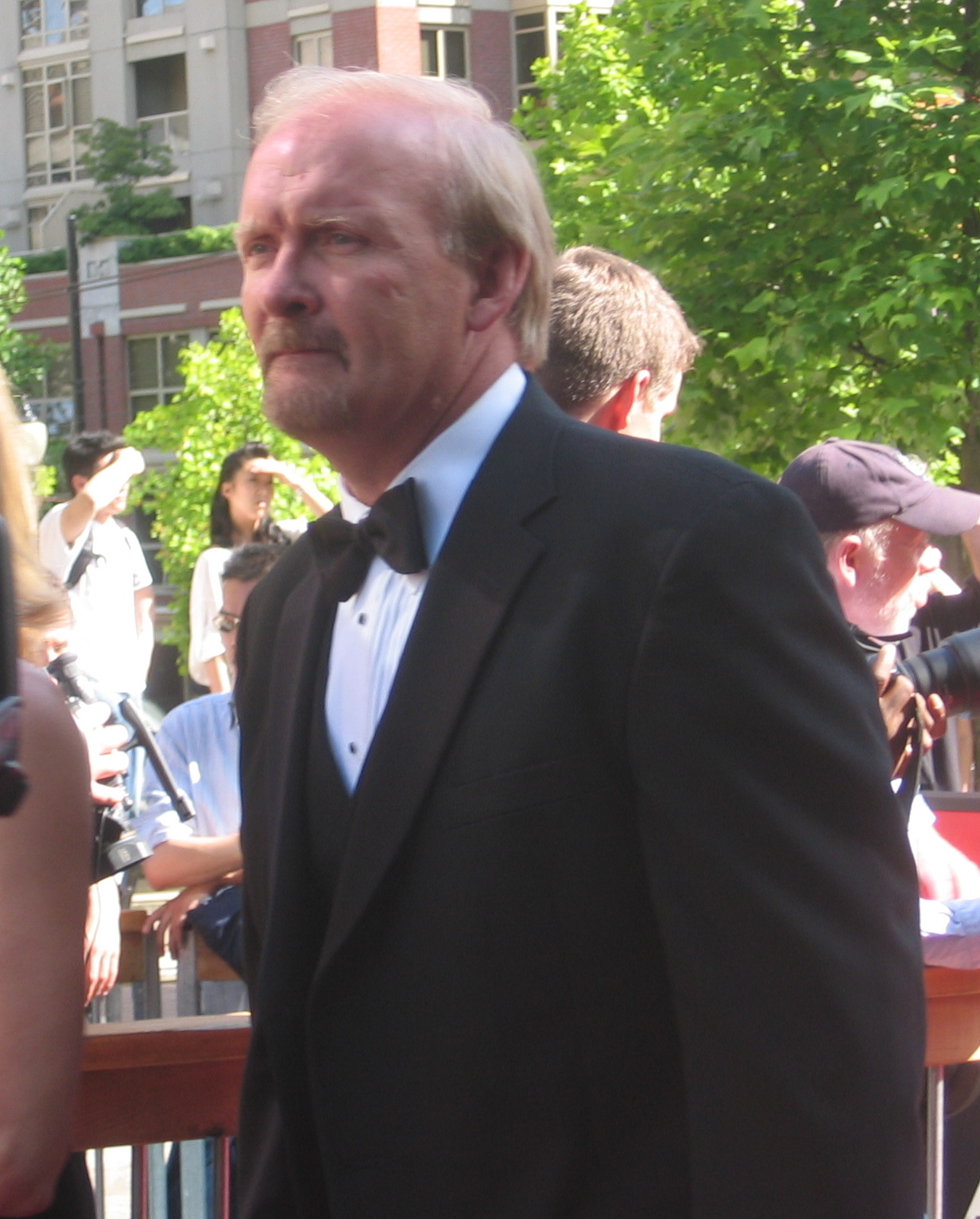
Lindy Ruff was awarded the Jack Adams Award in 2006. He was the second Sabres coach to win the award.

In 2005, the Sabres lost their main cable television broadcaster, as the Empire Sports Network, which had been on the air since 1991, ceased operations during the Adelphia scandal and reorganization. Like the Sabres, Empire had been owned by Adelphia prior to the NHL's seizure of the franchise. Adelphia sold their rights to Sabres telecasts and for the 2005–06 campaign Madison Square Garden Network (MSG), a New York City-based channel which broadcasts New York Rangers, New York Islanders and New Jersey Devils games, took over the rights to broadcast Sabres games to television viewers in western New York, with the Sabres controlling all aspects of the broadcast. The agreement was later extended through 2017, then again through 2027.

In the 2005–06 season, the Sabres finished with their best record in over 20 years and clinching their first playoff berth since the 2000–01 season. The team finished the regular season with 52 wins, surpassing the 50-win mark for the first time in franchise history. They also finished with 110 points, their first 100-point season in 23 years and tied the 1979–80 club for the second-best point total in franchise history. The Sabres tied the Ottawa Senators and Carolina Hurricanes for the most wins in the Eastern Conference. They finished with the fifth-best record in the NHL, behind Detroit, Ottawa, Dallas and Carolina.

Buffalo defeated the Philadelphia Flyers in the first round of the 2006 playoffs in six games, then the top-seeded Ottawa in five games in the second round. The Sabres advanced to play Carolina in their first conference finals since 1999. However, injuries began to mount. They were forced to play without four of their top defensemen, Teppo Numminen, Dmitri Kalinin, Jay McKee, and Henrik Tallinder, and their top powerplay scorer, Tim Connolly, for much of the series. Despite this, the Sabres forced the series to seven games before falling to the eventual Stanley Cup champions Carolina. The Sabres' impressive season was recognized on June 22, 2006, at the NHL Awards Ceremony when Lindy Ruff edged Hurricanes coach Peter Laviolette to win the Jack Adams Award as coach of the year in the closest vote in the award's history. Ruff was the second Sabres coach to win the award.

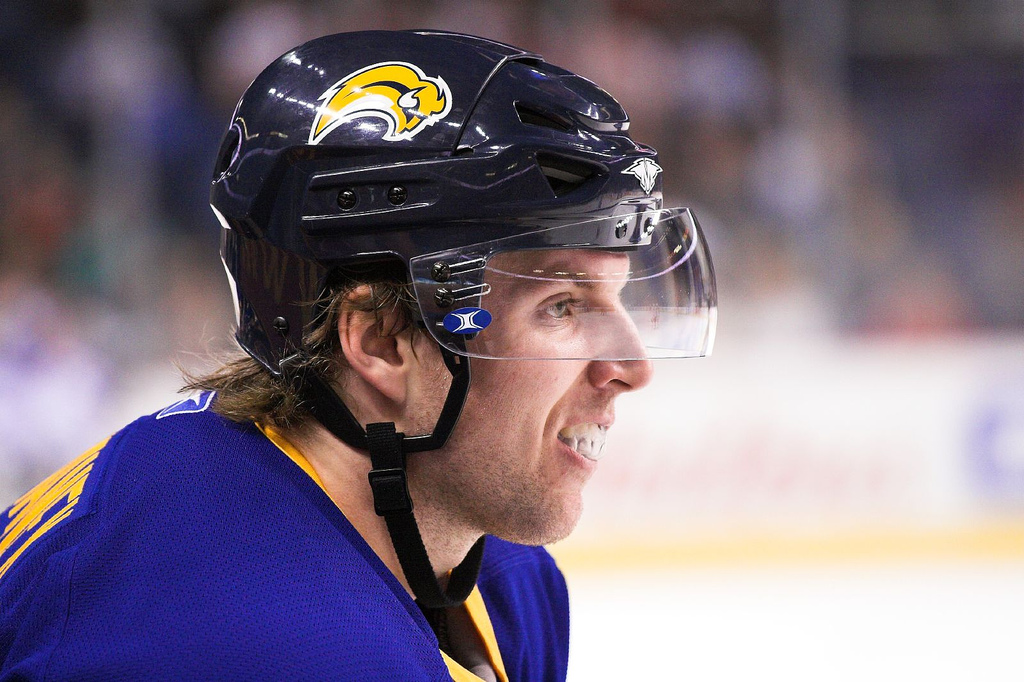
Thomas Vanek was re-signed in 2007 after the Edmonton Oilers offered him a seven-year offer sheet.

The Sabres started the 2006–07 season 10–0, setting a new franchise record for consecutive wins to start a season, and becoming just the second team in NHL history, after the 1993–94 Toronto Maple Leafs, to open a season with a ten-game winning streak. They also set a new NHL record for consecutive road wins to start a season (eight), which was extended to ten games (tying the team record for consecutive road wins) after a 7–4 win over the Carolina Hurricanes on November 13, 2006. This record would be beaten by the 2023–24 Los Angeles Kings. The team reached the 50-win plateau for the second time in franchise history. The Sabres won the Presidents' Trophy for the first time in franchise history, giving them the home-ice advantage for their entire run in the 2007 playoffs. They also tied the 1974–75 team's franchise record for points in a season. The team defeated the New York Islanders and the New York Rangers to reach their second consecutive conference finals. However, on May 19, they were eliminated by the Ottawa Senators after five games.

In the April 9, 2007, issue of ESPN the Magazine, the team ranked first of 122 major professional sports franchises in North America. The Sabres were cited for their player accessibility, low ticket prices and exciting brand of hockey.

==== Post-Briere–Drury era ====
On July 1, 2007, the Sabres lost both co-captains, with Daniel Briere going to the Philadelphia Flyers and Chris Drury going to the New York Rangers as free agents. The team also nearly lost Thomas Vanek to the Edmonton Oilers, which offered him a seven-year, $50 million offer sheet, but the Sabres matched the offer on July 6. After these events, the team changed its policy of not negotiating contracts during the regular season. Long-time Sabres broadcast color commentator Jim Lorentz announced his retirement during the preseason. Hockey Night in Canada's Harry Neale took over the position in October 2007.

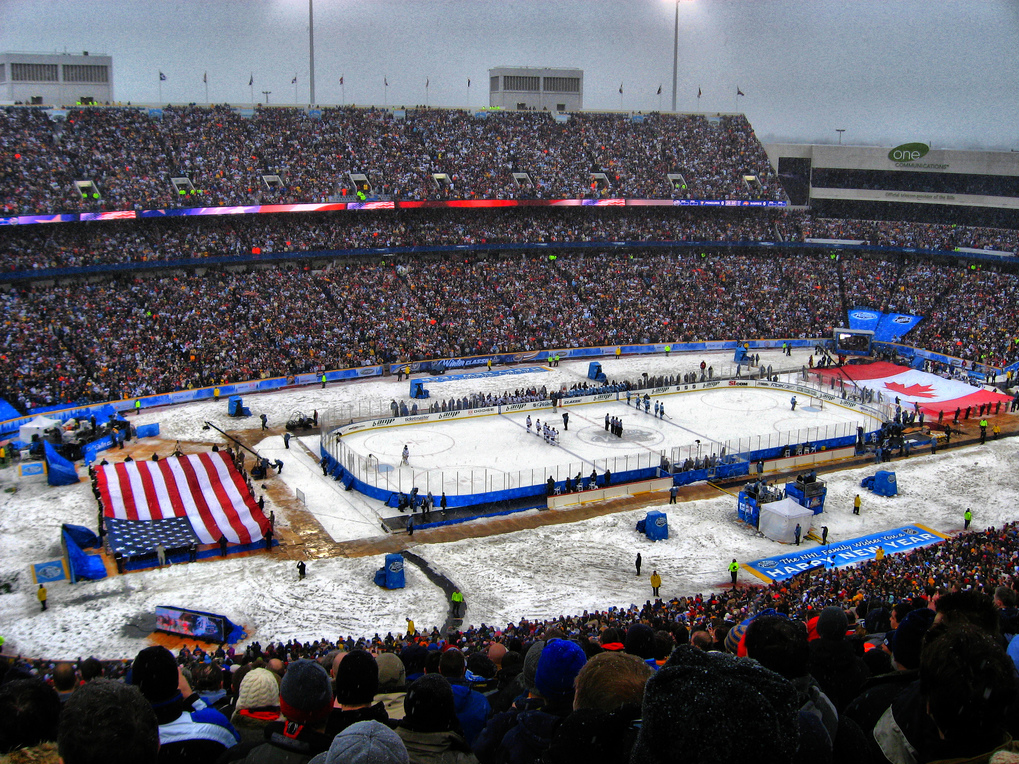
In 2008, the Sabres hosted the Pittsburgh Penguins at Ralph Wilson Stadium in the inaugural Winter Classic.

During the 2007–08 season, the Sabres hosted a game against the Pittsburgh Penguins on January 1, 2008, which was played outdoors at Ralph Wilson Stadium, home of the Buffalo Bills of the National Football League (NFL). The 2008 Winter Classic, known colloquially as the "Ice Bowl" due to it taking place at the same time as college football's bowl games. The Sabres lost 2–1 in a shootout. The Sabres failed to qualify for the 2008 playoffs and became only the third team in NHL history to go from finishing first overall in the regular season standings to finishing out of the playoffs the following year.

On June 10, the Sabres officially announced their new AHL affiliate, beginning in the 2008–09 season, would be the Portland Pirates from Portland, Maine. This ended their 29-year affiliation with the Rochester Americans. They signed with the Pirates for two seasons, with a parent club option for a third. In the offseason, the Sabres acquired Craig Rivet from the San Jose Sharks in exchange for a second-round draft pick in each of the next two drafts. The Sabres also extended the contracts of some players including Ryan Miller (five years) and Jason Pominville (five years). Miller was slated to become an unrestricted free agent the upcoming season while Pominville was set to become a restricted free agent. On October 8, the Sabres named defenseman Craig Rivet team captain, the first single full-time captain since Stu Barnes' term from 2001 to 2003. The team was also active at the trade deadline. First, they signed Tim Connolly to a two-year, $4.2 million extension, then acquired Mikael Tellqvist from the Phoenix Coyotes for a fourth-round pick in the 2010 draft. Dominic Moore came from the Toronto Maple Leafs during the 2009 draft. On April 9, the Buffalo Sabres were eliminated from the playoffs.

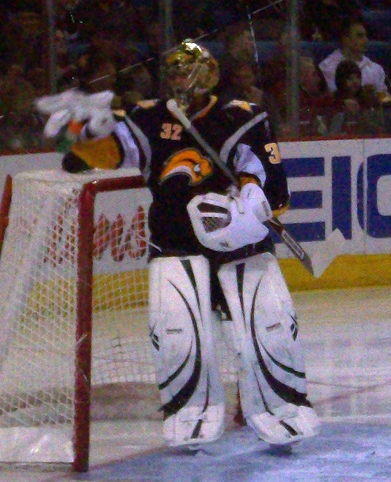
Mikael Tellqvist was acquired by the Sabres on March 4, 2009. He was their backup goaltender for the remainder of the 2008–09 season.

General manager Darcy Regier announced on the first day of free agency for the following season the Sabres had signed unrestricted free agent defenseman Steve Montador to a two-year contract. After only playing two games with Buffalo that season, Daniel Paille was traded to the Boston Bruins on October 20, 2009, in exchange for a third-round and a conditional fourth-round draft selection. Paille's move to Boston marked the first ever trade of a player under contract between the two division rivals in their common 39 years in the NHL. Tyler Ennis, who was selected 26th in the 2008 draft, made his NHL debut this season. On January 1, the Sabres became the first team to win consecutive games when trailing by three or more goals since the Dallas Stars did it in 2005–06; Buffalo defeated the Atlanta Thrashers 4–3 in overtime. It was Buffalo's second straight win in a game it trailed 3–0, following a 4–3 victory over the Pittsburgh Penguins. On March 27, the Sabres clinched their first playoff berth since 2006–07 with a 7–1 rout of the Tampa Bay Lightning. On April 6, the Sabres clinched the Northeast Division title by defeating the New York Rangers by a score of 5–2. However, they were defeated in six games by the Boston Bruins in the first round of the playoffs.

The 2010–11 roster did not have many significant changes in the offseason. One of the most notable was the team's decision to waive center Tim Kennedy, a Buffalo native, to avoid paying the award he won in arbitration. Defensemen Henrik Tallinder and Toni Lydman were allowed to leave as free agents, while the team signed veterans Jordan Leopold and Shaone Morrisonn to replace them. Additionally, center Rob Niedermayer was added.

=== The Pegula era (2010–present) ===
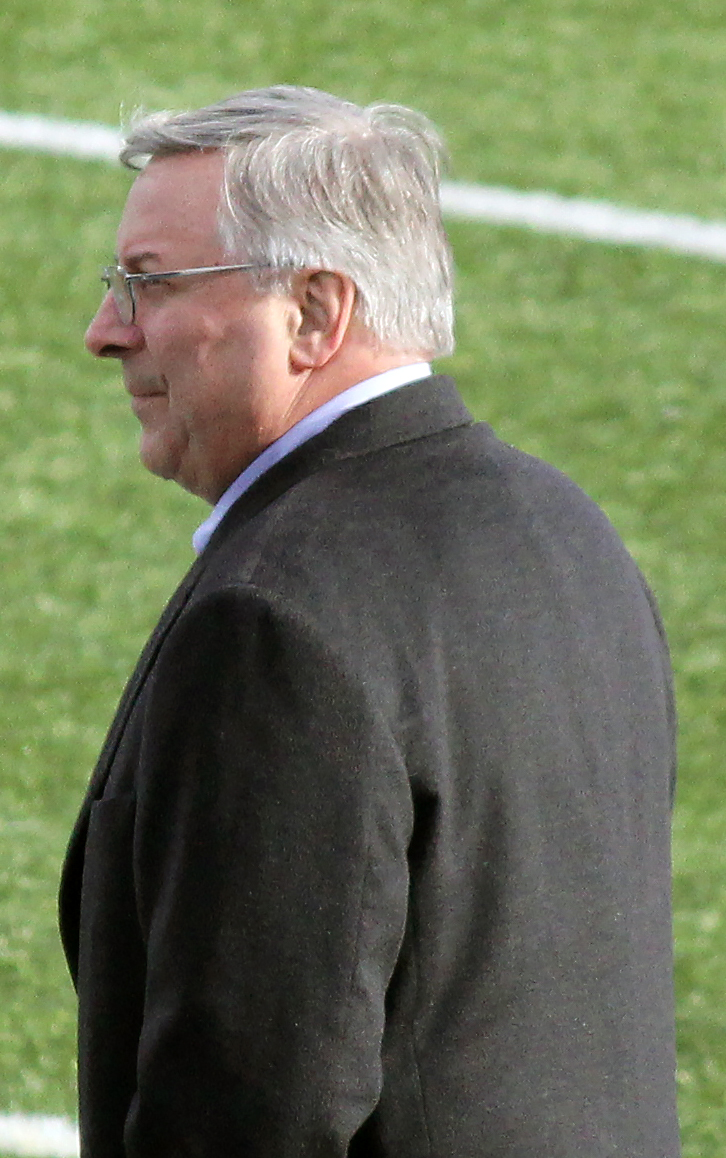
On February 18, 2011, the sale of the Sabres franchise to Terrence Pegula was finalized.

On November 30, 2010, Ken Campbell of The Hockey News reported a story that billionaire Terry Pegula had signed a letter of intent to purchase the Sabres for US$150 million. Pegula was the founder, president and CEO of East Resources, one of the largest privately held companies in the United States before he sold the company. After the report was released, Sabres managing partner Larry Quinn claimed it was "untrue" but refused further comment. The $150 million was later determined to be an undervalued amount, as Forbes magazine had valued the team at just under $170 million in 2010. In December, Pegula officially expressed interest in buying the Sabres for $170 million and submitted a letter of intent to the NHL. In January, Golisano reportedly issued a counteroffer with an asking price of US$175 million. Pegula and Golisano reached an agreement to sell the team on January 29, 2011, with Pegula purchasing the team for $189 million ($175 million with $14 million in debt included) with the Sabres and Golisano officially making an announcement in a press conference on February 3, 2011. NHL owners approved the sale on February 18.

In the conference, it was stated that an unnamed bidder submitted a much higher bid than Pegula's, but made the bid contingent upon moving the team. The description is consistent with that of Jim Balsillie, who has made public his efforts to move a team to Hamilton, Ontario, a move the Sabres have actively opposed. Terry Pegula named former Pittsburgh Penguins executive Ted Black to be team president. Pegula was introduced as the Sabres' owner in a public ceremony at HSBC Arena on February 23, accompanied by what would be the final appearance of all three members of The French Connection before Rick Martin's death three weeks later. Around the 2010–11 trade deadline, the team attempted to trade Craig Rivet, but was unsuccessful. After initially clearing waivers, Rivet entered re-entry waivers and was claimed by the Columbus Blue Jackets. Late on February 27, the team acquired Brad Boyes from the St. Louis Blues in exchange for a second-round draft pick. This was the Sabres' sole trade of the deadline. After Pegula's official takeover of the team, the Sabres finished the regular season 16–4–4, never losing two consecutive games in that span, and landed the seventh seed in the Eastern Conference. Pegula's approach was credited by players, fans and the public with bringing new energy to the team, sparking a run to the playoffs that seemed improbable only months earlier. On April 8, the Sabres clinched a playoff berth for the second consecutive season, defeating the Philadelphia Flyers 4–3 in overtime. The Sabres clinched the seventh seed and faced Philadelphia in the first round. The Sabres had a three games to two lead but lost the series in seven games.

==== Playoff drought ====
The Sabres began the 2011–12 season as part of the 2011 NHL Premiere series for the first time, playing games in Finland and Germany. The team was particularly well-received during a game against Adler Mannheim in Mannheim, the hometown of Sabres forward Jochen Hecht. Prior to the first game, Lindy Ruff named Jason Pominville the Sabres' 13th full-time captain in team history. The Sabres began the season relatively strong but collapsed after a Boston Bruins game in which Bruins forward Milan Lucic hit and injured goaltender Ryan Miller; the subsequent months saw the Sabres collapse to last place in the Eastern Conference. Despite a two-month rally that began in February along with the emergence of rookie forward Marcus Foligno, the Sabres lost the last two games of the regular season and fell three points short of a playoff spot.

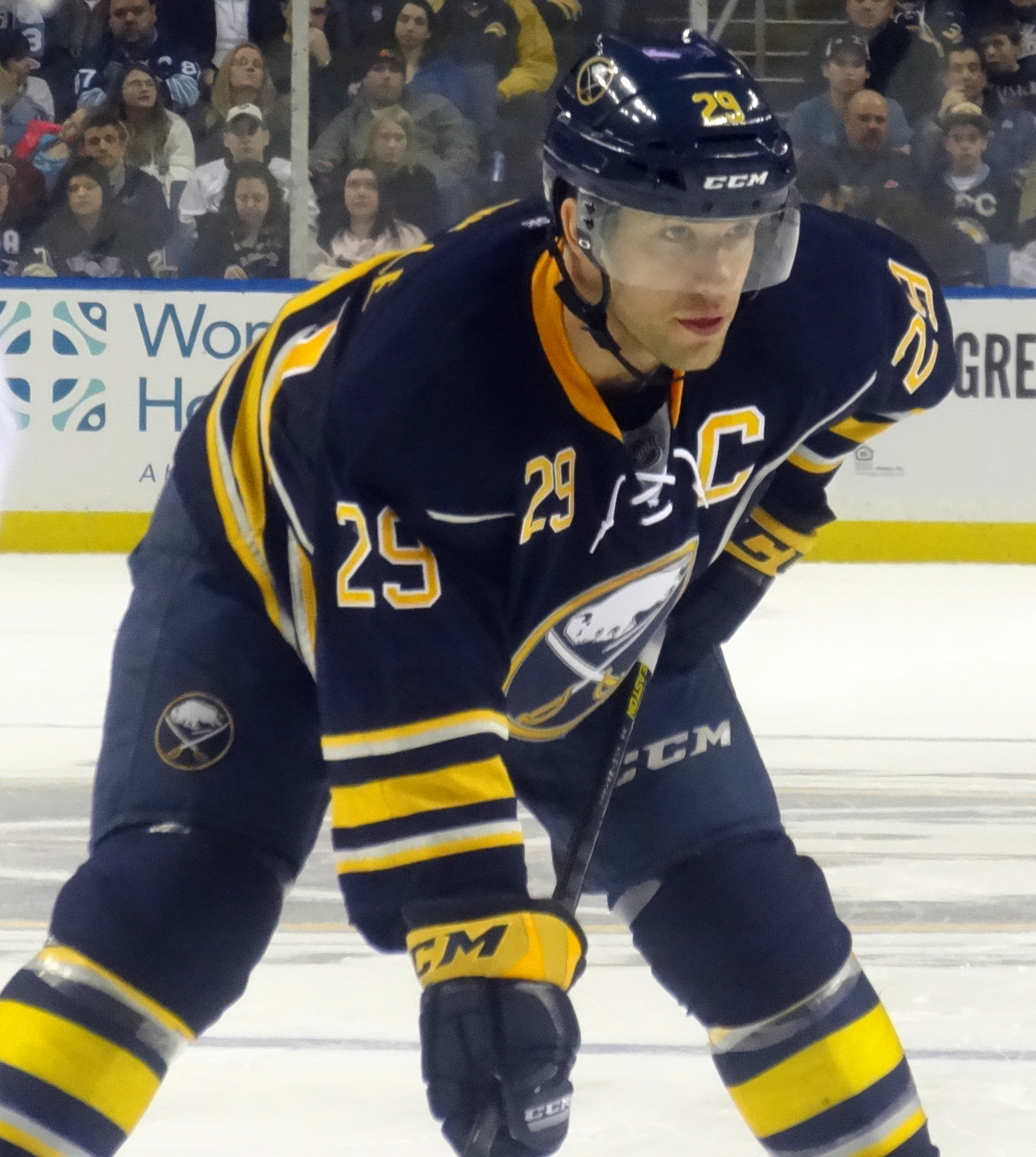
Jason Pominville was named the 13th Sabres team captain before the start of the 2011–12 season.

The 2012–13 NHL lockout eliminated the first part of the 2012–13 season, which ultimately began with a scheduled 48 games. After a 6–10–1 start to the season, Lindy Ruff's contract was terminated by general manager Darcy Regier on February 20, 2013, ending 16 seasons as head coach. Ruff was replaced by Ron Rolston first on an interim basis, then full-time after the season ended. In the days leading up to the trade deadline, the Sabres were active in trades. On March 15, the Sabres' first trade sent T. J. Brennan to the Florida Panthers in exchange for a fifth-round pick (originally owned by the Los Angeles Kings) in the 2013 draft. On March 30, the Sabres traded Jordan Leopold to the St. Louis Blues in exchange for a second-round pick and a conditional fifth-round pick in the 2013 draft. On April 1, the Sabres traded Robyn Regehr to the Los Angeles Kings in exchange for two-second round draft choices (one in 2014 and the other in 2015). The final trade came on the day of the trade deadline, April 3, where the Sabres sent Jason Pominville to the Minnesota Wild for Johan Larsson and Matt Hackett. It was later revealed that draft picks were also involved in the deal: the Wild would receive a fourth-round pick in the 2014 draft, and the Sabres would receive a first-round pick in the 2013 draft and a second-round pick in the 2014 draft.

The following season, on November 13, 2013, the team dismissed general manager Darcy Regier and head coach Ron Rolston. Former Sabres head coach Ted Nolan was named interim head coach for the remainder of the season. He later signed a three-year contract extension. Pat LaFontaine was named president of hockey operations. On January 9, 2014, Tim Murray, the assistant general manager of the Ottawa Senators, was named general manager. On February 28, 2014, Murray made his first major trade, sending star goaltender Ryan Miller and captain Steve Ott to the St. Louis Blues in exchange for goaltender Jaroslav Halak, forwards Chris Stewart and William Carrier and two draft picks. After just over three months as president of hockey operations, Pat LaFontaine resigned from the Sabres to return to his previous position with the NHL on March 1, 2014. Among highlights in the otherwise bad 2013–14 season included the "butt goal" in which a severely short-staffed Sabres won their December 23 contest against the Phoenix Coyotes when Coyotes goaltender Mike Smith backed into his own goal with the puck lodged in his pants, and the lone NHL appearance of former Lancaster High School goaltender Ryan Vinz, who was working as a videographer in the Sabres organization, to suit up as a backup goaltender in the wake of the Ryan Miller trade. The Sabres finished the 2013–14 season last in the NHL and again missed the playoffs.

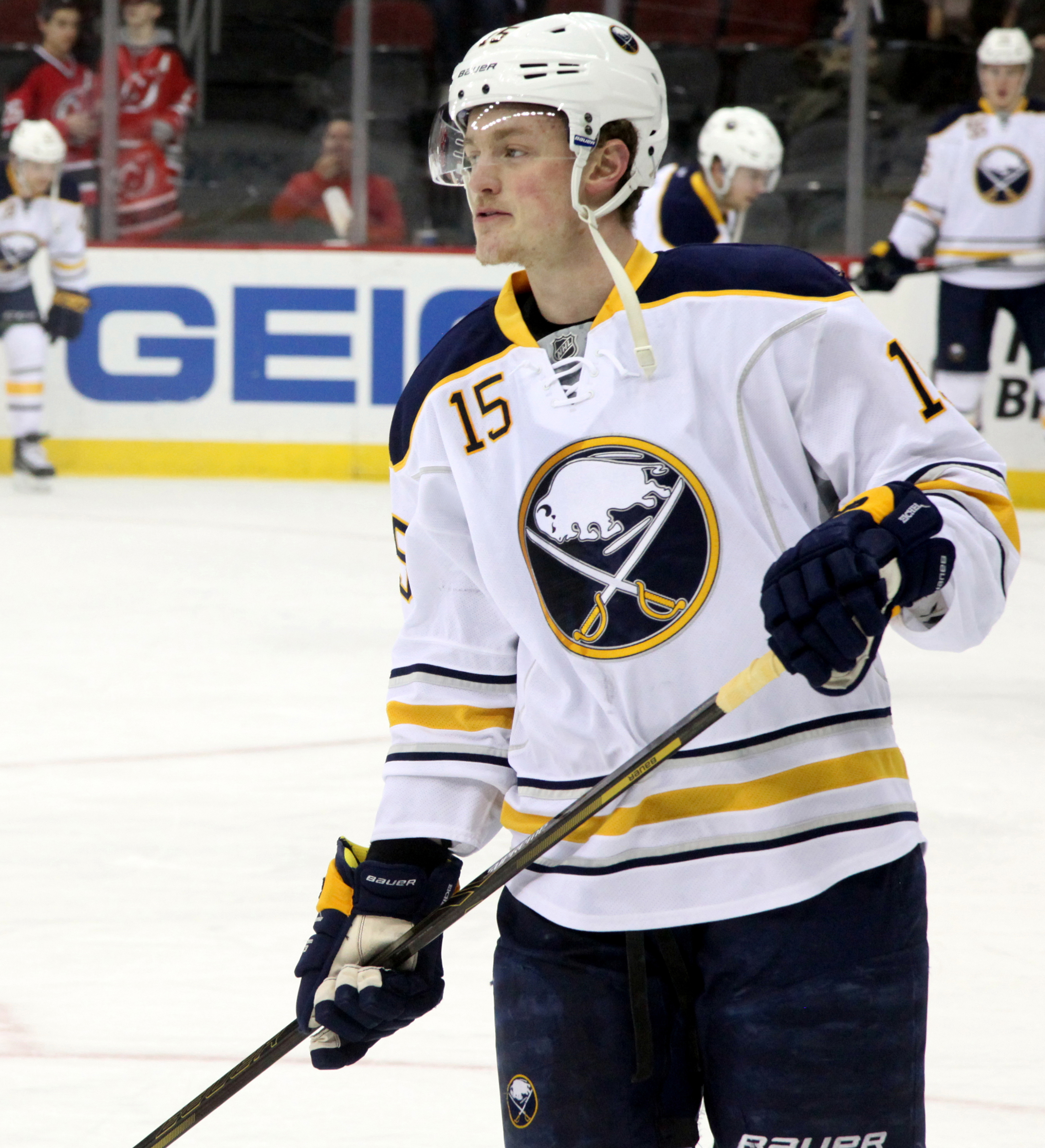
The Sabres selected Jack Eichel with the second overall pick in the 2015 NHL entry draft.

Despite winning two more games than the previous season, the 2014–15 season was much like the previous one, with the team sitting near the bottom of the standings the entire season, and finishing last in the NHL. On March 26, 2015, during a 4–3 overtime loss to the Arizona Coyotes, spectators at the game, ostensibly fans of the Sabres, cheered after a game-winning goal by Coyotes center Sam Gagner. The Sabres clinched last place with a loss to the Columbus Blue Jackets on April 10 and got the second pick in the draft which they used to select Jack Eichel. Murray fired Nolan at the end of the season, citing a lack of chemistry between them. On May 28, 2015, Dan Bylsma was hired as the 17th head coach in franchise history.

The hiring of Bylsma, the drafting of Eichel and 2014 second overall pick Sam Reinhart, the acquisition of star centerman Ryan O'Reilly in the offseason, and the rising performance of youngsters Zemgus Girgensons, Jake McCabe and Rasmus Ristolainen resulted in an improved season in 2015–16. Even though the Sabres again missed the playoffs for the fifth consecutive season, the team managed to finish just under .500 in points percentage with a 27-point improvement over the previous season.

In mid-2016, the team announced that its television broadcasts would be spun off to their own regional sports network, MSG Western New York. The new network continues to operate under the MSG banner but under Pegula Sports and Entertainment control and features additional programs centered around the Sabres and the Buffalo Bills, which the Pegulas purchased separately in 2014. The team failed to make significant progress, and in fact slightly regressed, in 2016–17, missing the playoffs for the sixth consecutive season, leading to the firings of both head coach Dan Bylsma and general manager Tim Murray on April 20, 2017.

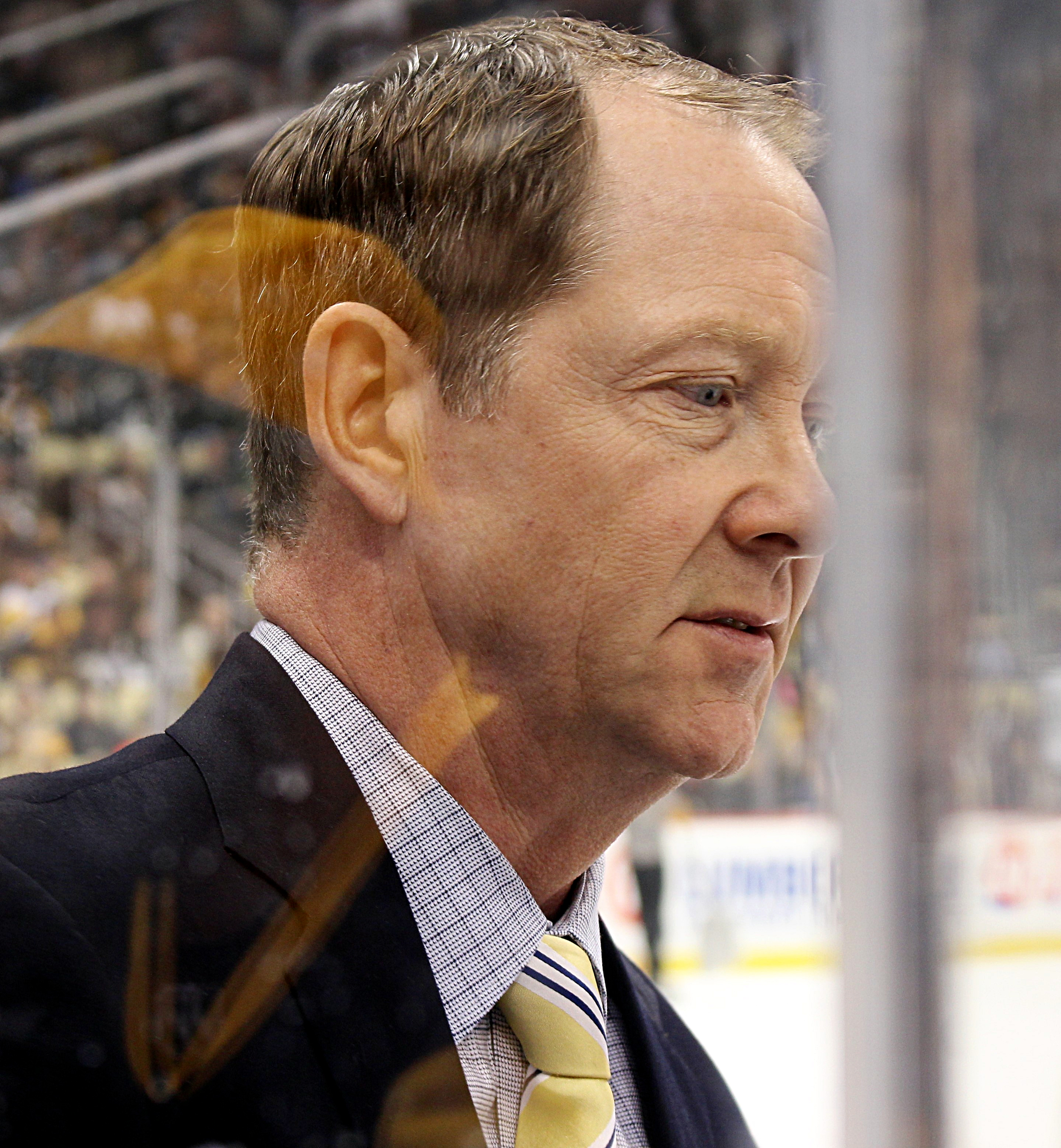
Phil Housley during the 2017–18 season. Housley was named the Sabres' head coach the preceding offseason. He would be fired following the 2018–19 season.

During the 2017 offseason, the Sabres hired two of their former players as head coach and general manager: Jason Botterill as general manager and Phil Housley as head coach. Among the more notable roster changes for this season was the return of former scoring leader Jason Pominville to the team in a trade that brought him and defenseman Marco Scandella to Buffalo in exchange for sending forwards Tyler Ennis and Marcus Foligno to the Minnesota Wild.

In the 2017–18 season, the Sabres participated in the 2018 Winter Classic, losing 3–2 in overtime to the New York Rangers. Buffalo finished in last place in the NHL for the third time in five seasons and won the draft lottery for the 2018 NHL entry draft for the first time since 1987, using the pick to select Rasmus Dahlin from Frölunda HC of the Swedish Hockey League.

On November 27, 2018, the Sabres became the first team in NHL history to lead the league in points after the first 25 games of the season after finishing last in the league the previous season. The team won 10 games in a row for the first time since the 2006–07 season and tied the franchise record. Jeff Skinner became the seventh player in franchise history to score 20 or more goals in less than 27 games, and only the second player to score 20 goals before December. The team then collapsed and missed the playoffs, leading to Housley's firing at the end of the season.

On March 21, 2019, it was announced that the Sabres would play the Tampa Bay Lightning in the 2019 NHL Global Series at Ericsson Globe in Stockholm, Sweden. Ralph Krueger was named the Sabres head coach in May 2019.

In the 2019–20 season, the Lightning defeated the Sabres 5–3 in the Global Series on November 9, 2019. The team traded a draft pick for Jimmy Vesey and during the season traded Scandella for a draft pick. Even with 24 teams making the expanded playoffs due to the COVID-19 pandemic, the Sabres finished with a 30–31–8 record and missed the postseason for the ninth consecutive season.

On June 16, 2020, despite Kim Pegula's vote of confidence three weeks prior, Botterill was fired and replaced by Kevyn Adams.

On March 17, 2021, in the midst on a twelve-game losing streak, head coach Ralph Krueger was fired. Don Granato was named interim head coach. After continuing to lose games, on March 29, 2021, the Sabres tied the Pittsburgh Penguins' all-time NHL losing streak of 18 games from the 2003–04 season after blowing a 3–0 lead in the third period against the Philadelphia Flyers and subsequently losing in overtime; it is the longest losing streak since the shootout was introduced. Granato was named the full-time head coach at the end of the season.

With their last-place finish in the 2020–21 season, they won the draft lottery and selected Owen Power with the first overall pick in the 2021 draft. Longtime play-by-play announcer Rick Jeanneret also announced the upcoming season would be his final one. Prior to the 2021–22 season, the Sabres traded away Sam Reinhart and Rasmus Ristolainen. During the season, the team traded away Jack Eichel for Peyton Krebs, Alex Tuch and two draft picks. Leading to the trade, Eichel had suffered a herniated disc and sought an independent specialist who recommended an artificial total disc. Eichel's lawyers also told the Sabres organization that the surgery would be required or he wouldn't be able to play the following season. However, the Sabres organization placed him on injured reserve and stripped him of the captaincy prior to the season. The Vegas Golden Knights funded his surgery following the trade, winning the Stanley Cup with Eichel in 2023. The team ended up missing for the 11th consecutive season, setting the record for consecutive missed playoff seasons.

The Sabres improved in the 2022–23 season, going 42–33–7 and finishing above .500 for the first time since 2011 and only finishing one point below the playoff line. With the Sacramento Kings clinching a spot in the 2023 NBA playoffs, it left both the New York Jets and Sabres as the teams among the major professional leagues with the longest active postseason drought with twelve seasons.

On August 17, 2023, Rick Jeanneret died. The Sabres honored his legacy by renaming Perry Street, the street adjacent to KeyBank Center, to "RJ Way" on October 13. The team regressed slightly in the 2023–24 season. They ended up trading captain Kyle Okposo to the Florida Panthers—he would end up winning the Stanley Cup with Florida. On April 9, they were eliminated from postseason potential with a loss to the Dallas Stars. On April 16, 2024, one day after playing the final game of the season, head coach Granato was fired, marking his ousting as the seventh coach the Sabres have employed since the playoff drought began. One week later, on April 22, former coach Lindy Ruff was named as the new head coach, returning for a second tenure.

In the 2024–25 season, after beginning the season 11–9–1, the Sabres went on a 13-game losing streak. During the streak, owner Terry Pegula visited the team while they were in Montreal to express his support in the team and leadership. On April 8, 2025, the team was eliminated from postseason potential for the 14th time. Shortly after the end of that season, the government of Erie County announced plans to end its 30-year operational lease of KeyBank Center when it expires in September 2026, ostensibly placing the arena into the responsibility of the city of Buffalo, who indicated an inability to pay for the maintenance of said arena. In a statement to the press, Sabres chief operating officer Pete Guelli insisted that the team did not intend to relocate. On July 30, the Sabres and KeyBank announced a new arena naming rights contract that will keep the team in the arena through the 2035–36 season.

==== Return to the playoffs ====
General manager Kevyn Adams was fired December 15, 2025, succeeded by Jarmo Kekäläinen. This coincided with a sudden turnaround in the team's fortunes, as the team won 20 out of 24 games from December 2025 through the end of January 2026. On April 4, 2026, the Sabres clinched a playoffs spot, ending their 14-year drought. They clinched the Atlantic Division on April 13, winning their first division title since 2010. The season ended with a game seven overtime loss to the Montreal Canadiens in the second round of the playoffs.

== Team information ==
=== Logo and uniforms ===
The Sabres have had, for the most part, used a primary logo featuring a bison atop two crossed sabers in a blue circle with gold trim. This logo was first used from 1970 to 1996 and was restored in 2020 after the Sabres 50th anniversary season was complete.

Throughout their 26-year tenure at the Buffalo Auditorium, the Sabres have worn white uniforms with a blue and gold shoulder yoke and alternating gold, white and blue stripes. On the road they wore blue uniforms with gold stripes. In 1978 the primary logo was added on the shoulders.

Upon moving to what is now KeyBank Center (formerly Marine Midland and HSBC Arena, later First Niagara Center) in 1996, the Sabres changed their logo and colors. Red, black and silver replaced blue and gold while the primary "bison head" logo was unveiled as the primary logo. Black road (later home) and white home (later road) uniforms were also released featuring a bull's head silhouette design in front and the "Sabre B" alternate logo on the shoulders.

The first third jersey of the Buffalo Sabres was created in 2000. The primary color was Sabre red, with black and silver stripes on the sleeves. It also featured the word "Buffalo" written on a black stripe outlined by silver near the waist. The logo was a black circle with two sabers crossing each other (a nod to the original logo).

On October 7, 2001, the Sabres wore a modified version of their white jerseys in a road game against the New York Rangers. The uniform replaced the "bison head" with the "NEW YORK" diagonal wordmark as a tribute to the state of New York in the wake of the September 11 attacks.

On September 16, 2006, the Sabres unveiled new home and away jerseys featuring midnight blue, maize (gold), silver and white colors. Front chest numbers were also added. The new logo, a stylized bison, was widely reviled, drawing unfavorable comparisons to a banana slug (hence the nickname "Buffaslug"). Despite the criticism, five of the top ten player jerseys sold in the first two months of the 2006–07 season were Sabres "slug" designs. Nevertheless, the Sabres brought back the classic blue jerseys as a third jersey, but continued to pair the look with the navy helmet and pants. When the Reebok Edge template was unveiled in 2007, the Sabres kept their "Buffaslug" uniforms, but the following season, they released a new third jersey featuring the classic look depicted in the navy, gold, silver and white colors. The Sabres also wore the original white uniforms during the 2008 Winter Classic.

The third jersey eventually became the primary home jersey on September 18, 2010, when the Sabres released a modern version of the classic 1970–1996 logo. A corresponding road white jersey was also released, along with a third jersey featuring an alternate throwback arrangement that pays homage to the AHL's Buffalo Bisons, complete with the team's 40th Anniversary insignia (essentially the original royal blue version of the current logo with the year "1970" inside).

In 2013, the Sabres released a new third jersey, featuring a gold front and navy back design. The uniform only lasted two seasons, after which it was retired.

The Sabres kept their uniforms largely intact when Adidas took over as its supplier, save for the removal of silver sections in the armpits. They were also the only remaining NHL team to sport uniform numbers in front; teams such as the Dallas Stars and San Jose Sharks briefly added numbers in front of their uniforms before removing them altogether.

During the 2018 Winter Classic, the Sabres broke out white uniforms with the classic blue and gold shade, albeit with a different striping scheme from the original uniforms.

The 2019–20 season marked the final season of the navy and gold look, as the Sabres announced the return to royal blue uniforms for the following season. Also, a 50th-anniversary white third jersey was used, featuring metallic gold elements on the logo and stripes.

On August 11, 2020, the Sabres unveiled the uniforms for the upcoming season. The style is similar to the ones worn in the early days of the franchise. Jersey numbers are no longer displayed on the front. The Sabres also released a "Reverse Retro" alternate uniform, bringing back the "crossed swords" alternate from 2000 to 2006 but recolored to the current royal, gold and white scheme.

For the 2022 Heritage Classic, the Sabres again wore a variation of their classic uniforms, but without the blue shoulder yoke and with a cream base.

On August 31, 2022, the Sabres announced that their black uniform used from 1995 to 2006 would become their new third jersey. This same uniform also became the basis of their second "Reverse Retro" uniform, but recolored to the white, blue and gold scheme and featured white pants.

On November 2, 2026, the Sabres unveiled a "Hometown Remix" uniform, featuring a design similar to the 2022–23 "Reverse Retro" uniform but in blue with gold and silver trim.

=== Broadcasters ===
Current

- Dan Dunleavy, play-by-play and intermission interviewer
- Rob Ray, color commentator
- Brian Duff, studio host
- Howard Simon, fill-in studio host
- Martin Biron, studio analyst
- Danny Gare, fill-in studio analyst

Past

- Brian Blessing, studio host (1995–2003)
- Ted Darling, TV play-by-play (1970–1991) and studio host (1992–1993)
- Dave Hodge, radio play-by-play (1970–1971)
- Rick Jeanneret, TV and radio play-by-play (1971–2022)
- Jim Lorentz, color commentator (1981–2007)
- Harry Neale, color commentator (2007–2012) and studio analyst (2012–2013)
- Mike Robitaille, color commentator (1985–1992), TV studio analyst (1989–2014)
- Kevin Sylvester, fill-in play by play, studio host (2005–2016)
- Pete Weber, radio play-by-play (1994–1996)

=== National anthems ===
The Canadian and U.S. national anthems are sung before every Sabres home game, regardless if the visiting team is Canadian or American, because Buffalo is adjacent to the Canadian border and many spectators come from Canada. Saint Catharines, in particular, is noted for its residents' Sabres fandom, and the city is included in the team's regional territory. Doug Allen sang the Canadian and US national anthems at most home games (except in cases where there is a conflict with his charitable work for the Wesleyan Church) until resigning in 2021 because of his refusal to take a COVID-19 vaccine. Curtis Cook is the arena's in-game organist. During Tom Golisano's ownership, the team occasionally used the services of singer Ronan Tynan who sang "God Bless America" while Allen performed the Canadian anthem (in such cases, the U.S. anthem was not performed). As of 2024, the anthems have been performed by Cami Clune, former semi-finalist on The Voice.

=== In-game hosting ===
Rich Gaenzler, morning host at WGRF, took over as in-game host beginning in 2018 before he was fired in 2021 over an unrelated dispute pertaining to his WGRF show, which was canceled at the same time. WBFO personality Jay Moran is the current public address announcer; he succeeded Milt Ellis in the position.

In November 2021, the Sabres added an official team dog, named Rick, a Newfoundland puppy trained as a service animal. Rick was graduated to daily service and succeeded by Nikki, a Golden Retriever puppy.

=== Minor league affiliates ===
The Sabres are presently affiliated with two minor league teams, the Rochester Americans of the American Hockey League, and the Jacksonville Icemen of the ECHL. The Americans play at the Blue Cross Arena in Rochester, New York. Founded in 1956, the Americans were previously the Sabres AHL affiliate from the 1979–80 season to the 2007–08 season. During the original Sabres affiliation, the Americans won three Calder Cup championships and finished as runners-up another six times. They finished out of the playoffs only five times in 28 years. The Sabres became re-affiliated with the Americans starting with the 2011–12 season when after buying the Sabres, Pegula purchased the Americans from former owner Curt Styres.

The Jacksonville Icemen are based in Jacksonville, Florida and have been the Sabres ECHL affiliate since the 2023–24 season. Unlike the Americans, the Icemen are not owned by Pegula but are instead owned by SZH Hockey LLC.

== Season-by-season record ==
This is a partial list of the last five seasons completed by the Sabres. For the full season-by-season history, see List of Buffalo Sabres seasons

Note: GP = Games played, W = Wins, L = Losses, OTL = Overtime Losses/SOL = Shootout Losses, Pts = Points, GF = Goals for, GA = Goals against

Season	GP	W	L	OTL	Pts	GF	GA	Finish	Playoffs
2021–22	82	32	39	11	75	232	290	5th, Atlantic	Did not qualify
2022–23	82	42	33	7	91	296	300	5th, Atlantic	Did not qualify
2023–24	82	39	37	6	84	246	244	6th, Atlantic	Did not qualify
2024–25	82	36	39	7	79	269	289	7th, Atlantic	Did not qualify
2025–26	82	50	23	9	109	288	241	1st, Atlantic	Lost in second round, 3–4 (Canadiens)

== Players and personnel ==
=== Current roster ===
Updated November 19, 2026

No.	Nat	Player	Pos	S/G	Age	Acquired	Birthplace
6	(Canada)	Zach Benson	LW	L	21	2023	Langley, British Columbia
10	(Canada)	Sam Carrick	C	R	34	2026	Markham, Ontario
46	(Canada)	Louis Crevier	D	R	25	2026	Quebec City, Quebec
26	(Sweden)	Rasmus Dahlin (C)	D	L	26	2018	Trollhättan, Sweden
15	(Canada)	Justin Danforth	RW	R	33	2025	Oshawa, Ontario
91	(United States)	Josh Doan	RW	R	24	2025	Scottsdale, Arizona
92	(Canada)	Colten Ellis	G	L	26	2025	River Denys, Nova Scotia
24	(United States)	Matt Grzelcyk	D	L	32	2026	Boston, Massachusetts
94	(Finland)	Konsta Helenius	C	R	20	2024	Ylöjärvi, Finland
48	(Canada)	Tyson Kozak	C	L	23	2021	Souris, Manitoba
19	(Canada)	Peyton Krebs	C	L	25	2021	Okotoks, Alberta
20	(Czech Republic)	Jiří Kulich	C	L	22	2022	Kadaň, Czech Republic
1	(Finland)	Ukko-Pekka Luukkonen	G	L	27	2017	Espoo, Finland
34	(United States)	Alex Lyon	G	L	33	2025	Baudette, Minnesota
29	(Canada)	Beck Malenstyn	LW	L	28	2024	Delta, British Columbia
71	(Canada)	Ryan McLeod	C	L	27	2024	Mississauga, Ontario
73	(United States)	Zach Metsa	D	R	28	2025	Delafield, Wisconsin
9	(United States)	Josh Norris	C	L	27	2025	Oxford, Michigan
86	(Sweden)	Noah Östlund	C	L	22	2022	Nykvarn, Sweden
25	(Canada)	Owen Power	D	L	23	2021	Mississauga, Ontario
22	(Canada)	Jack Quinn	RW	R	25	2020	Ottawa, Ontario
23	(United States)	Mattias Samuelsson (A)	D	L	26	2018	Philadelphia, Pennsylvania
72	(United States)	Tage Thompson (A)	C	R	29	2018	Phoenix, Arizona
21	(Canada)	Conor Timmins	D	R	28	2025	St. Catharines, Ontario
8	(Canada)	Olen Zellweger	D	L	23	2026	Calgary, Alberta
17	(United States)	Jason Zucker	LW	L	34	2024	Newport Beach, California

=== Team captains ===
- Floyd Smith, 1970–1971
- Gerry Meehan, 1971–1974
- Jim Schoenfeld, 1974–1977
- Danny Gare, 1977–1981
- Gilbert Perreault, 1981–1986
- Lindy Ruff, 1986–1989
- Mike Foligno, 1989–1990
- Mike Ramsey, 1991–1992
- Pat LaFontaine, 1992–1997
- Alexander Mogilny, 1993–1994 (interim)
- Michael Peca, 1997–2000
- Stu Barnes, 2001–2003
- Rotating, 2003–2004
  - Miroslav Šatan, October 2003
  - Chris Drury, November 2003
  - James Patrick, December 2003
  - Jean-Pierre Dumont, January 2004
  - Daniel Briere, February 2004
  - Chris Drury, March–April 2004
- Daniel Briere and Chris Drury, 2005–2007 (co-captains)
- Rotating, 2007–2008
  - Jochen Hecht, October 2007
  - Toni Lydman, November 2007
  - Brian Campbell, December 2007
  - Jaroslav Špaček, January 2008
  - Jochen Hecht, February 2008
  - Jason Pominville, March–April 2008
- Craig Rivet, 2008–2011
- Jason Pominville, 2011–2013
- Steve Ott and Thomas Vanek, October 2013 (co-captains)
- Steve Ott, 2013–2014
- Brian Gionta, 2014–2017
- Jack Eichel, 2018–2021
- Kyle Okposo, 2022–2024
- Rasmus Dahlin, 2024–present

=== Front office ===
Jarmo Kekäläinen, who previously served as general manager of the Columbus Blue Jackets from 2013 to 2024, was named general manager on December 15, 2025. He had previously been hired by the team in May 2025 as a senior advisor.

=== Head coaches ===
The Sabres named Lindy Ruff head coach on April 22, 2024. He returned for a second tenure with the team, after previously coaching Buffalo from 1997 to 2013.

Of the 20 head coaches the Sabres have used in their history, seven of them had previously played for the Sabres during their playing career: Floyd Smith, Bill Inglis, Jim Schoenfeld, Craig Ramsay, Rick Dudley, Ruff, and Phil Housley. Two others, Dan Bylsma and Ted Nolan, had played in the Sabres' farm system.

=== First-round draft picks ===
- 1970: Gilbert Perreault (1st overall)
- 1971: Rick Martin (5th overall)
- 1972: Jim Schoenfeld (5th overall)
- 1973: Morris Titanic (12th overall)
- 1974: Lee Fogolin (11th overall)
- 1975: Bob Sauvé (17th overall)
- 1977: Ric Seiling (14th overall)
- 1978: Larry Playfair (13th overall)
- 1979: Mike Ramsey (11th overall)
- 1980: Steve Patrick (20th overall)
- 1981: Jiří Dudáček (17th overall)
- 1982: Phil Housley (6th overall), Paul Cyr (9th overall), Dave Andreychuk (16th overall)
- 1983: Tom Barrasso (5th overall), Normand Lacombe (10th overall), Adam Creighton (11th overall)
- 1984: Mikael Andersson (18th overall)
- 1985: Calle Johansson (14th overall)
- 1986: Shawn Anderson (5th overall)
- 1987: Pierre Turgeon (1st overall)
- 1988: Joel Savage (13th overall)
- 1989: Kevin Haller (14th overall)
- 1990: Brad May (14th overall)
- 1991: Philippe Boucher (13th overall)
- 1992: David Cooper (11th overall)
- 1994: Wayne Primeau (17th overall)
- 1995: Jay McKee (14th overall), Martin Biron (16th overall)
- 1996: Erik Rasmussen (7th overall)
- 1997: Mika Noronen (21st overall)
- 1998: Dmitri Kalinin (18th overall)
- 1999: Barrett Heisten (20th overall)
- 2000: Artyom Kryukov (15th overall)
- 2001: Jiří Novotný (22nd overall)
- 2002: Keith Ballard (11th overall), Daniel Paille (20th overall)
- 2003: Thomas Vanek (5th overall)
- 2004: Drew Stafford (13th overall)
- 2005: Marek Zagrapan (13th overall)
- 2006: Dennis Persson (24th overall)
- 2008: Tyler Myers (12th overall), Tyler Ennis (26th overall)
- 2009: Zack Kassian (13th overall)
- 2010: Mark Pysyk (23rd overall)
- 2011: Joel Armia (16th overall)
- 2012: Mikhail Grigorenko (12th overall), Zemgus Girgensons (14th overall)
- 2013: Rasmus Ristolainen (8th overall), Nikita Zadorov (16th overall)
- 2014: Sam Reinhart (2nd overall)
- 2015: Jack Eichel (2nd overall)
- 2016: Alexander Nylander (8th overall)
- 2017: Casey Mittelstadt (8th overall)
- 2018: Rasmus Dahlin (1st overall)
- 2019: Dylan Cozens (7th overall), Ryan Johnson (31st overall)
- 2020: Jack Quinn (8th overall)
- 2021: Owen Power (1st overall), Isak Rosén (14th overall)
- 2022: Matthew Savoie (9th overall), Noah Ostlund (16th overall), Jiří Kulich (28th overall)
- 2023: Zach Benson (13th overall)
- 2024: Konsta Helenius (14th overall)
- 2025: Radim Mrtka (9th overall)
- 2026: Daxon Rudolph (4th overall), Ilia Morozov (20th overall)

== Team and league honors ==
=== Hockey Hall of Famers ===
The Buffalo Sabres has an affiliation with a number of inductees to the Hockey Hall of Fame. Sabres inductees include 14 former players and four builders of the sport. The four individuals recognized as builders by the Hall of Fame includes former general managers, head coaches, and owners. In addition to players and builders, three broadcasters for the Buffalo Sabres were also awarded the Foster Hewitt Memorial Award from the Hockey Hall of Fame, Ted Darling in 1994, Rick Jeanneret in 2012, and Harry Neale in 2013.

Four sports writers from publications based in Buffalo, and St. Catharines, Ontario (which is within Buffalo's media territory), were also awarded the Elmer Ferguson Memorial Award from the Hockey Hall of Fame. Recipients of the award include Charlie Barton (Buffalo Courier-Express) in 1985, Dick Johnston (Buffalo News) in 1986, Jack Gatecliff (St. Catharines Standard) in 1995, and Jim Kelley (Buffalo News) in 2004.

Players

- Dave Andreychuk
- Tom Barrasso
- Dick Duff
- Grant Fuhr
- Clark Gillies
- Doug Gilmour
- Dominik Hašek
- Dale Hawerchuk
- Tim Horton
- Phil Housley
- Pat LaFontaine
- Alexander Mogilny
- Gilbert Perreault
- Pierre Turgeon

Builders

- Scotty Bowman
- Punch Imlach
- Seymour H. Knox III
- Roger Neilson

=== Retired numbers ===
Buffalo Sabres retired numbers
No.	Player	Position	Career	Number retirement
2	Tim Horton	D	1972–1974	January 5, 1996
7	Rick Martin	LW	1971–1981	November 15, 1995 ^{1}
11	Gilbert Perreault	C	1970–1987	October 17, 1990 ^{1}
14	René Robert	RW	1972–1979	November 15, 1995 ^{1}
16	Pat LaFontaine	C	1991–1997	March 3, 2006
18	Danny Gare	RW	1974–1981	November 22, 2005
30	Ryan Miller	G	2002–2014	January 19, 2023
39	Dominik Hašek	G	1992–2001	January 13, 2015

- ^{1} When the No. 14 of Robert and the No. 7 of Martin were retired, Gilbert Perreault was present, as the entire "French Connection" line was given retirement together. Perreault's No. 11 was lowered and then raised back in the center under the French Connection banner, as shown above.
- SHK III and NRK (team founders Seymour H. Knox III and Northrup R. Knox. Two banners bearing their initials and the Sabres blue and gold reside in the KeyBank Center's rafters.)
- RJ (longtime play-by-play announcer Rick Jeanneret. A banner bearing his initials was raised on April 1, 2022.)
- Although Alexander Mogilny's number 89 is not officially retired by the team, it has only been issued once since his departure following the 1994–95 season, to Alex Tuch in 2021. Cory Conacher switched to 88 expressly out of deference to Mogilny in 2014. Likewise, Ryan Miller, who traditionally wore 39, wore 30 during his time with the Sabres out of deference to Hašek, long before 39 was announced to be retired. Miller's number 30 would also eventually be retired on January 19, 2023.
- The NHL retired Wayne Gretzky's No. 99 for all its member teams at the 2000 NHL All-Star Game.

=== Buffalo Sabres Hall of Fame ===
1980

- Frank Christie
- Roger Crozier
- George "Punch" Imlach

1982

- Tim Horton
- Fred Hunt

1986

- David Forman
- Don Luce
- Craig Ramsay

1989

- Rick Martin
- Gilbert Perreault
- Rene Robert

1994

- Danny Gare

1995

- Jim Schoenfeld
- Robert O. Swados

1996

- Ted Darling
- Seymour H. Knox III
- Northrup R. Knox

1998

- Jack Gatecliff
- Larry Playfair

2000

- Don Edwards
- Bill Hajt
- Wayne Redshaw
- Robert "Rip" Simonick

2001

- Jerry Korab
- Mike Racicot
- Mike Ramsey

2005

- Mike Foligno
- Dick Johnston
- Pat LaFontaine
- Rudy Migay
- Robert E. Rich, Jr.
- George Strawbridge

2007

- Phil Housley

2009

- Dave Andreychuk
- Milt Ellis

2010

- Joe Crozier
- Jim Lorentz

2011

- Alexander Mogilny
- Jim Kelley

2012

- Dale Hawerchuk
- Rick Jeanneret

2014

- Dominik Hašek

2023

- Ryan Miller

2025

- Rob Ray

=== Franchise leaders ===
==== Scoring leaders ====
These are the top-ten-point-scorers in franchise regular season history. Figures are updated after each completed NHL regular season.

- * – current Sabres player

Note: Pos = Position; GP = Games played; G = Goals; A = Assists; Pts = Points; P/G = Points per game

Points
Player	Pos	GP	G	A	Pts	P/G
Gilbert Perreault	C	1,191	512	814	1,326	1.11
Dave Andreychuk	LW	837	368	436	804	.96
Rick Martin	LW	681	382	313	695	1.02
Craig Ramsay	LW	1,070	252	420	672	.63
Phil Housley	D	608	178	380	558	.92
René Robert	RW	524	222	330	552	1.05
Don Luce	C	766	216	310	526	.69
Jason Pominville	RW	733	217	304	521	.71
Mike Foligno	RW	664	247	264	511	.77
Danny Gare	RW	503	267	233	500	.99

Goals
Player	Pos	G
Gilbert Perreault	C	512
Rick Martin	LW	382
Dave Andreychuk	LW	368
Danny Gare	RW	267
Thomas Vanek	LW	254
Craig Ramsay	LW	252
Mike Foligno	RW	247
Miroslav Šatan	RW	224
René Robert	RW	222
Jason Pominville	RW	217

Assists
Player	Pos	A
Gilbert Perreault	C	814
Dave Andreychuk	LW	436
Craig Ramsay	LW	420
Phil Housley	D	380
Rasmus Dahlin*	D	332
René Robert	RW	330
Rick Martin	LW	313
Don Luce	C	310
Jason Pominville	RW	304
Dale Hawerchuk	C	275

==== Goaltending leaders ====
These goaltenders rank in the top ten in franchise history for wins. Figures are updated after each completed NHL season.

- * – current Sabres player

Note: GP = Games played; W = Wins; L = Losses; T/O = Ties/Overtime losses; GA = Goal against; GAA = Goals against average; SA = Shots against; SV% = Save percentage; SO = Shutouts

Goaltenders
Player	GP	W	L	T/O	GA	GAA	SA	SV%	SO
Ryan Miller	540	284	186	57	1,370	2.60	16,217	.916	28
Dominik Hašek	491	234	170	70	1,062	2.22	14,370	.926	55
Don Edwards	307	156	83	61	869	2.91	8,365	.896	14
Martin Biron	300	134	115	29	707	2.53	7,803	.909	18
Tom Barrasso	266	124	102	28	845	3.29	7,290	.884	13
Bob Sauvé	246	119	76	39	752	3.21	6,126	.877	7
Daren Puppa	215	96	68	28	668	3.41	5,967	.888	5
Ukko-Pekka Luukkonen*	190	93	74	18	538	2.96	5,370	.900	8
Roger Crozier	202	74	76	29	591	3.23	5,953	.901	10
Gerry Desjardins	116	66	30	18	319	2.82	3,017	.894	5

=== Franchise single-season records ===
- Most goals: Alexander Mogilny, 76 (1992–93)
- Most assists: Pat LaFontaine, 95 (1992–93)
- Most points: Pat LaFontaine, 148 (1992–93)
- Most penalty minutes: Rob Ray, 354 (1991–92)
- Most goals, defenseman: Phil Housley, 31 (1983–84)
- Most assists, defenseman: Phil Housley, 60 (1989–90)
- Most points, defenseman: Phil Housley, 81 (1989–90)
- Most goals, rookie: Rick Martin, 44 (1971–72)
- Most assists, rookie: Phil Housley, 47 (1982–83)
- Most points, rookie: Rick Martin, 74 (1971–72)
- Most wins: Ryan Miller, 41 (2009–10)
- Most shutouts: Dominik Hašek, 13 (1997–98)

=== NHL awards and trophies ===
Presidents' Trophy

- 2006–07

Prince of Wales Trophy

- 1974–75, 1979–80, 1998–99

Bill Masterton Memorial Trophy

- Don Luce: 1974–75
- Pat LaFontaine: 1994–95

Calder Memorial Trophy

- Gilbert Perreault: 1970–71
- Tom Barrasso: 1983–84
- Tyler Myers: 2009–10

Frank J. Selke Trophy

- Craig Ramsay: 1984–85
- Michael Peca: 1996–97

Hart Memorial Trophy

- Dominik Hašek: 1996–97, 1997–98

Jack Adams Award

- Ted Nolan: 1996–97
- Lindy Ruff: 2005–06

King Clancy Memorial Trophy

- Rob Ray: 1998–99

Lady Byng Memorial Trophy

- Gilbert Perreault: 1972–73

Lester B. Pearson Award

- Dominik Hašek: 1996–97, 1997–98

Lester Patrick Trophy

- Pat LaFontaine: 1996–97
- Scotty Bowman: 2000–01

NHL Plus/Minus Award

- Thomas Vanek: 2006–07

Vezina Trophy

- Don Edwards and Bob Sauvé: 1979–80
- Tom Barrasso: 1983–84
- Dominik Hašek: 1993–94, 1994–95, 1996–97, 1997–98, 1998–99, 2000–01
- Ryan Miller: 2009–10

William M. Jennings Trophy

- Tom Barrasso and Bob Sauvé: 1984–85
- Dominik Hašek and Grant Fuhr: 1993–94
- Dominik Hašek: 2000–01
