= Knox Farm State Park =

State park in Erie County, New York

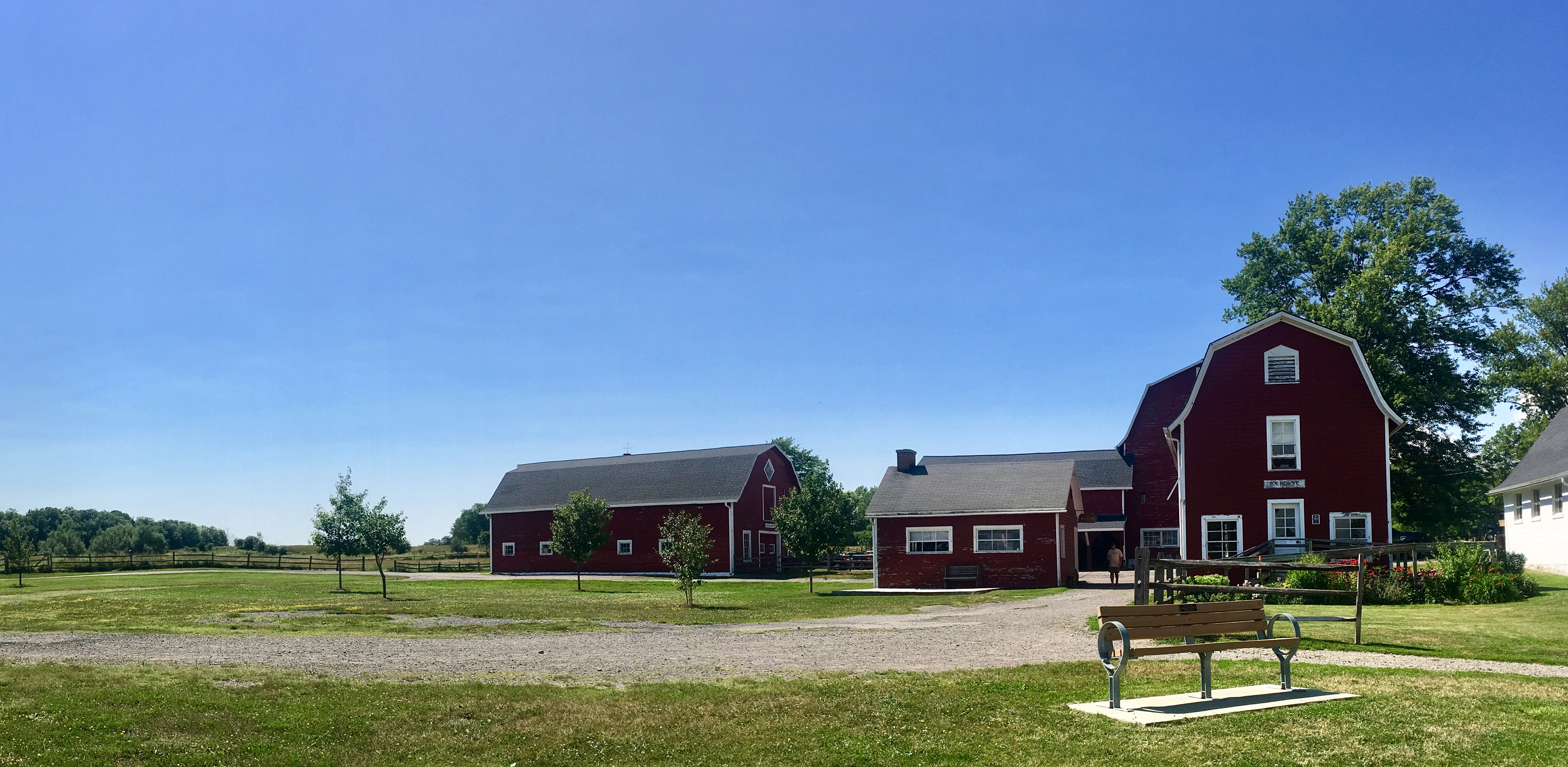
- Many of Knox Farm State Park's farm buildings are still in use.

- Location within New York
- Type: State park
- Location: 437 Buffalo Road; East Aurora, New York
- Nearest city: East Aurora, New York
- Coordinates: 42°46′30″N 78°38′35″W
- Area: 633 acres (256.2 ha)
- Operator: New York State Office of Parks, Recreation and Historic Preservation
- Visitors: 123,908 (in 2010)
- Open: All year
- Website: Knox Farm State Park

Knox Farm State Park is a 633-acre (256.2 ha) state park located in the town of Aurora, Erie County, New York, adjacent to the village of East Aurora. It is the former country estate of the Knox Family of Buffalo.

== Park features ==
The park contains a variety of habitats, including grasslands, woodlands, ponds, and wetlands. The Knox Farm, located within the park, is still home to a number of farm animals, including horses, sheep, goats, llamas, and chickens.

Visitors can observe wildlife, hike, and cross-country ski through a number of nature trails; bicycles, however, are only permitted in certain areas. Nature walks and programs are offered by the New York State Parks Office. The Knox Farm Visitor Center contains exhibits of historical and natural interest.

Nature trails can also be toured on horseback by permit only. Horse owners must also have a current Coggins certificate. The park also offers use of stable facilities and riding lessons. There are also several equestrian events open to the public, such as horse shows, summer polo matches, and an annual carriage drive.

== Friends of Knox Farm State Park ==
The Friends of Knox Farm State Park is a not-for-profit group dedicated to maintaining and promoting the park and its resources. The group holds several events for that purpose. In February 2014, the Friends of Knox Farm Board of Directors voted to replace Seymour Knox IV, who had served as president of the group since its founding in 2006. This resulted in the resignation of eight members of the board including Knox and other members of the Knox family.

== Gallery ==
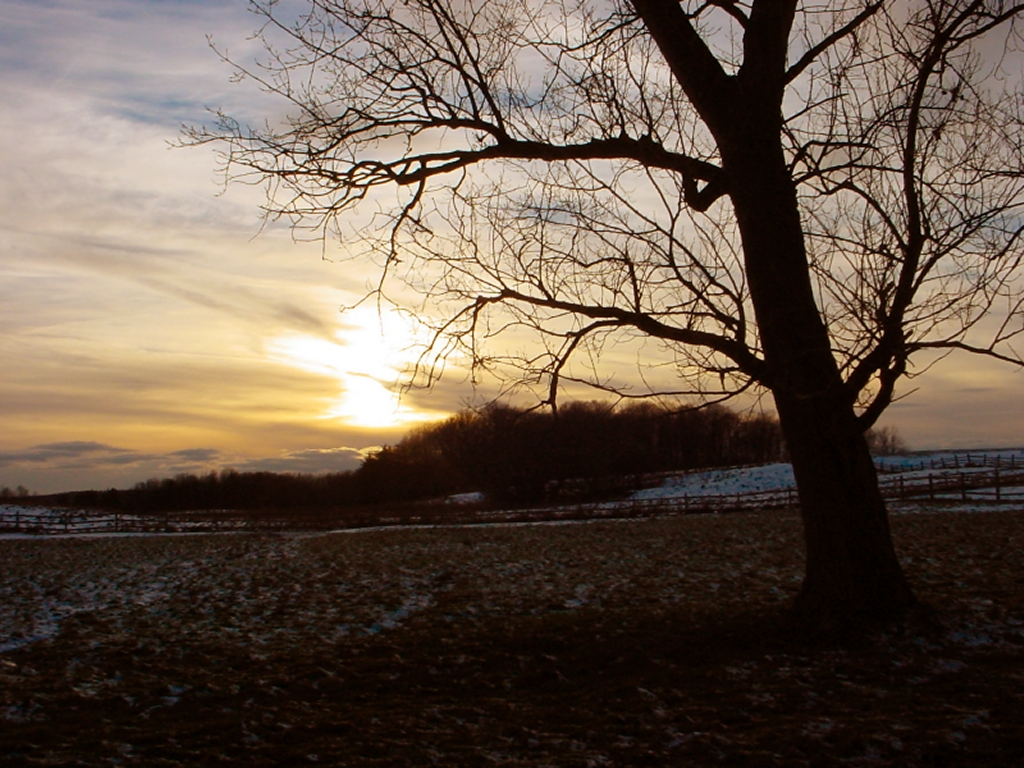
The park at dusk

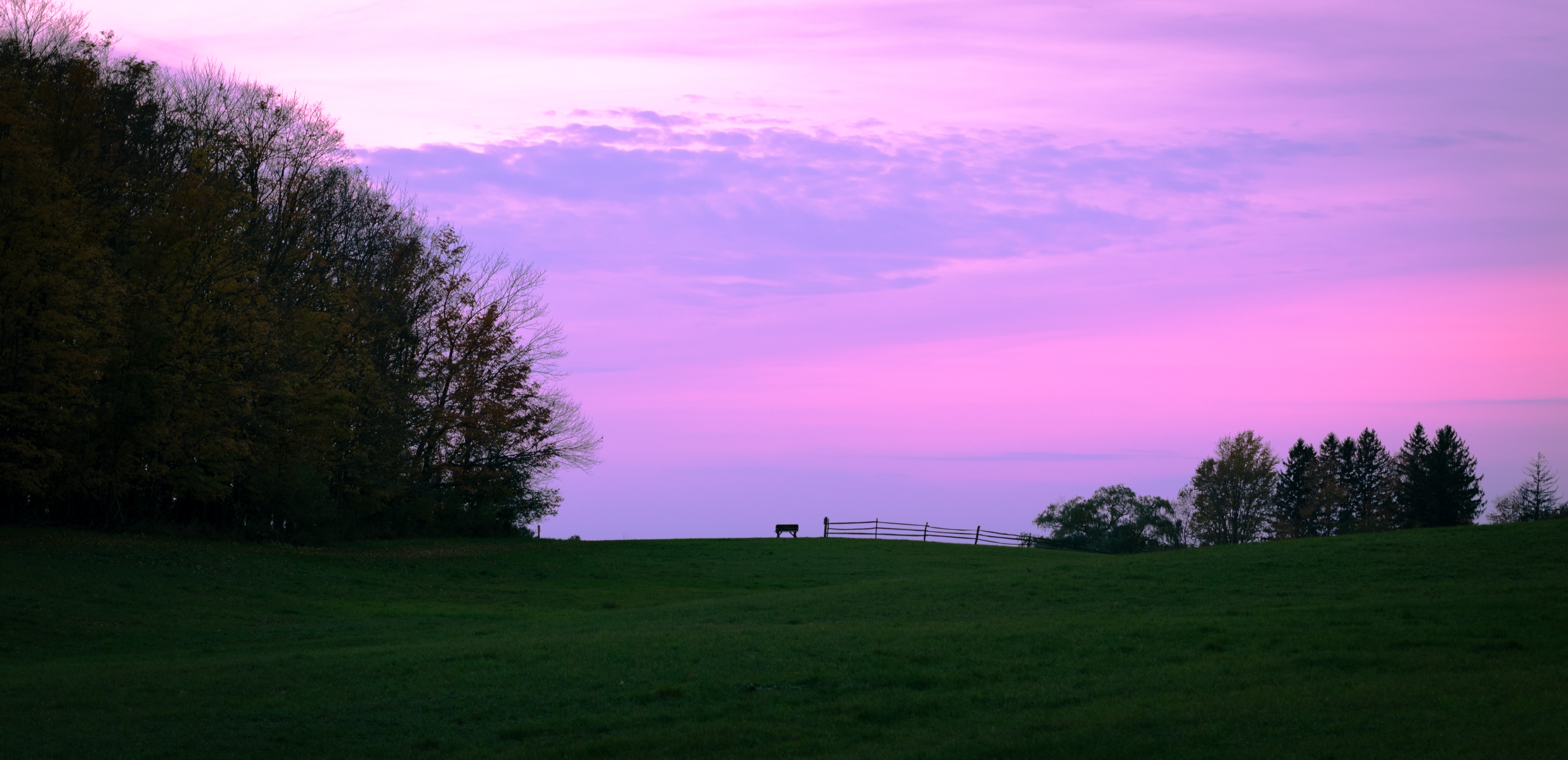
Knox Farm forests at twilight

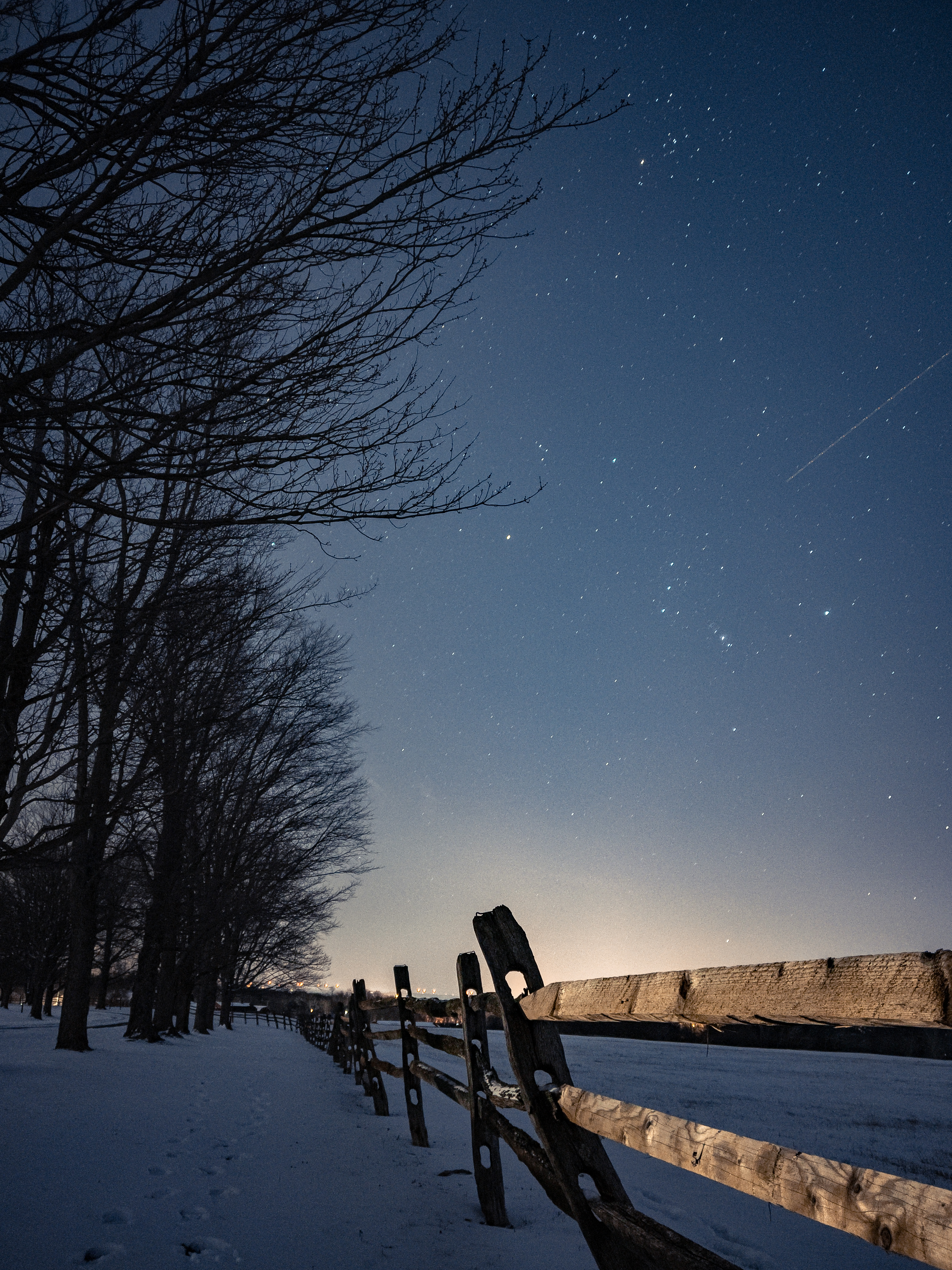
Night over Knox from Willardshire Road

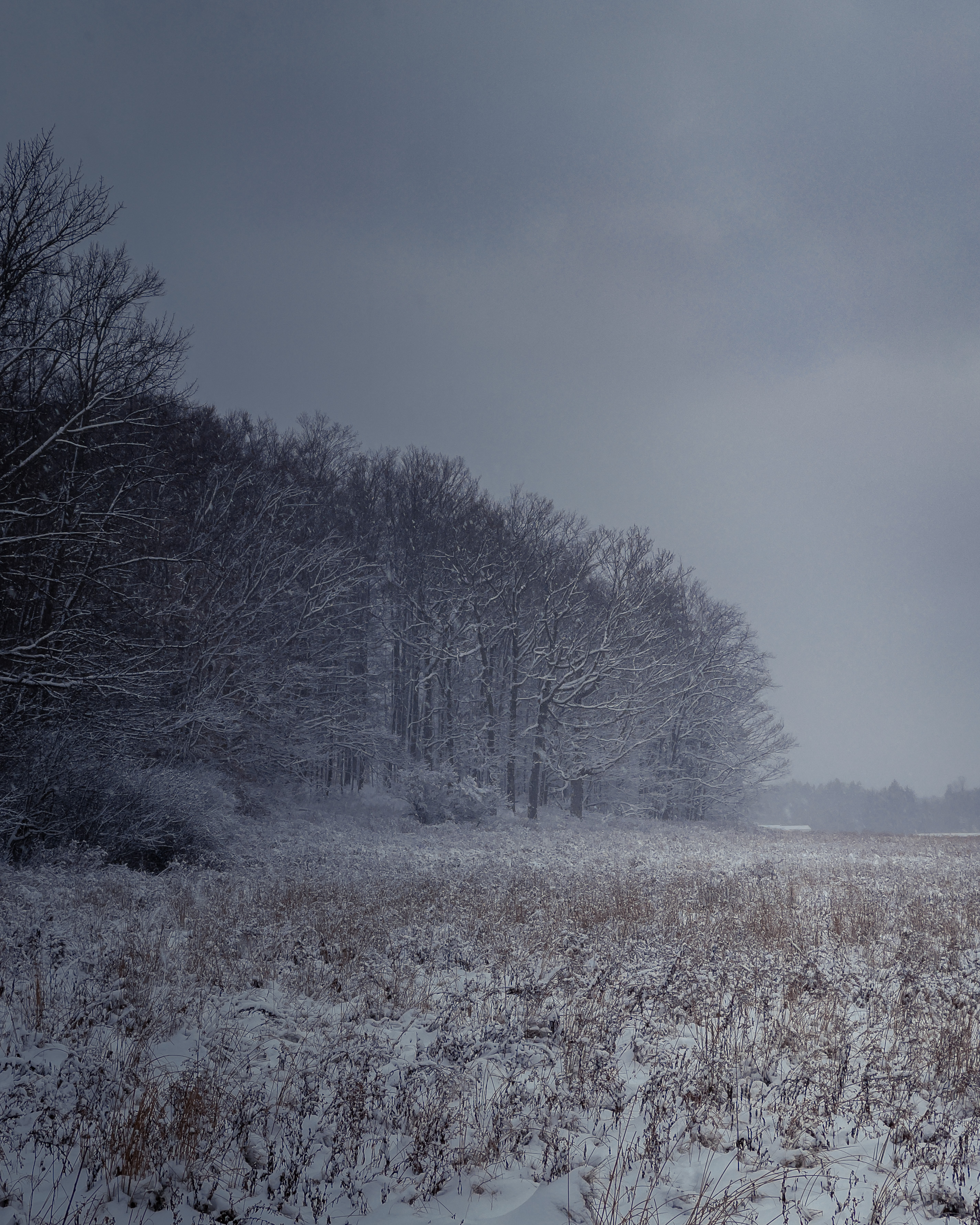
Winter Forests at Knox Farm

== See also ==
- List of New York state parks
