= WNAE (FM) =

Radio station in Clarendon, Pennsylvania

- Clarendon, Pennsylvania; United States
- Broadcast area: Warren, Pennsylvania
- Frequency: 104.3 MHz
- Branding: Kinzua Country 104

Programming
- Format: Country
- Affiliations: Local Radio Networks Pittsburgh Penguins Radio Network

Ownership
- Owner: Lilly Broadcasting; (Lilly Broadcasting of Pennsylvania LLC)
- Sister stations: WICU, WRRN

History
- First air date: August 31, 1995; 30 years ago (as WKNB)
- Former call signs: WOVU (1993–1995); WKNB (1995–2020)
- Call sign meaning: former call sign of WICU, "Northern Allegheny" (area of broadcast)

Technical information
- Licensing authority: FCC
- Facility ID: 34929
- Class: A
- ERP: 4,700 watts
- HAAT: 113 meters (371 ft)
- Transmitter coordinates: 41°48′50.00″N 79°10′4.00″W

Links
- Public license information: Public file; LMS
- Website: kinzuacountry.com

WNAE (104.3 MHz, "Kinzua Country 104") is an FM radio station broadcasting a country music format. WNAE is licensed to serve Clarendon, Pennsylvania, United States. The station is owned by Lilly Broadcasting and features programming from Local Radio Networks.

== History ==
The construction permit for this station was first issued on February 2, 1993, to Cary and Betty Simpson, who were the principal owners of the Allegheny Mountain Network, based in Tyrone, Pennsylvania. It was originally permitted to operate at 106.9 MHz, but at the same operating power it has today. The call sign WOVU was assigned on March 29, 1993. On November 7, 1994, WOVU was granted a construction permit to move to 104.3; WKZA would later take over the 106.9 frequency.

Cary and Betty Simpson sold the WOVU permit to LeRoy Schneck's Kinzua Broadcasting Company, owner of WNAE and WRRN in Warren, for $21,514 in 1994; the sale was completed on February 23, 1995. On July 14, 1995, the station changed its call sign to WKNB. It signed on August 31, 1995, carrying a country music format supplied by the Jones Satellite Network.

Kinzua Broadcasting sold its stations to Frank Iorio, who already owned the construction permit for a station on 102.7 FM in Clarendon, in 2005 for $1.25 million; the new station, which took the call sign WNAE-FM, operated as a simulcast of WKNB from 2008 until its sale to the Family Life Network in 2010. Following a never-completed sale to Laurel Media in 2017, Iorio (who owned the stations under the name Radio Partners LLC) sold WKNB, WRRN, and WNAE to Lilly Broadcasting for $900,000 in 2019, making them sister stations to WICU-TV and WSEE-TV in Erie. Lilly changed the station's call sign to WNAE on March 4, 2020, parking the call sign from its AM sister station to retain rights to the WNAE calls.
