= WNAE =

WNAE may refer to:

- WNAE (FM), a radio station (104.3 FM) licensed to serve Clarendon, Pennsylvania, United States
- WICU (AM), a radio station (1310 AM) licensed to serve Warren, Pennsylvania, which held the call sign WNAE from 1946 to 2020
- WERI (FM), a radio station (102.7 FM) licensed to serve Wattsburg, Pennsylvania, which held the call sign WNAE-FM from 2007 to 2011
- WRRN, a radio station (92.3 FM) licensed to serve Warren, Pennsylvania, which held the call sign WNAE-FM from 1946 to 1951
