= WFHW-LP =

Television station in Buffalo, New York (1989–1999)

- Buffalo, New York; United States
- Channels: Analog: 58 (UHF)
- Branding: WAV-TV 58 (1989–1991); WBCT (We're Buffalo's Community Television) (1991); Community Television from Medaille College (1991–1993); Citizens Television Systems (secondary, 1988–1999)

Programming
- Affiliations: Independent; Channel America (1988–1996); TLC (1988–1991)

Ownership
- Owner: Citizens Television System, Inc.

History
- Founded: July 31, 1985
- First air date: July 13, 1989
- Last air date: October 31, 1999
- Former call signs: W58AV (1989–1996)
- Call sign meaning: Friendship House Western New York

Technical information
- Licensing authority: FCC
- Facility ID: 11381
- Class: TX
- ERP: 15.1 kW
- HAAT: 186 m (610 ft)
- Transmitter coordinates: 42°52′48″N 78°52′36″W

Links
- Public license information: LMS

WFHW-LP (channel 58) was a low-power television station in Buffalo, New York, United States.

== History ==
=== WJTN-TV ===
The channel 58 allocation had originally been allocated to Jamestown, New York, in 1952. It was originally to be built by radio station WJTN, before Sherwin Grossman and Gary Cohen challenged WJTN for the channel 58 allocation. Facing the likelihood of protracted delays in getting channel 58 on the air, Grossman and Cohen dropped their challenge and filed for the channel 17 allocation, WBUF-TV, by December 1952. By Christmas Eve of that year, an application for the adjacent channel 59 in Buffalo was awarded "uncontested" to what would become the short-lived WBES-TV. WJTN never built or signed on its channel 58.

The only commercial effort to serve Jamestown directly with over-the-air television since the aborted launch of WJTN-TV was in the late 1960s, when WJTN's crosstown rival WKSN—then owned by future Pax TV and HSN founder Bud Paxson—launched WNYP (the forerunner of current religious broadcaster WNYB) on channel 26.

=== W58AV ===
In summer 1989, consumer rights advocate Ralph Nader reactivated Western New York's channel 58 allocation with the launch of translator station W58AV. The station had first unsuccessfully applied for the call sign WBCT (for "Buffalo Community Television") and indeed used the acronym for a time as its on-air branding, but ceased doing so to avoid conflict with a station in Bridgeport, Connecticut that then used the same letters. The station's signal broadcast from a transmitter at the top of One Marine Midland Center in downtown Buffalo, with an initial power of 100 watts (later upgraded to 1,000, and finally, 15,100 watts). From the beginning, the station aired a large amount of locally produced fare, with programming from Channel America, as well as a partnership with The Learning Channel. By 1991, the station had partnered up with Medaille College, though this would only last until January 1, 1993.

=== WFHW-LP ===
At some point in the mid-1990s, the station upgraded from translator to LPTV status, and changed its call letters to WFHW-LP after what would become its last operator, the local chapter of the non-profit Friendship House. The station went silent on Halloween in 1999 after the Friendship House ceased operations, several years before the digital television transition in the United States. Channel 58 would not be reissued; it was deleted along with all others over 36 in a series of spectrum reallocations.
