= WHUG =

Radio station in Jamestown, New York

- Jamestown, New York; United States
- Frequency: 101.9 MHz
- Branding: My Country 101.9

Programming
- Format: Country music

Ownership
- Owner: Lilly Broadcasting; (Glenora Radio Network LLC)
- Sister stations: WJTN, WKSN, WKZA, WQFX-FM, WWSE

History
- First air date: April 26, 1965
- Former call signs: WHUG (1965–2001); WMHU (2001–2004)
- Call sign meaning: "Huggin' Country" (former slogan)

Technical information
- Licensing authority: FCC
- Facility ID: 65591
- Class: A
- ERP: 6,000 watts
- HAAT: 100.0 meters (328.1 ft)
- Transmitter coordinates: 42°07′53″N 79°13′13″W

Links
- Public license information: Public file; LMS
- Webcast: Listen live
- Website: whug.com

WHUG (101.9 FM) is a radio station broadcasting a country music format. Licensed to Jamestown, New York, United States, the station is currently owned by Lilly Broadcasting.

Local disc jockeys heard on this station include Dan Warren (The My Country Morning Show; 6-10 am Monday - Friday) Matt Warren (Middays with Matt Warren;- 12-3 pm Monday - Friday) and Chris Sprague (3-7 pm Monday - Friday). Syndicated/national programming on WHUG includes Honky Tonkin' with Tracy Lawrence, ZMax Racing Country, Rise Up Country, NASCAR USA and Country Countdown USA.

== History ==
The station went on the air in 1965 at the 101.7 frequency as WXYJ-FM under the ownership of Bud Paxson; it signed on at roughly the same time as what was then its sister station, WNYP-TV. It later changed to WHUG, "Huggin' Country", and ultimately moved to 101.9 MHz; this was part of an agreement between WHUG and WXOX in Attica so that both could increase their power. It has long been Jamestown's country music outlet. The station changed call signs to WMHU, "102 Moo", in January 2001. The station changed its call sign back to the current WHUG in 2004.

From 1994 until his death in 2012, Bruce Baker hosted his long-running three-hour classic country program on the station on Saturday mornings. The classic country block continued in the time slot until 2024, when WHUG replaced it with syndication.

Lilly Broadcasting, owner of WICU-TV and operator of WSEE-TV in Erie, Pennsylvania, acquired Media One's radio stations in Ashtabula and Jamestown, New York, in December 2025 for a combined $4 million.
