= WICU =

WICU may refer to:

- WICU (Wingman Intermediate Cruise Unit), a new airborne platform operating between the cruise missile and the wingman, Estonia
- WICU (AM), a radio station (1310 AM) licensed to serve Warren, Pennsylvania, United States
- WICU-FM, a radio station (92.7 FM) licensed to serve Lawrence Park, Pennsylvania
- WICU-TV, a television station (channel 12) licensed to serve Erie, Pennsylvania
- WFNN, a radio station (1330 AM) licensed to serve Erie, Pennsylvania, which held the call sign WICU from 1957 to 1967
