= WQFX-FM =

Radio station in Russell, Pennsylvania

- Russell, Pennsylvania; United States
- Broadcast area: Jamestown, New York
- Frequency: 103.1 MHz
- Branding: Rock 103

Programming
- Format: Mainstream rock
- Affiliations: Compass Media Networks; United Stations Radio Networks; Cleveland Browns Radio Network; Sabres Hockey Network

Ownership
- Owner: Lilly Broadcasting; (Glenora Radio Network LLC)
- Sister stations: WHUG, WJTN, WKSN, WKZA, WWSE

History
- First air date: August 15, 1984
- Former call signs: WGSI (1984–1992); WRLP (1992–2000)
- Call sign meaning: Former "Fox" brand

Technical information
- Licensing authority: FCC
- Facility ID: 39622
- Class: A
- ERP: 2,500 watts
- HAAT: 107 meters (351 ft)
- Transmitter coordinates: 41°57′48.00″N 79°9′42.00″W

Links
- Public license information: Public file; LMS
- Webcast: Listen live
- Website: mediaonegroupradio.com/on-air/wqfx-fm

WQFX-FM (103.1 FM) is a radio station licensed to Russell, Pennsylvania, United States, and serving the Jamestown, New York and Warren, Pennsylvania areas. Owned by Lilly Broadcasting, WQFX airs a mainstream rock format and is the area affiliate for the Cleveland Browns Radio Network and the Sabres Hockey Network.

On August 1, 2019, WQFX returned to its 1990s-era branding of "Rock 103" (having been branded as "103.1 The Fox" for most of the 21st century to that point) and repositioned itself as a mainstream/active rock station with more recent rock tracks.

== History ==
This station first went on the air, as WGSI, on August 15, 1984. On June 22, 1992 they changed their call sign to WRLP, and to the current WQFX on July 18, 2000.

WRLP was an abbreviation of Russell, Pennsylvania, the city that the station's studios were located during that time period. Under this callsign, the station had been known as Rock 103, but would be rebranded to "103.1 The Point," for a short time in the late 1990s. By 1999, they reverted back to the latter, and eventually changed to The Fox, to reflect the new WQFX callsign.

After Media One Group acquired the station in the 2000s, its studios would be moved to the nearby city of Jamestown, NY, along with its sister stations.

Under The Fox branding, the station aired a unique locally-programmed playlist consisting mainly of classic rock songs from the 1960s-1980s, which included many deep cuts.

Following the frequency change of nearby rock station WRKT, which previously had moderate signal in this area, The Fox started including newer cuts from the 1990s and 2000s in a move to fill in the void that station had left behind, as its signal wasn't as strong under the new frequency.

As time went on, they began adding more newer songs into rotation, while cutting back on the traditional classic rock songs. Today, they still include older cuts, but their playlist mostly consists of songs from the 21st century.

Lilly Broadcasting, owner of WICU-TV and operator of WSEE-TV in Erie, Pennsylvania, acquired Media One's radio stations in Ashtabula and Jamestown, New York, in December 2025 for a combined $4 million.
