= WJTN =

Radio station in Jamestown, New York

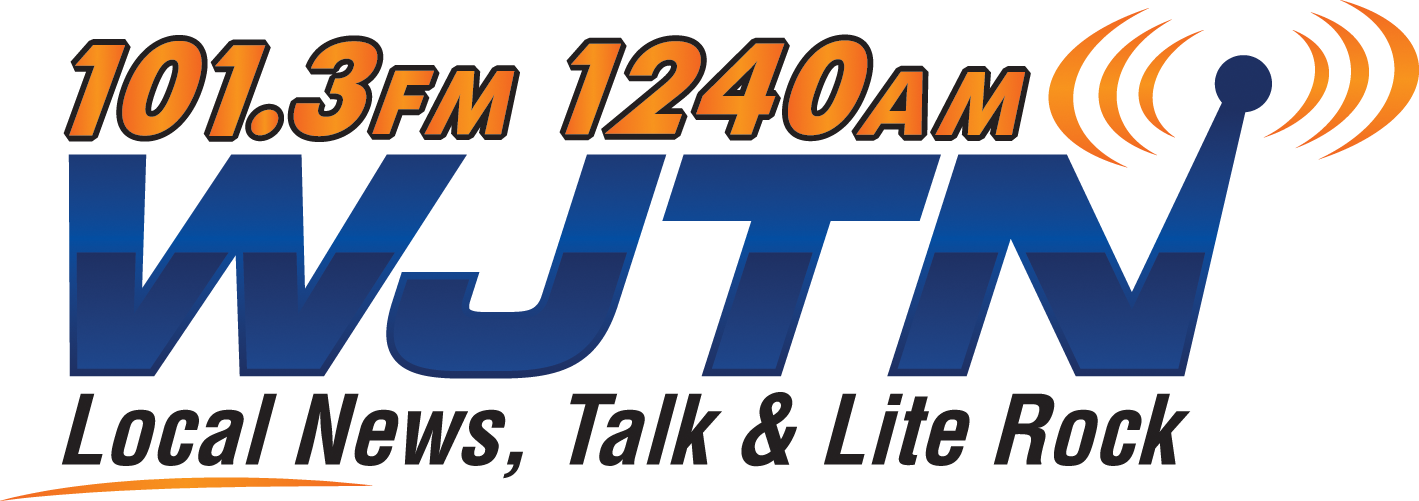
- Jamestown, New York; United States
- Frequency: 1240 kHz
- Branding: 101-3 & 1240 WJTN

Programming
- Format: Full-service; gold-based adult contemporary
- Affiliations: ABC News Radio; Compass Media Networks; Premiere Networks; Westwood One

Ownership
- Owner: Lilly Broadcasting; (Glenora Radio Network LLC)
- Sister stations: WHUG, WKSN, WKZA, WQFX-FM, WWSE

History
- First air date: December 31, 1924
- Former call signs: WOCL (1924–1936)
- Call sign meaning: Jamestown

Technical information
- Licensing authority: FCC
- Facility ID: 29922
- Class: C
- Power: 500 watts (day); 1,000 watts (night)
- Transmitter coordinates: 42°06′17″N 79°15′27″W
- Translator: 101.3 W267CN (Jamestown)

Links
- Public license information: Public file; LMS
- Webcast: Listen live
- Website: wjtn.com

WJTN (1240 AM) is a radio station licensed to Jamestown, New York, United States. The station is owned by Lilly Broadcasting. On December 31, 1924, the station signed on, making the station the oldest in southwestern New York and third-longest lived in all of Western New York—behind only WGR and WDCZ.

As of spring 2018, WJTN broadcasts a 1970s and 1980s-centered classic hits and adult contemporary music format with local news and sports.

== Programming ==
Local personalities include Dennis Webster, Dan Warren and Lee John.

The station airs ABC News Radio every hour and Local News throughout the day with Webster and Terry Frank.

Syndicated programming heard on WJTN include John Tesh, and Coast to Coast AM. On weekends, the station features Connie Selleca Saturday mornings and Tesh.

Weekend programming includes "The Times of Your Life", which is hosted by Andrew Hill and Russ Diethrick. WJTN's "High School Bowl" quizbowl also airs during the school year.

Jamestown High School football, boys basketball and hockey play-by-play is featured during the school year.

== History ==
The station was first licensed to the Hotel Jamestown on December 27, 1924, with the requested call letters of WOCL ("We're On Chautauqua Lake"), and signed on four days later. In 1936 the call letters were changed to WJTN.

In 1952, WJTN held a construction permit for what would have been Jamestown's first commercial television service. A UHF station licensed to channel 58, WJTN-TV was abandoned after two Buffalo businessmen made their own bid for the channel 58 allocation, only to abandon it themselves by 1953 to pursue a station in Buffalo, WBUF-TV, which itself was a commercial failure. Jamestown would never emerge as a standalone television market, instead relying on stations from Buffalo and Erie, Pennsylvania for television service.

Pete Hubbell served as WJTN's sports director from 1962 until the late 1990s; he died in 2025, age 89. Hubbell was the son of Ralph Hubbell, a sports announcer in Buffalo, and the younger Hubbell served as the Buffalo Bills' inaugural public address announcer during the team's time at War Memorial Stadium.

Lilly Broadcasting, owner of WICU-TV and operator of WSEE-TV in Erie, Pennsylvania, acquired Media One's radio stations in Ashtabula and Jamestown, New York, in December 2025 for a combined $4 million.

== FM translator ==
On January 15, 2018, WJTN announced plans to acquire an FM translator on 101.3 MHz to simulcast WJTN's programming. Along with the new simulcast, the station shifted to a gold-based adult contemporary music format (picking up some of the older cuts from the library from WWSE and dropping most of its easy listening instrumentals in most dayparts; easy listening and other adult standards would return in another realignment on WKSN in 2023). The translator signed on in May 2018.

== Jim Roselle ==
WJTN's mid-morning man, Jim Roselle, was inducted into the New York State Broadcasters Hall of Fame in June 2010. Roselle spent more than 60 years broadcasting on WJTN in Jamestown. After graduating from Jamestown High School in 1944 Jim Roselle attended St. Lawrence University where he received a bachelor's degree in business administration, while minoring in radio programming and production. It was his experience as a play-by-play broadcaster for S.L.U. football, basketball, and baseball teams that would be a springboard to a life of success.

In 1953 Roselle began his radio career at WJTN in Jamestown, New York. Little did Roselle know that what started, as a part-time sportscaster job was truly the beginning of a life of excellence in broadcast and community involvement. This broadcast excellence has bestowed many career highlights upon Roselle, from world travel to London with Jamestown Community College, to the Soviet Union representing the Chautauqua Institution, with the Jamestown High School Acapella Choir to Austria, Germany and Italy, Jamestown High School Band to Macy's Parade and Rose Parade and a week of broadcasting live from Disney World.

Roselle is known for his interviews, most of which came from his Bestor Plaza Studio at the world-famous Chautauqua Institution, starting in the summer of 1974. Roselle has interviewed hundreds of powerful speakers including: then-Governor Bill Clinton, Senator Hillary Rodham Clinton, political humorist Mark Russell, Jane Goodall, Lucille Ball, Tim Russert, fitness guru Richard Simmons, Margaret Meade, Loretta Lorouche, Rocky Marciano. Historians and Pulitzer Prize winners David McCullough, Doris Kearns Goodwin, and James McPherson. Poet-laureates Robert Pinskey, Stanley Kunitze and Billy Collins. Eliot Spitzer and Phil Donahue. Authors - E.L. Doctorow, Joyce Carol Oates, Amy Tan, Roger Rosenblatt. Lee Hamilton: Co-Chairman of the 9/11 Commission, Hamilton Jordan - President Carter's Chief of Staff, as well as Kings and Queens.

His style of interviewing was much different from those of other talk radio personalities. Roselle did detailed research on the people and subjects of his interviews, and his knowledge and insight often surprised and impressed his guests. Roselle featured "on air conversation" not just stereotype interviews.

While most known for his on-air role, it is the common person in the local community that Jim related to most, as signified by his show's opening, "Good morning hometown Jamestown and neighbors! Join me in a cup of happiness!" The community woke up to his voice every day, but most are unaware of his community affiliations and passions. He has been a member of the board of directors for the Lucille Ball Little Theatre for over 30 years; the Jamestown Boys and Girls club for more than 25 years; and most recently at the James Prendergast Library. He also has been the chairman for many community events and enjoyed golfing when he had the chance.

Roselle died on March 23, 2016, at the age of 89. WJTN continues to carry regular interviews from Chautauqua Institution after Roselle's death.
