= WZMQ =

Television station in Marquette, Michigan

- Marquette, Michigan; United States
- Channels: Digital: 19 (UHF); Virtual: 19
- Branding: WZMQ TV19; MeTV Marquette; CBS 19; 19 News (DT2)

Programming
- Affiliations: 19.1: MeTV; 19.2: CBS; for others, see § Subchannels

Ownership
- Owner: Lilly Broadcasting; (WZMQ, LLC)

History
- Founded: October 5, 2001
- First air date: February 2, 2003
- Former call signs: WMQF (2003–2009)
- Former channel numbers: Analog: 19 (UHF, 2003–2009)
- Former affiliations: Fox (2003–2009); UPN (secondary, 2003–2006); MyNetworkTV (secondary, 2006–2009 and 2011); Dark (2009); This TV (2009–2011)
- Call sign meaning: Marquette

Technical information
- Licensing authority: FCC
- Facility ID: 81448
- ERP: 120 kW
- HAAT: 174 m (571 ft)
- Transmitter coordinates: 46°30′6.2″N 87°38′56″W

Links
- Public license information: Public file; LMS
- Website: wzmq19.com

WZMQ (channel 19) is a television station licensed to Marquette, Michigan, United States, serving the Central and Western Upper Peninsula of Michigan as an affiliate of MeTV and CBS. Owned by Lilly Broadcasting, the station maintains studios on West Washington Street in Marquette, while its transmitter is located in Ishpeming, Michigan.

Launched as a Fox affiliate in 2003, WMQF lost the affiliation in 2009 as the result of the financial collapse of its original owner, Equity Media Holdings, which was unable to build out the digital transmission facility. The station then was sold and returned to air later in 2009 after changing its call sign to WZMQ, affiliated with several digital multicast networks. Lilly acquired WZMQ in 2017 and obtained the CBS affiliation for the station's second digital subchannel beginning January 21, 2022, displacing WJMN-TV (channel 3), then owned by Nexstar (it is now a semi-satellite of WBUP).

== History ==
Logo as Fox affiliate WMQF (2003–2009).

The station launched on February 2, 2003, as Fox affiliate WMQF. Prior to WMQF's launch, Fox programming was seen in the Upper Peninsula on a limited basis—either over-the-air (on WLUC-TV, which aired the network's programs from 1992 to 1995, or Green Bay's WLUK-TV) or Charter cable systems (which imported either WLUK or Cadillac's WFQX-TV). WMQF also had a secondary affiliation with UPN, broadcasting that network's programming during off-network hours. (UPN was previously affiliated with the Crystal Falls Class A station WUPT-CA, which folded after losing UPN to WMQF.) After UPN folded in 2006, WMQF adopted a second affiliation with MyNetworkTV, effectively using the station to program the later portions of prime time after Fox programming.

WMQF was originally owned and operated by Equity Media Holdings. WMQF had no physical presence in the Upper Peninsula under Equity's ownership other than the transmitter. The company central-cast 100% of WMQF's programming (as it did with its other stations) from its headquarters in Little Rock, Arkansas. In addition to network and syndicated programming, Equity would air two programs on WMQF produced for its Retro Television Network at the time, the conservative political talk shows Unreliable Sources and Closing Remarks. Throughout its history (and especially during its early days), picking up WMQF over-the-air was a challenge to viewers due to its relatively weak 500,000-watt analog signal. When WMQF was picked up, its signal and picture quality could still tend to be sub-par. As with other Equity central-casting operations (such as Lexington, Kentucky's WBLU-LP), viewer, advertiser and vendor questions and concerns about reception went unanswered without any local staff (the station's engineer serving a number of Equity stations came into Marquette only when required); the station's website did not help as it was a crude local Yahoo!-style business guide with little to no information about the station's programming, contact links, or operations outside of basic Fox programming synopses. As a result, most cable providers chose to obtain WMQF's signal directly off the satellite uplink to the transmitter (it was available free-to-air on the Galaxy 18 satellite system).

On December 8, 2008, Equity Media Holdings filed for Chapter 11 bankruptcy, resulting in the auction of all its television stations the following April. WMQF would be sold to MMMRC, LLC, a company owned by the principals of De Pere, Wisconsin-based Smet Construction Services. The sale closed the week of June 23, 2009, when the station's call sign was changed from WMQF to WZMQ. By this time, however, WMQF programming was discontinued as Equity was not able to meet the mandatory digital transition earlier in June 2009. As a result, Fox would move its affiliation from channel 19 to WLUC-DT2 (channel 6.2) in August 2009, which maintained its previous Universal Sports affiliation in overnights until it was able to establish a full schedule. During the interim, Fox programming was still available on Charter through its importing of WLUK-TV from Green Bay (which continued on Charter throughout WMQF's existence until WLUC asserted market exclusivity for the Fox affiliate in mid-2012).

Logo during MMRC ownership (2010–2018).

Smet Construction Services constructed new facilities in De Pere, Wisconsin, from which WZMQ programming would originate. The construction was completed on or about October 15, 2009, after which Smet officially launched WZMQ, replacing the "Coming Soon" slides that had been broadcast since the summer with programming from This TV and MyNetworkTV on channels 19.1 and 19.2 respectively. The studio in De Pere was abandoned and all operations moved to Marquette. Antenna TV would be added to channel 19.2 on January 1, 2011, with MyNetworkTV moving to channel 19.1, replacing This TV's weeknight movie broadcast.

In May 2011, WZMQ picked up the MeTV subchannel, placing it at 19.1; its other subchannels each were renumbered accordingly, with This TV and MyNetworkTV moving to channel 19.2 and Antenna TV moving to 19.3. Over time, as the revenue of MeTV increased and MyNetworkTV declined, WZMQ decreased the branding of 19.2 as "My 19", choosing to stick with "MeTV Marquette" for the majority of the day and promoting the MyNetworkTV schedule less often. By 2017, it carried the service mostly unbranded, secondarily to the subchannel's primary This TV affiliation.

On October 10, 2017, MMMRC agreed to sell WZMQ to a company controlled by Brian and Kevin Lilly, the owners of Lilly Broadcasting, for $103,475. The new owners began operating the station through a local marketing agreement the following day.

Lilly soon instituted several programming changes on the station, including local weather forecast segments provided by the meteorology staff at Lilly's WICU-TV/WSEE-TV in Erie, Pennsylvania, which already provides weather forecasts to their stations in the Caribbean region. The This TV affiliation also ended in 2019, with Start TV moving to the second subchannel, and its fourth subchannel affiliating with Ion Television.

== WZMQ-DT2 ==
On January 20, 2022, WJMN informed its viewers that it had lost the CBS affiliation effective the next day, with MyNetworkTV and Antenna TV programming replacing CBS network programs and the 11 p.m. late news moving to an hour at 10 p.m. The second digital subchannel of WZMQ became the new home of CBS programming in Marquette. The Start TV affiliation on DT2 moved to DT5, while the Ion Television affiliation also moved to a newly created DT7 subchannel. Concurrent with the relaunch of WZMQ-DT2 as a CBS affiliate, its over-the-air feed was upgraded to 1080i full HD (per more bandwidth being distributed into that subchannel and away from the remaining subchannels) as, meanwhile, the remaining subchannels continue to be presented in 480i widescreen standard definition.

== Newscasts ==
Upon acquiring the CBS affiliation for its DT2 subchannel, Lilly Broadcasting announced that the subchannel would start airing weekday newscasts, branded 19 News, This is Home, at 6 p.m. and 11 p.m. The newscasts are anchored locally with reporters based in Marquette. In mid-June 2022, Lilly announced that it purchased a building across from the Delft Theater on West Washington Street in downtown Marquette and construct a studio and offices in the second floor space to accommodate more local anchors, reporters, and a meteorological team.

== Technical information ==
=== Subchannels ===
The station's digital signal is multiplexed:

Subchannels of WZMQ
Subchannel	Res.	Short name	Programming
19.1	480i	ME TV	MeTV
19.2	1080i	CBS	CBS
19.3	480i	H I	Heroes & Icons
19.4	480i	CourtTV	Court TV
19.5	480i	START	Start TV
19.7	480i	ION-TV	Ion

=== Analog-to-digital conversion ===
WZMQ shut down its analog signal, over UHF channel 19, on June 12, 2009, the official date on which full-power television stations in the United States transitioned from analog to digital broadcasts under federal mandate. The station "flash-cut" its digital signal into operation on UHF channel 19; as it had been granted its original construction permit after the Federal Communications Commission finalized the digital television allotment plan on April 21, 1997, WMQF did not receive a companion channel for a digital station. Since the channel was then owned by Equity Media Holdings, the company told the FCC it was not able to convert WMQF and most of its stations to digital in time for the transition. After being sold to MMMRC, WZMQ made its flash-cut to digital shortly before the June 2009 transition cutoff, transmitting two subchannels that were at low-power due to Equity-era transmitter neglect.
