= WKSN =

Radio station in Jamestown, New York

- Jamestown, New York; United States
- Frequency: 1340 kHz
- Branding: WKSN Legends

Programming
- Format: Adult standards
- Affiliations: Cleveland Guardians Radio Network; Erie Otters

Ownership
- Owner: Lilly Broadcasting; (Glenora Radio Network LLC)
- Sister stations: WHUG, WJTN, WKZA, WQFX-FM, WWSE

History
- First air date: February 26, 1948
- Former call signs: WJOC (1948–1961); WXYJ (1961–1963)
- Call sign meaning: Kissin' (previous formats)

Technical information
- Licensing authority: FCC
- Facility ID: 65592
- Class: C
- Power: 260 watts (day); 520 watts (night)
- Transmitter coordinates: 42°6′17″N 79°15′27″W

Links
- Public license information: Public file; LMS
- Webcast: Listen live
- Website: wksn.com/on-air/wksn-am

WKSN (1340 AM) is a commercial adult standards radio station licensed to Jamestown, New York, United States. Owned by Lilly Broadcasting, the station serves as a local affiliate for the Cleveland Guardians Radio Network.

Since the mid-2010s, WKSN has had no disc jockeys except during syndicated programs, and has run a locally-programed, primarily automated library. It currently features adult standards music from the 1940s - 1970s.

Intelligence For Your Life with John Tesh currently airs during the day. Local news and community information is featured often as well.

== History ==
AM 1340 signed on in 1948 as WJOC. It was one of two new Western New York stations to sign on following the move of Buffalo station WEBR from the 1340 frequency to AM 970 (now WDCZ) that year; the other was Lockport's then-WUSJ (now WLVL). What is now WKSN used the call sign WXYJ in the mid-1960s before adopting the WKSN call sign and "Kissin'" slogan by no later than 1968. For most of its early history, WKSN played a Top 40 format using the "Good Guys" slogan. A television sister station, WNYP (channel 26), signed on in 1966, when both stations were owned by Bud Paxson; channel 26 shut down after three years and its license is now being used by a religious station. During the 1990s and early 2000s, WKSN (Kissin' Oldies) was an oldies outlet carrying a local morning show and a midday show by Paul Hoefler (now performing commercial jingles in the area), as well the satellite Good Time Oldies from Jones Radio Networks until the station was bought out by Media One Group, LLC in 2003.

Soon after Media One's purchase, WKSN began being used as a counterprogramming station to the other AM radio station in Jamestown, WJTN, also owned by Media One Group. From approximately 2004 until the summer of 2008, the station ran with shows such as Rush Limbaugh (counterprogrammed to a liberal program known as The Hall Closet on WJTN), Imus in the Morning, Bill Bennett, Dr. Dean Edell and Glenn Beck, as well as affiliations with Talk Radio Network and FOX Sports Radio. On July 4, 2008, WKSN switched back to the oldies format. With the change to oldies (and The Hall Closet's discontinuation), Edell, Beck and Ed Schultz were moved to sister station WJTN (Schultz actually began airing on WJTN on June 23, 2008 in Ray Hall's time slot, so both WJTN and WKSN were airing Schultz from June 23 to July 3, 2008), while Rush Limbaugh was dropped from the market altogether (after a brief stint on rival station WLKW-FM, the show again was absent from the southwestern New York airwaves until Limbaugh's death). Not long afterward, WJTN also changed to a music format, extending its adult standards/MOR format (at the time only played on Jim Roselle's show) throughout the day.

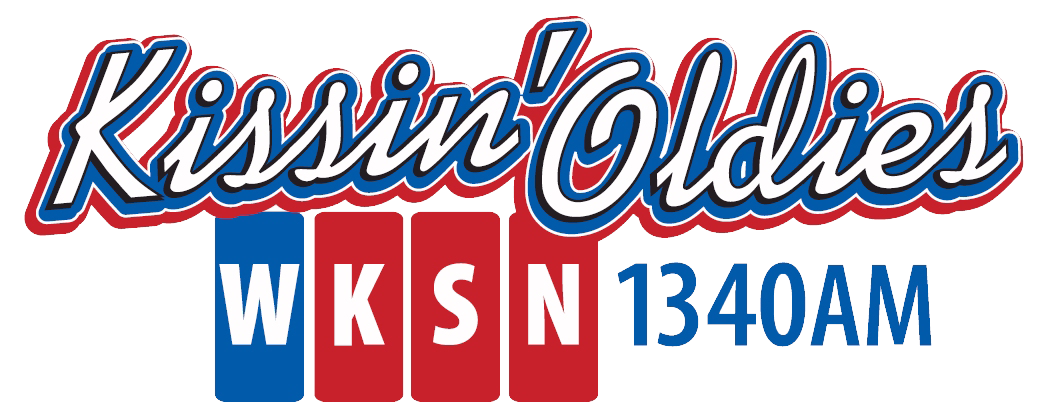
WKSN's 2008–23 logo as Kissin' Oldies, now on WKZA.

WKSN was an affiliate of Scott Shannon's True Oldies Channel until that station ceased terrestrial distribution in June 2014. It then began airing Westwood One's brand new Good Time Oldies format, shortly after the latter's merger with Dial Global. A few years later, they dropped the syndicated program in favor of a broader locally-programed playlist. At first, some of the Media One Group DJs talked between songs, but the station eventually became mostly automated.

WKSN was an affiliate of NFL on Westwood One then moved to sister station WJTN; for many years, it was the radio home of the Jamestown Jammers (Jammers broadcasts were dropped from WKSN several years before the team left Jamestown; its successors, the Tarp Skunks, air instead on WRFA).

WKSN began streaming its programming on the Internet in November 2019.

In September 2022, the Erie Otters announced a radio broadcast partnership with WKSN beginning in the 2022-2023 OHL season.

On July 1, 2023, the "Kissin' Oldies" format on WKSN moved to FM 106.9 WKZA, also historically known as "KISS FM." In its place, WKSN began airing an adult standards format previously heard on sister station WJTN. Despite the brands changing frequencies, the WKSN and WKZA call signs stayed on their respective frequencies.

Lilly Broadcasting, owner of WICU-TV and operator of WSEE-TV in Erie, Pennsylvania, acquired Media One's radio stations in Ashtabula and Jamestown, New York, in December 2025 for a combined $4 million.
