= WWSE =

Radio station in Jamestown, New York

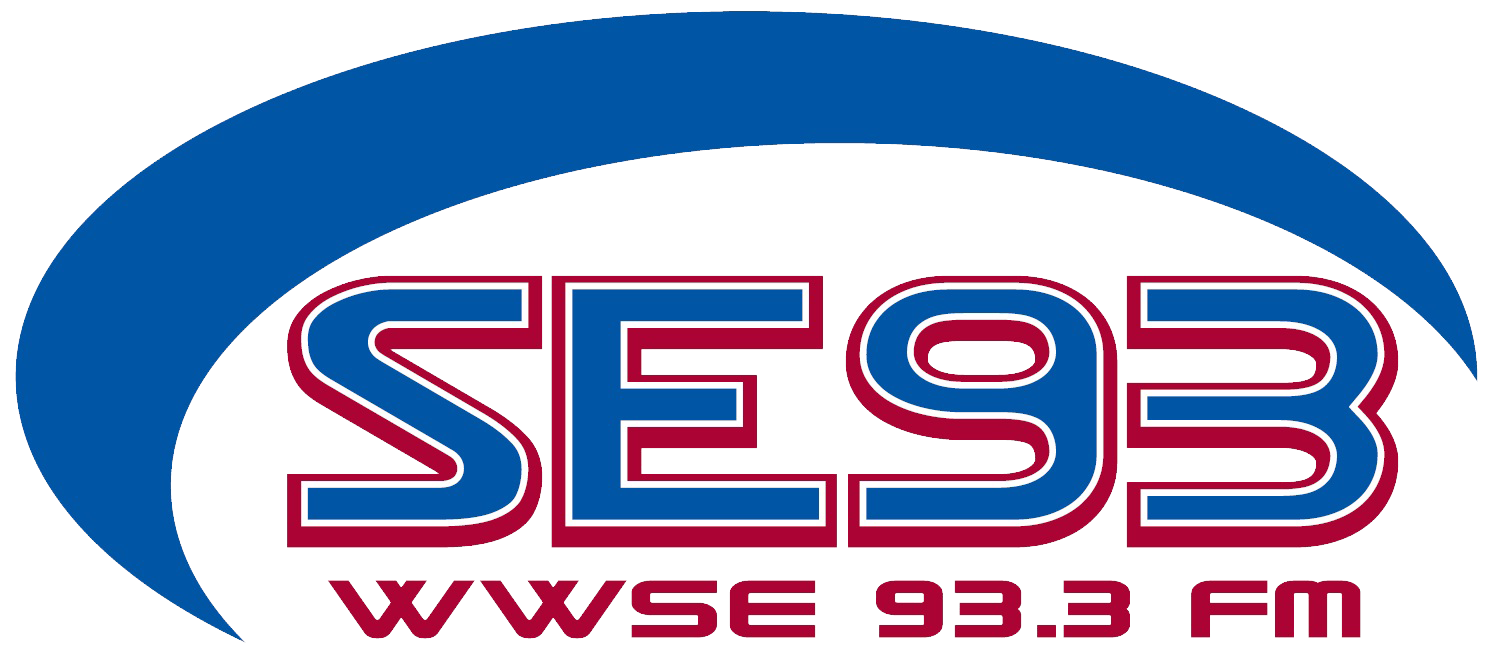
- Jamestown, New York; United States
- Frequency: 93.3 MHz
- Branding: SE 93

Programming
- Format: Hot adult contemporary
- Affiliations: Compass Media Networks; Premiere Networks; Buffalo Bills Radio Network

Ownership
- Owner: Lilly Broadcasting; (Glenora Radio Network LLC)
- Sister stations: WHUG, WJTN, WKSN, WKZA, WQFX-FM

History
- First air date: October 1947
- Call sign meaning: "Wonderful World of Stereo Entertainment"

Technical information
- Licensing authority: FCC
- Facility ID: 29919
- Class: B
- ERP: 26,500 watts
- HAAT: 196 meters (643 ft)
- Transmitter coordinates: 42°05′06″N 79°17′23″W

Links
- Public license information: Public file; LMS
- Webcast: Listen live
- Website: se933.com

WWSE (93.3 FM) is a commercial radio station licensed to Jamestown, New York, United States. Owned by Lilly Broadcasting, the station broadcasts a hot adult contemporary format branded "SE 93". WWSE is also an affiliate of the Buffalo Bills Radio Network.

== History ==
In October 1947, the station first signed on the air. It was the FM counterpart to sister station WJTN 1240 AM. It originally simulcast most of WJTN's programming. In the late 1970s, it began broadcasting its own separate contemporary hits format.

The station hosted the popular Chautauqua Lake Idol for 11 years in Bemus Point, attracting thousands of spectators to The Floating Stage on Monday nights during the summer.

Lilly Broadcasting, owner of WICU-TV and operator of WSEE-TV in Erie, Pennsylvania, acquired Media One's radio stations in Ashtabula and Jamestown, New York, in December 2025 for a combined $4 million.

== Programming ==
Local personalities heard on the station include Lee John and Andrew Hill.
