= WRRN =

Radio station in Warren, Pennsylvania

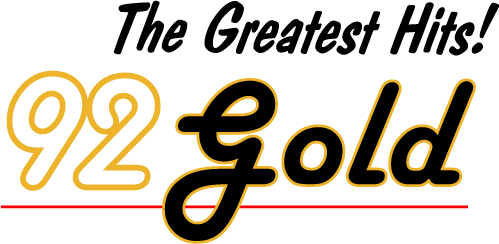
- Warren, Pennsylvania; United States
- Broadcast area: Jamestown, New York
- Frequency: 92.3 MHz
- Branding: 92 Gold

Programming
- Format: Classic hits
- Affiliations: Local Radio Networks

Ownership
- Owner: Lilly Broadcasting; (Lilly Broadcasting of Pennsylvania LLC)
- Sister stations: WICU, WNAE

History
- First air date: April 22, 1948
- Former call signs: WNAE-FM (1948–1951)
- Former frequencies: 92.1 MHz (1948–1951)
- Call sign meaning: Warren, Pennsylvania (city of license)

Technical information
- Licensing authority: FCC
- Facility ID: 34927
- Class: B
- ERP: 50,000 watts
- HAAT: 125 meters (410 ft)
- Transmitter coordinates: 41°48′50.00″N 79°10′4.00″W

Links
- Public license information: Public file; LMS
- Webcast: Listen live
- Website: warrenradio.com/station/92-gold

WRRN (92.3 FM) is a radio station broadcasting a classic hits format. Licensed to Warren, Pennsylvania, United States, the station is currently owned by Lilly Broadcasting and is an affiliate of Local Radio Networks' "Classic Hits 2" format.

An audio feed of this station currently broadcasts on channel 11, a community bulletin board, on one of the local cable providers.

== History ==
WRRN signed on the air April 22, 1948, as WNAE-FM on 92.1 MHz. The station was started by the Northern Allegheny Broadcasting Company, under the ownership of president and general manager David Potter. It was the sister station of WNAE, an AM station that had signed on after World War II had ended, and the Federal Communications Commission (FCC) began to issue licenses to radio stations. The licensing process had been halted once the U.S. had entered the war. W. LeRoy Schneck was program director and would one day assume control of both stations.

WNAE-FM first signed on the air with an effective radiated power of 3,000 watts. In 1951, it changed its call letters to WRRN and moved to 92.3. By the 1970s, the station would increase its power to 26,000 watts and then to 50,000 by the 1980s. The station would periodically simulcast with WNAE at varying times, as WNAE was a daytime-only station until the late 1980s.

Outside of the simulcast in the early 1970's, the station utilized a locally-programmed progressive rock format, under the direction of Scott Saylor, "Mr. FM Rock." Billboard even referred to it as "one of the nation's leading progressive stations."

In 1974, WNAE and WRRN were sold by Northern Allegheny Broadcasting to Kinzua Broadcasting Company, a company formed by longtime program director W. LeRoy Schneck, who now served as company president and station General Manager. Dave Whipple assumed Schneck's programming duties.

Following its progressive rock stint, WRRN became a beautiful music radio station branded as "Easy 92.3". Like many other such formatted radio stations, WRRN played 10-inch reel-to-reel music tapes, provided by Bonneville Broadcasting, from an automation playback system, with the occasional news brief from AP Network News and/or UPI Radio News, and local news from WNAE's newsroom.

While operating as an easy listening station, WRRN simulcast WNAE's morning show from 6 to 9 am Monday through Friday. Though music formats at times varied for WNAE over the years, music played during the simulcast was more soft rock-oriented to better buffer the easy listening format once the simulcast had ended for the day.

In 1999, WRRN changed its format to soft adult contemporary, known as "Today's 92." Then, in 2002, the station changed its format to oldies, branded as "92 Gold", which then transitioned to classic hits in August of 2014.

On September 30, 2005, Kibco Radio sold WRRN and its two sister stations to Radio Partners, LLC, which owned WBVP and WMBA in Beaver Falls and Ambridge, Pennsylvania, respectively. Radio Partners LLC President Frank Iorio retained W. LeRoy Schneck as general manager for a period to assist with the transfer of ownership.

In the mid-2000's, it began airing Jones Radio Networks 24-hour satellite Good Time Oldies format, which eventually became known as Kool Gold from Dial Global, following a merger of the two companies. In 2014, Dial Global merged with Westwood One, and the format would become subsequently become known as Classic Hits Total.

Despite the syndicated programming, the station remained heavily involved in the local community. It included a live and local morning show from 6-10am on weekdays, as well as other local programming and remote broadcasts. 40+ year WNAE/WRRN personality, Mark Silvis, retired from the station in August of 2020.

In 2019, after a failed attempt to sell the stations to Laurel Media two years prior, Radio Partners, LLC, sold WRRN, along with its sister stations WKNB and WNAE, to Lilly Broadcasting, which operates WICU-TV and WSEE-TV in Erie, Pennsylvania, for $900,000.

In September 2020, the station dropped affiliation with Westwood One, in favor of the more flexible syndicated classic hits format from Local Radio Networks, allowing them to frequently insert local news. The format plays a variety of music spanning from the 1960s thru early 2000s.

On November 24, 2025, WRRN flipped to an all-Christmas format, also provided by Local Radio Networks, which continued until midnight on December 26th.

On July 27th, 2026, WRRN started broadcasting reports from NBC News Radio following the shutdown of CBS News Radio in May 2026
