= WEHP =

WEHP may refer to:

- WEHP (FM), a radio station (93.7 FM) licensed to serve Clinton, Indiana, United States
- WICU-FM, a radio station (92.7 FM) licensed to serve Lawrence Park, Pennsylvania, United States, which held the call sign WEHP from 2012 to 2019
