= WKZA =

Radio station in Lakewood, New York

- Lakewood, New York; United States
- Broadcast area: Jamestown, New York
- Frequency: 106.9 MHz
- Branding: Kissin Oldies 106.9

Programming
- Format: Oldies
- Affiliations: Premiere Networks

Ownership
- Owner: Lilly Broadcasting; (Glenora Radio Network LLC)
- Sister stations: WHUG, WJTN, WKSN, WQFX-FM, WWSE

History
- First air date: September 5, 2000
- Former call signs: WKSQ-FM (2000)
- Call sign meaning: Kinzua

Technical information
- Licensing authority: FCC
- Facility ID: 48736
- Class: B1
- ERP: 5,100 watts
- HAAT: 225 meters (738 ft)
- Transmitter coordinates: 41°57′31″N 79°16′11″W

Links
- Public license information: Public file; LMS
- Webcast: Listen live
- Website: mediaonegroupradio.com/on-air/wkza-106-9-fm

WKZA (106.9 FM) is a radio station broadcasting an oldies format, and annually switches to all-Christmas the day after Thanksgiving. Licensed to Lakewood, New York, United States, the station serves the Jamestown, New York area. The station is currently owned by Lilly Broadcasting.

== History ==
The station originally intended to sign on as WKSQ-FM, as FCC records dated September 5, 2000 indicate. On October 9, 2000, the station changed its call sign to the current WKZA, the call sign made popular by a now-defunct AM station in nearby Kane, Pennsylvania. However, the station did not sign on until late November 2000.

The station's first format was a stunt, airing continuous Christmas music. Soon after, the station "officially" signed on with its format of KISS-FM hit radio, which it maintained for the next 23 years.

As an independently owned station, WKZA sometimes leaned toward hot adult contemporary, thus overlapping and competing against WWSE, the established adult-contemporary station in Jamestown. MediaOne Group, owners of WWSE, purchased WKZA from its owners Cross Country Communications in August 2018, closing on its deal October 31 of that year. With the change, each station received a clear focus: WKZA would serve as a pure top-40 outlet, WWSE would stay with hot adult contemporary, while gold-based soft adult contemporary would move to AM/FM outlet WJTN. WKZA temporary morning host Kyle Lewis was retained in the purchase, moving to afternoons, and Andrew Hill and Noel Blackhall began doing the morning show separate from their afternoon program on sister station WWSE.

On July 1, 2023, as part of a realignment among Media One's stations, the programming that had previously been heard on sister station WKSN (which had coincidentally been branded as "Kissin' Oldies" since before WKZA signed on), but not the WKSN call sign, moved to WKZA, thus flipping 106.9 to oldies. WKZA's existing programming was merged onto WWSE, with the company noting in a statement that hot adult contemporary and contemporary hit radio were experiencing major overlap at the time, and thus WKZA and WWSE were essentially still directly competing against each other until the change.

Lilly Broadcasting, owner of WICU-TV and operator of WSEE-TV in Erie, Pennsylvania, acquired Media One's radio stations in Ashtabula and Jamestown, New York, in December 2025 for a combined $4 million.

Its current oldies format features a wide, locally programmed, playlist of songs from the 1960s and 70s, with the occasional track from the late 50s and early 80s. The slogan "60s, 70s, and more" is often used in station liners.

The voicetracked Ashley and Brad show airs Monday-Saturday mornings. Other national programming heard on the station includes That Thing with Rich Appel, Rockin' the Decades with Tony Orlando, Cousin Brucie's Rock & Roll Party, WABC's Vinnie Medugno Show, Live from the '60s (with Don Steele and M.G. Kelly), and Joe Johnson's Beatle Brunch.

Logo used from 2018 to 2023
