= WENY-TV =

Television station in Elmira, New York

- Elmira–Corning–Ithaca, New York; United States
- City: Elmira, New York
- Channels: Digital: 35 (UHF); Virtual: 36
- Branding: WENY ABC; WENY CBS (36.2)

Programming
- Affiliations: 36.1: ABC; 36.2: CBS; 36.3: Independent; 36.4: Ion

Ownership
- Owner: Lilly Broadcasting, L.L.C.

History
- First air date: November 19, 1969
- Former channel numbers: Analog: 36 (UHF, 1969–2009); Digital: 55 (UHF, 2000–2009), 36 (UHF, 2009–2019)
- Former affiliations: The CW Plus (36.3, 2009-2025)
- Call sign meaning: Elmira, New York

Technical information
- Licensing authority: FCC
- Facility ID: 71508
- ERP: 145 kW
- HAAT: 311 m (1,020 ft)
- Transmitter coordinates: 42°8′31.2″N 77°4′38.8″W
- Translator(s): WCVI-TV 23.1 Christiansted, USVI; W34FR-D Ithaca

Links
- Public license information: Public file; LMS
- Website: www.weny.com

WENY-TV (channel 36) is a television station in Elmira, New York, United States, affiliated with ABC and CBS. Owned by Lilly Broadcasting, the station has studios on Old Ithaca Road in Horseheads, and its transmitter is located on Higman Hill in Corning.

== History ==
The station signed on November 19, 1969, after Howard Green, owner of WENY radio (1230 AM, now WMAJ and 92.7 FM, now WCBF) and WCMC-AM-TV in Wildwood, New Jersey, was awarded analog UHF channel 36 by the Federal Communications Commission (FCC). Another area broadcaster, Frank Saia, had surrendered the construction permit to build what would have been WEHH-TV on the same channel.

Green purchased the initial equipment from defunct station WNYP-TV, hiring Larry Taylor (previously the Assistant Chief Engineer of WNYP-TV) to move and install the broadcast equipment. Green and Taylor brought the equipment into a space on the ground floor of the Mark Twain Hotel in Downtown Elmira which had been a restaurant. The station's analog antenna was side-mounted to the Hawley Hill tower of NBC affiliate WSYE-TV (now known as WETM-TV). A further addition was constructed to the building that housed WSYE to allow for the installation of the WENY analog transmitter. The station's digital transmitter was relocated to Corning.

WENY began operations out of a mixed color/black-and-white facility. Its broadcasts of ABC network programming were actually retransmissions of either WABC-TV in New York City or WNYS-TV (now WSYR-TV) in Syracuse, New York. The former was received via microwave while the latter was received via a deep fringe hotel rooftop antenna. The station aired a small amount of locally produced programming including an Elmira edition of Claster Television's long-running children's program Romper Room and a late-Saturday night horror movie hosted by disc jockey Paul Leigh as the ghoulish "Undertaker".

During the disastrous flooding caused by Hurricane Agnes in 1972, WENY was abandoned due to rising waters. Engineers were able to remove a small amount of equipment to the Hawley Hill site where the station managed a limited broadcasting schedule of news and emergency announcements until the studios could be reoccupied. After this, Green obtained a building on Old Ithaca Road in Horseheads that had been used by the Army Corps of Engineers. In 1973, Taylor, along with engineer Gary Simon, moved the station from the hotel to the garage of the property where it remains to this day. In 2000, longtime owner Howard Green sold WENY to current owner Lilly Broadcasting (owned by Brian Lilly, son of SJL Broadcasting's George Lilly) thus separating the television station from its radio sisters which were sold to Eolin (Olin) Broadcasting.

According to the FCC, it had an application to air a digital signal on UHF channel 55. However, the station opted to perform a flash-cut instead. Qualcomm holds licenses for the channel 55 spectrum. Approval of WENY's request to flash-cut allowed that company's wholly owned subsidiary, MediaFLO United States, to expand its "mediacast" service coverage in New York State without loss of broadcast service to the public. WENY's digital transmitter was relocated to Corning. The station's coverage area includes Steuben and Chemung counties in New York which borders the Erie, Pennsylvania, market and sister stations WSEE-TV and WICU-TV.

In July 2014, WENY became the subject of criticism when it cut away from the closing minutes of the 2014 FIFA World Cup Final to broadcast coverage of a tornado warning affecting the area.

== Subchannel history ==
=== WENY-DT2 ===
WENY-DT2 is the CBS-affiliated second digital subchannel of WENY-TV, broadcasting in 1080i high definition on channel 36.2.

On October 20, 2008, CBS signed an affiliation agreement with WENY to air the network on a new second digital subchannel with a proposed launch date of January 1, 2009. This marked the first time that CBS had an affiliate based in Elmira. Before then, most of the area had been served by longtime default affiliate WBNG-TV in Binghamton while the Ithaca area was served by Syracuse affiliate WTVH. The western portions of the area, including Canisteo and Hornell, were covered by Buffalo's WIVB-TV, while Scranton–Wilkes-Barre affiliate WYOU and Johnstown affiliate WTAJ-TV served portions of the Pennsylvania market. According to the FCC, WENY had a request to flash-cut from analog to digital broadcasting after the old transition date of February 17, 2009. On that date, WENY-DT2 launched on Time Warner Cable systems in Elmira, Corning, Hornell, and Ithaca.

The flash-cut was performed at the end of May, and WENY began broadcasting exclusively in digital. The new CBS station began its transmission over-the-air at this point; WBNG, WIVB, and WTVH were dropped from cable systems at that time due to FCC rules, except for WTVH which remains in Ithaca on cable. Until recently, the shows on this CBS subchannel were only transmitted in 16:9 standard definition widescreen; a full HD feed of the CBS station could only be seen on Time Warner Cable (now Charter Spectrum).

== News operation ==
The WENY-TV news opening with logo in 1990.

At first, the station's only local programming were newscasts seen weeknights at 6 and 11 pm. The original anchor team featured news director Bill Miller, long-time WENY disc jockey Steve Christy with weather, and sports by Dick Ireland. Christy, the last of the three to retire, remained with the station until early 2009 at which point he retired due to health problems. Also known as "Mr. WENY" in reference to his long tenure at the station, he died in July 2010. In 1975, WENY became the first television outlet in the market to switch from 16mm black-and-white reversal news footage to color electronic news gathering using the Sony U-Matic system. In 1977, it became the first in Elmira to use an electronic character generator during newscasts.

Rival WETM has traditionally been a ratings stronghold in the Twin Tiers area. This is because the news department at WENY is quite small compared with the NBC outlet and most other big three affiliates. Another traditional news time slot currently lacking a program on WENY's channels includes a newscast weeknights at 5 p.m.

Weeknights at 6 and 11 pm, the ABC and CBS subchannels simulcast local news although there can sometimes be a delay or preemption on one service due to network obligations. WENY upgraded its newscast to full high definition (studio, and field reports) on April 23, 2012, making it the first to do so in the Elmira–Corning market. WENY shares resources with sister stations WSEE and WICU in Erie to cover the Western Twin Tiers region.

== Technical information ==
=== Subchannels ===
The station's signal is multiplexed:

Subchannels of WENY-TV
Subchannel	Res.	Short name	Programming
36.1	720p	WNY ABC	ABC
36.2	1080i	WNY CBS	CBS
36.3	480i	WNY CW	Independent
36.4	480i	WNY ION	Ion

=== Analog-to-digital conversion ===
WENY-TV shut down its analog signal, over UHF channel 36, on February 17, 2009, the original target date by which full-power television stations in the United States were to transition from analog to digital broadcasts under federal mandate (which was later pushed back to June 12, 2009). The station's digital signal relocated from its pre-transition UHF channel 55, which was among the high band UHF channels (52-69) that were removed from broadcasting use as a result of the transition, to its analog era UHF channel 36.

=== Translators ===
WENY-TV is relayed on repeater W34FR-D in Ithaca (in the Syracuse market).

WENY-TV was previously aired on repeater W06AR on VHF channel 6 in Hornell.

== Out-of-market coverage ==
In January 2016, Lilly Broadcasting began to offer WENY as an ABC affiliate for the Caribbean island region which was picked up by local cable providers as a replacement for Christiansted, U.S. Virgin Islands–based station WSVI, which lost its ABC affiliation at the end of 2015 due to technical issues and switched to Ion. Lilly already provides sister station WSEE as a CBS affiliate for the region, along with customized weather forecasts carried on a second local feed for the region. Lilly formerly leased the second subchannel of WCVI-TV (channel 23) locally to provide WENY over-the-air for the region; it purchased the station outright on November 19, 2019, and added the modified WSEE feed to the station's main subchannel on November 20.

WENY was previously viewable on cable in Ithaca until Nexstar Media Group, which owns rival station WETM-TV, ordered Charter Spectrum to drop the channel because the city is supposed to be in the Syracuse market and WENY was thus depriving Nexstar-owned Syracuse ABC affiliate WSYR-TV of clearance. To circumvent this, in November 2018, Charter Spectrum struck an agreement with WENY to create NY Local Ithaca, a custom cable feed that contains WENY newscasts and a weather loop with no network or syndicated programming. This feed is simulcast nationally on VUit (now Zeam), a newscast streaming service owned by Syncbak.

== See also ==
- Channel 35 digital TV stations in the United States
- Channel 36 virtual TV stations in the United States
