= CBS 23 =

CBS 23 may refer to one of the following television stations in the United States:

== Current ==
- KVEO-DT2, a digital channel of KVEO-TV in Brownsville, Texas
- WCVI-DT2, a digital channel of WCVI-TV in Christiansted, U.S. Virgin Islands
- WIFR-LD in Rockford, Illinois

== Former ==
- KERO-TV in Bakersfield, California (1984 to 1996)
