= WICU (AM) =

Radio station in Warren, Pennsylvania

Simulcast of WICU-FM, Lawrence Park–Erie
- Warren, Pennsylvania; United States
- Broadcast area: Jamestown, New York
- Frequency: 1310 kHz
- Branding: Happi Radio

Programming
- Format: Contemporary hit radio

Ownership
- Owner: Lilly Broadcasting; (Lilly Broadcasting of Pennsylvania LLC)
- Sister stations: WRRN; WNAE

History
- First air date: December 31, 1946; 79 years ago
- Former call signs: WNAE (1946–2020)
- Call sign meaning: derived from sister station WICU-TV

Technical information
- Licensing authority: FCC
- Facility ID: 34928
- Class: D
- Power: 5,000 watts (day); 94 watts (night)
- Transmitter coordinates: 41°48′50.2″N 79°10′3.2″W
- Translator: 96.7 W244DY (Warren)

Links
- Public license information: Public file; LMS
- Webcast: Listen live
- Website: www.happi927.com

WICU (1310 AM; "Happi Radio") is a radio station broadcasting a contemporary hit radio format. Licensed to Warren, Pennsylvania, United States, the station is a simulcast of Erie-based WICU-FM (92.7); its programming is also heard on translator station W244DY (96.7 FM). WICU is owned by Lilly Broadcasting.

== History ==
The station signed on December 31, 1946, as WNAE. Northern Allegheny Broadcasting sold the station to Kinzua Broadcasting Company in 1974.

Owner, president and general manager, W. LeRoy Schneck, remained part of the company since its beginnings, and was awarded "Man of the Century" by the local Chamber of Commerce in 2000. He continued to host a big-band program well into the 2000s.

The station was a long time local fixture, airing a contemporary music format, with a strong focus on local news and community information, as well as broadcasting local and national sports. Sales manager Dave Whipple was well-known as the morning host for many years, and Bob Seiden was the longtime news director.

It switched to a mostly syndicated talk format in the late 2000s, and eventually began simulcasting on 96.7 (W244DY), and changed its branding to "News/Talk 96.7".

During this era, another longtime personality, Mark Silvis, hosted a talk show on Sunday mornings, in which he interviewed local members of the community about upcoming events. The program, which was broadcast until 2020, was known as Insight with Mark Silvis.

Kinzua Broadcasting sold WNAE, along with sister stations WRRN and WKNB, to Frank Iorio, who already owned the construction permit for a station on 102.7 FM in Clarendon, in 2005 for $1.25 million. In 2019, after a failed attempt to sell the stations to Laurel Media two years prior, Iorio (who owned the stations under the name Radio Partners LLC) sold WNAE, WKNB, and WRRN, to Lilly Broadcasting, which operates WICU-TV and WSEE-TV in Erie, Pennsylvania, for $900,000.

The station's call sign was changed to WICU on March 4, 2020, matching WICU-TV and WICU-FM in Erie; the change was a prelude to the replacement of WNAE's former talk radio format with a simulcast of WICU-FM's contemporary hit radio programming on April 1. The WNAE call sign was concurrently transferred one of its sister stations, the former WKNB.

On August 31, 2026, it was announced that the simulcast of WICU-FM on 1310 and 96.7 is set to end on October 1, when the two stations will begin broadcasting a sports talk format.
