= WBCT (disambiguation) =

WBCT is a country music radio station licensed to Grand Rapids, Michigan.

WBCT may also refer to:

- WZME, a television station in Bridgeport, Connecticut that formerly used the same call sign
- WFHW-LP, a defunct low-power television station in Buffalo, New York that used the same letters informally as on-air branding
- Wilts & Berks Canal Trust, a canal restoration society in Wiltshire, England
