= WVXF =

Television station in Charlotte Amalie, U.S. Virgin Islands

WVXF and WSJP-LD

WVXF: Charlotte Amalie, U.S. Virgin Islands; WSJP-LD: Aguadilla–Mayagüez, Puerto Rico
- Channels for WVXF: Digital: 17 (UHF); Virtual: 17
- Channels for WSJP-LD: Digital: 26 (UHF); Virtual: 26
- Branding: Cozi TV Caribbean; Fox U.S. Virgin Islands (WVXF); Fox Puerto Rico (WSJP-LD)

Programming
- Affiliations: 17.1/26.1: Cozi TV; 17.2/26.2: Fox; for others, see § Subchannels

Ownership
- Owner: Lilly Broadcasting; (Lilly Broadcasting Ventures, LLC/Condado Broadcasting, LLC)
- Sister stations: WCVI-TV, WVGN-LD

History
- Founded: WVXF: September 14, 1992; WSJP-LD: April 16, 2002
- First air date: WVXF: July 1, 1999; WSJP-LD: April 18, 2005
- Former call signs: WSJP-LD: W30CA (2002–2004); WSJP-LP (2004–2012)
- Former channel number: WVXF: Analog: 17 (UHF, 1999–2009); WSJP-LD: Analog: 30 (UHF, 2002–2012); Digital: 18 (UHF, 2012–2018), 14 (UHF, 2018–2025); Virtual: 30 (2019–2025)
- Former affiliations: WVXF: CBS (1999–2009); This TV (2009–2011, 2014–2024); Live Well Network (2011–2014); WSJP-LD: UPN/The WB (2005–2006); The CW (2006–2014, 2015–2016); LATV (secondary, 2007–2014); ABC (2014–2015); Cozi TV (secondary 2015–2025, now on LD2); Fox (LD2 2015–2025, now on LD1 until 202?); The CW (LD3, 2014–2015)
- Call sign meaning: WVXF: Virgin Islands Fox (transposed, as a backronym); WSJP-LD: San Juan, Puerto Rico

Technical information
- Licensing authority: FCC
- Facility ID: WVXF: 3113; WSJP-LD: 127507
- Class: WSJP-LD: LD
- ERP: WVXF: 4.2 kW; WSJP-LD: 10 kW
- HAAT: WVXF: 454 m (1,490 ft); WSJP-LD: 328.7 m (1,078 ft)
- Transmitter coordinates: WVXF: 18°21′19″N 64°56′49″W; WSJP-LD: 18°18′45.8″N 67°10′56″W

Links
- Public license information: WVXF: Public file; LMS; WSJP-LD: Public file; LMS
- Website: www.wvxftv.com; www.foxtvusvi.com

WVXF (channel 17) is a television station in Charlotte Amalie, Saint Thomas, serving the United States Virgin Islands as an affiliate of Cozi TV and Fox. Owned by Lilly Broadcasting, it is a sister station to low-power NBC affiliate WVGN-LD (channel 19) and dual CBS/ABC affiliate WCVI-TV (channel 23). WVXF's transmitter is located on Signal Hill.

WSJP-LD (channel 26) in Aguadilla, Puerto Rico, operates as a semi-satellite station of WVXF. This station's transmitter is located in Añasco.

WVXF and WSJP broadcast Fox programming in high definition on its second digital subchannel, with Cozi TV on the main channel in standard definition; this is a quirk of the Fox subchannel's former analog home of WEON-LP and WSJX-LP, which had a high definition simulcast placed on WVXF-DT2 and WSJP-LD2 until the stations went dark in order to consolidate Caribbean Broadcasting Network's Virgin Islands operations onto WVXF and WSJP.

Viya Cable carries WVXF-DT2 on channel 6, and WVXF-DT1 on channel 9. WVXF is also available in Puerto Rico on Liberty, and as part of the Puerto Rico locals package on Dish Network.

== History ==
WVXF signed on for the first time on July 1, 1999, as a CBS affiliate. Prior to WVXF's sign-on, CBS programming was seen on Charlotte Amalie's WBNB-TV (channel 10). However, that station went dark permanently following Hurricane Hugo in 1989, when its studios and transmitter facilities were destroyed and the cash-strapped Benedek Broadcasting (owner of several network affiliates in small and mid-sized markets on the mainland) could not afford to rebuild; Benedek retained that station's license until 1995, when it was surrendered on grounds of abandonment. Starting in 1989, CBS service was only available by satellite via network flagship WCBS-TV (from New York) and later Erie, Pennsylvania, affiliate WSEE-TV (which became available on the Primetime 24 package in 1997); the latter is currently carried by most cable and satellite providers in the Caribbean.

Before the launch of The CW, WSJP was a dual affiliate of UPN and The WB. Prior to the station's flash cut to digital, The CW and LATV were WSJP's sole affiliations. Since the switch to Fox in 2014, former sister station WPRU-LP had gone silent, with the American Broadcasting Company affiliations moving to WORA-TV and WRFB.

On July 1, 2009, shortly after the digital television transition, WVXF switched affiliations, from CBS to This TV. Since July 13, CBS programming is available on TV2. In preparation, DirecTV and Dish Network dropped WVXF in favor of WSEE-TV shortly before the affiliation change (the station has since returned to Dish Network).

In January 2010, WVXF rebranded as "EFN Caribbean", adding some syndicated shows and a local fashion-oriented program, Fashion Today, to its This TV programming. The station relaunched once more on May 1, 2011, joining Disney-ABC's Live Well Network as its first primary-channel affiliate, along with giving WEON's Fox feed a high definition home on the second subchannel, which eventually became its sole channel when WEON-LP went dark on December 31, 2011. In late 2014, WVXF-DT1 reverted to This TV, ahead of Live Well ending national distribution in April 2015.

== Subchannels ==
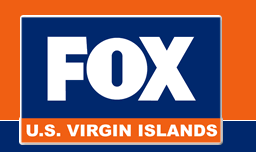
Logo for WVXF-DT2

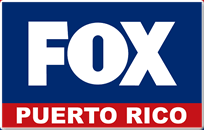
Logo for WSJP-LD2

The station's signal is multiplexed:

Subchannels of WVXF
Channel	Res.	Short name	Programming
17.1	480i		Cozi TV (4:3)
17.2	720p		Fox

Subchannels of WSJP-LD
Channel	Res.	Short name	Programming
26.1	480i		Cozi TV (4:3)
26.2	720p		Fox
26.3	480i		Comet
26.4	480i		Cozi TV
