= WVGN =

WVGN may refer to:

- WVGN-LD, a low-power television station (channel 19) licensed to serve Charlotte Amalie, U.S. Virgin Islands
- WVIE (FM), a radio station (107.3 FM) licensed to serve Charlotte Amalie, U.S. Virgin Islands, which used the call sign WVGN from 2002 until 2015
