= WUPT =

WUPT may refer to:

- WUPT (FM), a radio station (100.3 FM) licensed to Gwinn, Michigan, United States
- WUPT-CA, a defunct television station (channel 25) formerly licensed to Crystal Falls, Michigan, United States
- WUPT-LP, a defunct low-power television translator (channel 43) formerly licensed to Republic, Michigan, United States
