= Roy Speer =

American entrepreneur

Roy Merrill Speer Jr. (June 23, 1932 – August 21, 2012) was an American attorney, and entrepreneur. He was also the former CEO, co-founder and chairman of the Home Shopping Network.

== Early life and education ==
Speer was born in Key West, Florida and graduated from Stetson University in Deland, Florida and from Stetson University College of Law in Gulfport, Florida.

== Career ==
Speer left his job as an assistant state attorney two years after being hired in 1965.

Early in his legal career, Speer worked for the State of Florida in Tallahassee as a Special Assistant Attorney General. He also worked as Assistant Trial Staff Counsel for the U.S. Labor Relations Board. During this period, Speer developed a working relationship with A. Jay Cristol who is now Senior Federal Judge of the Southern Federal Bankruptcy Court. After leaving Tallahassee, he became a chief lobbyist for the City of St. Petersburg, specializing in water rights and laws. Later, Speer was appointed Assistant State Attorney for Pinellas County by Governor Haydon Burns. He then practiced law with John DeVito and Elizabeth A. Kovachevich, who is now a Senior Federal Judge. He dated Elizabeth A. Kovachevich in law school.

Speer established his first of many business partnerships with Estlon and JoAnn Pippin, experienced single-family homebuilders in Pasco County, Florida. They formed Tahitian Homes, Inc. and proceeded to build homes in western Pasco County. Later, Speer expanded his real estate development activities into a large multi-corporation company called Lanbanque, Inc. In order to supply utilities to his ever-expanding real estate projects, Speer and the Pippins established Aloha Utilities, Inc. which was the largest private water and sewer utility in Pasco County. During a slow-down in the real estate business, Speer spent three years in Europe, Saudi Arabia, and Kuwait formulating TACET (Technology and Capital Exchange Trust).

Speer was also involved in growing vegetables in Puerto Rico; he owned a beautician school, restaurants, lounges, a marina, marine dredging, data processing services, multi-level marketing of vitamins and cosmetics, cement block manufacturing, country-western music publishing and recording studios, telecommunications companies, a high-end boutique shop, general insurance agency, internet connection and data center, a walk-in medical clinic, wholesale gasoline and diesel fuel distribution operation, a travel agency, home security monitoring, mail order medical and diabetic supply company, a Big & Tall men's clothing store, an AM radio station, a mobile medical screening company, a book publishing company, a warehouse fulfillment and distribution company, an advertising media consulting firm, television stations, mobile home parks, a 225 room hotel in Nassau, Bahamas, a 500,000 square foot commercial warehouse complex in Las Vegas, and a five-star 23 story resort hotel and residences on Ft. Lauderdale Beach.

In early 1980, Speer formed U.S. Hydrocarbons Drilling and Development, Inc., and oil and gas drilling exploration operation in southeastern Texas. Within a few years the world market price of oil decreased drastically causing the business to fail. There were numerous Texas banks supported by Speer's personal guarantee. The banks forced him into bankruptcy. Over the next four years Speer successfully emerged from bankruptcy with all unpaid claims fully satisfied.

Speer founded the Roy M. Speer Foundation in 1986. The foundation has donated to the Dr. Parker Mahan Facial Pain Center at the University of Florida College of Dentistry, Pasco County YMCA Family Center, The Florida Orchestra, Ronald Reagan Presidential Library, Presidential Prayer Team, Hurricane Relief Fund, New Port Richey's Super Playground, Billy Graham Crusade, and local Christian churches.

=== Home Shopping Network ===
During this tumultuous and intense period of significant litigation when most other business men would have become extremely wary of risky speculations, Speer forged ahead. In 1982, he and Bud Paxson formed Home Shopping Network to sell merchandise on television using a local cable network. This developed as an offshoot of an AM radio program. This became an ideal platform for Speer to apply his years of legal and business expertise. The effort created a completely new industry - retail merchandising through television. When the local venture expanded dramatically, they acquired access on a satellite channel in 1985, enabling the company to sell merchandise throughout the United States from the Clearwater facility. On May 13, 1986, Home Shopping Network went public on the American Stock Exchange. Within five years, the company would achieve over one billion dollars in annual net sales, a testament to Speer's vision and leadership. The success of this venture was so impressive that the Harvard M.B.A. Program assigned its students to analyze and critique the company's success.

In 1993, Speer was charged in a class-action suit that alleged he improperly accepted compensation from vendors; that the Company paid Nando DiFilippo, former executive vice-president, general counsel and secretary of the Company, to prevent him from disclosing such vendor bribes; and that the Company had failed to properly disclose certain related party transactions in its filings with the SEC.

Also in 1993, another suit was brought against Speer alleging a breach of fiduciary duties owed to the Company and its stockholders by failure to exercise due care and diligence in the management and administration of the affairs of the Company. The suit challenged the validity of a license agreement with Richard Speer (Roy Speer's son) pursuant to which the Company was given the exclusive rights to certain software and alleges that the Company wrongfully made payments to Richard Speer pursuant to a computer services agreement which was allegedly terminated. The suit alleged that the Company wrongfully made payments to Richard Speer of $3,502,000, $3,286,000 and $3,084,000 during the Company's 1992, 1991 and 1990 fiscal years, respectively, pursuant to the agreement. Merchandise that is unsuitable for sale via the Company's programs or outlet stores was sold by Richard Speer, who received a commission of 15% on the amount realized upon disposition. Richard Speer received $1,469,000, $1,615,000 and $1,427,000 and through this arrangement during the Company's 1992, 1991 and 1990 fiscal years, respectively. The suit also alleged that this 15% commission was commercially unreasonable. The suit alleged that the above-described arrangements would not have been entered into by the Company with an unrelated third party and that Roy and Richard Speer owned undisclosed interests in unspecified firms which sell merchandise to the Company. Speer settled all claims with the Plaintiffs before they ever went to trial.

He resigned from the Home Shopping Network in 1993.

== Personal life ==
Speer married Lynnda Short on July 22, 1960 at Calvary Baptist Church in Clearwater, Florida. They had two children, Richard Merrill Speer and Lisa Lynn Vickers. Roy also had a son, Robert R. Speer, from a previous marriage. He was Christian.

After his death at the age of 80 in 2012, Lynnda, acting as Speer's personal representative, filed a lawsuit against Morgan Stanley for $400 million.
