= WNYB =

Television station in Jamestown, New York

- Jamestown–Buffalo, New York; United States
- City: Jamestown, New York
- Channels: Digital: 5 (VHF); Virtual: 26

Programming
- Affiliations: 26.1: TCT; for others, see § Subchannels

Ownership
- Owner: Total Christian Television; (Radiant Life Ministries, Inc.)

History
- First air date: September 25, 1988
- Former call signs: WNOD (1987–1988); WTJA (1988–1996)
- Former channel numbers: Analog: 26 (UHF, 1988–1991, 1997–2009); Digital: 27 (UHF, 2004–2009), 26 (UHF, 2009–2019)
- Former affiliations: Independent (1988–1991); Dark (1991–1997); TBN (1997–2007)
- Call sign meaning: New York Buffalo (carried over calls from Channel 49)

Technical information
- Licensing authority: FCC
- Facility ID: 30303
- ERP: 4 kW
- HAAT: 463 m (1,519 ft)
- Transmitter coordinates: 42°23′36″N 79°13′43″W
- Translator(s): see § Translators

Links
- Public license information: Public file; LMS
- Website: www.tct.tv

Predecessor station
- WNYP
- Jamestown, New York
- Channels: Analog: 26 (UHF)

Programming
- Affiliations: CTV (1966–1969); Independent (1969)

Ownership
- Owner: Bud Paxson; (Trend Broadcasting, Inc.)
- Sister stations: WKSN, WKSN-FM

History
- First air date: November 27, 1967
- Last air date: 1969

Technical information
- ERP: 692 kW
- HAAT: 210 m (690 ft)
- Transmitter coordinates: 42°5′6″N 79°17′23″W

WNYB (channel 26) is a religious television station licensed to Jamestown, New York, United States, serving the Buffalo area. The station is owned by Total Christian Television (TCT). WNYB's transmitter is located on Center Road in Arkwright. The station maintained studios on Big Tree Road in Orchard Park until TCT ended local operations in June 2018.

WNYB operates a digital replacement translator on channel 27 to cover Buffalo proper. The station is also relayed on low-power translator WNIB-LD (channel 42) in Rochester.

== History ==
=== CTV invades America ===
The first license for channel 26 in Jamestown, New York, was granted to WNYP in 1966. The station's majority shareholder was Lowell W. "Bud" Paxson, who at the time owned Jamestown's WKSN radio and later co-founded the Home Shopping Network (HSN). It was the first American television station to affiliate with a Canadian network, signing a deal with CTV. Since the station could not afford a direct feed, station engineers switched to and from the signal of CTV's flagship CFTO-TV (channel 9) in Toronto whenever network programming was airing. WNYP was Paxson's first venture into television.

WNYP quickly became notorious and almost legendary among Western New York's broadcast community for technical gaffes and programming mishaps. For instance, the station showed the same episode of The Aquanauts several times, every day at the same time, over a two-week period. Also, the equipment used to pick up the off-air signal from CFTO would sometimes relay the video from another station broadcasting on VHF channel 9 instead (such as ABC affiliate WNYS-TV in Syracuse or CBS affiliate WWTV in Cadillac, Michigan) due to tropospheric propagation overwhelming CFTO's signal. Often, when CFTO programming actually was being rebroadcast, the station switcher failed to drop CFTO's identification to display the WNYP call sign, which was considered a violation of Federal Communications Commission (FCC) rules. Inexplicably, the audio line from a Jamestown radio station could sometimes be heard in the background when CTV programming was airing. Paxson also earned significant animus for airing programming from CHCH-TV (channel 11) and CBC Television's CBLT (channel 5) without permission. Although it had been legal to broadcast foreign programming in the United States without permission as a result of laws passed during World War II, he forgot to secure copyrights for the Canadian shows, and the programs' copyright holders won judgments against WNYP for infringement.

Since CTV, then as now, relies largely on American programming, Buffalo's "Big Three" U.S. network affiliates—WBEN-TV (channel 4, now WIVB-TV); WGR-TV (channel 2, now WGRZ); and WKBW-TV (channel 7)—threatened legal action in early 1969. Faced with the loss of its primary source of programming, WNYP cut back its local newscasts, laid off staff, and briefly attempted to use a prototype of what would become HSN's on-air product sales strategy to stay afloat. It briefly started to identify as WJTV, but quickly reverted to WNYP because a station in Jackson, Mississippi, already had those call letters. The death knell for the station sounded with the announcement that WUTV would sign on from Buffalo in 1970. Buffalo was not big enough at the time to support two independent stations, so Paxson opted to take the station off the air.

=== Later incarnations ===
After going dark, the station's equipment was sold to Elmira ABC affiliate WENY-TV (channel 36), who used much of it to aid in its launch. The channel 26 allocation was used for much of the 1970s and 1980s by a low-power experimental Appalachian Television Service "translator" relay station (W26AA) of WNED-TV from Buffalo, operated by the regional Board of Cooperative Educational Services, which was able to originate local programming from studios in Fredonia. Channel 26 is the last remaining survivor of WNED-TV's once massive translator network that had several repeaters scattered throughout the Southern Tier of Western New York; all of the others were shut down by 2012.

A new license was re-issued to a new group years later, and channel 26 signed on again on September 24, 1988, under the new call letters WTJA. Part of the station's programming lineup duplicated those on the Buffalo stations. It operated on a low budget, heavily relying on public domain material, and the station was virtually ignored by local advertisers. Buffalo-area cable providers refused to carry the station because its signal was barely acceptable even under the best conditions; its "Grade B" signal coverage barely reached the southern Buffalo suburbs. Under the circumstances, the station never thrived, and once again went dark in 1991.

=== TCT arrives ===
Grant Broadcasting purchased the license in 1995. Rather than immediately putting the station back on the air, Grant negotiated with Marion, Illinois–based Tri-State Christian Television (now Total Christian Television), owner of WNYB (channel 49), for the channel 49 license, in exchange for the channel 26 license, cash and a new, more powerful broadcasting facility in Arkwright. The facility featured one of the tallest towers in the region, atop one of the highest hills of western New York State. This changed channel 26 from having a very poor signal to one of the largest coverage areas in the Northeast. It provided at least secondary coverage from Erie, Pennsylvania, to the southwest suburbs of Toronto. Tri-State accepted and on January 10, 1997, it took over the channel 26 license and moved the WNYB intellectual unit there. Grant in turn took over channel 49, which became WB affiliate WNYO-TV; it became a MyNetworkTV affiliate in 2006 when The WB merged with UPN to form The CW.

=== End of local operations ===
In June 2018, after more than 21 years, TCT announced it had ceased local programming and was placing its former studios on Big Tree Road in Orchard Park up for sale. The change came with the elimination of the FCC's Main Studio Rule earlier in the year and a decision by TCT to consolidate all programming operations at the network's headquarters in Marion, Illinois.

== Technical information ==
=== Subchannels ===
The station's signal is multiplexed:

Subchannels of WNYB
Subchannel	Res.	Short name	Programming
26.1	1080i	WNYB HD	TCT
26.2	480i	SBN	Sonlife
26.3	480i	Toons	MeTV Toons
26.4	480i	GetTV	Great
26.5	480i	ShopLC	Shop LC
26.6	480i	Buzzr	Buzzr
26.7	480i	ONTV4U	OnTV4U (4:3)
26.8	480i	GDT	Infomercials
26.9	480i	WEST	WEST

Subchannels of WNIB-LD
Subchannel	Res.	Short name	Programming
42.1	1080i	WNIB HD	TCT
42.2	480i	SBN	Sonlife
42.3	480i	ONTV4U	OnTV4U (4:3)
42.4	480i	Shop LC	[Blank] (4:3)
42.5	480i	GDT	Infomercials (4:3)
42.6	480i	BizTV	Biz TV

=== Analog-to-digital conversion ===
WNYB ended regular programming on its analog signal, over UHF channel 26, in early May 2009. The station's digital signal relocated from its pre-transition UHF channel 27 to channel 26. The station switched to VHF channel 5 on August 2, 2019, as part of the FCC's spectrum incentive auction.

=== Translators ===
Call sign	City of license	Channel	ERP	HAAT	Facility ID	Transmitter coordinates
WNYB (DRT)	Buffalo	27 (UHF)	10 kW	240.6 m (789 ft)	30303	43°1′48.2″N 78°55′14.1″W
WNIB-LD	Rochester	11 (VHF)	3 kW	59.7 m (196 ft)	67785	43°15′47.3″N 77°39′34.7″W

==== Former translator ====
WNYB was previously relayed on Class A station WBNF-CD (channel 15) in Buffalo until 2023. As of 2026, WBNF originates local programming from Lockport Community Television and carries Spanish Catholic programming on its primary channel.
