= Lilly Broadcasting =

American broadcasting company

Lilly Broadcasting, LLC
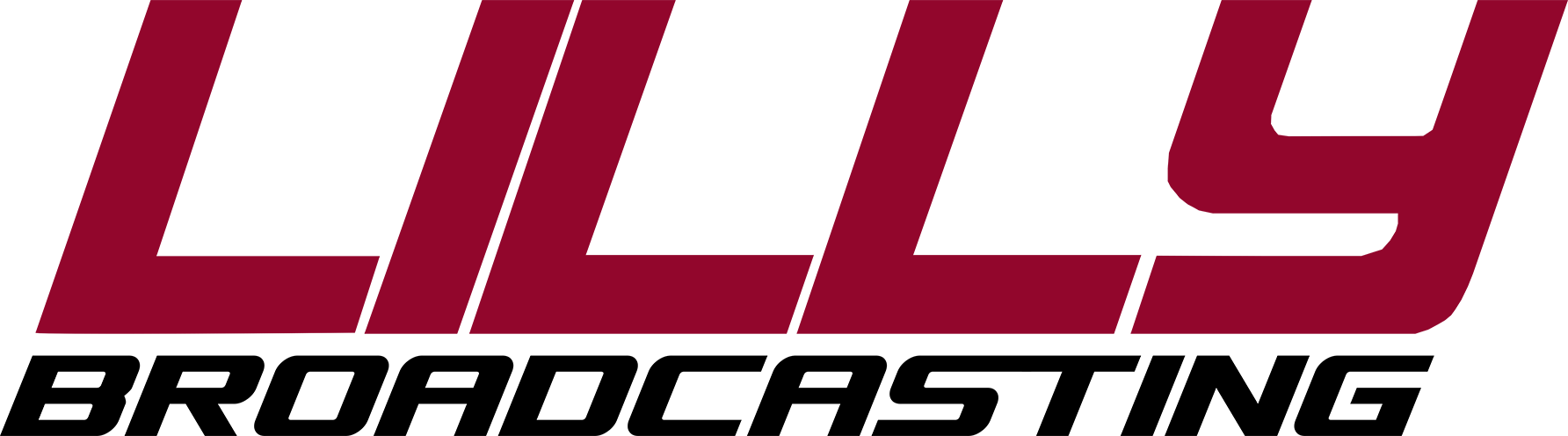
- Type: private limited liability company
- Industry: TV broadcasting
- Founded: September 1999; 27 years ago
- Headquarters: Erie, Pennsylvania, United States
- Subsidiaries: SJL Broadcasting; Glenora Radio Network
- Website: lillybroadcasting.com

Lilly Broadcasting, LLC is a privately owned by Brian and Kevin Lilly. The company was founded in September 1999 with the purchase of WENY-TV (ABC) and WENY-FM & AM radio. In 2002, Kevin Lilly purchased WSEE-TV (CBS) in Erie, Pennsylvania and have since added the CBS and The CW affiliates in Puerto Rico, Virgin Islands and ABC in the Virgin Islands.

Brian and Kevin Lilly are the sons of George Lilly, whose SJL Broadcast Management (also previously known as the Montecito Broadcast Group) was founded in 1984 and based in Montecito, California. SJL owns WICU-TV in Erie and the two Companies purchased three TV stations from Gateway Communications in 2000, and four stations from Emmis Communications in 2005.

Lilly Broadcasting most recently with Sankaty Advisors purchased KITV (ABC) in Hawaii. Lilly sold the station to Byron Allen's Allen Media Broadcasting in 2021.

== History ==
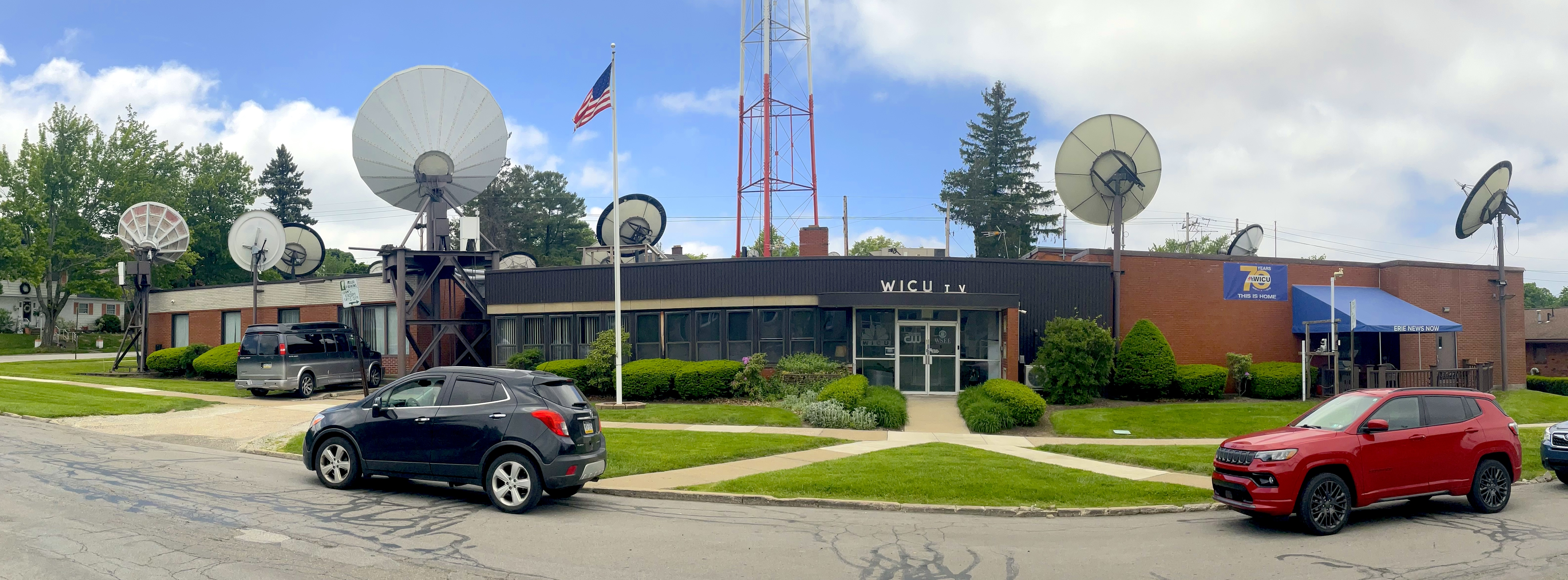
Lilly Broadcasting is headquartered in the studio facility of its Erie duopoly, WICU-TV/WSEE-TV.

WJRT-TV was sold to SJL Broadcast Management in 1989. In 1991, a SJL affiliated partnership, Media Communications Partners Limited Partnership, purchased WTVG.

SJL announced the sale of WJRT-TV and WTVG to Capital Cities/ABC for $155 million in October 1994 (Note: equivalent to $336,691,738 in 2025) after CBS signed a long-term deal with Meredith Corporation, owner of Flint's NBC affiliate, WNEM-TV. NBC was rumored to be courting WJRT-TV as a possible replacement for WNEM, prompting Capital Cities/ABC to buy the stations outright. The deal resulted in WTVG converting from an NBC affiliate to ABC.

In 2000, it purchased the Gateway Communications stations for $96 million. (Note: equivalent to $179,478,261 in 2025) In 2002, SJL sold off WOWK-TV to West Virginia Media Holdings for $40.5 million. (Note: equivalent to $72,495,375 in 2025) In April 2006, SJL sold off WBNG-TV to Granite Broadcasting for $45 million, (Note: equivalent to $71,867,778 in 2025) this was followed on July 26, 2006 by selling WTAJ-TV and the licensee assets of WLYH-TV to Nexstar Broadcasting Group for $56 million, (Note: equivalent to $89,435,457 in 2025) completely undoing the Gateway/SJL deal.

On July 24, 2007, Montecito announced the sale of all of its remaining stations except WICU (KHON-TV, KOIN, KSNW and KSNT) to New Vision Television, ending the partnership between SJL and The Blackstone Group. The Federal Communications Commission (FCC) granted approval of this sale in late-October of that year, and ownership was officially transferred on November 1.

On March 1, 2009, the last station formally owned by SJL, WICU, transferred its copyrights to Lilly Broadcasting when it merged its news operations with crosstown sister station WSEE-TV. Though SJL still technically exists (and still ostensibly owns WICU), its visible operations have now been subsumed by Lilly Broadcasting.

On November 3, 2010, Broadcasting & Cable magazine announced that SJL Broadcasting made an agreement with Disney to buy back WJRT-TV and WTVG, the two smallest stations in ABC's O&O portfolio. The sale was completed on April 1, 2011 with both stations general manager exiting their positions at change of ownership. Lilly announced on July 24, 2014, that it would sell both WJRT and WTVG to Gray Television in a $128 million transaction. (Note: equivalent to $174,079,280 in 2025) In 2016, Gray announced that it would operate its bureau in Washington, DC, in cooperation with Lilly.

On May 13, 2015, Hearst Television announced that it would sell KITV in Honolulu, Hawaii, and its satellites (KHVO in Hilo and KMAU in Wailuku) to SJL; the deal marks the return of the company to Hawaii, following its prior ownership of KHON-TV. The sale was approved by the Federal Communications Commission on July 10, 2015 and completed on September 1, 2015.

Lilly Broadcasting re-entered radio in 2019 by purchasing the three-station cluster in Warren, Pennsylvania, that had previously been owned by Frank Iorio's Radio Partners; Iorio sold off his only other broadcast asset, Pittsburgh's WJAS, to another buyer in 2020. Lilly had previously owned and operated radio stations in Elmira before selling those off a few years after acquiring that cluster.

On June 1 and September 2023, Lilly obtained the ABC and Fox affiliations for Guam respectively, as two cable-only channels after local KTGM and KEQI-LD were forced off the air as result of the damage produced by Typhoon Mawar in may 2023 on its transmitting facilities and studios. The company would latter make an offer to buy the two licenses from Sorensen Media Group and reconstruct their transmitting facilities in 2025. After both KEQI-LD and KTGM resumed operations on October 29 and 31 respectively, the FCC approved the sale on January 6, 2026 and it was completed on February 27.

In April 2025, Lilly acquired WVXF, WVGN-LD in U.S. Virgin Islands and WSJP-LD in Puerto Rico from Caribbean Broadcasting. In December 2025, the company announced the establishment of the Glenora Radio Network, as its radio division merges with MediaOne Radio Group (the company holding a monopoly on radio in Jamestown, New York and also owning stations in Ashtabula, Ohio) under Lilly ownership.

== Stations ==
=== Current stations ===
- Stations are arranged in alphabetical order by state and city of license.

Stations currently owned by Lilly Broadcasting
Media market	State/Terr.	Station	Purchased	Notes
Tamuning	Guam	KTGM	2026	
Tamuning	Guam	KEQI-LD	2026	
Marquette	Michigan	WZMQ	2017	
Elmira	New York	WENY-TV	2000	
Ithaca	New York	W34FR-D	2018	(Note: Operated by WENY as NY Local Ithaca.)
Jamestown	New York	WHUG	2026	
Jamestown	New York	WJTN	2026	
Jamestown	New York	WKSN	2026	
Jamestown	New York	WKZA	2026	
Jamestown	New York	WQFX-FM	2026	
Jamestown	New York	WWSE	2026	
Ashtabula	Ohio	WFUN	2026	
Ashtabula	Ohio	WFXJ-FM	2026	
Ashtabula	Ohio	WREO-FM	2026	
Ashtabula	Ohio	WYBL	2026	
Ashtabula	Ohio	WZOO-FM	2026	
Erie	Pennsylvania	WICU-FM	2019	
Erie	Pennsylvania	WICU-TV	1996	
Erie	Pennsylvania	WSEE-TV	2002	(Note: Operates under a shared services agreement with WICU.)
Erie	Pennsylvania	WEPA-LD	2025	
Erie	Pennsylvania	WXTM-LD	2025	
Warren	Pennsylvania	WICU	2019	
Warren	Pennsylvania	WNAE	2019	
Warren	Pennsylvania	WRRN	2019	
Aguadilla	Puerto Rico	WSJP-LD	2025	
Charlotte Amalie	U.S. Virgin Islands	WVXF	2025	
Charlotte Amalie	U.S. Virgin Islands	WVGN-LD	2025	
Christiansted	U.S. Virgin Islands	WCVI-TV	2019	

=== Non-broadcast ===
- One Caribbean Television
- CBS Puerto Rico
- CW IN TV

=== Former stations ===
Stations formerly owned by Lilly Broadcasting
Media market	State	Station	Purchased	Sold	Notes
San Luis Obispo	California	KSBY	1996	2002	
Hilo	Hawaii	KHAW-TV	2006	2007	(Note: Satellite of KHON-TV.)
Hilo	Hawaii	KHVO	2015	2021	(Note: Satellite of KITV.)
Honolulu	Hawaii	KHON-TV	2006	2007	
Honolulu	Hawaii	KITV	2015	2021	
Kauai	Hawaii	K55DZ	2006	2007	
Maui–Wailuku	Hawaii	KAII-TV	2006	2007	
Maui–Wailuku	Hawaii	KMAU	2015	2021	
Garden City–Dodge City	Kansas	KSNG	1988	1995	(Note: Satellite of KSNW.)
Garden City–Dodge City	Kansas	KSNG	2006	2007	(Note: Satellite of KSNW.)
Great Bend–Hays–Salina	Kansas	KSNC	1988	1995	
Great Bend–Hays–Salina	Kansas	KSNC	2006	2007	
Topeka	Kansas	KSNT	1988	1995	
Topeka	Kansas	KSNT	2006	2007	
Wichita–Hutchinson	Kansas	KSNW	1988	1995	
Wichita–Hutchinson	Kansas	KSNW	2006	2007	
McCook	Nebraska	KSNK	1988	1995	
McCook	Nebraska	KSNK	2006	2007	
Flint	Michigan	WJRT-TV	1989	1995	
Flint	Michigan	WJRT-TV	2011	2014	
Joplin	Missouri	KOAM-TV	1991	1995	
Billings	Montana	KTVQ	1984	1994	
Butte	Montana	KXLF-TV	1984	1986	
Great Falls	Montana	KRTV	1984	1986	
Missoula	Montana	KPAX-TV	1984	1986	
Binghamton	New York	WBNG-TV	2000	2006	
Buffalo	New York	WGRZ-TV	1986	1988	
Syracuse	New York	WSTM-TV	1986	1992	
Toledo	Ohio	WTVG	1991	1995	
Toledo	Ohio	WTVG	2011	2014	
Portland	Oregon	KOIN	2006	2007	
Altoona	Pennsylvania	WTAJ-TV	2000	2006	
Harrisburg	Pennsylvania	WLYH-TV	2000	2006	(Note: Owned by SJL, but operated by Clear Channel Communications.)
Huntington–Charleston	West Virginia	WOWK-TV	2000	2002	
