= WICU-FM =

Radio station in Lawrence Park, Pennsylvania

- Lawrence Park, Pennsylvania; United States
- Broadcast area: Erie, Pennsylvania
- Frequency: 92.7 MHz (HD Radio)
- Branding: HAPPI 927

Programming
- Language: English
- Format: Contemporary hit radio
- Affiliations: United Stations Radio Networks

Ownership
- Owner: SJL Broadcasting; (SJL of Pennsylvania, Inc.)
- Operator: Lilly Broadcasting
- Sister stations: WICU-TV; WSEE-TV

History
- First air date: November 9, 2012
- Former call signs: WEHP (2012–2019); WICU (2019–2020)
- Call sign meaning: derived from sister station WICU-TV

Technical information
- Licensing authority: FCC
- Facility ID: 189528
- Class: A
- ERP: 6,000 watts
- HAAT: 3 meters (9.8 ft)
- Transmitter coordinates: 42°7′25.2″N 80°7′1.2″W
- Repeater: 1310 WICU (Warren)

Links
- Public license information: Public file; LMS
- Webcast: Listen live
- Website: happi927.com

WICU-FM (92.7 MHz) is a contemporary hit radio-formatted radio station in Erie, Pennsylvania, licensed to Lawrence Park, Pennsylvania, under the ownership of SJL Broadcasting (a sister company to Lilly Broadcasting). It uses the moniker "Happi 927". WICU-FM is simulcast in Warren on Lilly-owned WICU (1310 AM and 96.7 FM).

== History ==
The station, using the call sign WEHP, signed on the air November 9, 2012, stunting with songs including the word "Happy"; at 12 p.m. on November 16, 2012, it formally launched its contemporary hit radio format under the branding of "Happi 92.7". The station was originally owned by Rick Rambaldo'a Erie Radio Company; the construction permit had been acquired, under the name First Channel Communications, for $2,068,000 in a May 2011 Federal Communications Commission (FCC) auction, outbidding an entity affiliated with Connoisseur Media. Rambaldo had previously a group of Erie radio stations that was sold to NextMedia in 1999, and subsequently acquired by Connoisseur Media and then iHeartMedia. The WEHP call sign was assigned on May 16, 2012.

In September 2019, Erie Radio Company announced the sale of the station to SJL of Pennsylvania, owner of WICU-TV, for $1.33 million; SJL is a sister company to Lilly Broadcasting, whose holdings in the area include WSEE-TV and three Warren radio stations. Under the terms of the agreement, Erie Radio Company retained the rights to the "Happi" brand, but granted SJL/Lilly a perpetual royalty-free license to use the name. The sale was completed on December 31, 2019, at which point the call sign was changed to WICU (the "-FM" suffix was added on February 13, 2020). On April 1, 2020, WICU-FM began simulcasting in Warren on WICU (1310 AM and 96.7 FM).

In September 2021, WICU-FM relocated its studios to the facilities of WICU-TV and WSEE-TV, up State Street from its original studios.
