= WPRU-LP =

Television station in Aguadilla, Puerto Rico (2004–2014)

- Last logo used from January 1, 2013, until November 1, 2014
- Aguadilla, Puerto Rico
- Channels: Analog: 20 (UHF)

Programming
- Affiliations: Defunct

Ownership
- Owner: Caribbean Broadcasting Network
- Sister stations: WSJP-LD

History
- First air date: January 16, 2004
- Last air date: November 1, 2014; (10 years, 289 days); (license canceled January 14, 2021)
- Former call signs: W20CF (2002–2004)
- Former affiliations: ABC (2004–2014)
- Call sign meaning: Puerto Rico UHF

Technical information
- Licensing authority: FCC
- Facility ID: 127514
- ERP: 5 kW

Links
- Public license information: LMS

WPRU-LP (channel 20) was a low-power television station in Aguadilla, Puerto Rico, affiliated with ABC and owned by the Caribbean Broadcasting Network.

== History ==
The channel was launched in 2004.

The station did not produce its own local newscasts.

In September 2014, it was announced that ABC would move to WORA-TV on November 1 as a new subchannel. In late 2019, the ABC affiliation moved to the main channel of WORA-DT, after Telemundo discontinued its WKAQ-TV repeater on WORA-TV.

The station has been silent since January 2014. From that point until the ABC affiliation ended, it continued broadcasting on channel 18.1 of sister station WSJP-LD. At some point on March 20, 2015, WSJP-LD removed its simulcast of WORA-DT2/ABC 5 from 18.1 and moved its third subchannel to 18.1 from 18.3 to replace it.

Caribbean Broadcasting Network surrendered WPRU-LP's license to the Federal Communications Commission on January 14, 2021, who cancelled it the same day.
