= WCVI-TV =

Television station in Christiansted, U.S. Virgin Islands

- Christiansted; United States Virgin Islands
- Channels: Digital: 23 (UHF); Virtual: 23
- Branding: ABC USVI; CBS U.S. Virgin Islands (23.2); USVI News

Programming
- Affiliations: 23.1: ABC; 23.2: CBS; for others, see § Subchannels

Ownership
- Owner: Lilly Broadcasting; (Lilly Broadcasting Ventures, LLC)
- Sister stations: WSJP-LD, WVGN-LD, WVXF

History
- First air date: May 16, 1997
- Former call signs: WATU (May–June 1997)
- Former channel numbers: Analog: 27 (UHF, 1997–2002), 39 (UHF, 2002–2009)
- Former affiliations: UPN (1997–2006); The CW (2006–2014); LeSEA (2014–2018); Religious Independent (2018–2019); UATV (secondary, until 2006)
- Call sign meaning: Christiansted, Virgin Islands

Technical information
- Licensing authority: FCC
- Facility ID: 83304
- ERP: 23.7 kW
- HAAT: 130 m (427 ft)
- Transmitter coordinates: 17°44′53″N 64°43′40″W

Links
- Public license information: Public file; LMS
- Website: usvinews.tv

WCVI-TV (channel 23) is a television station licensed to Christiansted, Saint Croix, serving the United States Virgin Islands as a dual affiliate of ABC and CBS. Owned by Lilly Broadcasting, the station maintains transmitter facilities on Estate Princess Hill.

== History ==
The station was founded as WATU on May 16, 1997, but then changed its call letters to the current WCVI-TV that same year on June 30, as an affiliate of the United Paramount Network (UPN). The WATU calls were previously used by the now-defunct NBC affiliate in Augusta, Georgia from the station's sign on from 1968 to 1981. Before then, UPN programming was seen via satellite from New York City's WWOR-TV. At one point, the station also carried Urban America Television as a secondary affiliation; this arrangement was discontinued when that network ceased operations on May 1, 2006. That September, WCVI joined The CW following the shutdown of both UPN and The WB.

On April 17, 2014, Virgin Blue reached a deal to sell WCVI-TV to LeSEA Broadcasting Corporation (now Family Broadcasting Corporation); the sale was completed on July 27, 2014, with LeSEA assuming ownership the next day. Upon acquisition, WCVI dropped its CW programming in exchange for programs from LeSEA and World Harvest.

WCVI 23.2 has served as the ABC affiliate for the Virgin Islands since the network ended its affiliation with WSVI-TV at the end of 2015. At the time, ABC announced that WCVI would become its new affiliate for the territory, although station management denied any knowledge of such an arrangement. ABC programming duly began in 2016; however, as WCVI 23.2 began relaying a feed of WENY-TV in Elmira, New York provided to the area by Lilly Broadcasting, non-network timeslots are filled by paid programming and Lilly's One Caribbean Television.

On September 10, 2019, WCVI was sold to Lilly Broadcasting for $85,000, pending approval of the Federal Communications Commission (FCC). The sale allowed Lilly to invoke must-carry rules on local cable and satellite providers, avoiding a potential repeat of notorious carriage disputes with Dish Network and DirecTV in 2017. The sale was completed on November 5, 2019. Lilly also announced that its CBS feed for the market, previously only available on cable via a separate feed of Erie, Pennsylvania affiliate WSEE-TV, would move to WCVI-DT1 on November 20. It was the first time in three years that the U.S. Virgin Islands had one of the "Big Four" networks carried on their primary channels on a full-power TV station since WSVI-TV switched from ABC to Ion Television on December 31, 2015.

== Subchannels ==
The station's signal is multiplexed:

Subchannels of WCVI-TV
| Subchannel | Res. | Short name | Programming |
|---|---|---|---|
| 23.1 | 720p | WCVIDT | ABC |
| 23.2 | 1080i | ECVI | CBS |
| 23.3 | 1080i | WVGN | NBC (WVGN-LD) |
| 23.4 | 720p | WVXF-DT | Fox (WVXF) |
| 23.5 | 480i | WVXF-D2 | Cozi TV (WVXF) |

Simulcast of subchannels of another station

== Logos ==
WCVI's logo as a UPN affiliate from 2002 to 2006.

WCVI's logo as a CW affiliate on analog channel 39 from 2006 to 2009.

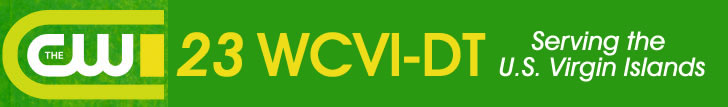
WCVI's logo as a CW affiliate on digital channel 23 from 2009 to 2014.

WCVI's logo as a LeSEA affiliate from 2014 until June 2018.

WCVI's logo as a Family Broadcasting Corporation station from 2018 to 2019.

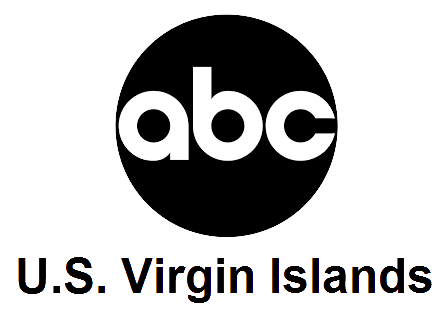
WCVI's former ABC logo used from 2015 to 2020.
