= WVGN-LD =

Television station in Charlotte Amalie, U.S. Virgin Islands

- Charlotte Amalie; United States Virgin Islands
- Channels: Digital: 19 (UHF); Virtual: 19
- Branding: NBC U.S. Virgin Islands; USVI News

Programming
- Affiliations: NBC

Ownership
- Owner: Lilly Broadcasting; (Lilly Broadcasting Ventures, LLC)
- Sister stations: WCVI-TV, WVXF, WSJP-LD

History
- Founded: October 4, 2001
- First air date: January 6, 2004
- Former call signs: W14CP (2001–2003); WVGN-LP (2003–2012)
- Former channel numbers: Analog: 14 (UHF, 2001–2012)
- Call sign meaning: Virgin Islands

Technical information
- Licensing authority: FCC
- Facility ID: 130029
- Class: LD
- ERP: 3.25 kW
- HAAT: 448 m (1,470 ft)
- Transmitter coordinates: 18°21′19″N 64°56′49″W

Links
- Public license information: LMS
- Website: www.wvgn.com

WVGN-LD (channel 19) is a low-power television station in Charlotte Amalie, Saint Thomas, serving as the NBC affiliate for the United States Virgin Islands. Owned by Lilly Broadcasting, it is a sister station to dual CBS/ABC affiliate WCVI-TV (channel 23) and dual Cozi TV/Fox affiliate WVXF (channel 17). WVGN-LD's transmitter is located on Signal Hill.

WVGN is available on Viya Cable channel 11, and as part of the Virgin Islands locals package on Dish Network. The station was also available in Puerto Rico on most cable and satellite providers until December 31, 2013 when it was replaced by a new NBC station on WKAQ-TV's third digital subchannel.

The station previously simulcast the 6 a.m., 5 p.m., 6 p.m., and 11 p.m. ET editions of WNBC's News 4 New York broadcasts. Notably, WNBC was the default NBC affiliate for the Virgin Islands until WVGN signed on. WVGN did not provide any local newscasts for the U.S. Virgin Islands until Lilly acquired it in 2025; it now simulcasts USVI News produced by sister station WCVI.

== Subchannel ==
Subchannel of WVGN-LD
Subchannel	Res.	Short name	Programming
19.1	1080i	WVGN	NBC
