= Jim Roselle =

- Born: April 15, 1926; Jamestown, NY, U.S.
- Died: March 23, 2016 (aged 89); Jamestown, NY, USA
- Occupation: Radio personality
- Years active: 1953–2016

James Roselle (April 15, 1926 – March 23, 2016) was an American radio personality. Roselle worked at WJTN in Jamestown, New York from 1953 until his death in 2016.

== Early life ==
Roselle was born in Jamestown in 1926 and graduated from Jamestown High School in 1944. He attended St. Lawrence University and studied communications.

== Career ==
Roselle began his radio career at a station in Harrisburg, Pennsylvania, in 1951, but returned to his hometown of Jamestown two years later.

Beginning in 1974, Roselle did live broadcasts each summer from Chautauqua Institution. He was honored with a commemorative plaque at the Institution in 2015 for his 40-plus years of broadcasts.

Through his work at Chautauqua Institution, Roselle interviewed many important figures including Bill Clinton, Hillary Clinton, Jane Goodall, Lucille Ball, Tim Russert, Richard Simmons, Rocky Marciano, David McCullough, Doris Kearns Goodwin, Robert Pinsky, Eliot Spitzer, Phil Donahue, Joyce Carol Oates, Amy Tan, Roger Rosenblatt and many more.

Roselle was inducted into the New York State Broadcasters Association Hall of Fame in 2010.

Roselle was still an active member of the Jamestown media community when he died at the age of 89 on March 23, 2016.

== Personal ==
In 2014, Roselle published his memoirs, entitled The Best Times of My Life.

Roselle was a fan of the Notre Dame Fighting Irish football team and attended many of the team's games. He was inducted into the Chautauqua Sports Hall of Fame as an honorary member in 2015, for his work in the community.
