= WUPT-CA =

Class A TV station in Crystal Falls, Michigan (1980–2003)

- Crystal Falls–Marquette, Michigan; United States
- City: Crystal Falls, Michigan
- Channels: Analog: 25 (UHF)

Programming
- Affiliations: Independent (1980−1992, WLRE/WGBA translator); Fox (1992–1994, WGBA translator); Outdoor Channel (1994−March 2000); UPN (1995−January 2000 and January 2001−May 2003); AIN (March 2000−September 2001); America One (September 2001−July 2003); UATV (May−July 2003)

Ownership
- Owner: Western Upper Peninsula Television, Inc.

History
- Founded: January 18, 1980
- First air date: December 10, 1980
- Last air date: July 2003 (license canceled on October 27, 2003)
- Former call signs: W49AF (1980−1996); WUPT-LP (1996−2001)
- Former channel numbers: Analog: 49 (UHF, 1980–October 2001)
- Call sign meaning: Western Upper Peninsula Television (licensee); United Paramount Television (former affiliation)

Technical information
- Licensing authority: FCC
- Facility ID: 14654
- Class: CA
- ERP: 1.12 kW
- Translator(s): WUPT-LP 43 Republic, MI

Links
- Public license information: Public file; LMS

WUPT-CA (channel 25) was a low-power, Class A television station licensed to Crystal Falls, Michigan, United States, which served the western Upper Peninsula of Michigan as an affiliate of UPN. The station was owned by Western Upper Peninsula Television.

WUPT-CA also had a translator in Republic with the callsign WUPT-LP, broadcasting on channel 43.

== History ==
The station was founded on January 18, 1980, and began broadcasting on December 10 of that same year. It was granted Class A status on March 8, 2001, and moved to channel 25 in October of that year. The station became a UPN affiliate when the network launched on January 16, 1995. The station removed UPN programming in January 2000, while carrying the Outdoor Channel until March 1 when it switched to AIN. UPN programming returned to the station in January 2001, while later switching to America One in September of that year.

When WUPT moved its UPN affiliation to Fox affiliate WMQF (as a secondary affiliation) on May 9, 2003, it switched to UATV and signed off in July. The Federal Communications Commission (FCC) canceled the station's license on October 27, 2003.
