= Bud Paxson =

American businessman (1935–2015)

- Born: Lowell White Paxson; April 17, 1935; Rochester, New York, U.S
- Died: January 9, 2015 (aged 79); Kalispell, Montana, U.S.
- Known for: Co-founder of Home Shopping Club; Founder of Pax TV

Lowell White "Bud" Paxson (April 17, 1935 – January 9, 2015) was an American media executive. In 1982, Paxson and his business partner, Roy Speer, co-founded the Home Shopping Club (now called the Home Shopping Network). He established Pax TV in 1998, a television network focusing on family-friendly content.

== Life and career ==
Lowell White Paxson was born on April 17, 1935 in Rochester, New York. Paxson began his career as an owner of WACK radio, a little 500-watt radio station in the village of Newark, New York. His next attempt at media ownership was radio station WXYJ (AM 1340) and TV station WNYP (channel 26) in Jamestown, New York. Paxson, who bought the stations in 1966, attempted to affiliate WNYP with the CTV Television Network out of Canada (a first for an American television station); by 1969, the TV station had failed. Paxson later emerged as the owner of a small AM radio station, WWQT (1470 AM), in Clearwater, Florida. There, in 1977, an advertiser had plenty of product to sell—avocado-green-colored can openers—but ran out of funds to purchase airtime. Paxson instructed talk-show host Bob Circosta, who had a talk show from noon until 3:00 p.m., to sell the can openers live over the airwaves, and both men were stunned at the audience response. All 118 can openers were purchased within the hour on August 28, 1977. This started the Suncoast International Bargainers Club.

Sensing the sales potential of live, on-air product selling, Paxson and financier Roy Speer co-founded a local cable TV channel (channel 52 on Vision Cable) in 1982 that sold products directly to Florida viewers, and then launched nationwide in 1985. The channel was the Home Shopping Club, later Home Shopping Network (currently known as HSN), and Paxson's former radio man Bob Circosta was tapped as the network's first-ever host. HSN soon became a billion dollar juggernaut and began the home shopping / electronic retailing industry. In 1996, the two sold HSN to Hollywood executive Barry Diller.

Paxson then formed Paxson Communications Corporation and bought radio stations, TV stations, and billboards, primarily in Florida. Eventually, he sold those and put the money into PAX TV (currently known as Ion Television), a new network of family-friendly TV shows. The channel also reflected Paxson's background as an evangelical Christian (since 1985), which he spoke of openly. PAX TV began on August 31, 1998.

During the time between the sale of HSN and the founding of PAX TV, Paxson moved his headquarters from Tampa to West Palm Beach.

However, the network never received anywhere near the ratings or advertising revenue of the other networks. In addition, PAX TV lost a few affiliates, such as when Paxson sold its Dayton, Ohio, and Green Bay, Wisconsin, stations to ACME Communications so that group could affiliate them with The WB (though PAX TV programming continued to air overnight on those stations for a few years), and the network was unable to offer their programming in some markets, like St, Louis, Charlotte and Pittsburgh.

On July 1, 2005, PAX TV became "i: Independent Television". In November of that year, NBCUniversal, which owned 22 percent of i, began a nine-month period during which it could buy the rest of the network. Possibly sensing that NBCU would do so, and beset with lawsuits over the operation of i, Paxson resigned from the company he founded.

In addition, Paxson became Ion Media Networks, and NBCU executive R. Brandon Burgess became the chief executive officer. In time, i was rebranded to Ion Television, which since 2020 has been a subsidiary of the E. W. Scripps Company.

== Personal life ==
Paxson's first two marriages, to Jean Blauvelt and Barbara Chapman, ended in divorce.

Paxson became a born-again Christian on New Year's Eve 1986. In 1990, he married Marla Bright who survived him after their 25 years of marriage. Paxson had two sons and a daughter from his first marriage and a stepdaughter from his third marriage. He died in Kalispell, Montana in 2015 at the age of 79.

== See also ==
- Ion Television
- Ion Media
- Home Shopping Network
- The Worship Network
