= Clarendon, Pennsylvania =

Borough in Pennsylvania, US

Clarendon
- Borough
- Location of Clarendon in Warren County, Pennsylvania.

- Location of Clarendon in Pennsylvania
- Coordinates: 41°46′52″N 79°5′42″W
- Country: United States
- State: Pennsylvania
- County: Warren
- Founded: 1872

Government
  - Mayor: Tommy Eaton

Area
  - Total: 0.34 sq mi (0.87 km^{2})
  - Land: 0.34 sq mi (0.87 km^{2})
  - Water: 0 sq mi (0.00 km^{2})

Population (2020)
  - Total: 410
  - Density: 1,217.3/sq mi (470.01/km^{2})
- Time zone: UTC-4 (EST)
  - Summer (DST): UTC-5 (EDT)
- Area code: 814
- FIPS code: 42-13776

Clarendon is a borough in Warren County, Pennsylvania, United States. As of the 2020 census, Clarendon had a population of 410.

== Geography ==
Clarendon is located at 41°46′52″N 79°5′42″W (41.781091, -79.095090).

According to the United States Census Bureau, the borough has a total area of 0.4 square miles (1.0 km^{2}), all land.

== Demographics ==
Historical population
Census	Pop.	Note	%±
1880	295		—
1890	1,297		339.7%
1900	1,092		−15.8%
1910	933		−14.6%
1920	928		−0.5%
1930	938		1.1%
1940	824		−12.2%
1950	748		−9.2%
1960	825		10.3%
1970	735		−10.9%
1980	776		5.6%
1990	650		−16.2%
2000	564		−13.2%
2010	450		−20.2%
2020	410		−8.9%

As of the census of 2000, there were 564 people, 220 households, and 150 families residing in the borough. The population density was 1,308.6 inhabitants per square mile (505.3/km^{2}). There were 239 housing units at an average density of 554.5 per square mile (214.1/km^{2}). The racial makeup of the borough was 97.52% White, 0.18% Native American, 1.06% Asian, and 1.24% from two or more races. Hispanic or Latino of any race were 1.06% of the population.

There were 220 households, out of which 32.7% had children under the age of 18 living with them, 55.9% were married couples living together, 8.6% had a female householder with no husband present, and 31.8% were non-families. 26.8% of all households were made up of individuals, and 15.5% had someone living alone who was 65 years of age or older. The average household size was 2.56 and the average family size was 3.10.

In the borough the population was spread out, with 27.1% under the age of 18, 8.5% from 18 to 24, 26.4% from 25 to 44, 20.9% from 45 to 64, and 17.0% who were 65 years of age or older. The median age was 36 years. For every 100 females there were 98.6 males. For every 100 females age 18 and over, there were 97.6 males.

The median income for a household in the borough was $27,750, and the median income for a family was $30,313. Males had a median income of $29,083 versus $21,625 for females. The per capita income for the borough was $13,774. About 11.8% of families and 15.5% of the population were below the poverty line, including 23.9% of those under age 18 and 10.0% of those age 65 or over.

== Education ==
It is in the Warren County School District.
