= HSN =

American home shopping television network

HSN, Inc.
- Type: Private
- Traded as: Nasdaq: HSNI
- Industry: Cable Television; Satellite Television
- Founded: 1977; 49 years ago
- Founders: Lowell Paxson; Roy Speer
- Fate: Acquired by Liberty Interactive Corporation in 2017, now co-owned with QVC
- Headquarters: West Chester, Pennsylvania, United States
- Key people: Mindy Grossman (CEO, 2006–2017)
- Parent: QVC Group (formerly Qurate Retail Group) (2017–present)
- Divisions: Cornerstone Brands
- Website: HSN.com

HSN
- Country: United States
- Broadcast area: Worldwide
- Headquarters: West Chester, Pennsylvania, United States

Programming
- Picture format: 1080i (HDTV) (HD feed downgraded to letterboxed 480i for the SDTV feed)

Ownership
- Owner: QVC Group (formerly Qurate Retail Group and before that, Liberty Interactive)
- Sister channels: HSN2

History
- Launched: September 20, 1982; 44 years ago
- Former names: Home Shopping Club (1982–1985); Home Shopping Network (1985–2000)

Links
- Website: www.hsn.com

Availability

Terrestrial
- ABC Owned Television Stations: -DT4 channel position; list of stations
- Over-the-air as a subchannel: Consult local listings

Streaming media
- Digital media receiver: Roku and Apple TV (4th generation)
- Service(s): DirecTV Stream, Pluto TV, Samsung TV Plus, Sling Freestream, The Roku Channel, YouTube TV,
- Website: HSN Live Stream; HSN2 Live Streaming

HSN, Inc. an initialism of its former name Home Shopping Network, is an American free-to-air television network owned by the QVC Group (formerly Qurate Retail Group), which also owns catalog company Cornerstone Brands. It is based in West Chester, Pennsylvania.

As of July 2014, Joy Mangano holds the record for most units sold in a day with 216,000 units of pillow sets.

== History ==
The forerunner of HSN was launched by Lowell Paxson (who later established PAX-TV, which is now Ion Television) and Roy Speer in 1982 as the Home Shopping Channel, a local cable channel seen on Vision Cable and Group W Cable in Pinellas County, Florida. It expanded into the first national shopping network three years later on July 1, 1985, changing its name to the Home Shopping Club (renamed later as Home Shopping Network), and pioneering the concept of a televised sales pitch for consumer goods and services. Its competitor and future owner QVC was launched the following year.

In 1986, HSN began a second network that broadcast free-to-air on a number of television stations it had acquired under the name Silver King Broadcasting. In 1992, HSN spun off from Silver King Broadcasting, and afterwards saw Liberty Media acquire stock in the network. In 1996, the station group was sold back to Silver King Broadcasting, which was now owned by Barry Diller, and changed its name to "HSN Inc." after its merger with Silver King was completed. Under Diller's leadership, the HSN also acquired the USA Network, Sci-Fi Channel and Universal Television in October 1997. This resulted in HSN Inc. being changed to USA Network Inc. The purchase was finalized in February 1998.

In September 2000, Home Shopping Network changed its name to HSN.

Mindy Grossman became CEO of HSN in 2006, and aggressively reinvented and relaunched the brand. She took HSN public in 2008 and has overseen its multibillion-dollar retail portfolio and multimedia expansion. Grossman left HSNi in May 2017 to helm Weight Watchers.

In April 2017, HSN CEO Mindy Grossman stepped down to assume the CEO position at Weight Watchers. On July 6, 2017, Liberty Interactive announced it would buy the remaining 62% of HSN stock it did not already own to acquire the company for its QVC Group. QVC CEO Mike George would be CEO of the combined company.

In September 2018, HSN had partnered with Pickler & Ben for a "shop the show" feature that allows viewers to buy featured items from HSN via the show's website and HSN.com.

In May 2023, HSN's parent Qurate Retail Group's stock was facing a delisting from the Nasdaq if share prices were unable to rebound, as their stock had declined over 80% over the past year. In October 2023, CreditRiskMonitor reported that Qurate Retail Group was nearing a potential Chapter 11 bankruptcy filing. On February 21, 2025, HSN's parent Qurate Retail Group officially changed its name to QVC Group.

On April 15, 2026, QVC Group warned that it was preparing to file for Chapter 11 bankruptcy as soon as the end of that day, citing steadily viewer declines and debt burdens. QVC Group plans to enter a prepackaged restructuring support agreement with its creditors and exit Chapter 11 bankruptcy within no later than 90 days, or by around July 2026. On April 16, QVC Group filed for Chapter 11 bankruptcy protection in the United States District Court for the Southern District of Texas with plans to reduce over $5 billion in long-term debt, which will allow for the company to continue operating while having over $1 billion in debt remaining.

== Sister channels ==
- HSN2, launched on August 1, 2010, acts as a timeshift channel carrying tape-delayed presentations of products and programming. Dish Network has carried it since launch.
- America's Store, formerly the Home Shopping Club Overnight Service, was HSN's secondary service that was on the air from 1988 until April 2007.

== Operations ==
Until 2025, HSN's United States operations were based in St. Petersburg, Florida, which housed its corporate headquarters, studio and broadcasting facilities. Additional call center facilities are located in Roanoke, Virginia & Toledo, Ohio. Distribution centers are situated in Roanoke, Piney Flats, Tennessee, and Fontana, California. In October 2018, Quarate announced the closure of the Roanoke distribution center in favor of a combined QVC/HSN distribution center to be located in Bethlehem, PA. In January 2025, it was announced that HSN would be closing its St. Petersburg headquarters and relocating to West Chester, Pennsylvania, home of HSN and QVC parent company Qurate Retail Group.

As of today, HSN and QVC are carried over the digital public airwaves and can be viewed without a cable subscription or a streaming device. Additionally, a new Streaming service was introduced to cable providers, which provides a different shopping experience compared to if a viewer went online and ordered merchandise.

== Technology ==
=== Call center ===
HSN National began with a standard rotary phone system that concentrated calls to the front of the queue. This corresponded to the front row of order takers in the HSN Studio at the Levitz Center (so named as the location was a former Levitz furniture store) in Clearwater, Florida. After several months, this system was no longer adequate, and HSN entered a phase where a phone system from GTE was used. HSN claimed that the system's inability to handle the high call volumes resulted in a loss of business. HSN sued GTE for $1.5 billion. In a counter-libel suit, GTE claimed that HSN had slandered the company; GTE won a $100 million judgment. Both parties settled out of court.

=== Original order-taking system ===
HSN developed its original order-taking system on a Burroughs Large System mainframe using the LINC 10 fourth generation language.

== See also ==
- Home shopping host
- List of over-the-air Home Shopping Network affiliates
