= WSEE-TV =

Television station in Erie, Pennsylvania

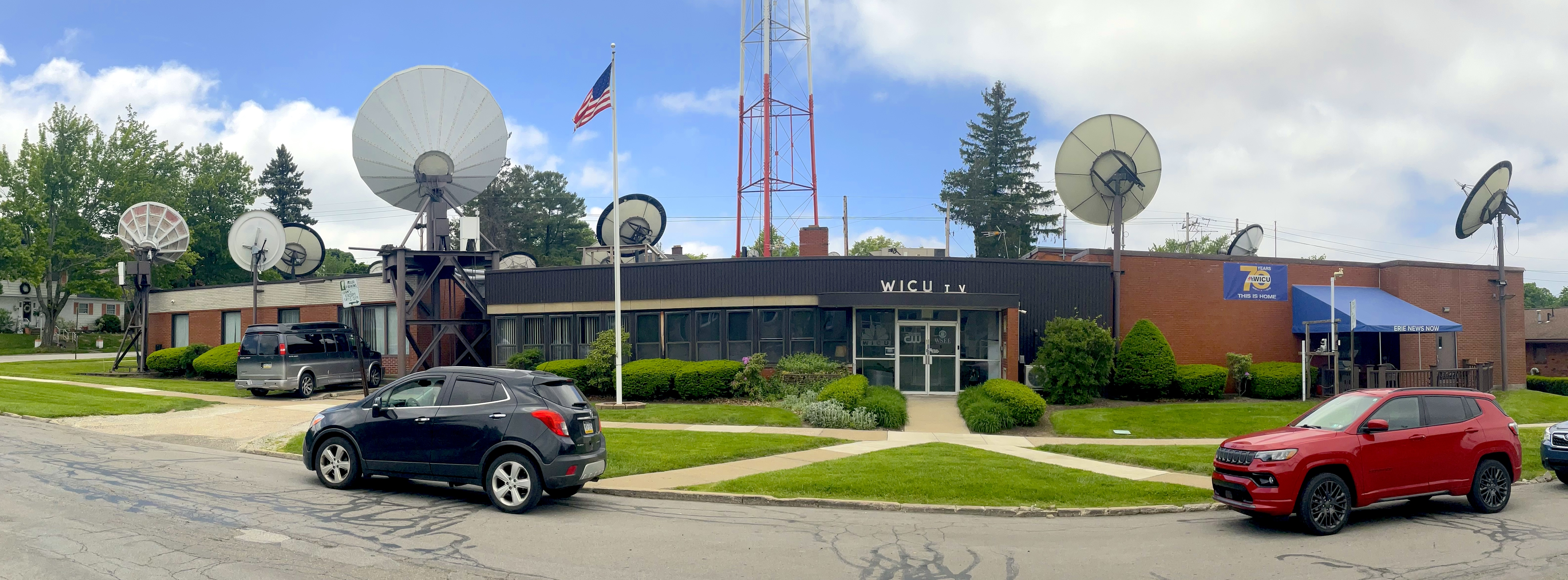
- WSEE-TV has been based out of WICU's facility since the summer of 2009.
- Erie, Pennsylvania; United States
- Channels: Digital: 21 (UHF); Virtual: 35
- Branding: WSEE; Erie News Now

Programming
- Affiliations: 35.1: CBS; for others, see § Subchannels

Ownership
- Owner: Lilly Broadcasting; (Lilly Broadcasting of Pennsylvania, LLC)
- Sister stations: WICU-TV, WENY-TV

History
- First air date: April 24, 1954
- Former call signs: WSEE (1954–1981)
- Former channel numbers: Analog: 35 (UHF, 1954–2009); Digital: 16 (UHF, until 2018)
- Former affiliations: Both secondary: ABC (1954–1966); UPN (2005–2006); The CW Plus (35.2, until 2025)
- Call sign meaning: "See" alludes to CBS eye logo

Technical information
- Licensing authority: FCC
- Facility ID: 49711
- ERP: 96 kW
- HAAT: 296 m (971 ft)
- Transmitter coordinates: 42°2′16″N 80°3′43″W

Links
- Public license information: Public file; LMS
- Website: www.erienewsnow.com

WSEE-TV (channel 35) is a television station in Erie, Pennsylvania, United States, affiliated with CBS. It is the flagship television property of locally based Lilly Broadcasting, and is a sister station to NBC affiliate WICU-TV (channel 12), to which Lilly provides certain services under a local marketing agreement (LMA) with SJL Broadcasting. The two stations share studios on State Street in downtown Erie; WSEE-TV's transmitter is located on Peach Street in Summit Township, Pennsylvania.

WSEE-TV's over-the-air digital broadcast signal covers Erie, Warren, and Crawford counties in Pennsylvania; reaches east to Jamestown, New York, west to Ashtabula, Ohio, north to London and Hamilton in Ontario, Canada, and south to Clarion, Pennsylvania. The station can be seen via satellite in North America and the Caribbean through C band. It is available in Puerto Rico via Liberty Puerto Rico as well as part of the locals package on DirecTV and Dish Network.

== History ==
WSEE began broadcasting on April 24, 1954. The station was originally owned by the Mead family, publishers of the Erie Times-News. ABC programming was shared by WSEE and WICU-TV until WJET-TV signed-on in 1966. The Meads sold the station to Gillett Broadcasting in 1978. In 1981, the "-TV" suffix was added to the WSEE calls. Gillett then sold the station to SCS Communications in 1982. In 1988, SCS sold WSEE to Price Communications. Price sold WSEE along with three of its stations (WAPT in Jackson, Mississippi; WZZM in Grand Rapids, Michigan; and WNAC-TV in Providence, Rhode Island) to Northstar Television Group in 1989.

In 2002, WICU-TV entered into a local marketing agreement with WSEE-TV. From that point until June 1, 2009, the station continued to operate from studios on Peach Street/US 19 in Downtown Erie. On that date, WSEE-TV merged into WICU-TV's facilities on State Street.

WSEE served as Erie's UPN affiliate on a secondary basis in 2005 and 2006, carrying select network programming on weekends. The station planned to launch a full-time UPN affiliate on a digital subchannel in the fall of 2006, replacing cable carriage of WUAB from Cleveland, before the network's merger with The WB to create The CW; WSEE obtained the Erie rights to the new network that May. The CW remained on a WSEE subchannel until September 1, 2025, when network majority owner Nexstar Media Group moved the affiliation to a subchannel of its WJET-TV.

WSEE has been digital-only since February 17, 2009. Until 2017, WSEE-TV was simulcast in standard definition on WICU-TV's third digital subchannel on virtual channel 12.3 from its separate transmitter in Greene Township; this was dropped on May 29, 2017, in favor of Ion Television. An upgraded multiplexer allowed the restoration of the WSEE simulcast to WICU on January 24, 2018, this time on 12.4, in 720p high definition; it was dropped again in March 2019 in favor of Start TV.

== News operation ==
Although the local marketing agreement between WSEE-TV and WICU-TV was established in 2002, the actual beginning of newscast consolidation between the two did not start until WSEE-TV actually moved into WICU's studios. WSEE-TV aired the final newscast from its separate Peach Street studios on May 28, 2009. With the challenges of moving, this station went without local news for nearly four days while technical and logistical arrangements were finalized.

When it resumed broadcasts, WSEE-TV's weeknight news at 11 p.m. was recorded while it broadcast live on WSEE-DT2 at 10 p.m.

After WSEE-TV moved its operations into the State Street facility, the existing studio set was split in two, allowing each station's newscast to look unique.

For one year starting in March 2009, a special feed of WSEE-DT2 (incorrectly identified on-air as "WBEP-DT2 Northwest Pennsylvania CW") was aired in the portions of Cattaraugus County, New York, served by Atlantic Broadband. This special feed replaced the first run of the prime time news at 10 p.m. with a replay of WICU-TV's weeknight show seen earlier at 6 p.m. The practice was performed to compensate for the fact that WICU-TV is not seen on Atlantic Broadband (whereas WSEE-TV and WSEE-DT2 both are). Without explanation, "WBEP-DT2" was discontinued in March 2010, and Cattaraugus County viewers began receiving the same WSEE-DT2 feed as viewers in Pennsylvania including the WSEE-TV-produced 10 p.m. newscast.

Originally, WSEE-TV's sixty-minute weekday morning show Mornings Live was recorded at 4 a.m. and then aired in the 6 o'clock a.m. hour. It retained the show's branding (as made obvious by the lack of current conditions during weather forecasts) despite the actual operation. During the 2012–13 season, following the national trend toward 4 a.m. newscasts, Mornings Live was actually seen "live" from 4 to 5 a.m. on WSEE-DT2 in addition to being taped for its later showing on WSEE-TV.

Until January 2013, this station's weeknight news at 6 p.m. was usually recorded during the mid-afternoon. The studios were unable to air two live broadcasts at the same time until a second high-definition production control room was added. Sister station WICU-TV airs a midday show weekdays at 12:30 p.m. following WSEE-TV's long-running noon newscast. On weekends, the two stations jointly produce local news at 6 and 11 p.m. These shows are known as Weekends Now. The WSEE-TV news department also produces a weekly public affairs program The Insider, which airs weekends Sunday morning on WSEE-TV.

During the week, WSEE-TV and WICU-TV maintain talent for news and sports that generally appear on one station. Most video footage and content is shared, coming from the same newsroom. In cases of breaking news, severe weather, or election coverage, the two simulcast newscasts and occasionally include the CW subchannel as well. On weekday mornings, WSEE-DT2 provides a simulcast of the first hour of WICU's 12 News Today at 5 p.m. and the NBC affiliate's midday show at 12:30 p.m.. It also aired the nationally syndicated broadcast The Daily Buzz from 6 to 9 p.m. with other CW Plus stations.

Along with their sister station WICU-TV, WSEE-TV upgraded newscasts to high definition in November 2012. The Newswatch branding was dropped after 28 years to coincide with the switch. WSEE's newscasts were rebranded as SEE News.

In September 2015, Lilly Broadcasting announced that WICU-TV and WSEE-TV would no longer produce separate morning and evening newscasts as of October 12; the two stations now simulcast newscasts in these time periods. The stations' executive vice president, John Christianson, said that the WICU and WSEE newscasts were seen by viewers to have been essentially the same newscast with different anchors.

WSEE signed a shared services agreement with Jamestown, New York–based The WNY Media Company (doing business as WNY News Now) in July 2021.

=== Notable former staff ===
- Al Benedict – news anchor
- Micah Johnson – reporter and news anchor (1984–1985)
- Lloyd Newell – primary news anchor (1984–1986)
- Dave Price – reporter (1997)
- Steve Scully
- John Stehr – news anchor and reporter (1980)

== Subchannels ==
The station's signal is multiplexed:

Subchannels of WSEE-TV
Channel	Res.	Short name	Programming
35.1	1080i	WSEE-DT	CBS
35.2	720p	ENN+	Erie News Now Plus
35.3	480i	ENN+	Erie News Now Plus
35.4	480i	H&I	Heroes & Icons
35.6	480i	ION +	Ion Plus

In June 2025, Erie News Now announced an agreement to air 10 Erie SeaWolves minor league baseball games on Erie News Now Plus.

== Out-of-market coverage ==
WSEE-TV is available on some cable systems in Canada that serve communities on Lake Erie. Atlantic Broadband, the cable provider that serves McKean County, Pennsylvania, and portions of Cattaraugus County, New York, announced that WSEE-TV would replace Buffalo's WIVB-TV. Though an agreement was eventually reached with WIVB-TV, WSEE-TV was kept on the Atlantic Broadband lineups. However, Time Warner Cable announced it would remove WSEE-TV (along with WICU-TV) from its cable lineups in Westfield and Dunkirk, New York, in favor of CFTO-TV from Toronto and YNN Buffalo. Atlantic Broadband, by this point renamed Breezeline, quietly dropped WSEE-TV from its New York systems in 2024.

WSEE is also available on cable and over-the-air in portions of Ashtabula County, Ohio, which is part of the Cleveland market despite much of the county being located geographically closer to either the Erie or Youngstown markets.

WSEE-TV became available via the Primetime 24 package on October 1, 1997, when it replaced Raleigh's WRAL-TV (now an NBC affiliate) due to that station's regular preemptions of CBS programming. The service provides American network television service to C band satellite and some cable viewers in Latin America, the Caribbean, and in rural parts of the United States where local signals are not available. This feed of WSEE-TV, which is carried on all three cable providers in Puerto Rico, varies from its local one where local commercials are replaced with ads directed towards the Caribbean. The station's local newscasts and some syndicated shows are sometimes replaced with infomercials, although there is a taped Caribbean weather forecast by WSEE-TV's weather staff nightly at 11, available through a WSEE-TV-managed website specific to Caribbean weather and is branded as "One Caribbean Weather". On November 19, 2019, Lilly completed the purchase of WCVI-TV in the U.S. Virgin Islands from Family Broadcasting Corporation (which already carried a modified feed of sister ABC affiliate WENY-TV from Elmira, New York, on their second digital subchannel under a lease agreement), adding the modified WSEE feed to that station's main feed the next day to allow it over-the-air coverage in the region.

== See also ==
- Channel 21 digital TV stations in the United States
- Channel 35 virtual TV stations in the United States
