= WICU-TV =

Television station in Erie, Pennsylvania

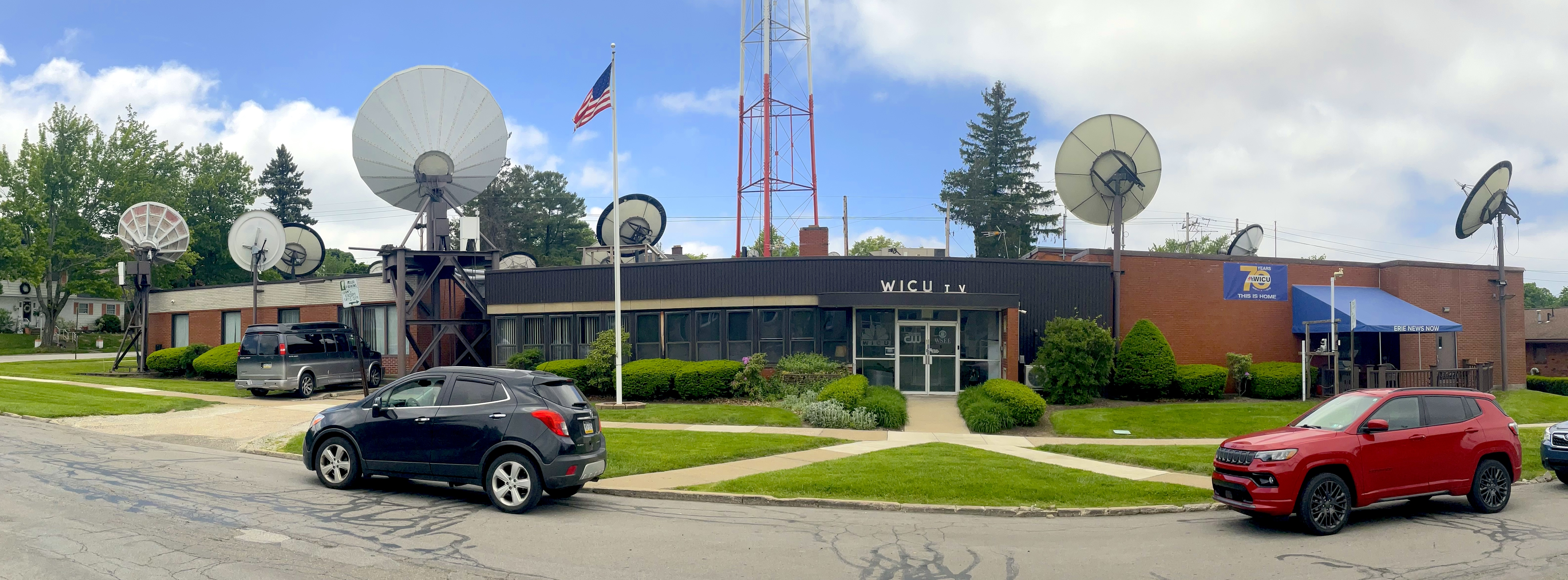
- WICU-TV's longtime facility on State Street south of downtown Erie, which also includes the headquarters of Lilly Broadcasting itself.
- Erie, Pennsylvania; United States
- Channels: Digital: 12 (VHF); Virtual: 12
- Branding: WICU-TV; Erie News Now; MeTV Erie (on 12.2)

Programming
- Affiliations: 12.1: NBC; for others, see § Subchannels

Ownership
- Owner: SJL Broadcasting; (SJL of Pennsylvania, Inc.)
- Operator: Lilly Broadcasting via LMA
- Sister stations: WSEE-TV

History
- Founded: March 17, 1948
- First air date: March 15, 1949
- Former channel numbers: Analog: 12 (VHF, 1949–2009); Digital: 52 (UHF, 2002–2009)
- Former affiliations: CBS (secondary, 1949–1954); DuMont (secondary, 1949–1955); ABC (secondary 1949–1961 and 1963–1966, primary 1961–1963)
- Call sign meaning: "ICU" sounds like "I see you"

Technical information
- Licensing authority: FCC
- Facility ID: 24970
- ERP: 6.8 kW
- HAAT: 289 m (948 ft)
- Transmitter coordinates: 42°2′16″N 80°3′43″W
- Translator(s): WEPA-LD 19 Erie; WXTM-LD 18 Erie

Links
- Public license information: Public file; LMS
- Website: www.erienewsnow.com

WICU-TV (channel 12) is a television station in Erie, Pennsylvania, United States, affiliated with NBC. It is owned by SJL Broadcasting, which maintains a local marketing agreement (LMA) with Lilly Broadcasting, owner of CBS affiliate and company flagship WSEE-TV (channel 35), for the provision of certain services. The two stations share studios on State Street in downtown Erie; WICU-TV's transmitter is located on Peach Street in Summit Township, Pennsylvania.

WICU-TV's broadcast signal reaches the city of Erie, surrounding communities, and across Lake Erie in parts of Ontario, Canada. It is available on all cable systems in Erie, Warren and Crawford counties in Pennsylvania, and select providers in Venango County, Pennsylvania, southwestern New York State, and northeastern Ohio which are part of the Pittsburgh, Buffalo, Cleveland, and Youngstown markets respectively. As recently as the 1990s, it was available on cable as far east as Olean, New York (well out of WICU's broadcast range and in competition with Buffalo NBC affiliate WGRZ).

== History ==
WICU-TV began broadcasting in Erie on March 15, 1949, as an affiliate of all four networks of the time (NBC, CBS, ABC, and DuMont). It was one of the last stations to be granted a construction permit before the Federal Communications Commission (FCC) froze new applications. Channel 12 was founded by Edward Lamb, an attorney from Toledo, Ohio who also owned the now-defunct Erie Dispatch-Herald, and other broadcast properties including WTVN-TV (now WSYX) in Columbus, Ohio, which went on the air six months later. In 1952, Lamb purchased WIKK radio (1330 AM, later WICU and now WFNN), giving channel 12 a sister station on radio.

WICU-TV held a monopoly on Erie television until WSEE signed-on in 1954 as a CBS affiliate. The two stations, then separately owned, shared ABC programs until May 1961, when channel 12 switched its main network alliance to ABC and relegated NBC to a secondary affiliation with WSEE. Two years later, in May 1963, WICU reversed itself and returned to NBC as its primary network. ABC was again split between channels 12 and 35 until WJET-TV (channel 24) signed-on in April 1966 as Erie's exclusive ABC outlet.

The station was a major beneficiary of a quirk in the FCC's plan for allocating stations. In the early days of broadcast television, there were twelve VHF channels available and 69 UHF channels (later reduced to 55 in 1983). The VHF bands were more desirable because they carried longer distances and, because most televisions did not carry UHF tuners until being forced to by the All-Channel Receiver Act in the 1960s, VHF receivers were more accessible. Since there were only twelve VHF channels available, there were limitations as to how closely the stations could be spaced.

After the FCC's Sixth Report and Order ended the license freeze and opened the UHF band in 1952, it devised a plan for allocating VHF licenses. Under this plan, almost all of the country would be able to receive two commercial VHF channels plus one non-commercial channel. Most of the rest of the country ("1/2") would be able to receive a third VHF channel. Other areas would be designated as "UHF islands" since they were too close to larger cities for VHF service. The "2" networks became CBS and NBC, "+1" represented non-commercial educational stations, and "1/2" became ABC (which was the weakest network usually winding up with the UHF allocation where no VHF was available).

However, Erie was sandwiched between Pittsburgh (channels 2, 4, 11 and 13) to the south, Wheeling–Steubenville (channels 7 and 9) to the southwest, Cleveland (channels 3, 5 and 8) to the west, State College (channels 3, 6, and 10, later 8) to the southeast, Buffalo (channels 2, 4 and 7) to the northeast, and London, Ontario (channel 10), to the north. This created a large "doughnut" in Northwestern Pennsylvania where there could only be one VHF license. WICU-TV was fortunate to gain that license, and as a result was the market leader in Erie for most of its history.

Edward Lamb nearly lost WIKK (renamed WICU [AM] in 1957) and WICU-TV in 1954 due to allegations that he associated with Communists, but was exonerated in 1957. A decade later, in August 1967, Lamb reorganized his business interests, selling off all non-broadcast holdings as well as WICU radio. Lamb's company, later renamed Great Lakes Communications, continued to hold channel 12. After Lamb's death in 1987, his family continued to own the station until 1996, when it was sold to SJL Communications, a subsidiary of SJL Broadcast Management and Alta Management. SJL purchased Alta's interest in 2005. (Note: Note that SJL has obvious links to Montecito Broadcast Group, but URLs for Montecito no longer function. See SJL Host to see linkage and lack of function of Montecito URL.) A consummation notice was filed with the FCC in February 2007 to voluntarily transfer control of the station from SJL Communications to SJL Broadcast Management Corporation. This transaction was then authorized by the FCC.

In 2002, the station became the senior partner in a local marketing agreement with WSEE-TV. From that point until June 1, 2009, WSEE-TV continued to operate from its own studios on Peach Street in Downtown Erie. On that date, that station along with its CW subchannel merged into WICU-TV's facilities. WICU's broadcasts became digital-only, effective June 12, 2009, the day all television stations transitioned from analog to digital broadcasts under federal mandate. It was the last analog station serving the Erie region to make the switch.

WICU-TV has aired an annual telethon for the Kanzius Cancer Research Foundation since 2008.

WICU-TV and WSEE-TV merged their websites in June 2011.

In October 2023, WICU-TV began airing its programming on two low-power UHF translators; WXTM-LD and WEPA-LD.

== News operation ==
Although the local marketing agreement between WICU-TV and WSEE-TV was established in 2002, the actual beginning of newscast consolidation between the two did not start until WSEE-TV actually moved into WICU-TV's studios. WSEE-TV aired the final newscast from its separate Peach Street studios on May 28, 2009.

WSEE-TV's weeknight show at 11 moved to its CW-affiliated subchannel so it would no longer directly compete with WICU-TV's newscast. The program in its new time slot now began to air against another prime time newscast seen for an hour on Fox affiliate WFXP (channel 66).

In November 2012, Lilly Broadcasting invested close to a million dollars to build the first HD local news studios with WICU-TV and WSEE-TV. Both WICU-TV and WSEE-TV gather news in the field in full HD and present the news in the same high definition format.

WICU-TV airs a midday show during the week at 12:30 as opposed to noon in order for WSEE to offer a live newscast in the traditional time slot. On weekends, the two television stations jointly produce local news at 11 p.m. while WICU-TV only provides an early evening broadcast at 6 p.m. on Saturdays and Sundays. These shows are known as Weekends Now and can be delayed or preempted on one station due to network obligations.

During the week, WICU-TV and WSEE-TV maintain primary personnel such as news and sports anchors that only appear on one station. Most video footage and content is shared, however. In cases of breaking news, severe weather, or election coverage the two simulcast newscasts and occasionally include the CW subchannel as well. On weekday mornings, WSEE-DT2 provides a simulcast of the first hour of 12 News Today at 5 a.m. and WICU-TV's midday show at 12:30 p.m.

In September 2015, Lilly Broadcasting announced that WICU-TV and WSEE-TV would no longer produce separate morning and evening newscasts as of October 12; the two stations will instead simulcast newscasts in these time periods under the joint brand Erie News Now. The stations' executive vice president, John Christianson, said that the WICU and WSEE newscasts were seen by viewers to have been essentially the same newscast with different anchors.

WICU signed a shared service agreement with The WNY Media Company to share news resources with the Jamestown, New York-based Internet newscast, WNY News Now, in July 2021.

== Subchannels ==
The station's signal is multiplexed:

Subchannels of WICU-TV
Channel	Res.	Short name	Programming
12.1	1080i	WICU HD	NBC
12.2	480i	MeTV	MeTV
12.3	480i	ION	Ion
12.4	480i	STARTTV	Start TV
