= Ashtabula, Ohio =

City in Ohio, US

- City
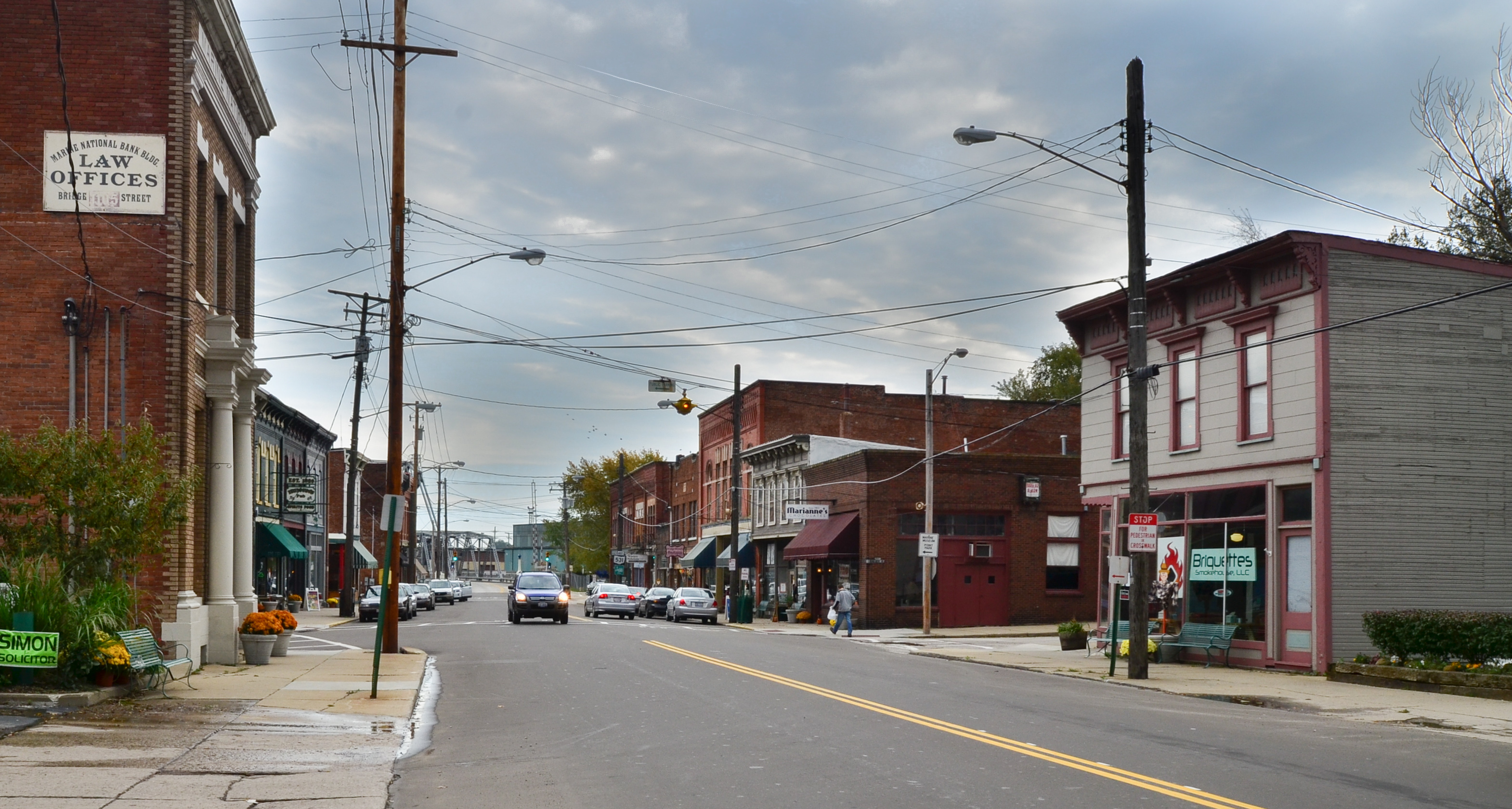
- Bridge Street in Ashtabula Harbor

- Seal
- Nicknames: Bula, 'Bula
- Interactive map of Ashtabula, Ohio
- Location within Ohio Location within the United States
- Coordinates: 41°52′28″N 80°47′45″W
- Country: United States
- State: Ohio
- County: Ashtabula
- Townships: Ashtabula, Saybrook

Government
  - Type: Council-manager

Area
  - Total: 7.93 sq mi (20.53 km^{2})
  - Land: 7.76 sq mi (20.11 km^{2})
  - Water: 0.16 sq mi (0.41 km^{2})
- Elevation: 640 ft (200 m)

Population (2020)
  - Total: 17,975
  - Estimate (2023): 17,785
  - Density: 2,314.6/sq mi (893.67/km^{2})
- Time zone: UTC-5 (Eastern (EST))
  - Summer (DST): UTC-4 (EDT)
- ZIP Codes: 44004 & 44005
- Area code: 440
- FIPS code: 39-02638
- GNIS feature ID: 2394002
- Website: cityofashtabula.com

Ashtabula (/ˌæʃtəˈbjuːlə/ ASH-tə-BYU-lə) is the most populous city in Ashtabula County, Ohio, United States. It lies at the mouth of the Ashtabula River on to Lake Erie, 53 miles (85 km) northeast of Cleveland. The city had 17,975 people at the 2020 census. Like many other cities in the Rust Belt, it has lost population because of a decline in industrial jobs since the 1960s. It is part of the Cleveland metropolitan area.

In the middle of the 19th century, the city was an important destination on the Underground Railroad as refugee slaves took ships across Lake Erie to Canada. In the late 19th century, the city became a major coal port on Lake Erie. Coal and iron were shipped here, the latter from the Mesabi Range in Minnesota. The city attracted immigrants from Finland, Sweden, and Italy in the industrial period. Ashtabula hosts an annual Blessing of the Fleet Celebration, usually in late May or early June. As part of the celebration, a religious procession and prayer service is held at Ashtabula Harbor. The city was the site of the FinnFestUSA in 2007, a celebration of Finnish Americans.

== History ==
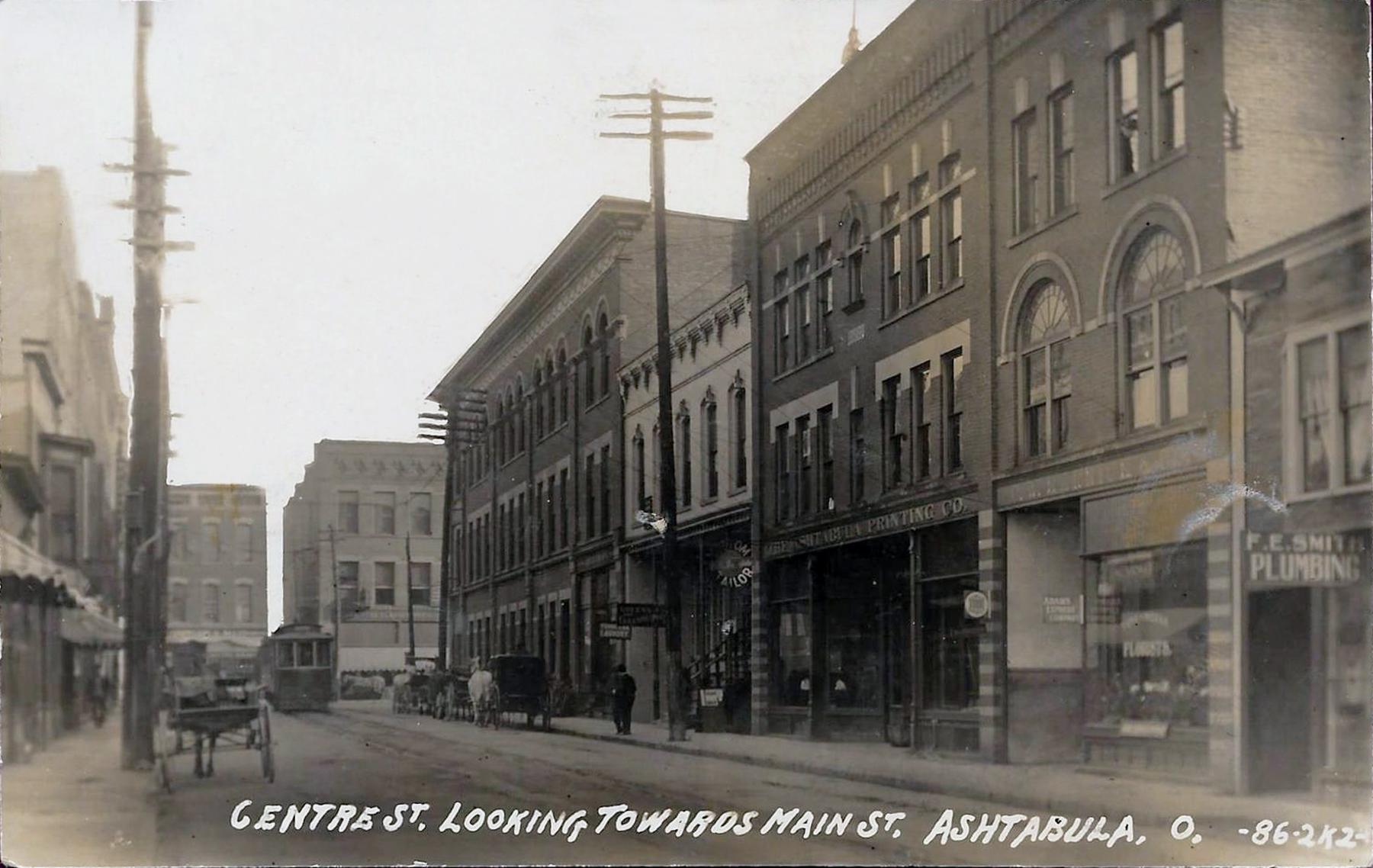
Center Street, 1915

This area had long been inhabited by indigenous peoples. After the American Revolutionary War, the United States mounted the Northwest Indian War to push Native American peoples out of what it then called the Northwest - the area of the Midwest south of the Great Lakes and west of the Appalachian Mountains. The success of this military effort resulted in more European Americans entering Ohio and nearby territories.

The site of Ashtabula was settled by such European Americans beginning in 1803. The city was incorporated in 1891. Located directly on Lake Erie and developed as a port for trade, the city contained several stops on the Underground Railroad. This informal, secret system was the means by which anti-slavery supporters helped escaped African-American slaves reach freedom in Canada in the years before the American Civil War. While Ohio was a free state, many refugee slaves still felt at risk of slavecatchers here, particularly after the Fugitive Slave Law of 1850 was passed. It required enforcement and cooperation by residents of free states to return escaped slaves and was biased toward slavecatchers, requiring little documentation of their claims. Among the Underground Railroad sites in Ashtabula is Hubbard House, one of the handful of former surviving termination points. Refugee slaves stayed in a basement of the house adjacent to the lake and then left on the next safe boat to Canada, gaining their freedom once they arrived in Ontario. The house is listed on the National Register of Historic Places.

The city's harbor has been important as a large ore and coal port since the end of the 19th century, and integral to the steel manufacturing that was developed around the Great Lakes. Lake steamers and barges, built at shipyards along the Great Lakes and setting new records for size and tonnage, delivered cargoes of iron ore from the Mesabi Range in Minnesota. This continues as a coal port; a long coal ramp is visible in the harbor. Ore shipments are unloaded from 'lakers' (Great Lakes freighters) and shipped to surviving steel mills in Pennsylvania. Industrial jobs have declined since the late 20th century with much steel manufacturing moved offshore.

An electric street railroad was built by Captain John N. Stuart in 1883. However, in July 1890, the city council dispossessed him of the street railroad and associated franchises via a disputable court decision. Shortly after, 600–700 men started to tear up and remove the tracks under the cover of darkness.

Many European immigrants, particularly from Finland, Sweden, and Italy, were attracted to the industrial jobs in Ashtabula in the late 19th and early 20th centuries, as they could learn and accomplish tasks without having a great command of English. Ethnic rivalries among these groups were once a major influence on politics and daily life in Ashtabula.

In 1915, Ashtabula became the first city in the United States to adopt a form of voting called proportional representation (PR). This was an addition to the council-manager charter, originally passed in 1914, and served as a model for the National Municipal League. Twenty-four more cities would go on to use this single-transferable-vote (STV) PR system, with five in total in Ohio. Ethnic rivalries were one reason for the city's switch, as STV enabled minorities to win political office. Another factor was disunity in the incumbent Republican Party. Voters repealed the system in 1929, using it for the last time in 1931. Despite two failed repeal campaigns in 1920 and 1926, political bosses and parties that lost power under STV eventually restored plurality voting, otherwise known as 'winner take all.'

A substantial percentage of the current residents are descended from those early 20th-century immigrants. The population in the City of Ashtabula grew steadily until 1970 but has declined in recent years due to industrial restructuring and loss of jobs. Since the late 20th century, the city has become a destination for Hispanic or Latino immigrants, who by the 2010 census made up 9.3% of the population. (See 'Demographics' section below.)

=== Tragedies ===
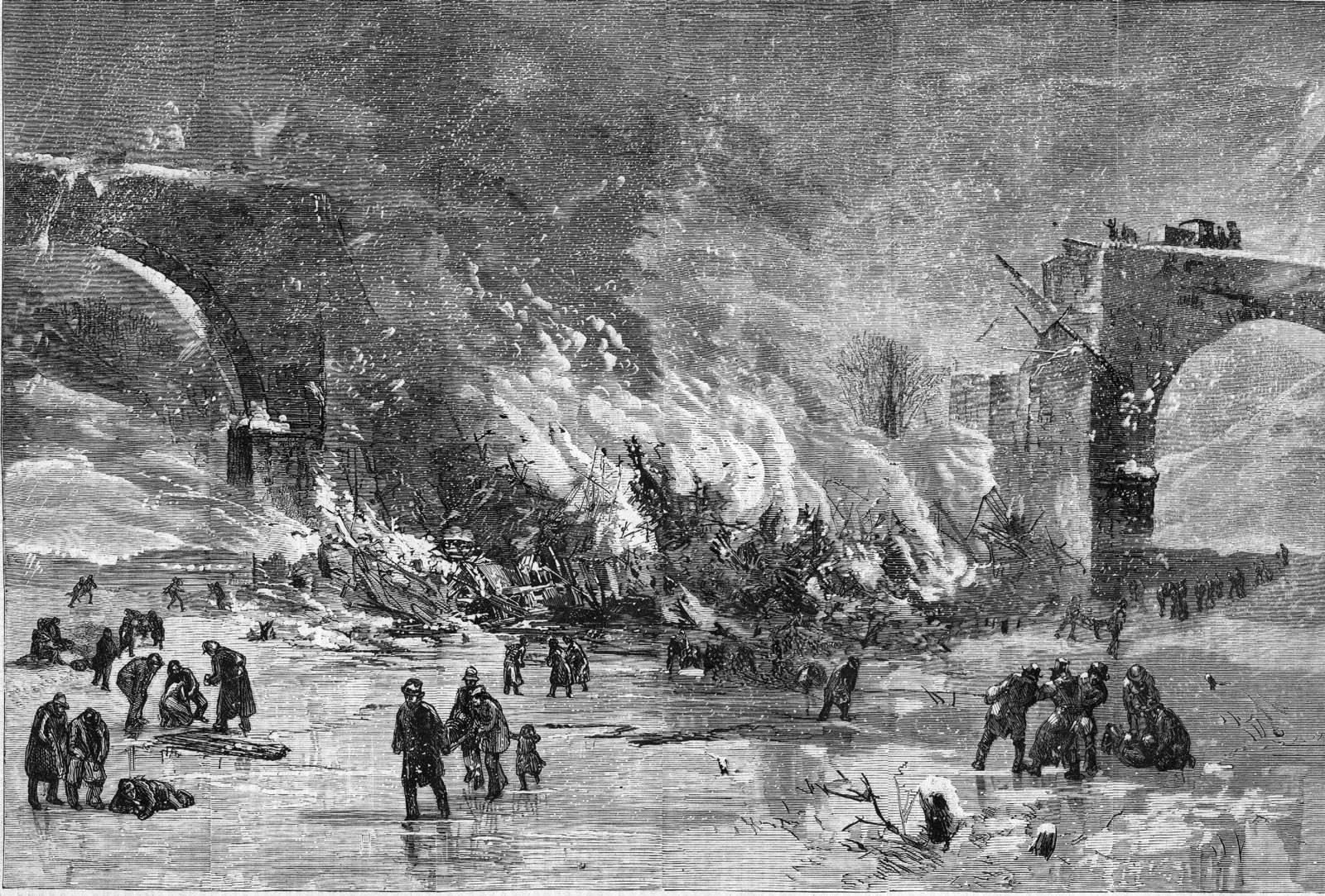
Depiction of the 1876 Ashtabula River railroad disaster

Construction of railroads connected Ashtabula to a national network that contributed to its success as a port. On December 29, 1876, one of the nation's most notorious rail accidents occurred, known as the Ashtabula River railroad disaster, Ashtabula Horror, or Ashtabula bridge disaster. As Lake Shore and Michigan Southern Railway Train No. 5, The Pacific Express, crossed the Ashtabula River bridge, the Howe truss structure collapsed, dropping the second locomotive and 11 passenger cars into the frozen creek 150 feet (46 m) below. A fire was started by the car stoves, and of the 159 people on board, 92 were killed and 64 were injured.

A rail ferry, also named Ashtabula, used to run from Ashtabula to Port Burwell, Ontario. The ferry was launched in 1906 and operated successfully for many decades. It collided with the steamer SS Ben Morell in September 1959, causing the ferry to sink.

On August 10, 1958, a natural gas leak was ignited by electrical equipment or lighting in neighboring Andover, Ohio. The resulting explosion destroyed a restaurant and five other buildings. 21 people were killed, and 15 injured.

== Geography ==
According to the 2010 census, the city has a total area of 7.91 square miles (20.5 km^{2}), of which 7.74 square miles (20.0 km^{2}) (or 97.85%) is land and 0.17 square miles (0.44 km^{2}) (or 2.15%) is water.

Ashtabula is bordered by Lake Erie to the north and has a prominent harbor where the Ashtabula River flows into the lake. The Ashtabula Harbor was a primary coal harbor and still serves to ship. It has two public beaches: Walnut Beach, near the harbor, and Lake Shore Park, originally a Public Works Administration project during the Great Depression, on the opposite side of the harbor.

Part of the city lies in Ashtabula Township, and part lies in Saybrook Township.

The Ashtabula area receives a considerable amount of snow throughout the winter, with the average snowfall being 68 inches (173 cm). Much of the snow comes from lake-effect snow bands from the Great Lakes.

=== Major highways ===
- US 20
- SR 11
- SR 46
- SR 84
- SR 531

== Demographics ==
Historical population
Census	Pop.	Note	%±
1830	229		—
1840	704		207.4%
1850	821		16.6%
1860	1,418		72.7%
1870	1,999		41.0%
1880	4,445		122.4%
1890	8,338		87.6%
1900	12,949		55.3%
1910	18,266		41.1%
1920	22,082		20.9%
1930	23,301		5.5%
1940	21,405		−8.1%
1950	23,696		10.7%
1960	24,559		3.6%
1970	24,313		−1.0%
1980	23,354		−3.9%
1990	21,633		−7.4%
2000	20,962		−3.1%
2010	19,124		−8.8%
2020	17,975		−6.0%
2023 (est.)	17,785		−1.1%
U.S. Decennial Census

=== 2020 census ===
As of the 2020 census, Ashtabula had a population of 17,975. The median age was 38.7 years. 24.3% of residents were under the age of 18 and 17.5% of residents were 65 years of age or older. For every 100 females there were 92.7 males, and for every 100 females age 18 and over there were 88.8 males age 18 and over.

100.0% of residents lived in urban areas, while 0% lived in rural areas.

There were 7,577 households in Ashtabula, of which 28.0% had children under the age of 18 living in them. Of all households, 29.2% were married-couple households, 22.7% were households with a male householder and no spouse or partner present, and 37.2% were households with a female householder and no spouse or partner present. About 36.8% of all households were made up of individuals and 14.8% had someone living alone who was 65 years of age or older.

There were 8,622 housing units, of which 12.1% were vacant. Among occupied housing units, 48.3% were owner-occupied and 51.7% were renter-occupied. The homeowner vacancy rate was 2.5% and the rental vacancy rate was 8.5%.

Racial composition as of the 2020 census
Race	Number	Percent
White	13,273	73.8%
Black or African American	1,608	8.9%
American Indian and Alaska Native	75	0.4%
Asian	49	0.3%
Native Hawaiian and Other Pacific Islander	3	<0.1%
Some other race	933	5.2%
Two or more races	2,034	11.3%
Hispanic or Latino (of any race)	2,234	12.4%

=== 2010 census ===
At the 2010 census there were 19,124 people in 7,746 households, including 4,724 families, in the city. The population density was 2,470.8 inhabitants per square mile (954.0/km^{2}). There were 9,087 housing units at an average density of 1,174.0 per square mile (453.3/km^{2}). The racial makeup of the city was 82.0% White, 8.9% African American, 0.4% Native American, 0.3% Asian, 3.3% from other races, and 5.0% from two or more races. Hispanic or Latino of any race were 9.3%.

Of the 7,746 households, 33.0% had children under the age of 18 living with them, 35.2% were married couples living together, 19.3% had a female householder with no husband present, 6.5% had a male householder with no wife present, and 39.0% were non-families. 32.9% of households were one person, and 13.3% were one person aged 65 or older. The average household size was 2.42 and the average family size was 3.03.

The median age was 37 years. 26.4% of residents were under the age of 18; 9.3% were between the ages of 18 and 24; 23.9% were from 25 to 44; 25.8% were from 45 to 64; and 14.7% were 65 or older. The gender makeup of the city was 47.6% male and 52.4% female.

=== 2000 census ===
At the 2000 census, there were 20,962 people in 8,435 households, including 5,423 families, in the city. The population density was 2,775.9 inhabitants per square mile (1,071.8/km^{2}). There were 9,151 housing units at an average density of 1,211.8 per square mile (467.9/km^{2}). The racial makeup of the city was 84.69% White, 9.79% African American, 0.29% Native American, 0.40% Asian, 0.05% Pacific Islander, 2.51% from other races, and 2.26% from two or more races. Hispanic or Latino of any race was 5.32% of the population. 16.5% identified as of Italian ancestry, 14.6% as German, 9.2% as American, 8.1% as Irish, and 8.1% as English, according to Census 2000. 93.1% spoke English and 5.4% Spanish as their first language.

Of the 8,435 households, 32.6% had children under the age of 18 living with them, 41.9% were married couples living together, 17.4% had a female householder with no husband present, and 35.7% were non-families. 30.6% of households were one person, and 13.3% were one person aged 65 or older. The average household size was 2.45 and the average family size was 3.03.

In the city the population was spread out, with 27.6% under the age of 18, 8.8% from 18 to 24, 28.1% from 25 to 44, 20.5% from 45 to 64, and 15.0% 65 or older. The median age was 35 years. For every 100 females, there were 88.1 males. For every 100 females age 18 and over, there were 83.3 males.

The median household income was $27,354 and the median family income was $33,454. Males had a median income of $28,436 versus $22,490 for females. The per capita income for the city was $14,034. About 17.8% of families and 21.4% of the population were below the poverty line, including 31.2% of those under age 18 and 13.6% of those age 65 or over.

== Education ==
The Ashtabula Area City School District serves Ashtabula (its high school is Lakeside High School). Kent State University at Ashtabula is located in the city, providing a local campus of this institution. As for private schools, Ashtabula or Saybrook is home to Saint John School, a K–12 school under the Diocese of Youngstown which has incorporated Ashtabula's previous parish schools and independent Catholic high school as one institution.

Ashtabula has two public libraries: the Harbor Topky Memorial Library, and a branch of the Ashtabula County District Library.

== Media ==
Ashtabula (and Ashtabula County) is served by both Cleveland and Erie radio markets as well as 12 full-power FM stations and 2 full-power AM stations.

Music stations include WREO (Soft adult contemporary), WFXJ-FM North Kingsville (Classic rock), WKKY Geneva (country), WYBL (country), WZOO-FM Edgewood (Classic hits), WWOW Conneaut (oldies) and WQGR North Madison (oldies).

NPR stations include W201DP (WYSU), WKSV Thompson (WKSU) and partially served by WQLN.

Religious stations include WMIH Geneva (Catholic), WCVJ Jefferson (Christian worship, Air1), WOHK (Christian contemporary, K-LOVE), WGOJ Conneaut (Christian talk and teaching), WVMU (Religious, Moody Radio, WCRF-FM), and partially served by WCCD Painesville (Urban gospel) and WCGV Cambridge Springs (Religious, Family Life Network). The only sports station serving the area is WFUN (ESPN). Similarly, WHWN in Painesville is the only Spanish language station partially serving the area.

Ashtabula's newspaper is the Star Beacon.

== Infrastructure ==
=== Airport ===
The Northeast Ohio Regional Airport is located eight nautical miles (9.2 mi; 15 km) southeast of Ashtabula's central business district.

=== Port ===
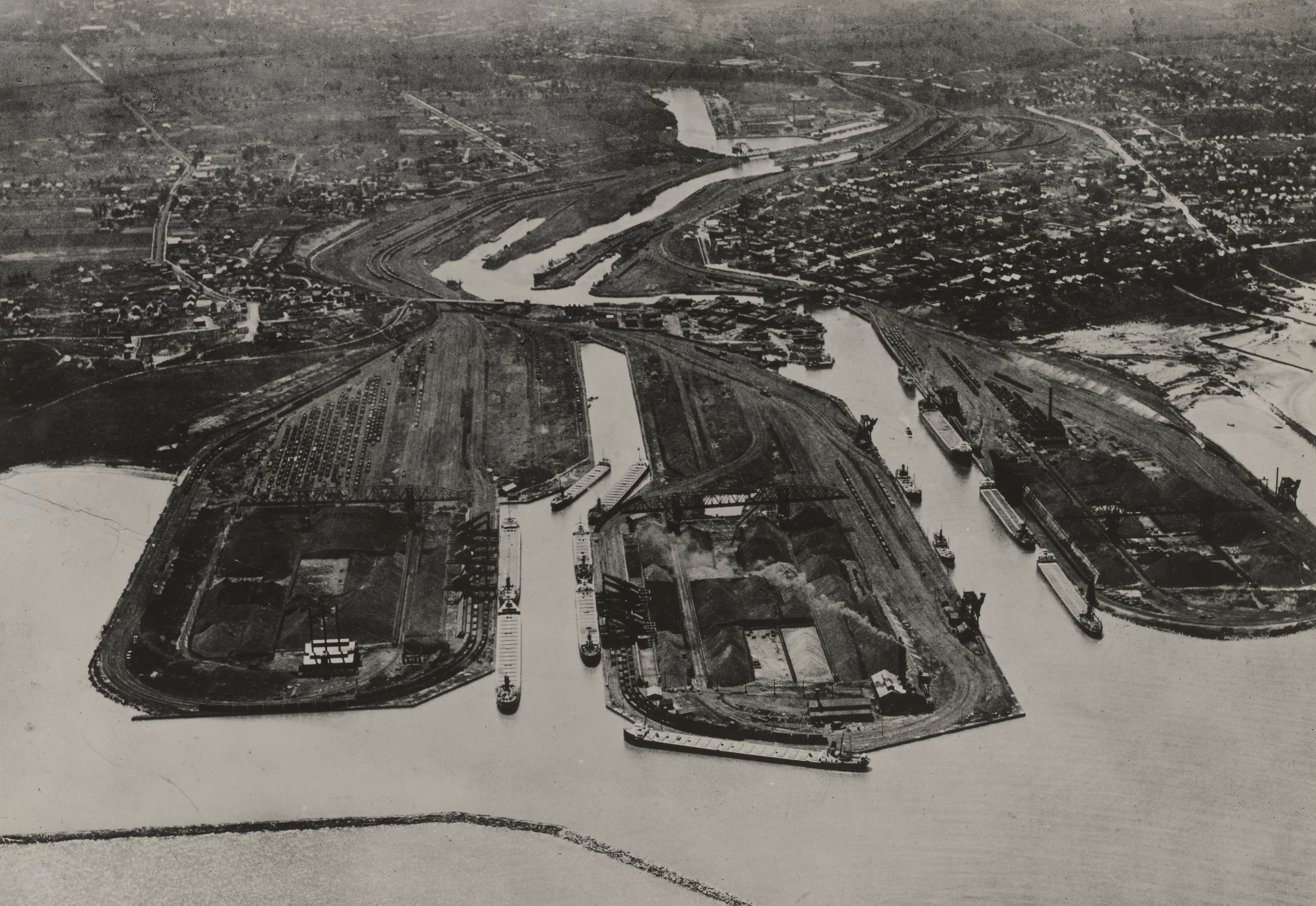
Aerial view of the Ashabula Coal Docks, 1941

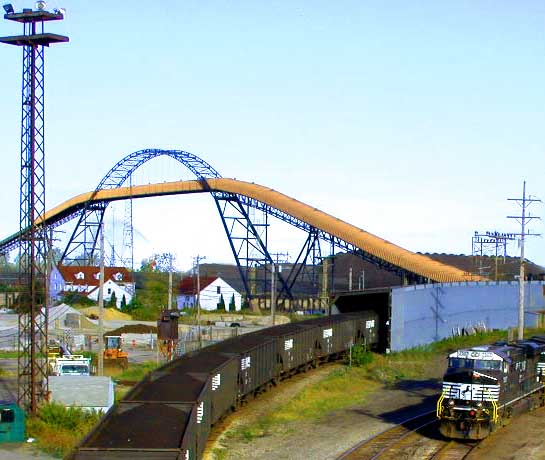
Railyard in the port of Ashtabula

In the 20th century Ashtabula developed rapidly as a major shipping and commercial center because of its access to Lake Erie and nearly 30 miles (48 km) of shoreline.

During the 1950s, the area experienced growth with an expanding chemical industry and increasing harbor activity, making Ashtabula one of the most important port cities of the Great Lakes. Other historical industries in the area included a Rockwell International plant on Route 20 on the western side of Ashtabula, which manufactured brakes for the Space Shuttle program, and the extrusion of depleted and enriched uranium at the Reactive Metals Extrusion plant on East 21st Street.

Due to such industrial uses, however, there was extensive environmental contamination. The Ashtabula River and harbor were designated as a significant Superfund site by the Environmental Protection Agency in the late 20th century. A multi-year process of environmental cleanup of toxic wastes and soils was needed; cleanup concluded with river dredging in 2012–2014.

Ashtabula Harbor hosts an annual 'Blessing of the Fleet' community festival. This Blessing of the Fleet began as a practice of priests for Catholic Portuguese and Irish fishermen and tugmen who had settled in Ashtabula. During the 1930s, the Blessing was a small, almost private affair in early April conducted by a few tugmen, their parish priest, and an acolyte, according to their traditions. It took place annually when the Great Lakes were free enough of ice to be open for regular traffic. By 1950, this event was held as a public ceremony under the auspices of Mother of Sorrows parish. In 1974, the Blessing of the Fleet became a community affair, with all of Ashtabula's religious and harbor community participating.

The United States Coast Guard Station and the Ashtabula Maritime & Surface Transportation Museum, located in the old lighthouse keepers home, help to preserve Ashtabula's maritime heritage.

Norfolk Southern used the port for one of its coal piers. The coal pier became idled in 2016 due to declining demand for coal.

=== Health care ===
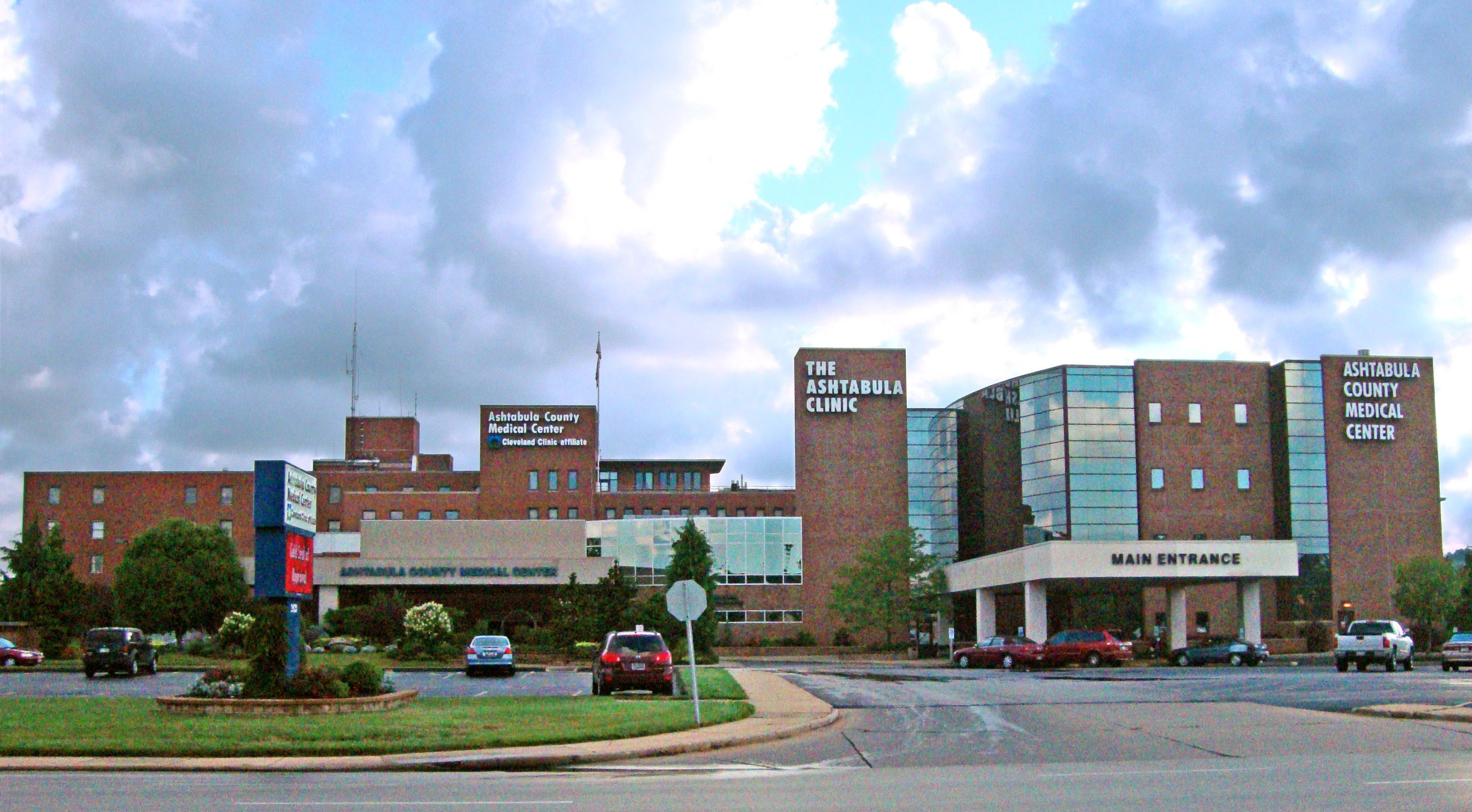
Ashtabula County Medical Center campus

Ashtabula County Medical Center (ACMC) is a multi-specialty hospital located in Ashtabula County, Ohio. ACMC serves the people of the county and the surrounding areas in northeastern Ohio. it is an affiliate of the Cleveland Clinic system.

The hospital operates the county's only behavioral medicine unit, and a sleep disorders lab, as well as many specialized services. The attached "Ashtabula Clinic" provides outpatient care in the specialties of pediatrics, internal medicine, family medicine, pulmonary, neurology, psychiatry, sleep disorders, cardiology, gastroenterology, ophthalmology, general surgery, orthopedics, urology, ENT, podiatry and oncology. ACMC operates satellite clinics in the county of Ashtabula. In December 2008, ACMC added the first Cardiac Catheterization Lab (commonly known as the Cath Lab) in Ashtabula County. ACMC provided OB/GYN care and maternity/birthing services in a newly renovated maternity unit, until the ACMC Board voted to discontinue deliveries in the maternity suite. The suite officially closed on August 1, 2020.

== In popular culture ==
During World War II, the United States Navy used the names of rivers with Indian origins for an entire class of fleet oilers, which are used to replenish vessels while underway at sea. USS Ashtabula (AO-51) was commissioned in 1943 and served until 1982. Ashtabula was awarded eight battle stars for World War II service, four battle stars for the Korean War, and eight battle stars for duty in the Vietnam War. Partially scrapped in 1995, Ashtabula was expended as a target in fleet exercises on October 15, 2000. She has been the only Navy vessel to bear the name Ashtabula.

The city is also referenced in Bob Dylan's 1975 album Blood on the Tracks, in the song "You're Gonna Make Me Lonesome When You Go".

== Gallery ==
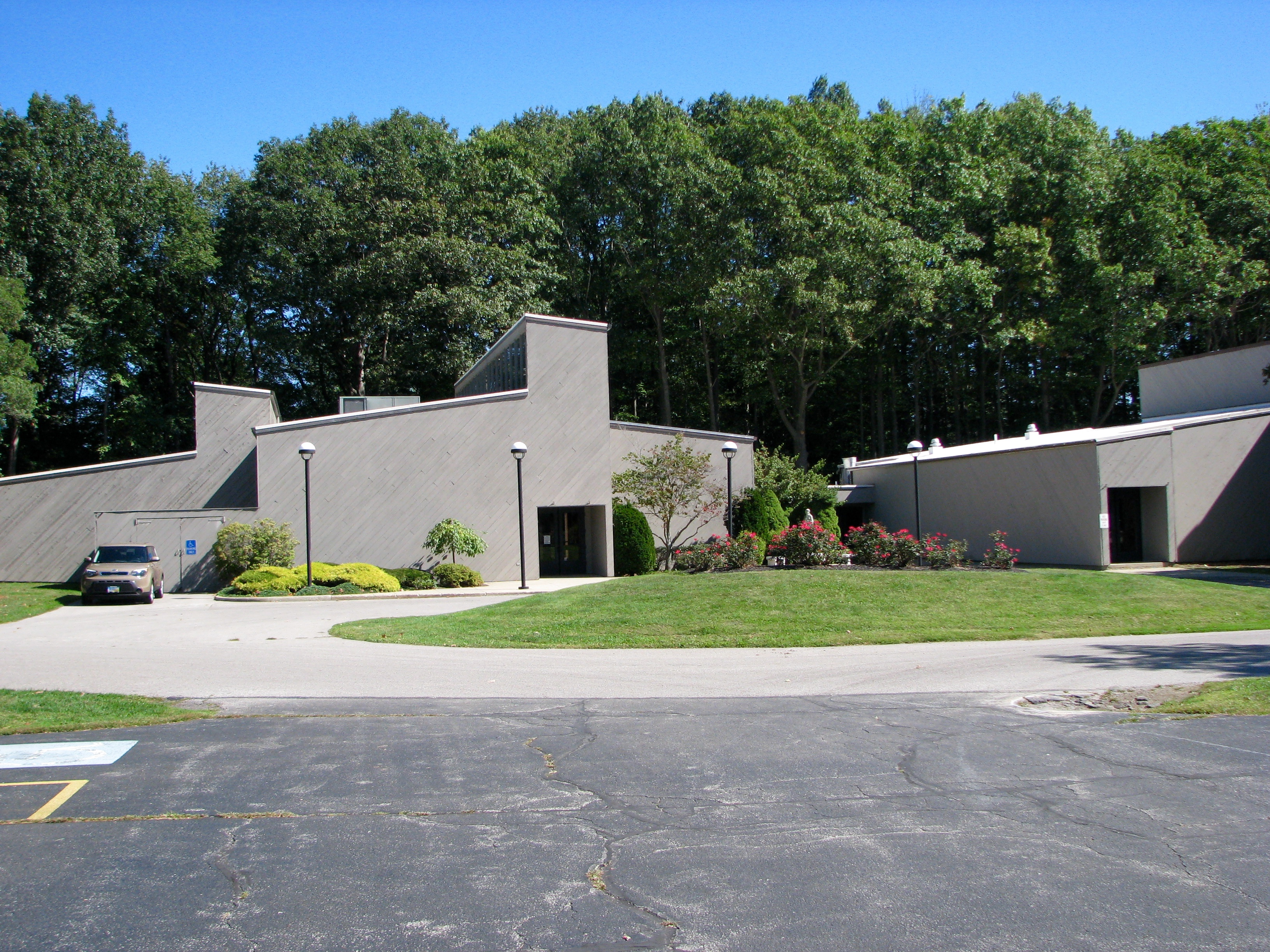
Ashtabula Arts Center

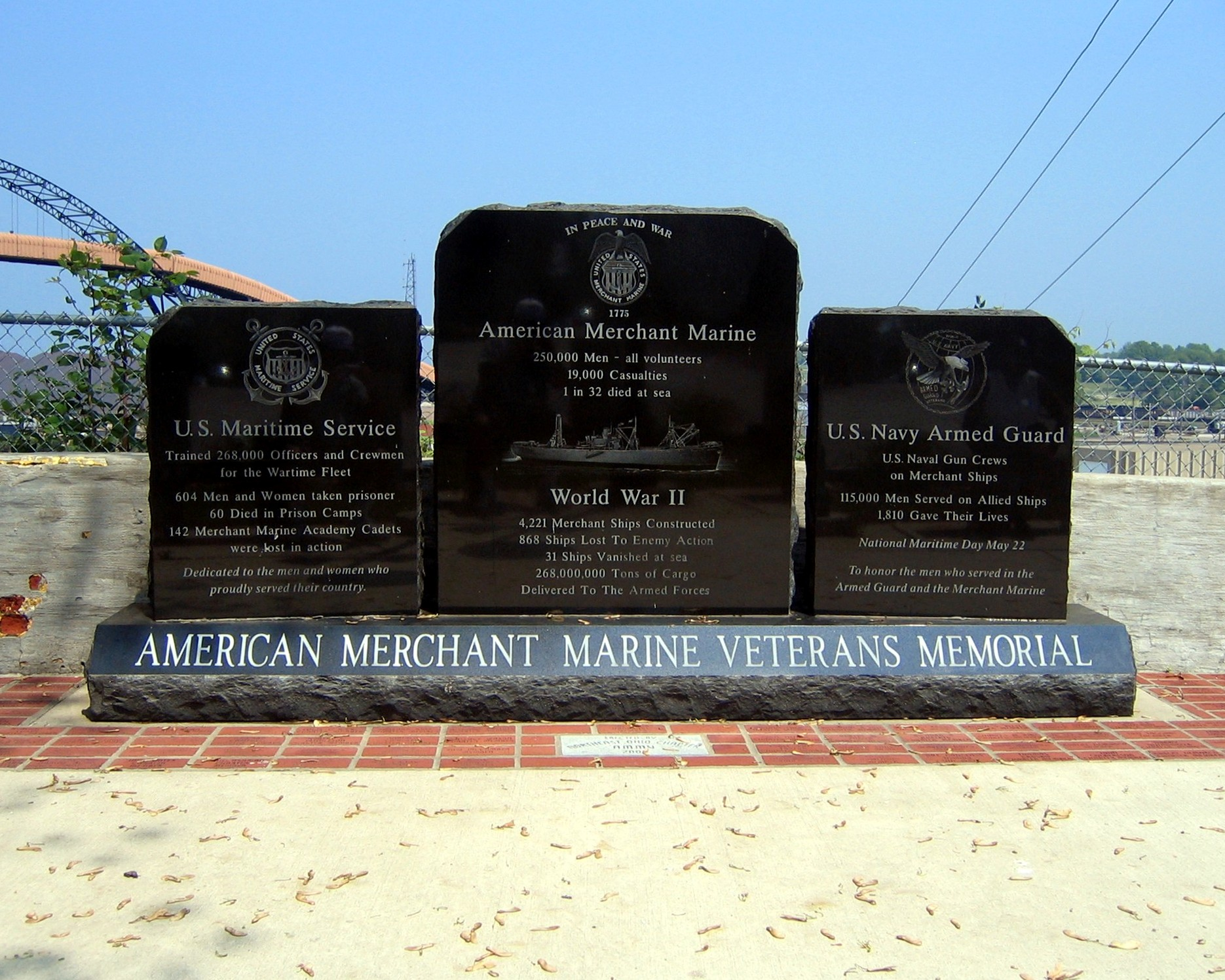
American Merchant Marine Veterans Memorial

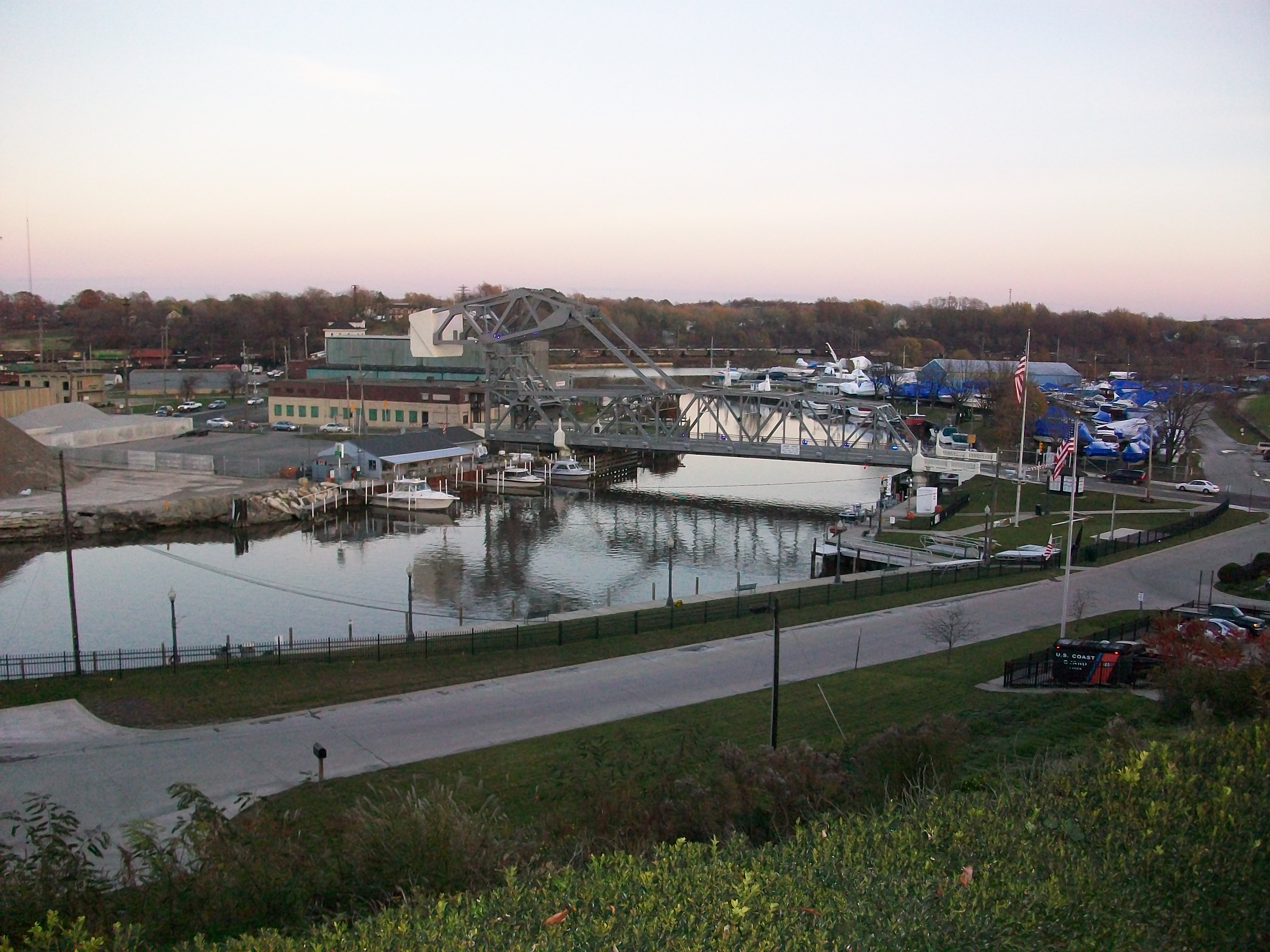
Ashtabula lift bridge viewed from Point Park

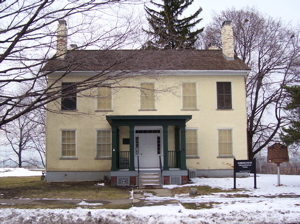
Hubbard House Underground Railroad Museum

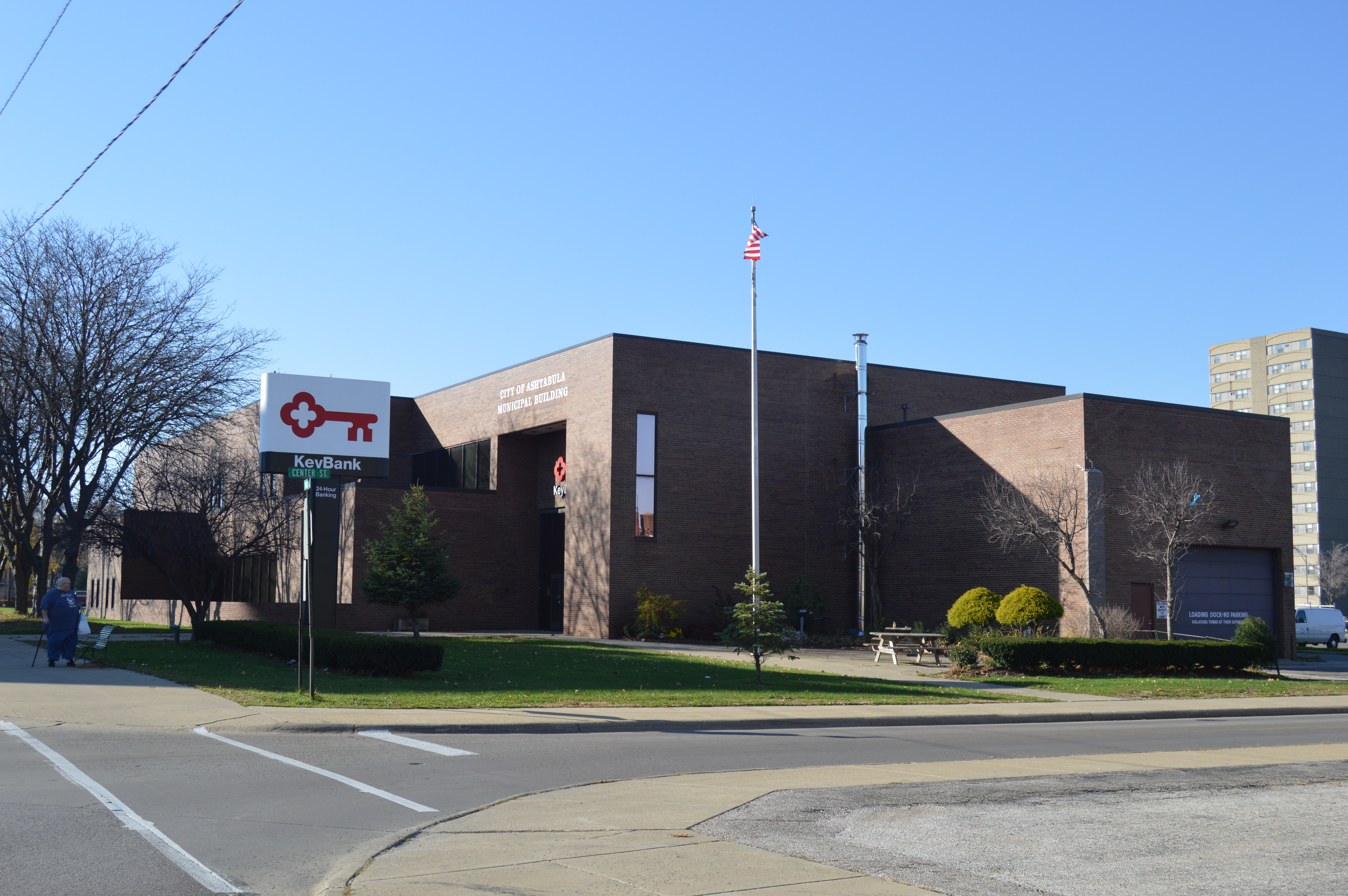
Ashtabula City Hall
