= WZOO =

WZOO may refer to:

- WZOO (AM), a radio station (700 AM) licensed to Asheboro, North Carolina, United States
- WZOO-FM, a radio station (102.5 FM) licensed to Edgewood, Ohio, United States
