= WICA-TV =

Television station in Ashtabula, Ohio (1953–1967)

Ashtabula, Ohio; United States
- Channels: Analog: 15 (UHF)

Programming
- Affiliations: Defunct

Ownership
- Owner: WICA, Inc.

History
- Founded: May 6, 1953
- First air date: September 19, 1953
- Last air date: December 26, 1967
- Call sign meaning: Industry, Commerce, Agriculture

Technical information
- ERP: 19.22 kW

WICA-TV (channel 15) was a television station in Ashtabula, Ohio, United States.

Richard D. and David C. Rowley, the founders of WICA AM/-FM, started WICA-TV in the 1950s. Hampered by broadcasting on the (then relatively unknown) UHF dial, and with no network affiliation of any sort, WICA-TV had limited broadcast hours, a sparse and often overused film library, and a heavy amount of local programming (usually filmed with only one camera).

== History ==
WICA-TV started broadcasting on September 19, 1953, but quietly signed off around June 21, 1956.

The Rowley family reactivated WICA-TV on April 4, 1966, with an intent of donating it as a non-profit educational license. As was in its first incarnation, WICA-TV was again hampered with no network programming, an often overused and limited film library of mediocre and low rental fare. In addition, WICA-TV still broadcast only in black-and-white (as was the case for many educational stations of this era) when most stations already converted to color, and still filmed local programming with only one camera, as well as only broadcasting on weekdays.

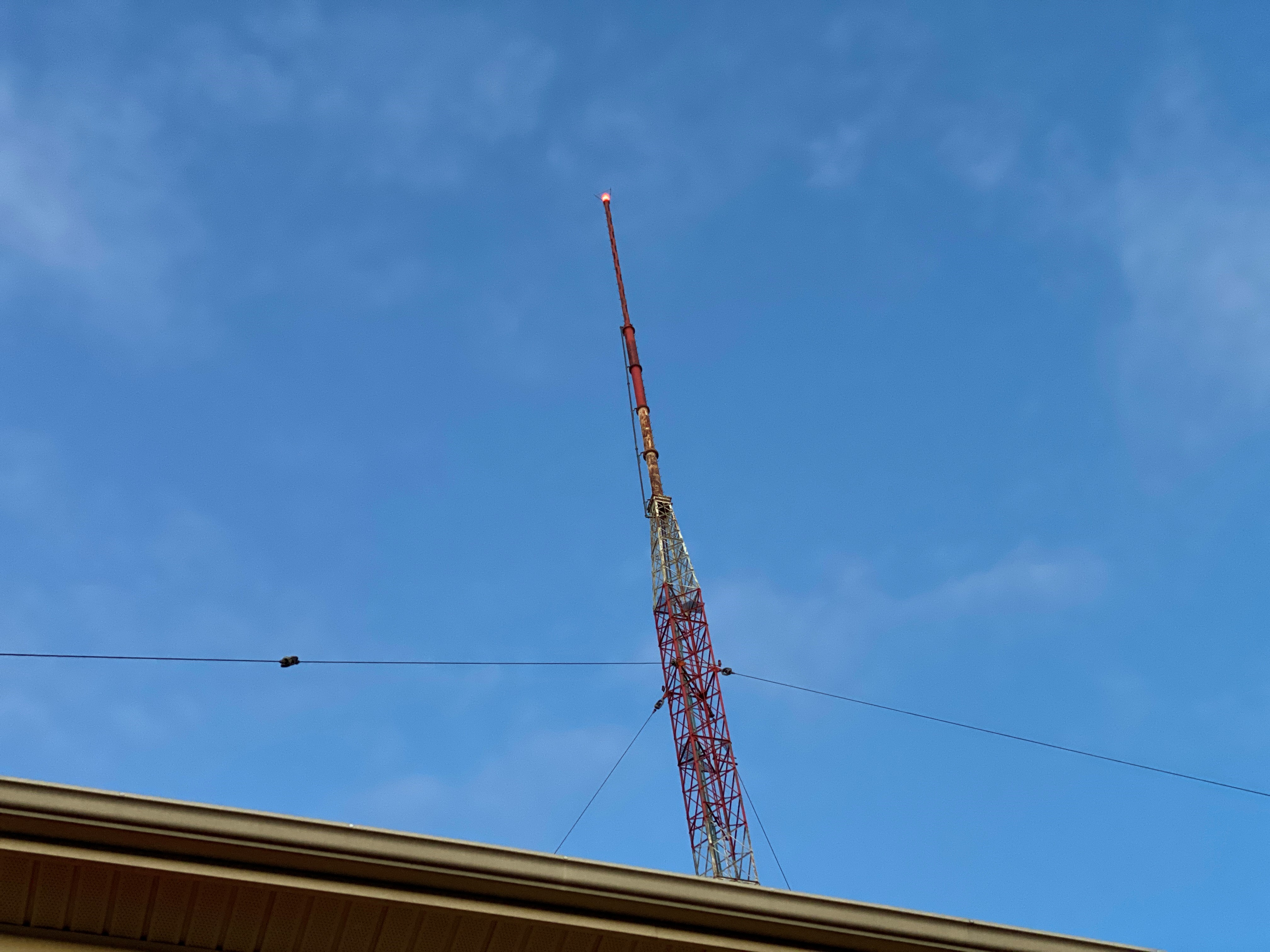
The former WICA-TV UHF mast, located on the north tower of the WFUN transmitter site.

WICA-TV signed off again for good on December 26, 1967, with its license returned to the Federal Communications Commission. The UHF antenna is the sole remaining element of WICA-TV's existence, still affixed to the WREO-FM (formerly known as WICA-FM) tower.
