= WDON =

WDON may refer to:

- WDON (AM), a radio station (1540 AM) licensed to Wheaton, Maryland, United States
- WRGX-LD, a television station (channel 23) licensed to Dothan, Alabama, United States, which used the call sign WDON-LP from 2011 to 2013
- WKKY, a radio station (104.7 FM) licensed to Geneva, Ohio, United States, which used the call sign WDON from 1982 to 1992
