= WFXJ =

WFXJ may refer to:

- WFXJ (AM), a radio station (930 AM) licensed to Jacksonville, Florida, United States
- WFXJ-FM, a radio station (107.5 FM) licensed to North Kingsville, Ohio, United States
