= Harbor High School =

Harbor High School may refer to:

- Harbor High School (Ohio) in Ashtabula, Ohio
- Harbor High School (California) in Santa Cruz, California
- Harbor High School (Washington) in Aberdeen, Washington

== See also ==
- Har-Ber High School in Springdale, Arkansas
