= WBKC =

WBKC may refer to:

- WBKC (FM), a radio station (90.9 MHz) in the K-Love network at Morgantown, Indiana, United States
- Radio stations that previously used the call sign:

- WATJ (1560 AM) in Chardon, Ohio (1969–1986)
- WABQ (1460 AM) in Painesville, Ohio (1986–2006)
- WWGK (1540 AM) in Cleveland, Ohio (October 24–November 7, 2006)
