= WFUN =

WFUN could refer to:

- WFUN (AM), a radio station (970 AM) licensed to serve Ashtabula, Ohio, United States
- WFUN-FM, a radio station (96.3 FM) licensed to serve St. Louis, Missouri, United States
- WFUN-LD, a low-power television station (channel 20, virtual 48) licensed to serve Miami, Florida, United States
- KXBS, a radio station (95.5 FM) licensed to serve Bethalto, Illinois, United States, which held the call sign WFUN-FM from 1992 to 2020
- WAXY (AM), a radio station (790 AM) licensed to serve South Miami, Florida, which held the call sign WFUN from 1961 to 1976
