= Wica =

Wica or WICA may refer to:

- Wicca, a contemporary pagan and new religious movement
- Seax-Wica, a tradition, or denomination, of the neopagan religion of Wicca
- Witches International Craft Association, established by Leo Martello in 1970
- Witchcraft Information Centre & Archive, established by Dr Leo Ruickbie in 1999
- WICA (FM), a radio station (91.5 FM) licensed to serve Traverse City, Michigan, United States
- WICA-TV, a defunct television station (channel 15) formerly licensed to serve Ashtabula, Ohio, United States, which existed from 1953 to 1956, and again from 1965 to 1967
- West Indian Court of Appeal
- When I Come Around, 1995 single by Green Day
- WICA, ICAO code for Kertajati International Airport
