= WWOW =

Radio station in Conneaut, Ohio

- Conneaut, Ohio; United States
- Broadcast area: Erie, Pennsylvania; Ashtabula, Ohio
- Frequency: 1360 kHz
- Branding: 1360 WOW

Programming
- Format: Oldies
- Affiliations: NBC News Radio; Columbus Blue Jackets Radio Network

Ownership
- Owner: Matthew Jarvi; (Lake Effect Media)

History
- First air date: 1959
- Call sign meaning: "Walking on Water" (former branding)

Technical information
- Licensing authority: FCC
- Facility ID: 13724
- Class: D
- Power: 5,000 watts daytime; 35 watts nighttime
- Transmitter coordinates: 41°55′32″N 80°32′32″W
- Translator: 102.9 W275CU (Avonia, PA)

Links
- Public license information: Public file; LMS
- Webcast: Listen live
- Website: www.1360wwow.com

WWOW (1360 AM) is a commercial radio station licensed to Conneaut, Ohio, broadcasting an oldies format. Owned by Matthew Jarvi, the station serves the eastern portions of Greater Cleveland and Northwestern Pennsylvania. The station's transmitter resides off of Middle Road in Conneaut.

== History ==
WWOW first went on-air in 1959. The station operated at that time with a daytime-only power of 500 watts. The construction permit for WWOW was first issued in November 1957. In 1964, the station's owner signed on sister station WFIZ, also licensed to Conneaut. In 1967, WWOW applied for pre-sunrise authorization, allowing it to sign on two hours prior to local sunrise. This petition was challenged by Jupiter Broadcasting, licensee of WSAI. The challenge was denied by the Federal Communications Commission (FCC).

WWOW started out as a rock 'n' roll, top 40 station and had a lot of following with Kenneth Vaughn as veteran news director for 33 years. Early DJs were names like Larry "Spyder" Snyder, Paul Allen, Bud "Stinky" Steiger and numerous others. Many locals also had their chance at being a DJ too, and filled in on weekends, holidays, etc.

The station's original owner was Louis Skelly, from Youngstown, Ohio. In July 1970, Skelly sold WWOW and WFIZ to Contemporary Media for $155,000. In 1978, sister station WFIZ was sold to Bible Broadcasting Inc. The five shareholders of Contemporary Media transferred control of the license to Doyle Flurry and Tom Childs in October 1979. The FCC approved the transfer by the end of the year. By 1985, WWOW's studios had moved from the Main Street location to Conneaut Plaza on Route 20 west and the station adopted a country format. By 1990, the station moved back to downtown Conneaut at 239 Broad Street (near its present location) and began adding oldies and farm programming to its country music format.

In the late 90s, the station flipped to a conservative talk format as "Newsradio 1360" before switching to an oldies format in May 2005 as Walking on Water - 1360 WWOW (original meaning of the call sign and as a reference to Lake Erie). In December 2006, the station was sold to Gates Mills-based Cause Plus Marketing for $200,000. In 2007, the station flipped to a catholic radio format, retaining the "Walking on Water" branding. With the format flip, the station was an affiliate of EWTN Radio. WWOW returned the conservative talk format and branding in 2009 until reverting to its current oldies format as 1360 WOW in 2011. The station additionally expanded its sports coverage significantly by carrying the Columbus Blue Jackets Radio Network and local high school basketball games.

In July 2017, WWOW signed on FM translator W275CU on 102.9 FM, licensed to Avonia, Pennsylvania.

Broadcast translator for WWOW
Call sign	Frequency	City of license	FID	ERP (W)	Class	FCC info
W275CU	102.9 FM	Avonia, Pennsylvania	13724	160	D	LMS
