= Ashtabula Township, Ohio =

Township in Ohio, US

Ashtabula Township, Ashtabula County, Ohio
- Township
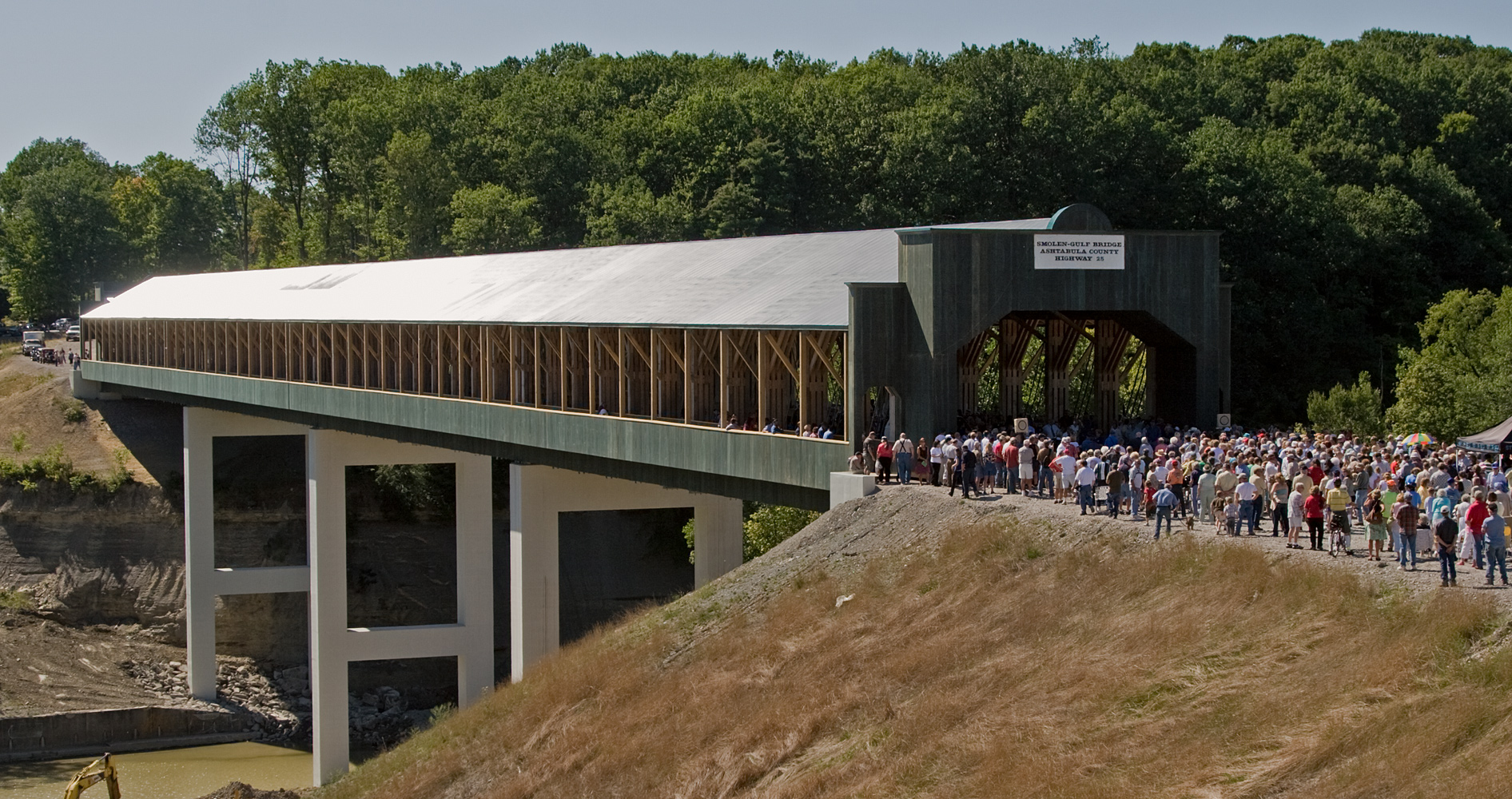
- Smolen–Gulf Bridge

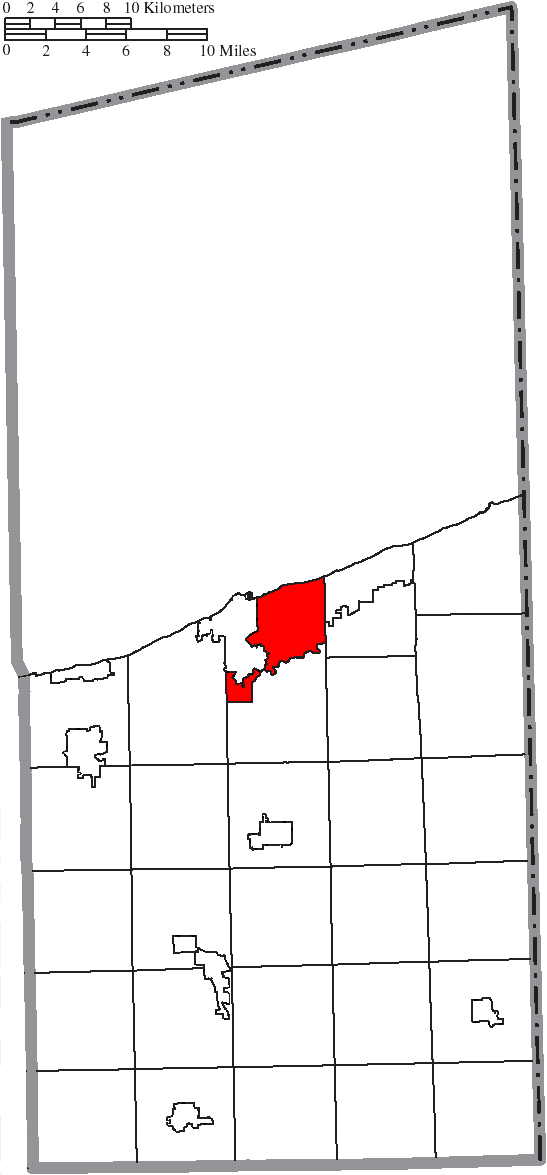
- Location of Ashtabula Township in Ashtabula County
- Coordinates: 41°52′37″N 80°47′7″W
- Country: United States
- State: Ohio
- County: Ashtabula

Area
  - Total: 20.3 sq mi (52.6 km^{2})
  - Land: 20.1 sq mi (52.0 km^{2})
  - Water: 0.19 sq mi (0.5 km^{2})
- Elevation: 581 ft (177 m)

Population (2020)
  - Total: 19,585
  - Density: 1,042/sq mi (402.3/km^{2})
- Time zone: UTC-5 (Eastern (EST))
  - Summer (DST): UTC-4 (EDT)
- ZIP codes: 44004-44005
- Area code: 440
- FIPS code: 39-02652
- GNIS feature ID: 1085719
- Website: ashtabulatownship.com

Ashtabula Township is one of the twenty-seven townships of Ashtabula County, Ohio, United States. As of the 2020 census the population was 19,585.

== Geography ==
Located in the northern part of the county along Lake Erie, it borders the following townships:

- Kingsville Township - east
- Plymouth Township - south
- Saybrook Township - west

The Canadian province of Ontario lies across Lake Erie to the north.

Most of the city of Ashtabula is located in western Ashtabula Township, and the census-designated place of Edgewood is located in the township's southeast.

=== Major highways ===
- US 20
- SR 11
- SR 84
- SR 531

== Name and history ==
It is the only Ashtabula Township statewide.

The first white settler in the township was one Matthew Hubbard, who arrived in Ashtabula County from Connecticut in 1804.

== Government ==
The township is governed by a three-member board of trustees, who are elected in November of odd-numbered years to a four-year term beginning on the following January 1. Two are elected in the year after the presidential election and one is elected in the year before it. There is also an elected township fiscal officer, who serves a four-year term beginning on April 1 of the year after the election, which is held in November of the year before the presidential election. Vacancies in the fiscal officership or on the board of trustees are filled by the remaining trustees. Currently, the board is composed of chairman Stephen McClure and members Sam Bucci and Joseph Pete, Sr.
