= Ben Moreell (steamer) =

Lake freighter on the North American Great Lakes

Ben Moreell was a lake freighter on the North American Great Lakes.

In 1958, she collided with the ferry Ashtabula in the harbor of Ashtabula, Ohio.

In 1977, she was renamed Alastair Guthrie.
