= WYBL =

Radio station in Ashtabula, Ohio

- Ashtabula, Ohio; United States
- Frequency: 98.3 MHz
- Branding: 98.3 The Bull

Programming
- Format: Country music
- Affiliations: Cleveland Guardians Radio Network; Compass Media Networks

Ownership
- Owner: Lilly Broadcasting; (Glenora Radio Network LLC)
- Sister stations: WFUN; WFXJ-FM; WREO-FM; WZOO-FM

History
- First air date: September 2005
- Call sign meaning: "The Bull"

Technical information
- Licensing authority: FCC
- Facility ID: 87818
- Class: A
- ERP: 5,300 watts
- HAAT: 105.0 meters (344.5 ft)
- Transmitter coordinates: 41°51′14.00″N 80°41′20.00″W

Links
- Public license information: Public file; LMS
- Website: 983thebull.com

WYBL (98.3 FM, "The Bull") is a radio station in Ashtabula, Ohio, United States, broadcasting a country music format. Owned by Lilly Broadcasting, WYBL's studios are located in Ashtabula while its transmitter is located near Benetka Rd and Plymouth Ridge Rd south of I-90. It is one of five stations in Lilly's Ashtabula cluster, the others being WFUN, WFXJ-FM, WREO-FM, and WZOO-FM.

== History ==
WYBL signed on in August 2005. The 98.3 FM frequency had belonged to then-owner Clear Channel Communications (now known as iHeartMedia) for a number of years. 98.3 FM and sister station 107.5 FM were purchased at auction at the same time. 107.5 FM was focused on and developed first as a Classic Rock station. 98.3 FM "The Bull" came years later. Before becoming the country station that it would become, the signal of 98.3 was used for some time to run oldies (presumable to test the frequency and market for popularity). Soon after, The Bull came to air.

In the Fall of 2007, Clear Channel Communications sold WYBL to Media One Radio Group along with its sister stations WFUN (AM) (News/Talk at the time), WFXJ-FM (Classic Rock), WREO-FM (Hot AC at the time), WZOO-FM (Top 40 at the time).

Lilly Broadcasting, owner of WICU-TV and operator of WSEE-TV in Erie, Pennsylvania, acquired Media One's radio stations in Ashtabula and Jamestown, New York, in December 2025 for a combined $4 million.

=== Original Lineup ===
6am-10am - McCoy in the Morning with Roger McCoy and Dave Hatfield (Scony was a later addition, however Hatfield left the show to pursue his own show on the station. Scony left the station in 2011 to move to Nashville to pursue a career in the record industry while Roger left in June 2013 to become the assistant program and music director for Clear Channel of Asheville, North Carolina at WKSF-FM )

10am-3pm - Jake Andrews (left the station in April 2008 to pursue his photography business)

3pm-7pm - Kristi Lee (left the station after only a few months to start her family)

7p-Midnight - Paul West (in 2006 Paul pursued a career with Clear Channel in Albany, New York)
