= WQGR =

Radio station in North Madison, Ohio

- North Madison, Ohio; United States
- Broadcast area: Lake County; Ashtabula County; Geauga County
- Frequency: 93.7 MHz
- Branding: Gold 93.7

Programming
- Format: Oldies
- Affiliations: ONN Radio

Ownership
- Owner: Music Express Broadcasting Corp.
- Sister stations: WKKY

History
- First air date: August 1, 2013
- Call sign meaning: Former "Cougar" branding

Technical information
- Licensing authority: FCC
- Facility ID: 61162
- Class: A
- ERP: 6,000 watts
- HAAT: 79 meters (259 ft)
- Transmitter coordinates: 41°44′48.80″N 81°04′48.80″W

Links
- Public license information: Public file; LMS
- Webcast: Listen live
- Website: gold937fm.com

WQGR (93.7 FM) is a commercial radio station licensed to North Madison, Ohio, United States, featuring an oldies format. It is owned by the Music Express Broadcasting Corporation.

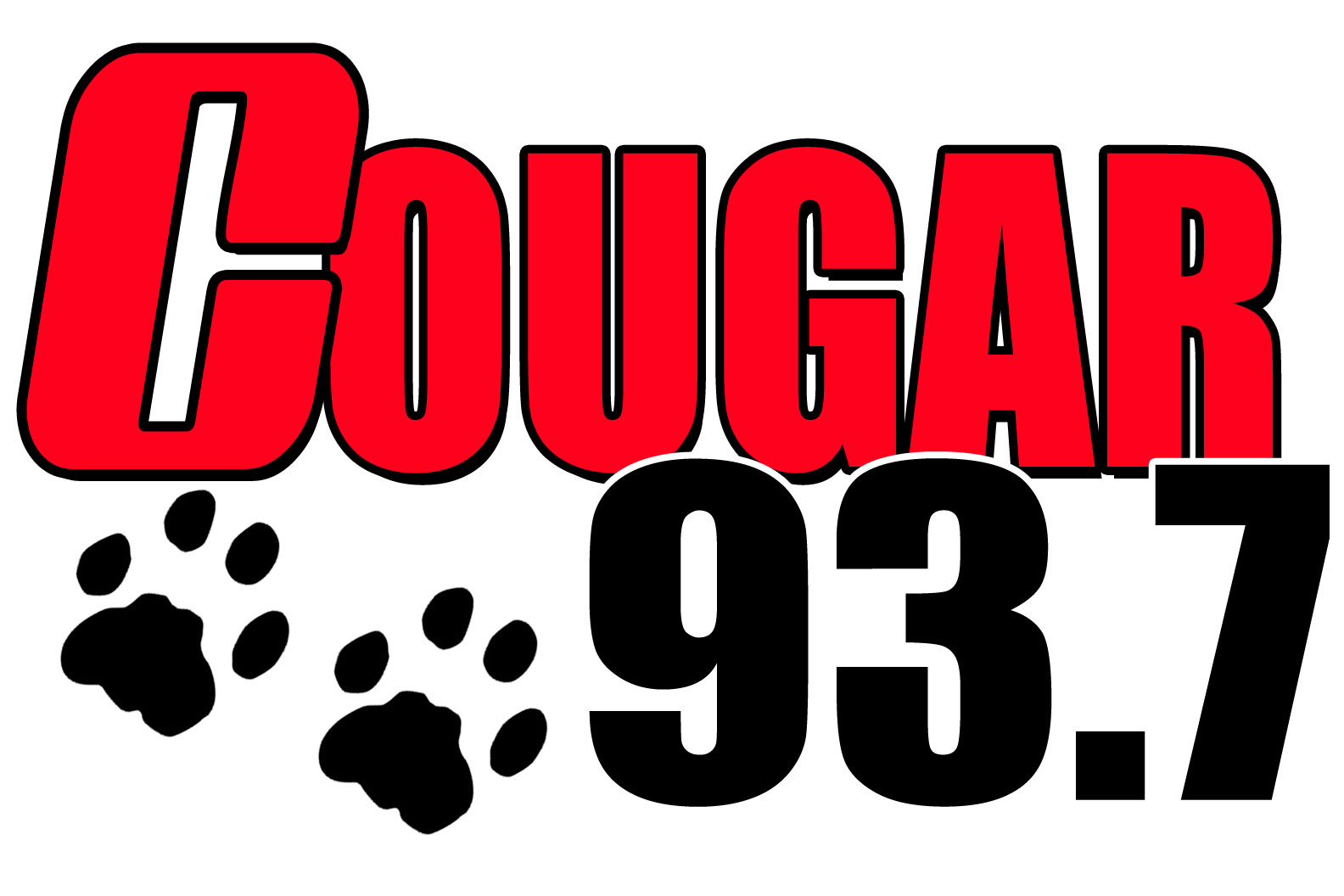
WQGR (FM) Logo From 2013 To 2018

WQGR went on the air August 1, 2013. WQGR's studios are off Mentor Avenue in Mentor, while the transmitter resides off I-90 in Madison Township. WQGR shares its studios with sister station WREO-FM.

On December 10, 2018, at 6:00 AM, WQGR (as Cougar 93.7 FM) flipped formats from Hot Adult Contemporary to oldies as “Gold 93.7” with legendary Cleveland broadcaster Ted Alexander II serving as Program Director.

WQGR was sold to Music Express Broadcasting, owner of WKKY/Geneva OH, August 2025. Ted retired November 30, 2025.

January 5, 2026, WQGR relaunched under new Program Director Chuck Matthews with its main branding as "Fun Music of the 60s, 70s and Beyond!" and "Greatest Hits of the 60s and 70s". TM Studios Overture jingles added, as well as 35+ year market veteran Mark Allen, who previously spent 23 years at WREO/Mix 97.1, added for mornings and as Operations Manager. Allen, like many, was a COVID casualty and off air since 2020. WQGR's new imaging voice is Jeff Laurence. Matthews worked at WMJI/Cleveland in the '90s. Classic Hits/Oldies programming, on air and imaging experience includes WTRG/Raleigh, WOMC/Detroit, WLCL/Atlanta, WRQN/Toledo, WAKR/Akron, and host/writer/producer of DMX Primestar Satellite's "Good Time Oldies" channel. DMX the precursor to DirecTV. He hosts the nationally syndicated classic hits radio show Greatest Hits USA, which is carried on WQGR. Additional syndicated programming added; The Wolfman Jack Show, Blue Suede Connection (Elvis), History of Rock and Roll with Wink Martindale, MG Kelly's Back to the 70s, American Hit List, Beatle Brunch, Jumpin' Joe's Basement Show hosted by Cleveland native Joe Madigan, Sunday Matinee Radio, and Into the 60s with The Real Don Steele.
