= WZOO-FM =

Radio station in Edgewood, Ohio

Coordinates: 41.829°N 80.824°W

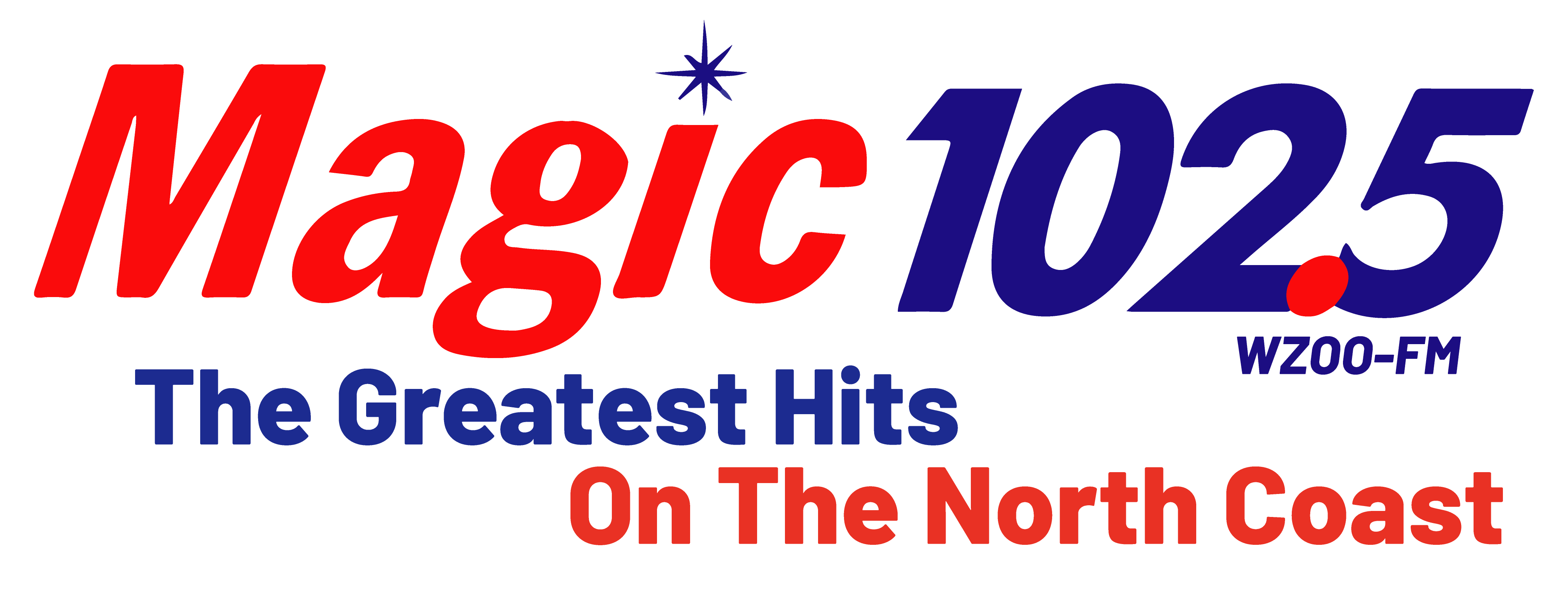
- Edgewood, Ohio; United States
- Broadcast area: Ashtabula, Ohio
- Frequency: 102.5 MHz
- Branding: Magic 102.5

Programming
- Format: Classic hits

Ownership
- Owner: Lilly Broadcasting; (Glenora Radio Network LLC)
- Sister stations: WFUN; WFXJ-FM; WREO-FM; WYBL

History
- First air date: January 23, 1989
- Call sign meaning: Zoo

Technical information
- Licensing authority: FCC
- Facility ID: 7819
- Class: A
- ERP: 5,800 watts
- HAAT: 100 meters (330 ft)

Links
- Public license information: Public file; LMS
- Website: magicoldies1025.com

WZOO-FM (102.5 FM) is a commercial radio station licensed to Edgewood, Ohio, United States, with a classic hits radio format. Owned by Lilly Broadcasting, it is one of five stations in Lilly's Ashtabula cluster, the others being WFUN, WFXJ-FM, WREO-FM, and WYBL.

WZOO-FM is not connected in any way with WZOO, an AM radio station in Asheboro, North Carolina, sharing the same callsign.

== History ==
WZOO-FM was founded by John A. Bulmer, an experienced broadcaster who was awarded a number of FCC permits to construct new FM stations in Ohio, Indiana, and Glens Falls, New York (Lake Luzerne). When Bulmer constructed the new Ashtabula station on 102.5 MHz, he wanted something that rhymed with the 102 dial position. Mr. Bulmer desired the name ZOO. However, WZOO was already in use by an AM radio station in North Carolina.

Bulmer was able to take advantage of an FCC policy that allowed him to be granted the WZOO call sign on FM (as WZOO-FM) by obtaining the written permission from WZOO (AM) in Asheboro, North Carolina. Mr. Bulmer paid the licensee of WZOO (AM) $1,000 to grant him permission. Hence, "102 ZOO" was born. WZOO-FM was one of five construction permits granted to Bulmer in the late 1980s/early '90s. At that time, prior to FCC auctions for frequencies, Bulmer discovered a not-widely-known FCC policy whereby if a filing window closed and there were no applications filed, the FCC would then grant a construction permit (authority to build the radio station) under "First Come/First Served" processing rules. While the general public was often stampeding to the next newly opened filing window, Bulmer was combing the FCC's records for windows that had just closed to ascertain what FCC filing windows drew no applications for a particular community.

As a result, Mr. Bulmer received construction permits to construct new FM stations in Edgewood, Ohio (Ashtabula, Ohio, WZOO-FM), North Baltimore, Ohio (WHMQ FM, Findlay, Ohio, now WPFX), Royal Center, Indiana (WHZR (FM) "Hoosier 103" in Logansport, Indiana) and WJBI-FM in Windslow (Augusta-Waterville, Maine). Bulmer constructed three of those four stations (he gave the WJBI-FM permit back to the FCC, as the economy had hit the skids in the early 1990s) and built an entire group of new FM stations from construction permits. Arguably, 102 ZOO was Bulmer's most successful station in the group. Having constructed the station in late 1988 for approximately $140,000, he sold the station to Richard and David Rowley of Ashtabula in May 1999. Bulmer recently sold his last stations, WDOE (AM) and WBKX (FM) ("96 Kix FM") in Dunkirk-Fredonia, New York and he is now retired, spending time between homes in Pennsylvania and Florida.

The station was most commonly known under the nickname "102 ZOO" right after going on the air in 1989 right up until October 2007. It has, however, changed its slogan several times from originally being "The Exciting FM" in 1989 and into the early 1990s when it operated under a Top 40 format.

Then, in the mid 90s, 102 ZOO changed format to become a Hot AC (hot adult contemporary) station. It also changed its slogan to "No Rap, No Metal, No Way". In the early 2000s, when the station was sold by local owners, brothers Richard & David Rowley to Clear Channel. 102 ZOO changed its slogan again to "Your Hit Music Station". The station remained Hot AC until flipping back to a Top 40 (CHR) format in September 2006. Then, in October 2007, Media One Radio Group (who acquired the station from Clear Channel) switched 102 ZOO to a classic hits format on October 5, 2007, as its current Magic 102.5.

Lilly Broadcasting, owner of WICU-TV and operator of WSEE-TV in Erie, Pennsylvania, acquired Media One's radio stations in Ashtabula and Jamestown, New York, in December 2025 for a combined $4 million.
