= Ashtabula Area City School District =

School district in Ohio, United States

Address
- 6610 Sanborn Road Ashtabula, Ashtabula County, Ohio, 44004-2405; United States

District information
- Type: Public
- Grades: PK-12
- Established: 1961; 65 years ago
- Schools: 7
- NCES District ID: 3904351

Students and staff
- Enrollment: 2,635 (2025–2026)
- Teachers: 135.61 (on an FTE basis) (2025–2026)
- Staff: 344.22 (on an FTE basis) (2025–2026)
- Student–teacher ratio: 19.43 (2025–2026)
- District mascot: Dragons

Other information
- Website: www.aacs.net

The Ashtabula Area City School District is a school district located in Ashtabula, Ohio, United States. The district consists of one high school, two middle schools, and 4 elementary schools.

== History ==
The Ashtabula Area City School District formed in 1961, with the consolidations of Ashtabula City Schol District, Harbor Exempted Village School District and Saybrook Local School District. The school district originally had two high schools, Harbor High School and Ashtabula High School, both of which were in operation since the early 1800s and 1910s.

in 2001, Lakeside High School was formed following the consolidation of Harbor High School and Ashtabula High School. For its first few years of operation 9th-grade students were taught in the old Harbor High School, while 10-12th grade students attended the old Ashtabula High School.

In 2006, the current high school campus was opened. The high school campus was the first of a total of seven new campus style school buildings to be erected in the area. Around the same time, several long standings elementary and junior high schools were closed, and several were demolished.

In 2024, Lakeside High School roof was damaged following a snowstorm. The High School attempted to secure a bond to repair the roof but was later rejected. Ashtabula Area City School filed a lawsuit after their insurance company Liberty Mutual refused to pay for the roof. As of 2025, the lawsuit is still ongoing. Student and staff have since relocate to a former elementary school.

== Schools ==
Schools within the district consist of

=== High School ===
- Lakeside High School

=== Middle Schools ===
- Lakeside Junior High School
- Erie Intermediate School

=== Elementary Schools ===
- Huron Primary School
- Michigan Primary School
- Ontario Primary School
- Superior Intermediate School

=== Former Schools ===
- Harbor High School
- Ashtabula High School
- Columbus Ave School
- Park Junior High School
- State Road School
- Station Ave School
- West Junior High School
- Windermere School
- Thomas Jefferson School
- Washington School
