= WFXJ-FM =

Radio station in North Kingsville, Ohio

- North Kingsville, Ohio; United States
- Broadcast area: Ashtabula, Ohio
- Frequency: 107.5 MHz
- Branding: 107.5 The Fox

Programming
- Format: Classic rock
- Affiliations: Premiere Networks; United Stations Radio Networks

Ownership
- Owner: Lilly Broadcasting; (Glenora Radio Network LLC)
- Sister stations: WFUN, WREO-FM, WYBL, WZOO-FM

History
- First air date: August 6, 2001
- Former call signs: WPHR (1999–2001); WCUZ (2001)
- Call sign meaning: "Fox"

Technical information
- Licensing authority: FCC
- Facility ID: 76320
- Class: A
- ERP: 3,600 watts
- HAAT: 130 meters (430 ft)
- Transmitter coordinates: 41°53′4.00″N 80°38′28.00″W

Links
- Public license information: Public file; LMS
- Webcast: Listen live
- Website: thefox1075.com

WFXJ-FM (107.5 FM, "107.5 The Fox") is a commercial radio station licensed to North Kingsville, Ohio, United States, featuring a classic rock format. Owned by Lilly Broadcasting, the station serves the Northeast Ohio county of Ashtabula, and is the local affiliate for The Bob & Tom Show and Nights with Alice Cooper. The WFXJ-FM studios are located in the city of Ashtabula, while the station transmitter resides in Kingsville. It is one of five stations in Lilly's Ashtabula cluster, the others being WFUN, WREO-FM, WYBL, and WZOO-FM.

== History ==
The construction permit for the station was obtained by Emily W. Chismar in the name of EWC Enterprises, Ltd. on April 22, 1999, and the calls WPHR were granted on October 15, 1999. The construction permit was transferred to Clear Channel Communications on July 11, 2000. Clear Channel obtained the calls WCUZ on January 18, 2001, when it moved the WPHR calls to its station in Tulsa, Oklahoma. It finally settled on WFXJ-FM on August 6, 2001.

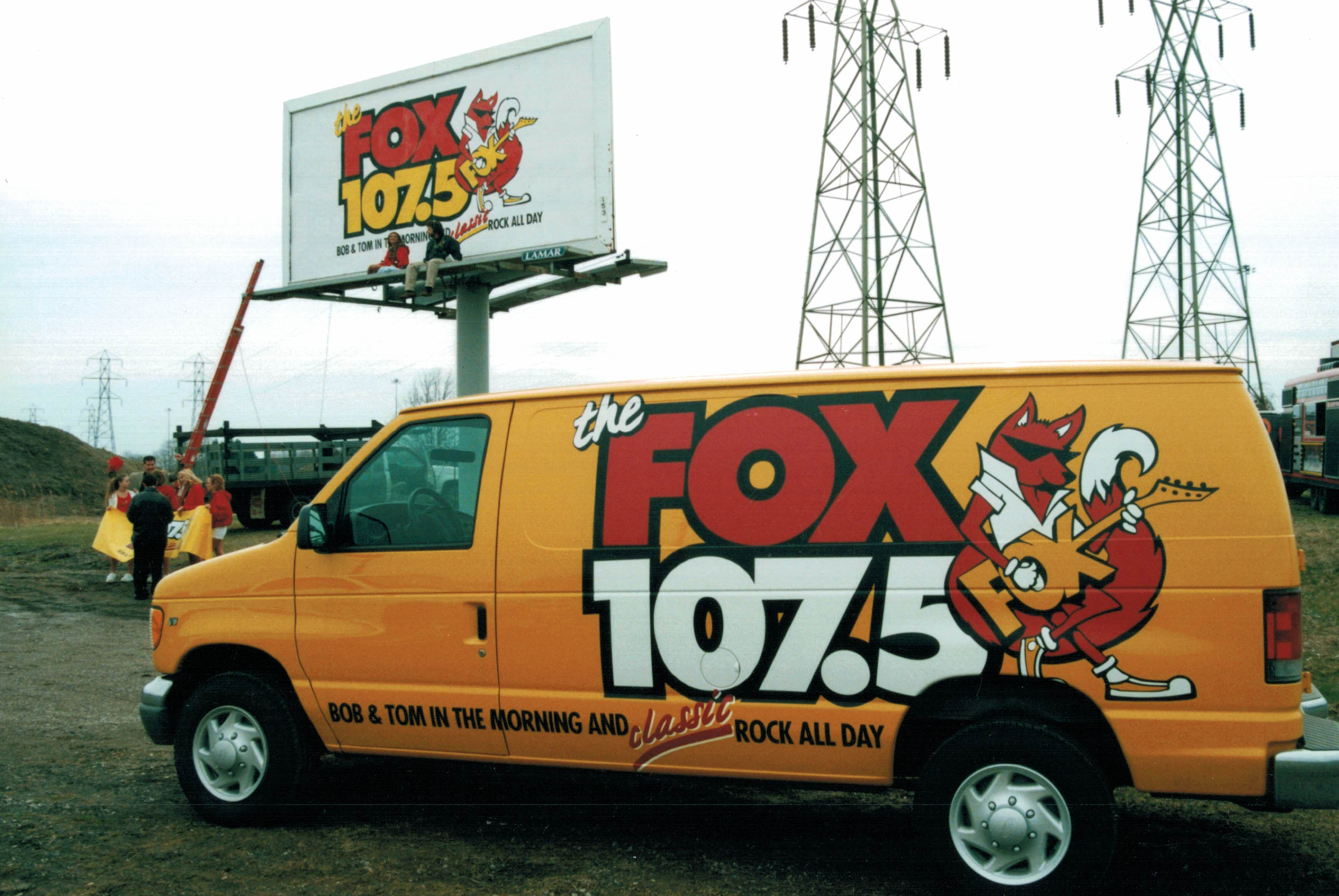
Billboard And Remote Van During WFXJ-FM's Launch in 2001

WFXJ-FM was sold off by Clear Channel to Media One Radio Group in September 2007. Lilly Broadcasting, owner of WICU-TV and operator of WSEE-TV in Erie, Pennsylvania, acquired Media One's radio stations in Ashtabula and Jamestown, New York, in December 2025 for a combined $4 million.

== Current programming ==
WFXJ-FM airs The Bob & Tom Show during weekday mornings via Premiere Networks, and Nights with Alice Cooper weekday nights via United Stations Radio Networks.
