= Ashtabula (ferry) =

American train ferry

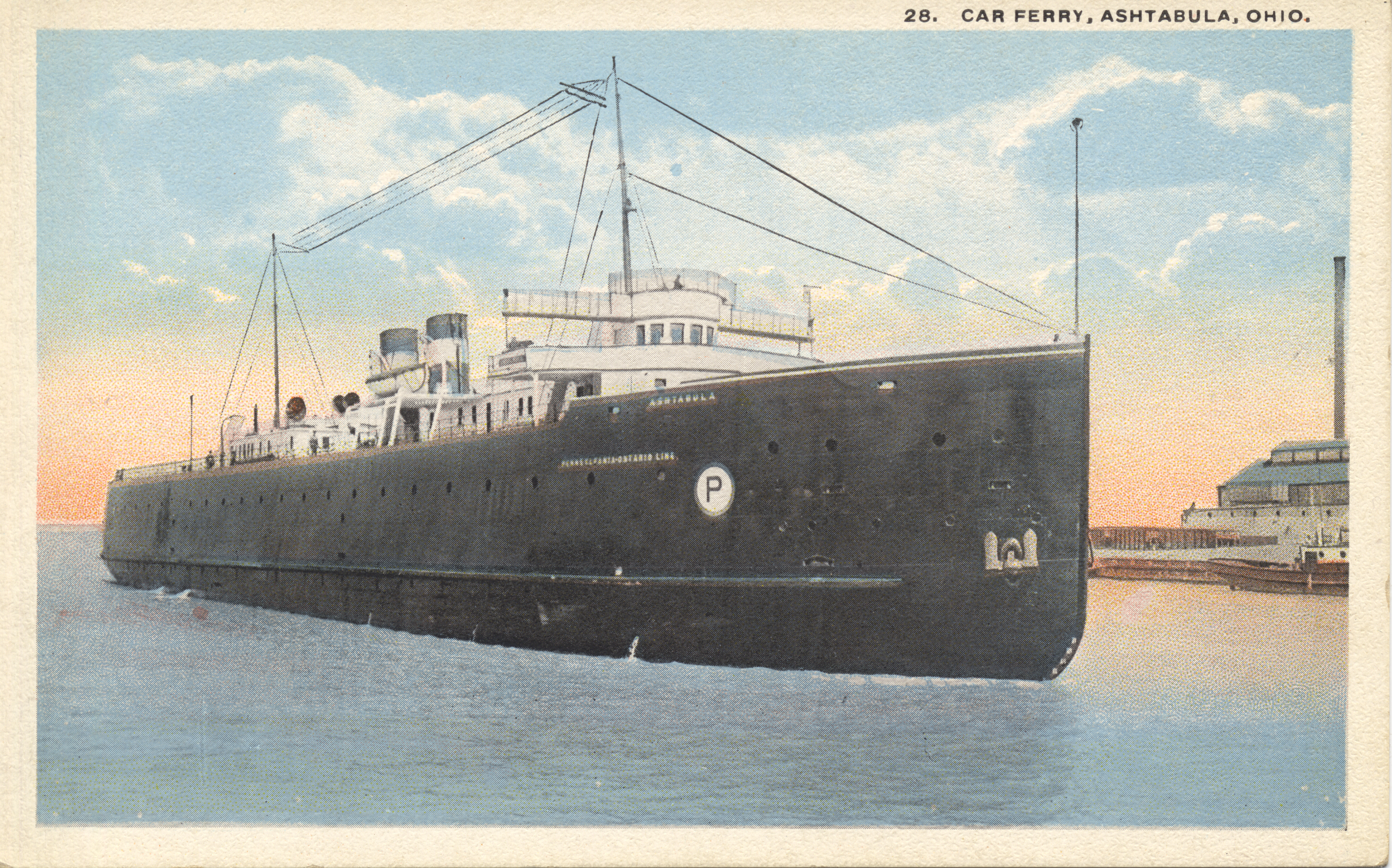
The ferry Ashtabula

Ashtabula was a train ferry that traveled between Ashtabula, Ohio, on the south shore of Lake Erie, to Port Burwell, Ontario, on the north shore. Ashtabula was built in 1906, at the Great Lakes Engineering Works in St. Clair, Michigan, to transport ore and coal cars. She sank on 18 September 1958 after colliding with the steamer Ben Moreell in Ashtabula harbour. Her wreck was later raised and scrapped.
