= WZOO (AM) =

- Asheboro, North Carolina; United States
- Broadcast area: Piedmont Triad
- Frequency: 700 kHz
- Branding: 99.9 FM The Zoo

Programming
- Format: Oldies; Classic hits Classic Top 40
- Affiliations: ABC Radio News; AccuWeather

Ownership
- Owner: RCR of Randolph County, Ltd.

History
- First air date: May 3, 1971 (on 710)
- Former call signs: DWZOO (2004–2007)
- Former frequencies: 710 kHz (1971–2014)
- Call sign meaning: city of license is home of the North Carolina Zoo

Technical information
- Licensing authority: FCC
- Facility ID: 20558
- Class: B
- Power: 1,000 watts day and critical hours
- Transmitter coordinates: 35°45′50.0″N 79°50′4.0″W
- Translators: 99.9 W260CG (Asheboro); 106.1 W291DM (Greensboro)

Links
- Public license information: Public file; LMS
- Webcast: WZOO Webstream
- Website: WZOO Online

WZOO (700 kHz) is an oldies, classic hits, and classic top 40 formatted broadcast radio station licensed to Asheboro, North Carolina, serving the Piedmont Triad. WZOO is owned and operated by RCR of Randolph County, Ltd.

WZOO is not connected in any way with WZOO-FM, an FM radio station in Edgewood, Ohio, sharing the same callsign.

== Translators ==
In addition to the main station, WZOO is relayed by two FM translators to widen its broadcast area.

Broadcast translators for WZOO
Call sign	Frequency	City of license	FID	ERP (W)	HAAT	Class	FCC info
W260CG	99.9 FM	Asheboro, North Carolina	153753	250	104 m (341 ft)	D	LMS
W291DM	106.1 FM	Greensboro, North Carolina	202428	250	161 m (528 ft)	D	LMS
