= WATJ =

Radio station in Chardon, Ohio (1962–2004)

- Chardon, Ohio; United States
- Broadcast area: Greater Cleveland (limited)
- Frequency: 1560 kHz

Ownership
- Owner: Music Express Broadcasting Corporation of Northeast Ohio
- Sister stations: WKKY

History
- First air date: June 16, 1962
- Last air date: October 1, 2004
- Former call signs: WGLD (1962–1965); WBKC (1969–1986); WCDN (1986–1990)
- Call sign meaning: "Warren and Ted Jones"

Technical information
- Licensing authority: FCC
- Facility ID: 20337
- Class: D
- Power: 1,000 watts (daytime only)
- Transmitter coordinates: 41°34′3.00″N 81°11′33.00″W

Links
- Public license information: Public file; LMS

WATJ was a commercial daytime-only radio station licensed to Chardon, Ohio, at 1560 AM, and served parts of Greater Cleveland. The station broadcast from 1962 to 2004, ceasing operations when the owners voluntarily turned their license back to the Federal Communications Commission (FCC) for cancellation.

== History ==
What ended up becoming WATJ first went on the air on June 16, 1962, as WGLD, a mere 500-watt daytimer. WGLD fell silent around 1965. Al Kipp, who was the general manager of WELW in Willoughby at the time, was hired by a new group to put the station back on the air. They built studios and a four-tower directional array on Aquilla Road east of Route 44 in Chardon, boosting power to 1,000 watts with a very tight directional pattern, the largest lobe of the signal beamed up into populous Lake County.

At one time, WBKC even had a satellite studio at the Great Lakes Mall. Al Kipp did much of the field engineering work for the construction permit. The call letters WBKC stood for this: the B was for Oliver Bolton, Congresswoman Frances Bolton's son, and one of the owners. The K stood for Albert King, owner of the Chardon-based King Trucking Company, another owner. The C stood for Chardon.

This group owned the station, with Al Kipp as GM, until it was sold to Dale Broadcasting, headed by Painesville businessman Donald L. Smith, for $264,000 in January 1980. Clarence Bucaro of WERE (1300 AM), who had been a salesman at WBKC in the mid-1970s, became the general manager.

In late November 1985, Dale Broadcasting purchased Painesville station WQLS for $750,000, while concurrently selling off WBKC to Kendee Broadcasting for $350,000. The call letters for WQLS were changed to WBKC (1460 AM) on March 3, 1986, with WBKC taking the call sign WCDN, for Chardon. Kendee Broadcasting eventually sold WCDN to the Music Express Broadcasting Corp., headed by Warren, Alison and Ted Jones, for $150,000 in December 1988. Following the purchase, WCDN's call letters were changed to WATJ, after the principal owners.

WATJ once played a beautiful music format with ethnic programming on the weekends, but last aired a sports radio format under the name "SportsRadio 1560AM," later serving as an affiliate for Sporting News Radio programming.

Music Express Broadcasting shut down WATJ's operations, and turned the license back in to the FCC, on October 1, 2004.
