= WGOJ =

Radio station in Conneaut, Ohio

- Conneaut, Ohio; United States
- Broadcast area: Ashtabula County, Ohio; Erie County, Pennsylvania
- Frequency: 105.5 MHz
- Branding: WGOJ 105.5 FM

Programming
- Format: Christian talk and teaching
- Affiliations: Salem Radio Network; VCY America

Ownership
- Owner: Bible Broadcasting, Inc.

History
- First air date: April 5, 1964
- Former call signs: WFIZ (1964–1978)
- Call sign meaning: “Wonderful Grace of Jesus”

Technical information
- Licensing authority: FCC
- Facility ID: 5092
- Class: A
- ERP: 6,000 watts
- HAAT: 90 meters (300 ft)
- Transmitter coordinates: 41°51′42″N 80°31′00″W

Links
- Public license information: Public file; LMS
- Website: wgojradio.com

WGOJ (105.5 FM) is a radio station licensed to Conneaut, Ohio, serving Ashtabula County, Ohio, Erie County, Pennsylvania, and most of Crawford County, Pennsylvania. WGOJ's studios are located on Mill Street in Conneaut, while the transmitter resides in Albion, Pennsylvania. The station broadcasts a Christian talk and teaching format.

== History ==
The station began broadcasting on April 5, 1964 and was owned by Louis Skelly. It held the call sign WFIZ and was a sister station to AM 1360 WWOW. In 1970, WFIZ and its sister station were sold to Contemporary Media, Inc. for $155,000. Initially airing a separate format, by the mid 1970s, it was simulcasting most of its sister station's country music programming. In 1978, the station was sold to Bible Broadcasting, Inc. (Note: Not to be confused with the Bible Broadcasting Network.) for $125,000 and it began airing its current religious format. Its call sign was changed to WGOJ the following year.

On November 9, 2024, a house nearby the studio in Conneaut caught on fire, damaging a portion of the studio.

== Programming ==
WGOJ is the local affiliate of Turning Point Radio, Thru the Bible Radio, Insight for Living, and Focus on the Family.
