= Lakeside High School (Ashtabula, Ohio) =

Public high school located in Saybrook Township, Ohio U.S.

Location
- 6600 Sanborn Road; Ashtabula, (Ashtabula County), Ohio 44004; United States
- Coordinates: 41°50′40″N 80°49′15″W

Information
- Type: Public, Coeducational
- Opened: 2001
- School district: Ashtabula Area City SD
- School code: 360-218
- Principal: Douglas Wetherholt
- Teaching staff: 39.00 (FTE)
- Grades: 9-12
- Student to teacher ratio: 21.74
- Colors: Forest green & vegas gold
- Athletics conference: Chagrin Valley Conference
- Team name: Dragons
- Newspaper: "Dragon's Eye"
- Yearbook: "The Legacy"
- Website: lhs.aacs.net

Lakeside High School is a public high school located in Saybrook Township, Ohio. It is the only high school in the Ashtabula Area City School District. Athletic Teams are known as the Dragons, and they compete in the Ohio High School Athletic Association in the Chagrin Valley Conference Lake Division.

== History ==
Lakeside High School, opened in 2001, following a consolidation of the former Harbor and Ashtabula High Schools serves students in grades 9–12. For its first few years of operation 9th-grade students were taught in the old Harbor High School, while 10–12th grade students attended the old Ashtabula High School.

In 2006, the current campus was opened. The high school campus was the first of a total of seven new campus style school buildings to be erected in the area.

In 2024, Lakeside High School roof was damaged following a snowstorm. The High School attempted to secure a bond to repair the roof but was later rejected. Ashtabula Area City School filed a lawsuit after their insurance company Liberty Mutual refused to pay for the roof. As of 2025, the lawsuit is still ongoing. Student and staff have since relocate to a former elementary school. Demolition of the academic wing began in February 2026.

=== Facilities prior to consolidation ===
Harbor High School

Harbor High School was a public high school that served the harbor area of Ashtabula, Ohio from 1911 until it was closed in 2001 in order to merge with nearby Ashtabula High School under the name of Lakeside High School. Their colors were purple & gold. Wenner Field, the location of Harbor's football games, was at 1700 W. 10th Street.

Ashtabula High School

Ashtabula High School was a public high school that also served the city, operating from the mid-1800s until it was also closed in 2001 as part of the consolidation. Their colors were black & gold.

== Athletics ==
Lakeside High School currently offers:

- Baseball
- Basketball
- Cheerleading
- Football
- Soccer
- Softball
- Swimming and diving
- Tennis
- Track and field
- Volleyball
- Wrestling
