= WKKY =

- Geneva, Ohio; United States
- Broadcast area: Lake County; Ashtabula County; Greater Cleveland (limited)
- Frequency: 104.7 MHz (HD Radio)
- Branding: Country 104.7 WKKY

Programming
- Format: Country music
- Affiliations: Cleveland Browns Radio Network; ABC News Radio

Ownership
- Owner: Music Express Broadcasting Corporation of Northeast Ohio
- Sister stations: WQGR

History
- First air date: April 28, 1982
- Former call signs: WDON (1987–1992)
- Former frequencies: 104.9 MHz (1987–1991)

Technical information
- Licensing authority: FCC
- Facility ID: 47103
- Class: A
- ERP: 6,000 watts
- HAAT: 100 meters (330 ft)
- Transmitter coordinates: 41°47′31″N 81°5′30″W

Links
- Public license information: Public file; LMS
- Webcast: Listen Live
- Website: wkky.com

WKKY (104.7 FM) is a commercial FM radio station licensed to Geneva, Ohio, United States. WKKY is owned by the Music Express Broadcasting Corporation, with a country music format. WKKY's studios are located in Geneva, while the transmitter resides in Madison Township. WKKY broadcasts over one HD Radio subchannel and is available online.

== History ==
The station signed on April 28, 1982 as WDON, named after station founder Donald E. Martin, on a frequency of 104.9 MHz. On September 16, 1987, Martin organized Ray-Mar Broadcasting Company, which was subsequently sold to the Music Express Broadcasting Corp, who owned nearby station WATJ in Chardon. In 1991, nearby radio station WZLE in Lorain (which operated on the same frequency as WDON) raised its tower height and expanding its signal. Due to this change, WDON experienced major co-channel interference issues, which led to WDON changing its frequency to 104.7, and boosting the signal output to its current level of 6,000 watts. The station's call letters were changed to WKKY on July 10, 1992.

On May 2, 2025, Music Express Broadcasting acquired station WQGR from Media One Radio Group (who would sell its Ashtabula stations to Lilly Broadcasting several months later); the deal closed on June 26 of that year.
