= WFUN (AM) =

Radio station in Ashtabula, Ohio

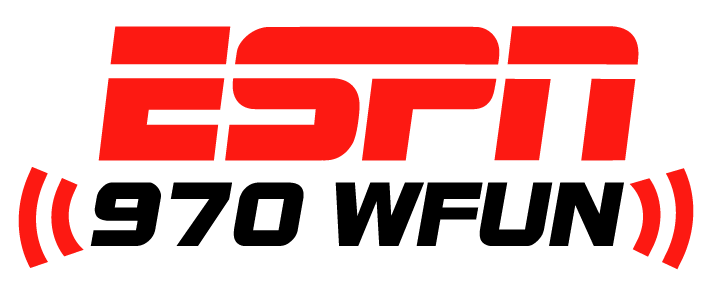
- Ashtabula, Ohio; United States
- Broadcast area: Erie, Pennsylvania
- Frequency: 970 kHz
- Branding: ESPN 970 WFUN

Programming
- Format: Sports
- Affiliations: ESPN Radio

Ownership
- Owner: Lilly Broadcasting; (Glenora Radio Network LLC)
- Sister stations: WFXJ-FM; WREO-FM; WYBL; WZOO-FM

History
- First air date: September 21, 1937
- Former call signs: WICA (1937–1960); WREO (1960–1978)
- Call sign meaning: The fun spot on your dial

Technical information
- Licensing authority: FCC
- Facility ID: 54565
- Class: B
- Power: 5,000 watts (day); 1,000 watts (night)
- Transmitter coordinates: 41°48′52.19″N 80°46′44.31″W

Links
- Public license information: Public file; LMS
- Webcast: Listen live
- Website: wfun970.com

WFUN (970 AM, "ESPN 970") is a commercial radio station licensed to Ashtabula, Ohio, United States. Owned by Lilly Broadcasting, it serves Ashtabula County, Ohio, and parts of the Erie, Pennsylvania, region. It is one of five stations in Lilly's Ashtabula cluster, the others being WFXJ-FM, WREO-FM, WYBL, and WZOO-FM.

== History ==
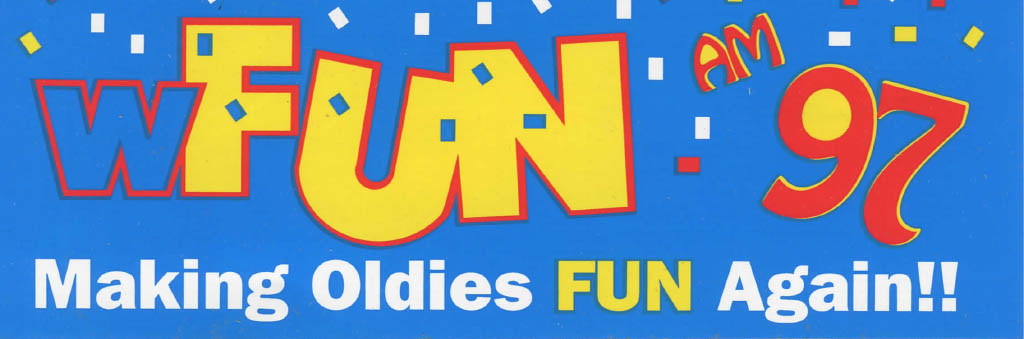
WFUN (AM) Logo Used During The 1990s

The station signed on the air in 1937 as WICA (its call letters having stood for "Industry, Commerce, Agriculture"). WICA started an FM sister station, WICA-FM, on 103.7 MHz around 1950. WICA-FM's frequency soon thereafter moved to 97.1 MHz, duplicating the programming of the AM station. Both AM and FM stations were owned by Richard D. and David C. Rowley since their inception.

WICA and WICA-FM later became WREO and WREO-FM, taking their calls from the company name Radio Enterprises of Ohio, Inc. (albeit being formally formed on October 7, 1986). WREO would change its call sign to WFUN on July 3, 1978, taking the call letters of a legendary AM Top 40 station in Miami, Florida, while eventually adopting an oldies format. The WREO-FM call sign was retained by the sister FM station, which continues today with a classic hits format. Steve Szabo was hired for Program Director and morning drive personality. Rob Rich, Barry Sparkles, Big Lou and Rose Kay rounded out the air staff.

In May 2000, the Rowleys sold the stations and WZOO-FM to Clear Channel Communications. WFUN's oldies format was dropped in February 2001 for a standard news/talk format (Rush Limbaugh's show was the only one retained, as WFUN aired it since the early 1990s), adding Dr. Laura, Jim Rome, Coast to Coast AM and Fox Sports Radio. Morning drive on the station remained local throughout this time, evolving into basic a local news and political talk show hosted by Roger McCoy and later by John Broom.

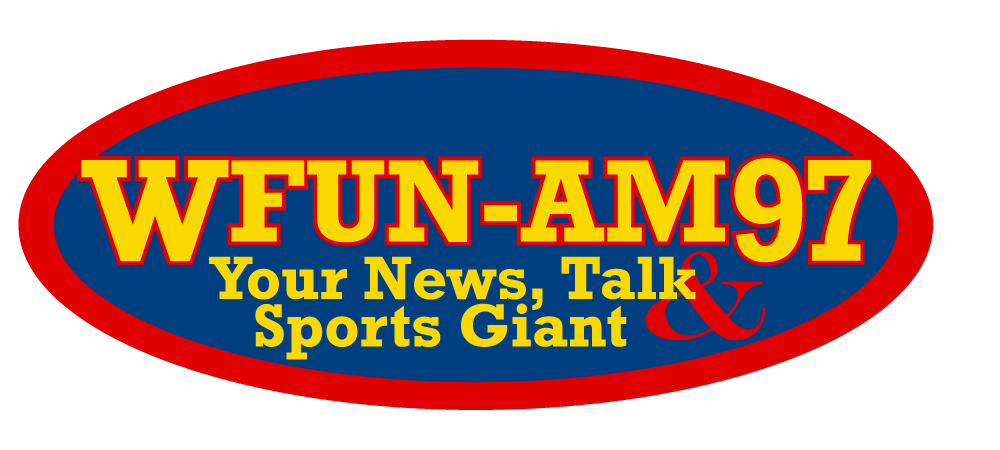
WFUN (AM) Logo From 2000 to 2007

Clear Channel Communications sold their Ashtabula cluster, including WFUN, in September 2007 to Media One Radio Group (headed by Embrescia and dubbed "Sweet Home Ashtabula" as a placeholder). WFUN's programming changed on November 3, 2007, over to a sports/talk format affiliated with ESPN Radio, dropping all political talk programming and electing to go for a smaller, male dominated, core audience.

Since 2012, WFUN has served as the ESPN Radio affiliate for Erie, Pennsylvania, due to WRIE taking the CBS Sports Radio affiliation. In August 2021, the Erie Otters announced a radio broadcast partnership with WFUN beginning in the 2021-2022 OHL season.

Lilly Broadcasting, owner of WICU-TV and operator of WSEE-TV in Erie, Pennsylvania, acquired Media One's radio stations in Ashtabula and Jamestown, New York, in December 2025 for a combined $4 million.

== WICA-TV ==
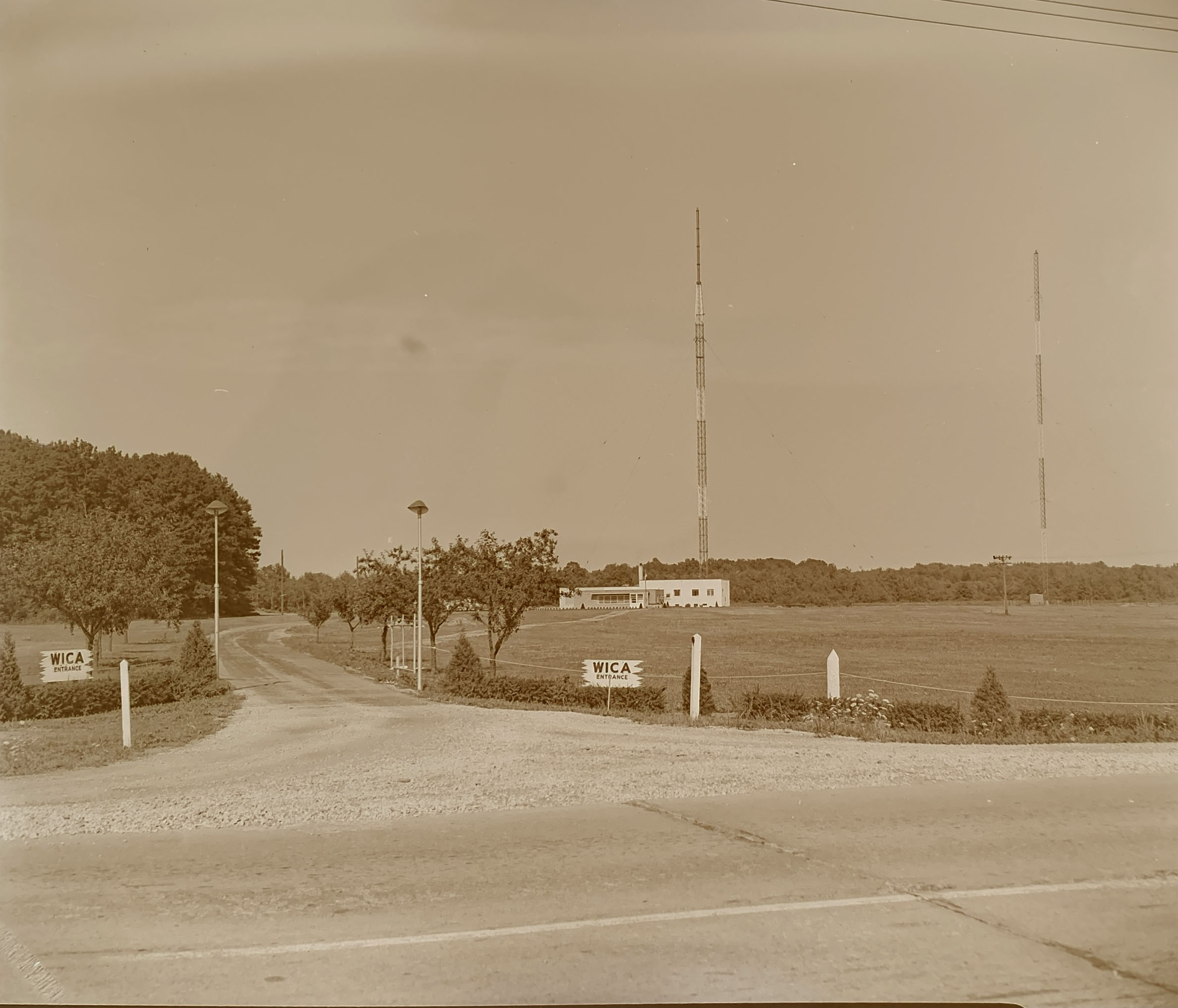
WICA-AM-FM-TV Studios & Transmitter Site Circa 1953

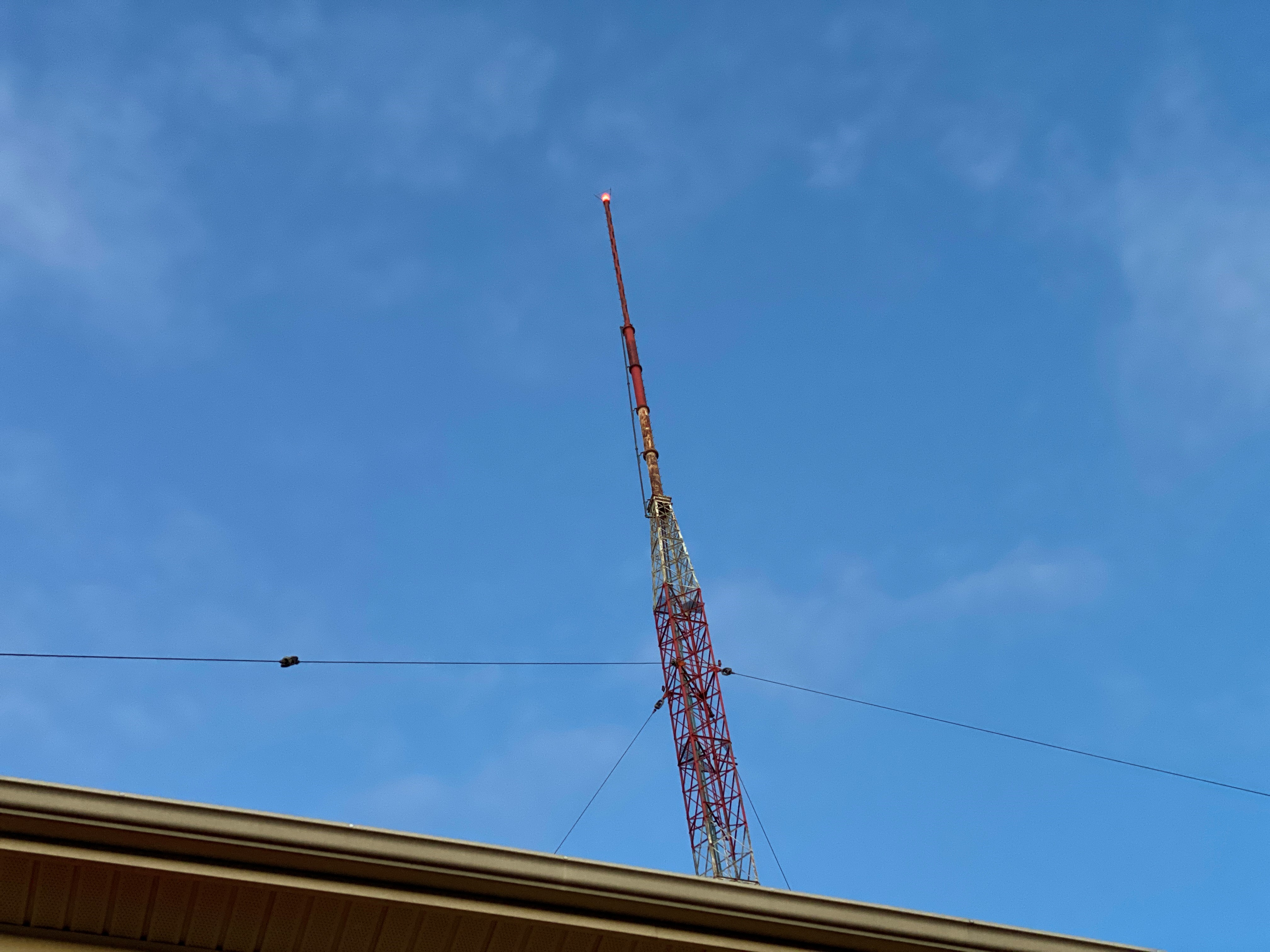
Former WICA-TV Antenna Atop The WFUN (AM) North Tower

Richard D. and David C. Rowley, the founders of WICA-AM-FM, also started WICA-TV on channel 15 in the 1950s. Hampered both by broadcasting on the (then relatively unknown) UHF dial, and with no network affiliation of any sort, WICA-TV had limited broadcast hours, a sparse and often overused film library, and a heavy amount of local programming (usually filmed with only one camera). WICA-TV started broadcasting on September 19, 1953, but quietly signed off around June 21, 1956.

The Rowley family then reactivated WICA-TV on April 4, 1966, with an intent of donating it as a non-profit educational license. As was in its first incarnation, WICA-TV was again hampered with no network programming, an often overused and limited film library of mediocre and low rental fare. In addition, WICA-TV still broadcast only in black-and-white when most stations already converted to color (WQEX in Pittsburgh was the last licensed television station to convert in 1986.) and still filmed local programming with only one camera.

WICA-TV signed off for good on December 26, 1967, with its license returned to the FCC. The UHF antenna is the sole remaining element of WICA-TV's existence, still affixed to the north tower of the WFUN array.
