= WREO-FM =

Radio station in Ashtabula, Ohio

- Ashtabula, Ohio; United States
- Broadcast area: Ashtabula, Ohio; Erie metro area (limited); Greater Cleveland (limited)
- Frequency: 97.1 MHz
- Branding: Mix 97.1

Programming
- Format: Classic hits
- Affiliations: Ohio State Sports Network

Ownership
- Owner: Lilly Broadcasting; (Glenora Radio Network LLC)
- Sister stations: WFUN; WFXJ-FM; WYBL; WZOO-FM

History
- First air date: February 17, 1949
- Former call signs: WICA-FM (1949–1960)
- Former frequencies: 103.7 MHz (1949–1960)
- Call sign meaning: "Radio Enterprises of Ohio"

Technical information
- Licensing authority: FCC
- Facility ID: 54566
- Class: B
- ERP: 50,000 watts
- HAAT: 152 meters (499 ft)
- Transmitter coordinates: 41°48′58.00″N 80°46′52.00″W

Links
- Public license information: Public file; LMS
- Webcast: Listen live
- Website: mix971fm.com

WREO-FM (97.1 FM, "Mix 97.1") is a radio station broadcasting a classic hits format licensed to Ashtabula, Ohio, United States. It is one of five stations in Lilly's Ashtabula cluster, the others being WFUN, WFXJ-FM, WYBL, and WZOO-FM.

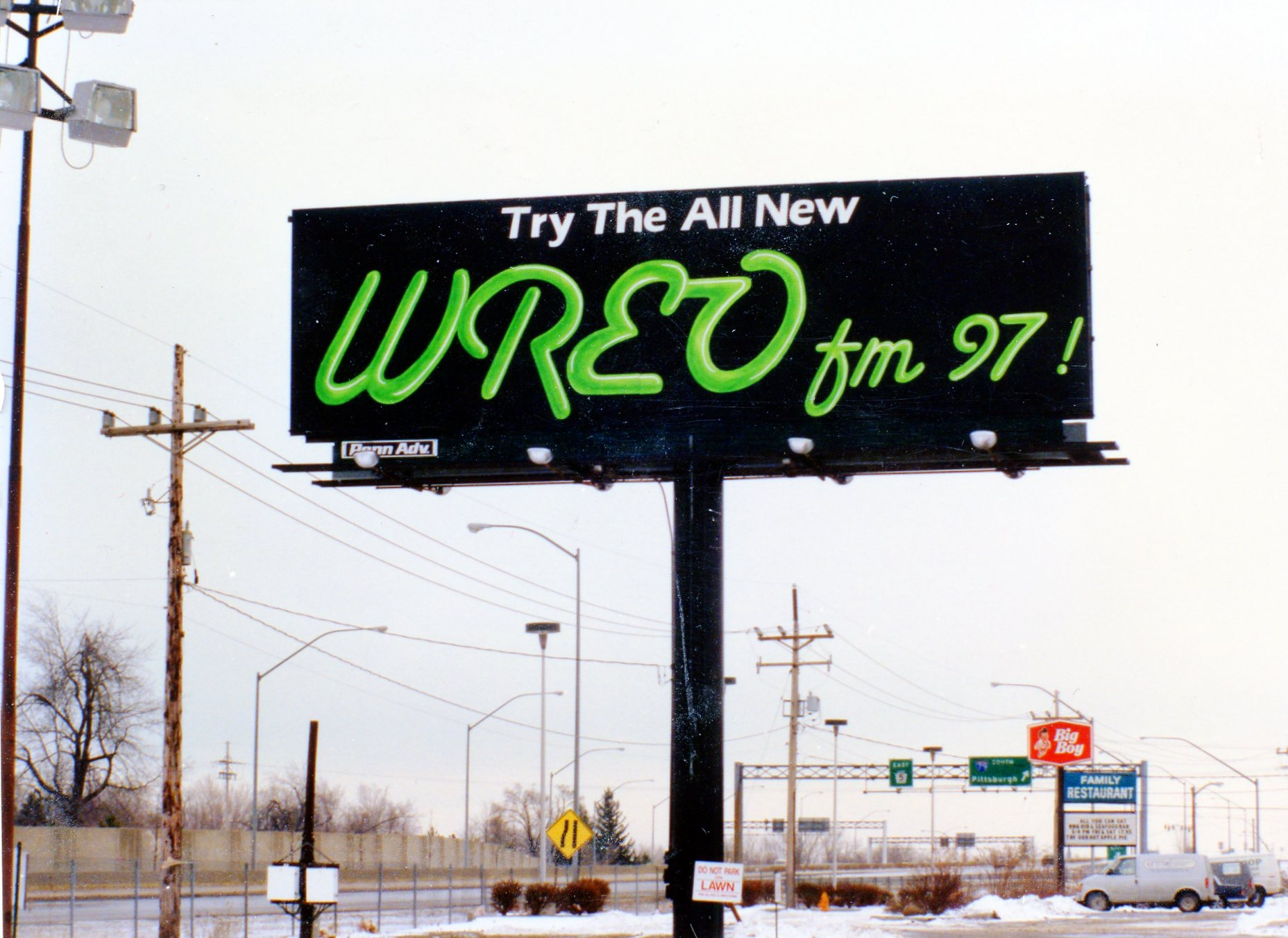
WREO-FM Billboard Circa 1992

For many years, WREO broadcast an easy listening format. It moved with the trends of "office-safe" stations beginning in the early 1990s, converting to Smooth jazz in the early 1990s, adult contemporary in the spring of 1992, then switching to Hot AC in summer 2013. During the AC era, it branded as "Star 97.1", then switched to the "Mix 97.1" branding upon the Hot AC switch. On September 6, 2021, the station switched to a playlist with a more "Lite Rock" sound as "Lite Mix 97.1" with legendary Cleveland broadcaster Ted Alexander II serving as Program Director. Through it all, the heritage WREO-FM calls have been retained.

Most of the station's programming is locally originated, either live or through advanced voice tracking, along with local news, weather and traffic coverage, and local community service features. Syndicated programming over the weekend includes the Rick Dees Weekly Top 40, The John Tesh Radio Show, and Backtracks USA.

Because of the station's large signal range (formerly branded as "Powerhouse Of The North Coast") which also easily covers the eastern portion of the Greater Cleveland area, along with all of Erie County, Pennsylvania, it is heavily competitive with Erie's in-city stations, sometimes topping them in Nielsen Media (and in the past, Arbitron) ratings. It also has good listenership across Lake Erie in London, Ontario and into the Youngstown/Warren metro to the south, and some fringe coverage into western New York. The station maintains a weather partnership with Cleveland CBS affiliate WOIO (Channel 19), and a branding partnership with the Ashtabula County Medical Center, including studio sponsorship.

During May 2025, WREO shifted their format to classic hits, dropping "Lite" from their branding.

Lilly Broadcasting, owner of WICU-TV and operator of WSEE-TV in Erie, Pennsylvania, acquired Media One's radio stations in Ashtabula and Jamestown, New York, in December 2025 for a combined $4 million.
