= North Kingsville, Ohio =

- Village
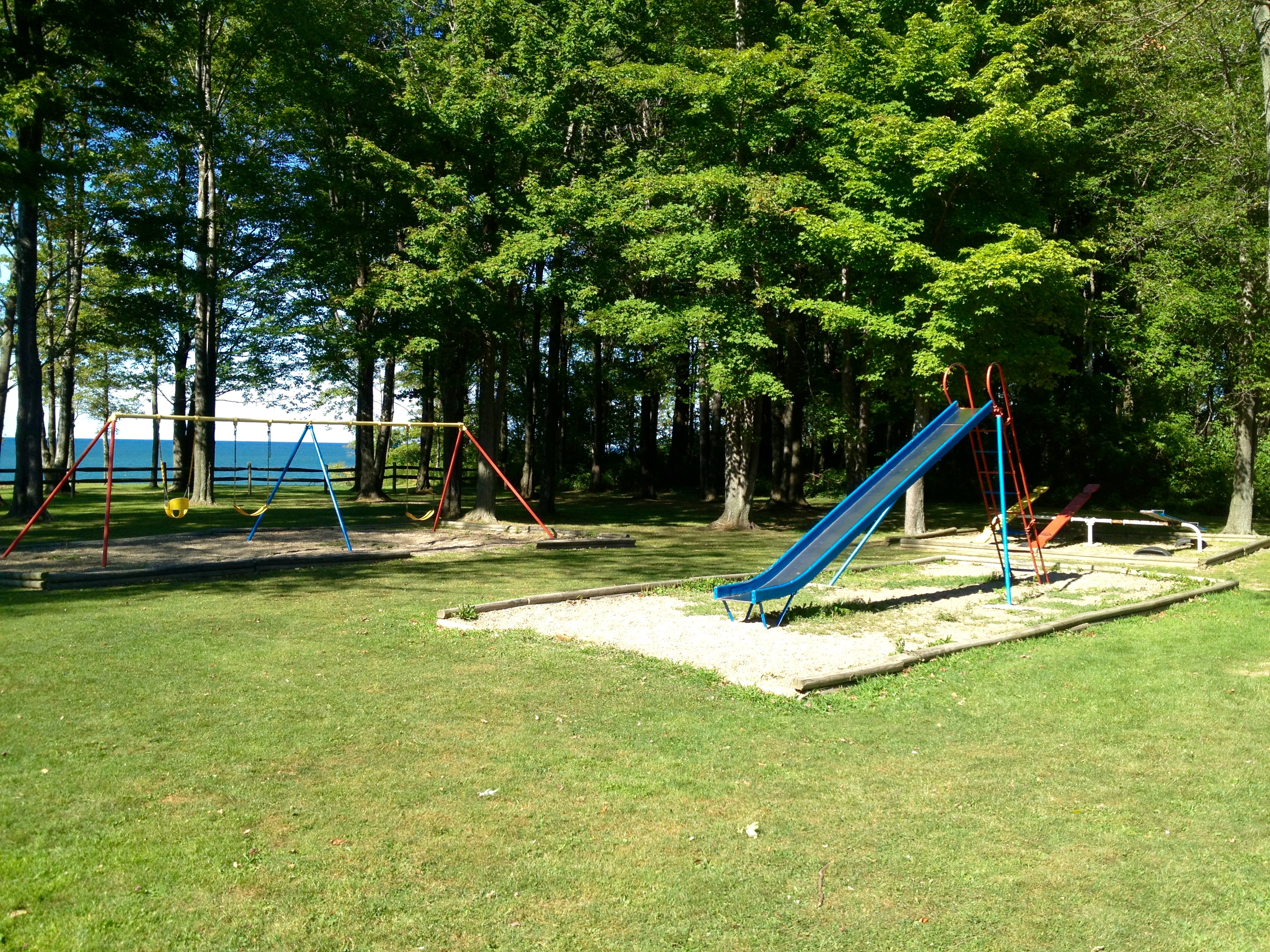
- Sunset Park playground in North Kingsville

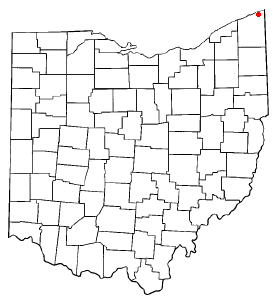
- Location of North Kingsville, Ohio

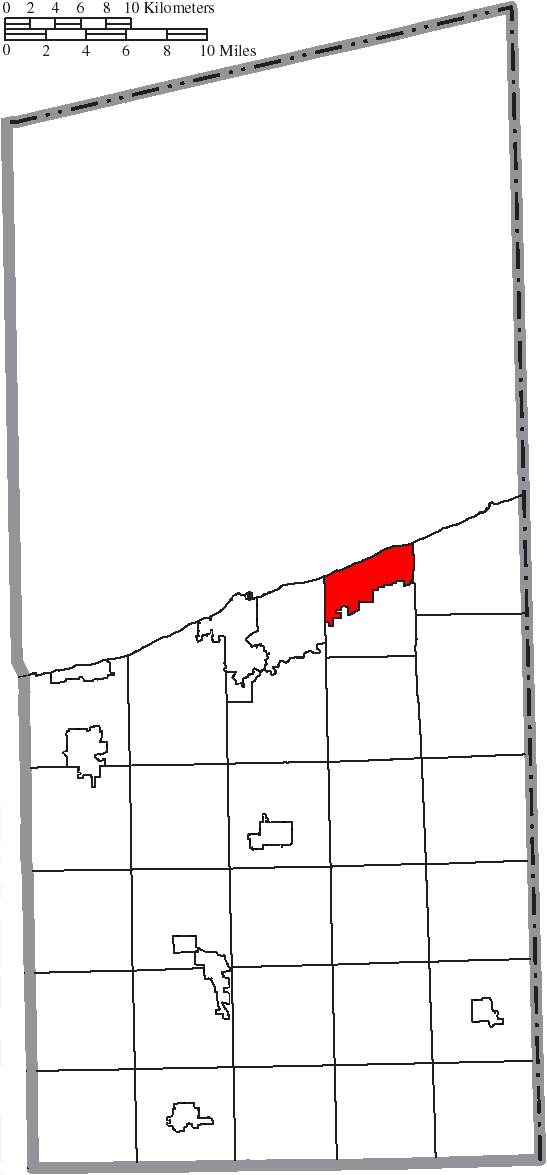
- Location of North Kingsville in Ashtabula County
- Coordinates: 41°54′21″N 80°41′25″W
- Country: United States
- State: Ohio
- County: Ashtabula

Area
  - Total: 8.87 sq mi (22.98 km^{2})
  - Land: 8.85 sq mi (22.93 km^{2})
  - Water: 0.019 sq mi (0.05 km^{2})
- Elevation: 709 ft (216 m)

Population (2020)
  - Total: 2,742
  - Density: 309.7/sq mi (119.56/km^{2})
- Time zone: UTC-5 (Eastern (EST))
  - Summer (DST): UTC-4 (EDT)
- ZIP code: 44068
- Area code: 440
- FIPS code: 39-56700
- GNIS feature ID: 1056455
- Website: northkingsvilleohio.org

North Kingsville is a village in Ashtabula County, Ohio, United States. The population was 2,742 at the 2020 census.

== Geography ==
According to the United States Census Bureau, the village has a total area of 8.91 square miles (23.08 km^{2}), of which 8.89 square miles (23.02 km^{2}) is land and 0.02 square miles (0.05 km^{2}) is water.

The settlement of Kingsville-on-the-Lake is located in North Kingsville.

== Demographics ==
Historical population
| Census | Pop. | Note | %± |
|---|---|---|---|
| 1920 | 598 | | — |
| 1930 | 853 | | 42.6% |
| 1940 | 834 | | −2.2% |
| 1950 | 1,271 | | 52.4% |
| 1960 | 1,854 | | 45.9% |
| 1970 | 2,458 | | 32.6% |
| 1980 | 2,939 | | 19.6% |
| 1990 | 2,672 | | −9.1% |
| 2000 | 2,658 | | −0.5% |
| 2010 | 2,923 | | 10.0% |
| 2020 | 2,742 | | −6.2% |
U.S. Decennial Census

=== 2010 census ===
As of the census of 2010, there were 2,923 people, 1,150 households, and 874 families living in the village. The population density was 328.8 inhabitants per square mile (127.0/km^{2}). There were 1,294 housing units at an average density of 145.6 per square mile (56.2/km^{2}). The racial makeup of the village was 96.5% White, 0.7% African American, 0.1% Native American, 1.2% Asian, 0.2% Pacific Islander, 0.2% from other races, and 1.1% from two or more races. Hispanic or Latino of any race were 1.5% of the population.

There were 1,150 households, of which 32.1% had children under the age of 18 living with them, 61.7% were married couples living together, 9.7% had a female householder with no husband present, 4.6% had a male householder with no wife present, and 24.0% were non-families. 19.5% of all households were made up of individuals, and 8.2% had someone living alone who was 65 years of age or older. The average household size was 2.53 and the average family size was 2.86.

The median age in the village was 44.8 years. 23% of residents were under the age of 18; 6.5% were between the ages of 18 and 24; 20.7% were from 25 to 44; 33.8% were from 45 to 64; and 15.9% were 65 years of age or older. The gender makeup of the village was 48.8% male and 51.2% female.

=== 2000 census ===
As of the census of 2000, there were 2,658 people, 1,029 households, and 807 families living in the village. The population density was 298.5 inhabitants per square mile (115.3/km^{2}). There were 1,127 housing units at an average density of 126.6 per square mile (48.9/km^{2}). The racial makeup of the village was 97.55% White, 0.38% African American, 0.23% Native American, 0.56% Asian, 0.41% from other races, and 0.87% from two or more races. Hispanic or Latino of any race were 1.17% of the population. 16.2% were of German, 15.6% English, 14.9% Italian, 12.0% American, 9.3% Irish and 5.2% Finnish ancestry according to Census 2000.

There were 1,029 households, out of which 33.1% had children under the age of 18 living with them, 66.4% were married couples living together, 8.3% had a female householder with no husband present, and 21.5% were non-families. 17.4% of all households were made up of individuals, and 7.2% had someone living alone who was 65 years of age or older. The average household size was 2.58 and the average family size was 2.91.

In the village, the population was spread out, with 24.5% under the age of 18, 6.3% from 18 to 24, 27.9% from 25 to 44, 28.5% from 45 to 64, and 12.8% who were 65 years of age or older. The median age was 41 years. For every 100 females there were 96.3 males. For every 100 females age 18 and over, there were 94.2 males.

The median income for a household in the village was $44,276, and the median income for a family was $52,417. Males had a median income of $39,479 versus $26,250 for females. The per capita income for the village was $23,000. About 4.9% of families and 7.0% of the population were below the poverty line, including 11.9% of those under age 18 and 2.1% of those age 65 or over.
