= Edgewood, Ohio =

- Census-designated place
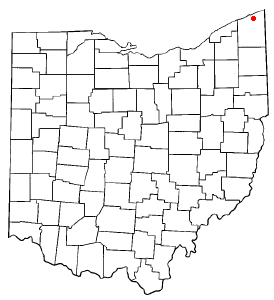
- Location of Edgewood, Ohio
- Coordinates: 41°52′26″N 80°45′28″W
- Country: United States
- State: Ohio
- County: Ashtabula
- Township: Ashtabula

Area
  - Total: 6.85 sq mi (17.73 km^{2})
  - Land: 6.84 sq mi (17.71 km^{2})
  - Water: 0.0077 sq mi (0.02 km^{2})
- Elevation: 699 ft (213 m)

Population (2020)
  - Total: 4,185
  - Density: 611.9/sq mi (236.27/km^{2})
- Time zone: UTC-5 (Eastern (EST))
  - Summer (DST): UTC-4 (EDT)
- ZIP code: 44004
- Area code: 440
- FIPS code: 39-24542
- GNIS feature ID: 2392988

Edgewood is a census-designated place (CDP) in Ashtabula Township, Ashtabula County, Ohio, United States. The population was 4,185 at the 2020 census.

== Geography ==
According to the United States Census Bureau, the CDP has a total area of 6.8 square miles (17.7 km^{2}), of which 0.0077 square miles (0.02 km^{2}), or 0.09%, is water.

== Demographics ==
Historical population
Census	Pop.	Note	%±
2020	4,185		—
U.S. Decennial Census

=== 2020 census ===
As of the 2020 census, Edgewood had a population of 4,185. The median age was 45.2 years. 20.8% of residents were under the age of 18 and 21.8% of residents were 65 years of age or older. For every 100 females there were 98.6 males, and for every 100 females age 18 and over there were 94.8 males age 18 and over.

87.7% of residents lived in urban areas, while 12.3% lived in rural areas.

There were 1,855 households in Edgewood, of which 23.9% had children under the age of 18 living in them. Of all households, 38.9% were married-couple households, 22.3% were households with a male householder and no spouse or partner present, and 30.7% were households with a female householder and no spouse or partner present. About 34.0% of all households were made up of individuals and 15.2% had someone living alone who was 65 years of age or older.

There were 2,019 housing units, of which 8.1% were vacant. The homeowner vacancy rate was 2.0% and the rental vacancy rate was 8.5%.

Racial composition as of the 2020 census
Race	Number	Percent
White	3,648	87.2%
Black or African American	98	2.3%
American Indian and Alaska Native	3	0.1%
Asian	21	0.5%
Native Hawaiian and Other Pacific Islander	0	0.0%
Some other race	48	1.1%
Two or more races	367	8.8%
Hispanic or Latino (of any race)	222	5.3%

=== 2000 census ===
As of the 2000 census, there were 4,762 people, 2,048 households, and 1,357 families residing in the CDP. The population density was 705.7 inhabitants per square mile (272.5/km^{2}). There were 2,157 housing units at an average density of 319.7 per square mile (123.4/km^{2}). The racial makeup of the CDP was 96.77% White, 1.26% African American, 0.13% Native American, 0.71% Asian, 0.23% from other races, and 0.90% from two or more races. Hispanic or Latino people of any race were 1.13% of the population. 21.6% were of German, 12.4% Italian, 10.8% English, 9.6% Irish, 7.6% American and 5.6% Finnish ancestry according to Census 2000.

There were 2,048 households, out of which 26.5% had children under the age of 18 living with them, 51.1% were married couples living together, 11.8% had a female householder with no husband present, and 33.7% were non-families. 29.0% of all households were made up of individuals, and 12.4% had someone living alone who was 65 years of age or older. The average household size was 2.31 and the average family size was 2.82.

In the CDP, the population was spread out, with 21.5% under the age of 18, 7.2% from 18 to 24, 27.5% from 25 to 44, 25.9% from 45 to 64, and 17.8% who were 65 years of age or older. The median age was 41 years. For every 100 females, there were 93.3 males. For every 100 females age 18 and over, there were 92.6 males.

The median income for a household in the CDP is $40,170, and the median income for a family was $46,470. Males had a median income of $36,319 versus $21,985 for females. The per capita income for the CDP was $19,415. About 3.1% of families and 6.8% of the population were below the poverty line, including 5.5% of those under age 18 and 7.9% of those age 65 or over.

== See also ==
- List of census-designated places in Ohio
