= Mary E. Hazeltine =

American librarian

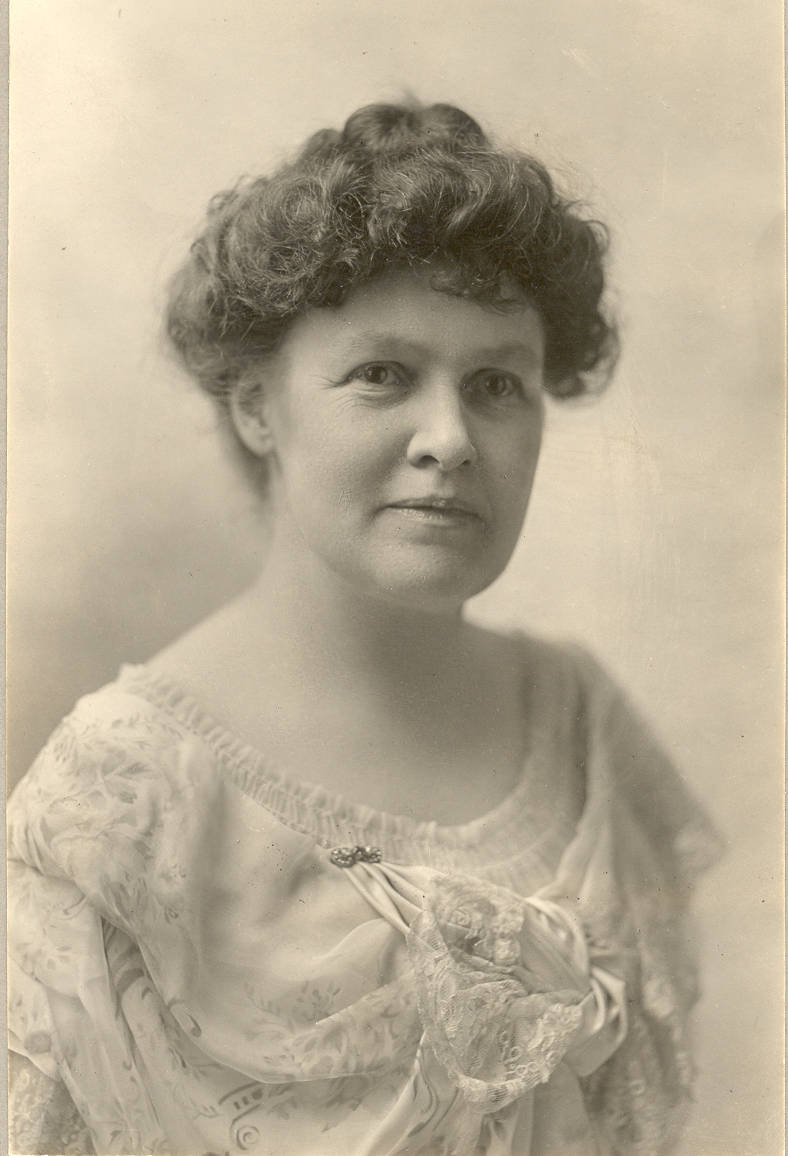
- Born: May 5, 1868
- Died: June 17, 1949 (aged 81)
- Education: Wellesley College
- Occupation: Librarian

Mary Emogene Hazeltine (May 5, 1868 – June 17, 1949) was an American librarian.

== Biography ==
Mary Emogene Hazeltine was born in Jamestown, New York to Abner Hazeltine and Olivia Brown Hazeltine. She graduated from Wellesley College, Massachusetts with her bachelor's degree in 1891 and served as the librarian for the James Prendergast Library in Jamestown, New York from 1893 to 1906. During that time she also organized and directed the Chautauqua School for Librarians in the summers from 1901 to 1905. In 1906 Hazeltine moved to Wisconsin to be the first head of the Wisconsin Library School established in Madison, Wisconsin. The School was created by the Wisconsin Free Library Commission. She directed the Library School at Madison from 1906 to 1938.

She was president of the New York Library Association in 1902 and was an active leader of the Wisconsin Library Association and the American Library Association. Hazeltine retired from the Library School at Madison in 1938 and returned to her family home in Jamestown, New York. In 1951 she was one of 40 of the United States' most significant library leaders selected by the Library Journal for inclusion in a "Library Hall of Fame". Hazeltine was inducted into the Wisconsin Library Hall of Fame in 2008.

== Publications ==
- "How to Conduct a Dramatic Reading", Bulletin of the New Hampshire Public Libraries. 1914
- Fundamentals of Reference Service (1922)
- "The Librarian's Duty To The Profession", Bulletin of the New Hampshire Public Libraries. 1922
- Anniversaries and Holidays (1928)
- One Hundred Years of Wisconsin Authorship, 1837–1937 (1937)
- She contributed numerous articles to professional journals and to the Encyclopædia Britannica
