= JEP =

JEP may refer to:

== Science and technology ==
- Java Embedding Plugin, which enables Java on Mac OS X with non Safari browsers
- JDK Enhancement Proposal, a process used by the OpenJDK community for collecting proposals for enhancements to the Java Development Kit
- Jabber Enhancement Proposals, in the Extensible Messaging and Presence Protocol XMPP
- Joint embedding property, a property of a class of models in universal algebra and model theory

== Other ==
- Jamestown Engine Plant, an engine manufacturing plant in Jamestown, New York owned by Cummins
- Jep!, a children's version of Jeopardy!
- Jersey Evening Post, a newspaper covering Jersey
- Jersey pound, the currency of Jersey
- Journal of Economic Perspectives, a publication of the American Economic Association
- JEP (Jewish Education Program), a Jewish religious education outreach program
- Jep Gambardella is the main character of the 2013 Italian film The Great Beauty
- Special Jurisdiction for Peace (Spanish: Jurisdicción Especial para la Paz, JEP), a Colombian transitional justice mechanism
