= Bush Elementary School =

Bush Elementary School may refer to the following primary schools in the United States:

Arizona

- Barbara Bush Elementary School (Mesa) - Mesa Public Schools
- Maxine O. Bush Elementary School (Phoenix) - Roosevelt Elementary School District

California

- George W. Bush Elementary School (Stockton) - Stockton Unified School District

Idaho

- A. H. Bush Elementary School (Idaho Falls) - Idaho Falls School District (D91)

Illinois

- Gordon Bush Elementary School (East St. Louis) - East St. Louis School District 189

Kentucky

- Bush Elementary School (London) - Laurel County Public Schools

Michigan

- W. R. Bush Elementary School (Essexville) - Essexville-Hampton Public Schools

Missouri

- Bush Elementary School (Fulton) - Fulton 58 School District

New York

- Clinton V. Bush Elementary School (Jamestown) - Jamestown Public Schools

Oregon

- Asahel Bush Elementary School (Salem) - Salem-Keizer School District (24J)

Texas

- Audrey Judy Bush Elementary School (Houston) - Alief Independent School District
- Barbara Pierce Bush Elementary School (The Woodlands) - Conroe Independent School District
- George Herbert Walker Bush Elementary School (Addison) - Dallas Independent School District
- Global Leadership Academy at Barbara Bush Elementary (Grand Prairie) - Grand Prairie Independent School District
- Barbara Pierce Bush Elementary School (Houston) - Houston Independent School District
- Laura Welch Bush Elementary School (Travis County) - Leander Independent School District
- George H. W. Bush Elementary School (Midland) - Midland Independent School District
- Laura Welch Bush Elementary School (Houston) - Pasadena Independent School District
- George W. Bush Elementary School (St. Paul) - Wylie Independent School District
