= Samuel Carlson =

Samuel Carlson may refer to:

- Samuel A. Carlson (1868–1961), American politician
- Sam Carlson (born 1998), American baseball player
- Sammy Carlson (born 1989), American freestyle skier
