= James Prendergast Library =

Association library in Jamestown, New York

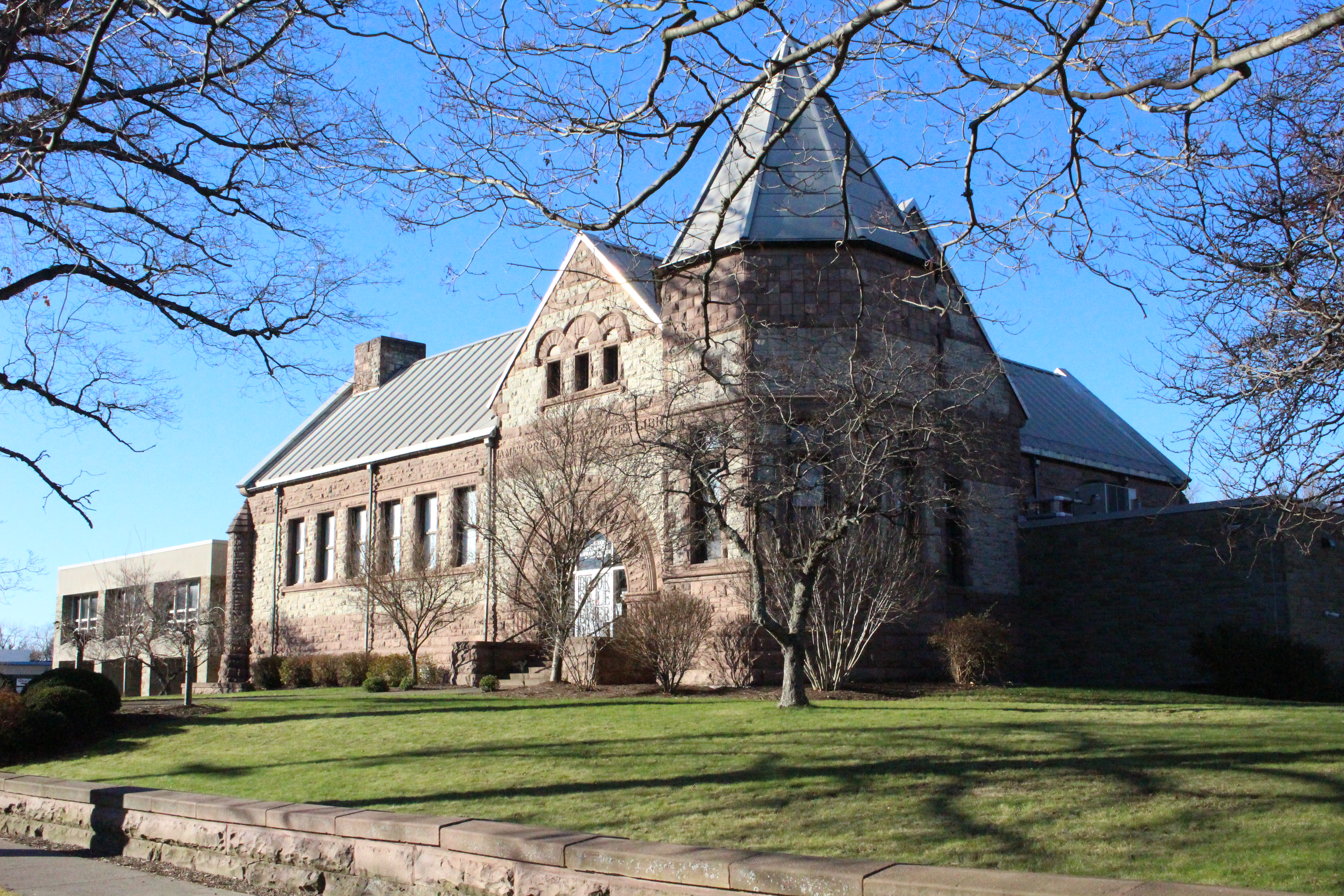
- South side of Prendergast Library facing 5th Street
- 42.09832631195173°N 79.24326845819566°W
- Location: Jamestown, New York, United States
- Established: 1880

Collection
- Size: 134,733

Other information
- Director: Tress Williams
- Website: www.prendergastlibrary.org

The James Prendergast Library is an association library located in Jamestown, New York. On the day it opened its doors to the public, December 1, 1891, The Evening Journal noted, "The opening of the Prendergast Library marks an important epoch in our local history. Few communities can boast so magnificent a public gift."

The mission of the James Prendergast Library is to responsibly empower lifelong learning for the residents of the City of Jamestown.

As of 2022, the library contained 134,147 individual physical works and received 101,150 visitors. The current executive director is Tress Williams, who was appointed by the board of trustees in February 2025.

== History ==
On December 21, 1879, James Prendergast, 31, a prominent lawyer and grandson of James Prendergast, the founder of Jamestown, unexpectedly died in Buffalo, NY, while being treated for an illness. He had begun to write a will, but it was not complete when he died. While arranging James' business affairs, his business partner, Eleazer Green, discovered a memorandum that James wished the income from his business interests, the Prendergast block, be used to establish a free library in Jamestown. On January 1, 1880, eleven days after his death, It was announced that James' parents, Alexander and Mary Prendergast, had already taken steps to ensure that their son's wishes would "be carried out to the every letter."

On January 29, 1880, the James Prendergast Library Association of Jamestown, New York, was established by special act of the New York State Legislature. The act was signed into law by Gov. Alonzo B. Cornell. The library first opened on December 1, 1891, at a cost of $60,000 for the building and $45,000 for a furnished art gallery. The initial collection comprised 7,555 works under the care of Samuel G. Love.

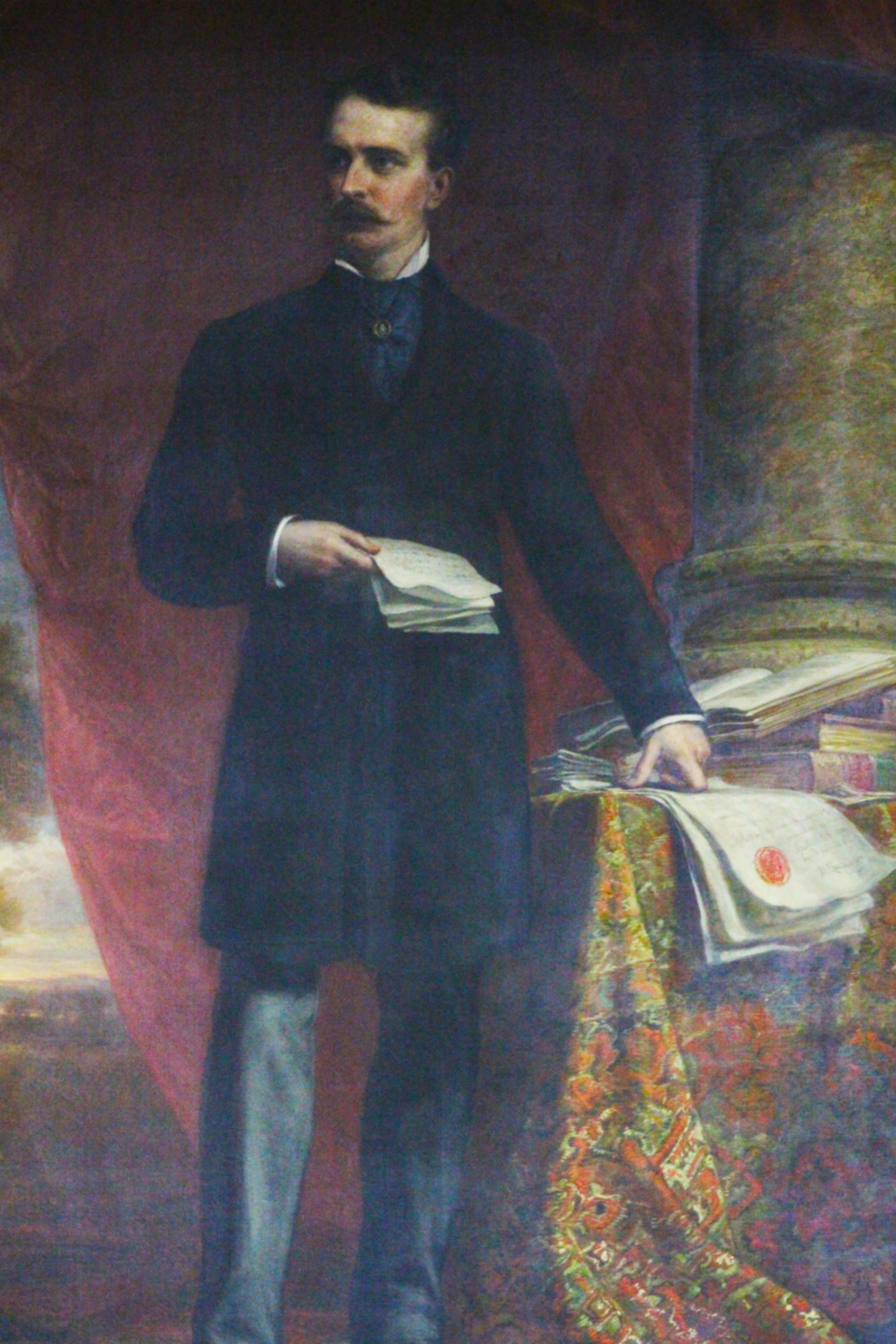
A painting of James Prendergast (d. 1891) which hangs inside the James Prendergast Library in Jamestown, NY.

Constructed by architect A.J. Warner of Rochester, the building had a Richardsonian Romanesque design with rounded arches, Medina sandstone exterior, and turret on the southeast corner. Mary Prendergast specifically dictated that the steps entering the building on the south side be cut from a single stone and that the library be surrounded by a rock wall on three sides.

James Prendergast’s desire to have a free library was an idea ahead of its time. As was noted by the Association’s second librarian, Mary Emogene Hazeltine, “There were no free libraries in the 1870s, as the movement for free circulating books did not even begin until 1876, was barely underway in 1893, and did not gain much head-way until 1900. For this reason, the memorandum found in James Prendergast’s desk, perhaps written as early as 1876 when he built the Prendergast block, proves him to have been a man ahead of his time.”

== Early years ==
Seal of the James Prendergast Library Association, formerly stamped inside of library books.

The libraries first children's room was opened in 1897. Located in the octagonal tower on the southeast corner of the building, the opening celebration was attended by more than 1,000 children.

From the opening in 1891 until 1905, the stacks were closed to the public. The board decided to hold a five-week experiment and announced that as of November 1905 the stacks would be open for public browsing.

On June 19, 1941, through the efforts of E. Snell Hall, the chairman of the library board, and a dedicated number of friends of the library, a new children's room was dedicated. Located in the basement where the old stack space had been, it held up to 18 children at one time.

In 1960, the library joined and became the major central library of the two-county regional Chautauqua-Cattaraugus Library System.

== Renovation & Expansion ==
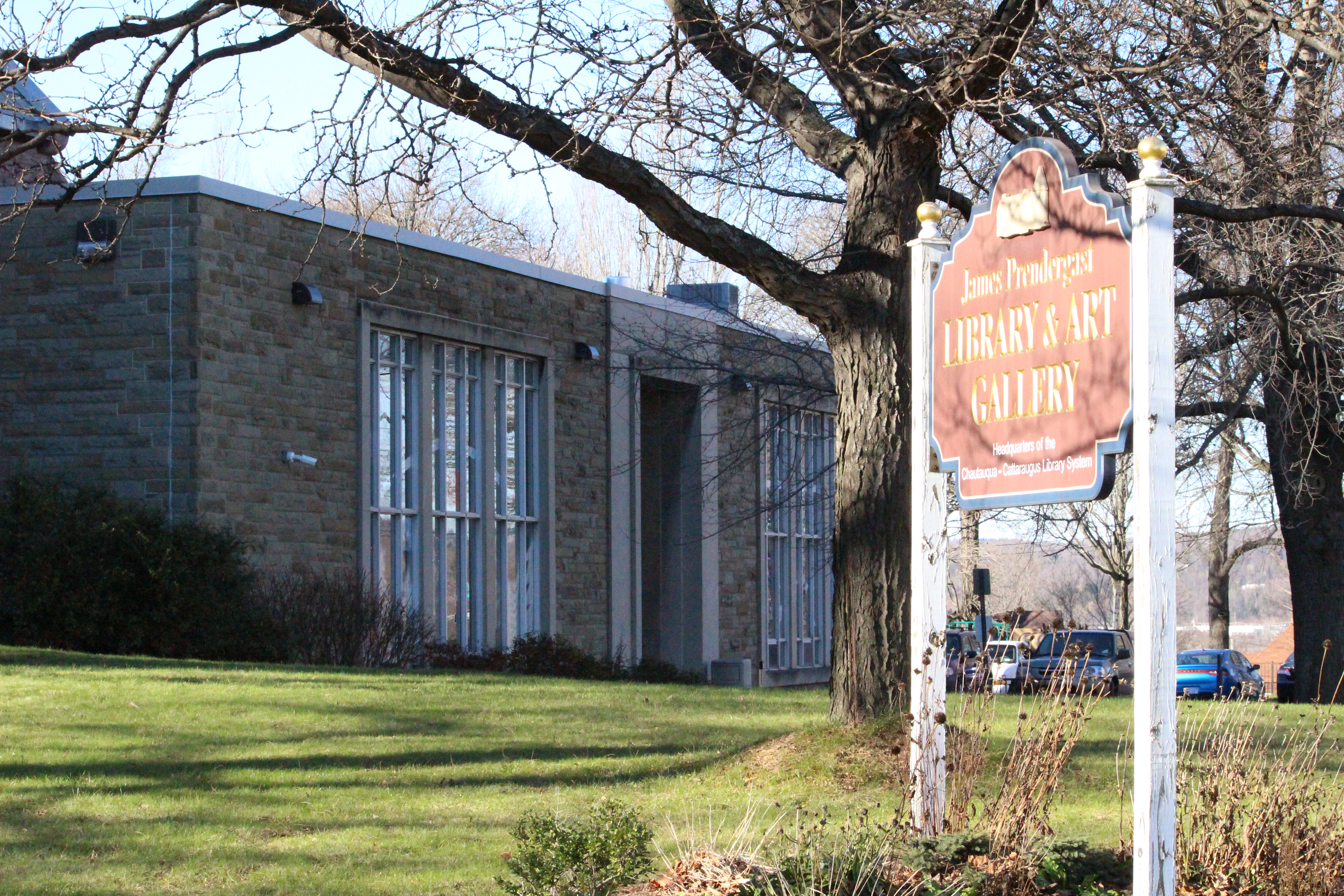
The addition to the library, which was completed in 1968

In 1960, a planned $250,000 expansion to the original building was announced. It was determined that the existing library space, which was handling an annual circulation of 200,000, was less than one-third adequate for operation. The addition was to contain a new main entrance, circulation desk, and all circulation materials. The existing art gallery would remain unchanged, as well as the south side of the building in order to maintain the traditional atmosphere of the library. Ground initially broke in 1961, focusing on a basement level addition and renovation for the newly formed Chautauqua-Cattaraugus Library System. The work continued again in 1968, expanding the library to its current size. All told, 16,500 square feet were added to the library at a cost of $562,000.

== Art Collection ==
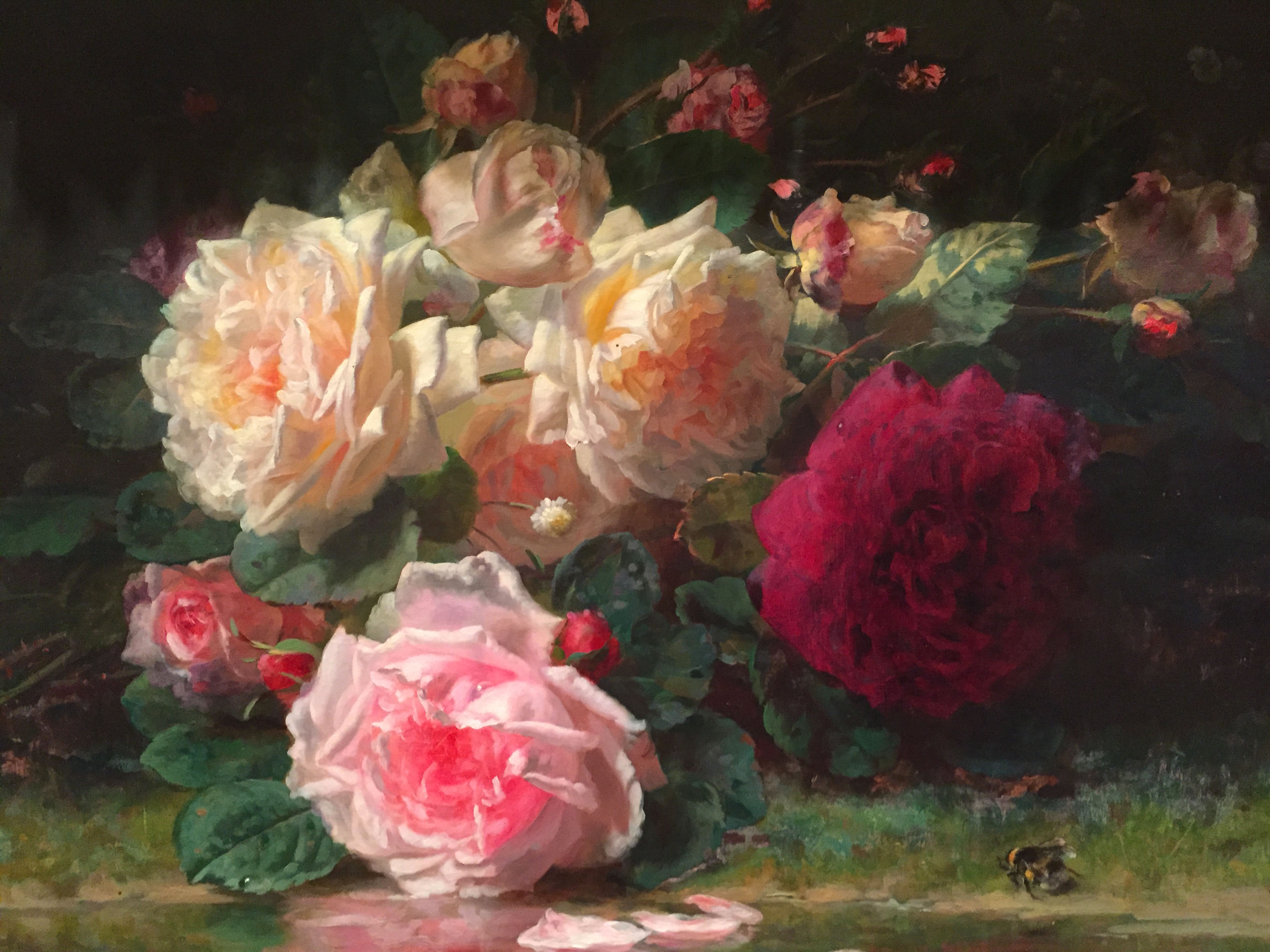
Roses by Jean Baptiste Robie, part of the Prendergast Bequest, now held in a private collection.

Since the opening of the library in 1891, an art gallery has been maintained. In her will, Mary Prendergast directed her executors to purchase paintings, for which she left $25,000, after her death in 1889. Much of the collection consisted of the original paintings with additions bequeathed to the library over the years.

The first pieces of art consisted of 32 oil paintings, most purchased from the J.J. Gillespie Company Fine Art Galleries in Pittsburgh, PA, and most by European artists (Dutch, Spanish, Italian, Belgian, and French). The next pieces of art to be added to the collection were also from the Prendergast's paintings from their personal collection consisting of landscapes of their property and family portraits. In 1960 the collection expanded by nine paintings via a donation by Elizabeth Gillmer Packard of Lakewood, NY. All of these pieces were by American painters.

In 2014, the Library board of trustees began discussing the long-term plan for the art collection, noting that the Library was not able to afford proper care of the artwork. In July, 2015 Sotheby's appraised the artwork and were approved to conduct the auction the following month. After public pushback, the Library board reached an agreement to suspend the sale of the artwork for at least one year while options for keeping the artwork local were sought. In May, 2017, the Library board reached an agreement with New York Attorney General's office stipulating that the Library could sell the artwork, but that the sale must be conducted through "...auction houses of sufficient size and character to market said paintings." This effectively ended any attempt at keeping the artwork local. Over the course of the following two years, the Library was able to sell 44 paintings for nearly $1,000,000. The proceeds were placed in the Library's endowment fund. The pieces of artwork still held by the Library are all directly connected to the Prendergast family.

== Bibliography ==
- The Centennial History of Chautauqua County, Jamestown, NY: The Chautauqua History Company, 1904
- Downs, John, ed. (1921), History of Chautauqua County New York and its People, Boston, New York, Chicago: American Historical Society, Inc.
- Memorials to James Prendergast, Jamestown, NY: Journal Printing Co., 1880
- Descriptive Catalogue of the Art Gallery of the James Prendergast Library Association (Revised ed.), Jamestown, NY: Journal Printing Co., 1906
