= Eddie Sundquist =

American attorney and politician

25th Mayor of Jamestown, New York
- In office January 1, 2020 – January 1, 2024
- Preceded by: Samuel Teresi
- Succeeded by: Kim Ecklund

Personal details
- Born: Edward Anthony Sundquist; December 31, 1988 (age 37) Jamestown, New York, U.S.
- Party: Democratic
- Education: St. John Fisher College (B.A.) University of Pennsylvania (M.Ed.) University at Buffalo (J.D.)

Edward "Eddie" Anthony Sundquist (born December 31, 1988) is an American attorney and politician from the state of New York. A Democrat, he was the 25th mayor of Jamestown, New York, serving from January 1, 2020, to January 1, 2024.

Sundquist was a 2018 candidate for the United States House of Representatives in New York's 23rd congressional district. He was defeated by Democrat Tracy Mitrano in the party's primary on June 26, 2018. On November 6, 2019, he was elected mayor of Jamestown, New York with 49.8% of the vote, defeating Republican Dave Wilfong and Libertarian Andrew Liuzzo.

In 2023, Sundquist was challenged by Jamestown City Councilwoman Kim Ecklund for mayor and was defeated.
