= Francis S. Edwards =

American politician

Francis Smith Edwards
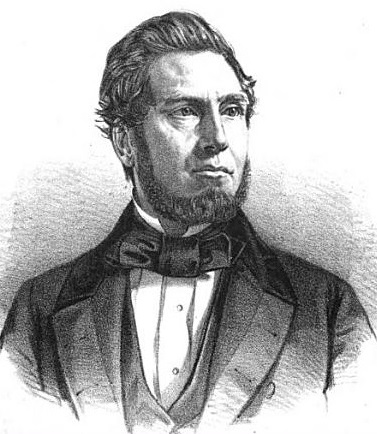

Member of the U.S. House of Representatives from New York's 33rd district
- In office March 4, 1855 – February 28, 1857
- Preceded by: Reuben E. Fenton
- Succeeded by: Reuben E. Fenton

Personal details
- Born: May 28, 1817 Windsor, New York, U.S.
- Died: May 20, 1899 (aged 81) Dunkirk, New York, U.S.

Francis Smith Edwards (May 28, 1817 – May 20, 1899) was a U.S. representative from New York.

Born in Windsor, New York, Edwards completed preparatory studies. He attended Hamilton (New York) College (now Colgate University), but did not graduate. He studied law. He was admitted to the bar in New York City May 20, 1840, and practiced in Sherburne and Albany. He moved to Fredonia in 1851 and continued the practice of law. He was appointed master and examiner in chancery for Chenango County in 1842. He was appointed special county surrogate of Chautauqua County in 1853, and served until November 1, 1855.

Edwards was elected as the candidate of the American Party to the Thirty-fourth Congress and served from March 4, 1855, to February 28, 1857, when he resigned. He was an unsuccessful candidate for reelection in 1856 to the Thirty-fifth Congress. He settled in Dunkirk, New York, in 1859, and resumed the practice of his profession. City attorney for nine years. He retired from the practice of law in 1892.

Edwards was elected police justice in 1895 and served until ten days before his death. He died in Dunkirk, New York, on May 20, 1899. He was interred in Forest Hill Cemetery, Fredonia, New York.

U.S. House of Representatives
Preceded by Reuben E. Fenton	Member of the U.S. House of Representatives from New York's 33rd congressional district March 4, 1855 – February 28, 1857	Succeeded by Reuben E. Fenton
