= Jamestown High School (New York) =

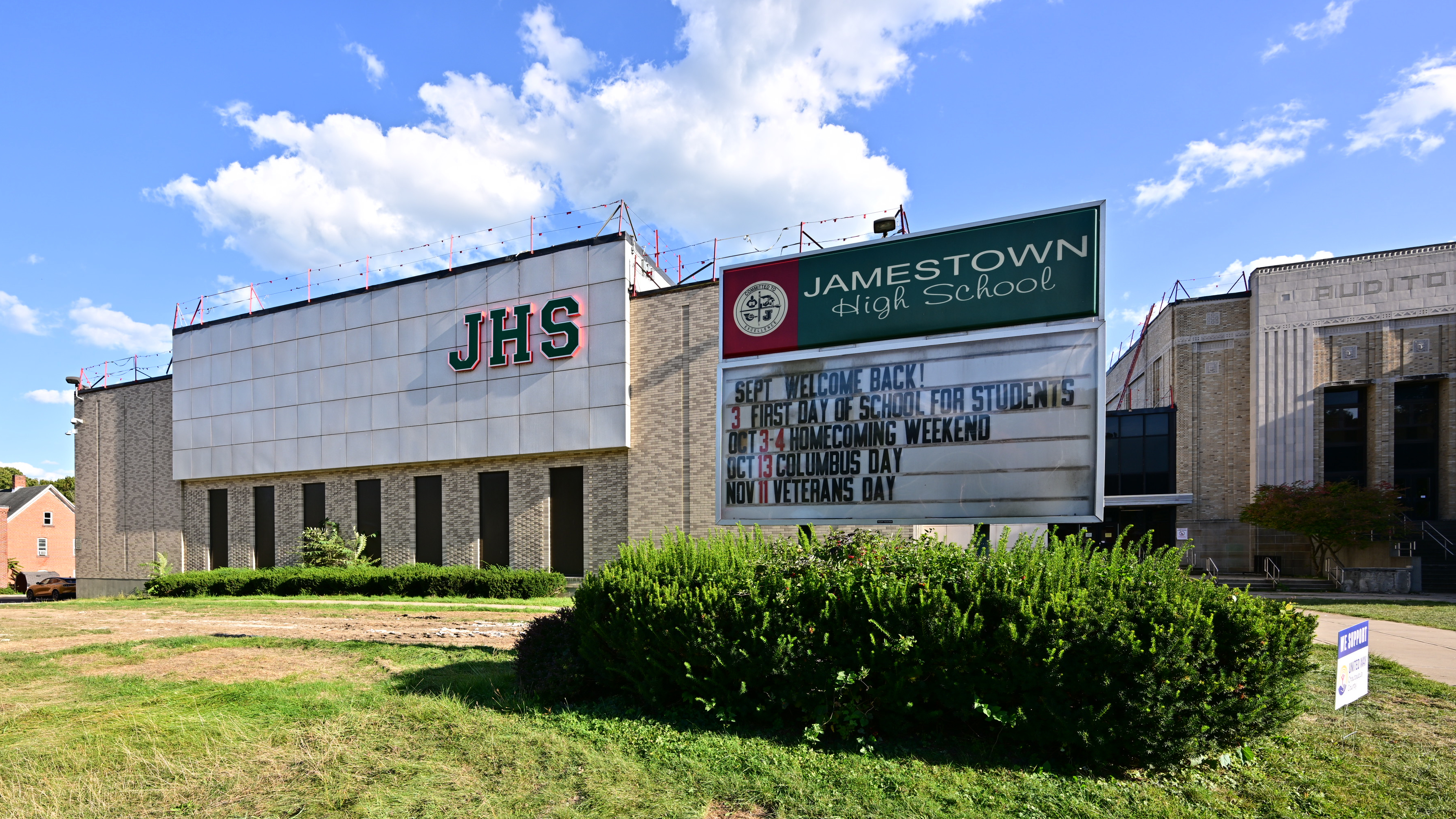

Location
- 350 East Second Street; Jamestown, New York 14701; 42.09623°N 79.23548°W

Information
- Type: Public
- Established: 1867
- School district: Jamestown City School District
- NCES School ID: 361563001350
- Principal: Allyson Smith
- Staff: 100.58 (on an FTE basis)
- Grades: 9–12
- Enrollment: 1,354 (2023–2024)
- Student to teacher ratio: 13.46
- Colors: Red and Green
- Team name: Red & Green
- Website: www.jpsny.org/JHS

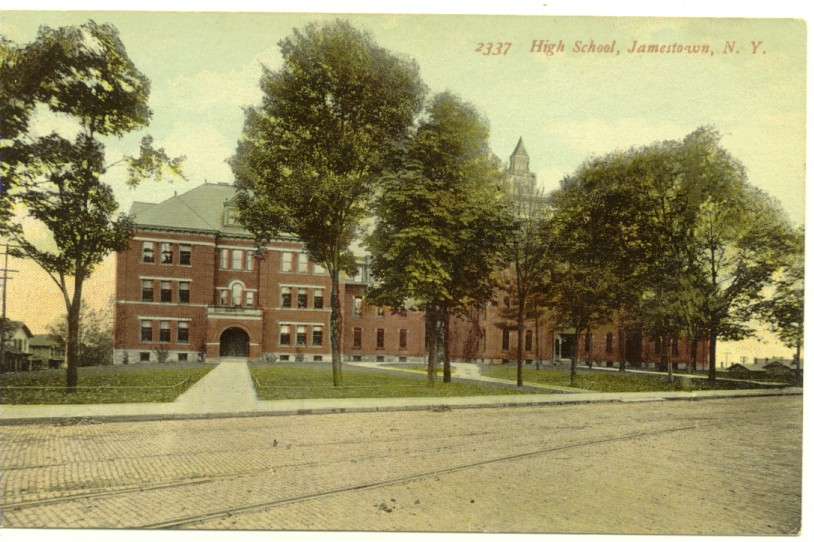
A postcard photograph of the school taken between 1906 and 1916

Jamestown High School (JHS) is a public high school located in Jamestown, New York. It is the sole public high school in Jamestown. It also serves some students in the surrounding towns of Ellicott, Kiantone, Busti, and Carroll.

The school educates high school freshmen, sophomores, juniors, and seniors. Jamestown High School is the sole high school within the Jamestown Public Schools district.

== History ==
=== 20th century ===
In 1903, Jamestown High School published the school's first yearbook.

In 1934, the present building that houses Jamestown High School began construction as part of President Franklin D. Roosevelt's New Deal. The Federal Public Works Administration Docket No. NY 2754 called for the construction of two school buildings in Jamestown, New York, and the new Jamestown High School and the Industrial Arts Building nearby were both constructed.

In 1935, a new Jamestown High School opened for classes. Financed in part by the Public Works Administration, it is an Art Deco school that occupies the site of the Jamestown Union School and Collegiate Institute on East Second Street. Plans for a new high school had been considered as early as 1920 but problems with cost and siting kept the project from proceeding. The architectural firm of Beck and Tinkham prepared the plans for the main building, and Oliver Johnson designed the industrial arts building, located at the southeast of the main building, in 1934. The general contract was given to the John W. Cowper Company of Buffalo, New York.

The high school received additions in 1967 and 1986. Art Deco elements used in the design of the building include low relief, geometrical motifs; parallel vertical lines; stepped pilasters; and grooved, block style, lettering.”

According to the Public Works Administration documents:

“These buildings replace the Collegiate Institute and Union School … the new buildings have 45% greater capacity than the old.”

“The auditorium, which is in the High School Building, seats 1600, is acoustically designed, and has a large fully equipped stage. It has a moving picture booth, radio amplifying system and theatre lighting. A large gymnasium is placed directly below the auditorium.”

“The buildings were substantially completed on March 31, 1937. The Public Works Administration assisted by a loan and a 30% grant. Total construction cost was $1,264,200 and the total project cost was $1,394,900.”

From 1984 to 1987, the school went through modernization, including the construction of a new gym.

=== 21st century ===
In 2003, a major capital project took place at Jamestown High School which included a renovation of the sidewalk at the school's entrance and redone classrooms at the 3rd floor.

On November 6, 2019, a 4-student fight caused Principal Rosemary Bradley to issue a school-wide lockdown. This led to the majority of the Board of Education voting on a lack of confidence in her.

In November 2023, a student fight In the cafeteria caused to say a hold in place.

On January 11, 2024, the Jamestown Red Raiders changed to the Jamestown Red & Green due to Red Raiders being a "Native American name".

On April 29th to October 9th 2025. the fire alarm went off multiple times caused by new cafeteria work, mostly during block 2 and block 4, which caused dthe fire trucks to stay busy in false alarm, even after the lockdown drill in block 2 on May 1st 2025. They fixed it on October 17, 2025.

On May 13, 2026 the new cafeteria opened for students and staff

== Academics ==
In addition to the standard courses of history, math, science, and English, Jamestown High School teaches courses covering many different areas of art and music. It also offers college-level courses via the Advanced Placement Program in a variety of subjects that allow students to receive university credit.

The Advanced Placement Program sometimes produces high pass rates on the Advanced Placement Exams. College classes are also taught at the school through Jamestown Community College's College Connections program. The College Connections program offers students at participating high schools in the surrounding area the opportunity to earn college credits by completing select courses offered by Jamestown Community College for free and without having to leave their school.

Students graduating in the top 20% of their graduating class get into Jamestown Community College for free.

== Sports ==
Jamestown High School offers softball, baseball, boys' tennis, boys' and girls' track and field, and golf in the spring; football, boys' and girls' soccer, boys' and girls' cross country, girls' tennis, girls' swimming, and girls' volleyball in the fall; and boys' and girls' basketball, boys' swimming, boys' and girls' indoor track, bowling, and wrestling in the winter. Hockey is not part of the school's varsity sports program but is run by the local youth hockey association in Jamestown.

The Red Raider high school football program found success in the mid-1990s. They played North Rockland in their first state championship game in 1993. While they were defeated in that game, the Red Raiders went on to win state titles in 1994 and 1995. Jamestown did not advance to a state title game again until 2000. In the fall of 2014, the Red Raider football team went to the NYSPHSAA Class AA Championship at the Carrier Dome in Syracuse, New York. The Raiders played Newburgh Free Academy and won the championship. It was their first since 2000.

In 2011, the Jamestown Red Raiders were runners-up for the state in basketball, eventually falling to state and national powerhouse Mount Vernon. In 2014, the basketball program advanced to the state championship final, falling to Green Tech High Charter School.

== Extracurricular activities ==
Clubs offered are Art Club, Astronomy Club, Broadcast Communications Club, Chess Club, Environmental Club, FBLA, Fellowship of Christian Athletes, French Club, French Club, Futuro Latino Club, Gardening Club, Gay/Straight Alliance, Key Club, Mock Trial, National Honor Society, Needlework Club, Raider Readers, School Newspaper, Ski Club, Spanish Club, and Yearbook Club.

=== Music ===
The study of music in the Jamestown Public Schools is as old as the school system itself. In the late 1800s, classroom teachers utilized piano, guitar and whatever materials were available to them to provide music instruction in addition to the three "R"s. Miss Ebba Goranson and her brother Arthur created our present day high school ensembles in 1924 with the establishment of the A Cappella Choir, Orchestra, and Band.

=== "Red Raider" Marching Band ===
The modern Jamestown High School band program began in 1924 under the direction of Arthur Goranson. Since then, the band has become a staple of Jamestown's history, and has had a tradition of excellence since its beginnings.

The state champion "Red Raider" Marching Band's appearances also include representing New York state at the Festival of States in St. Petersburg, Florida (1982 and 1988) and representing the state at the Macy's Thanksgiving Day Parade in Manhattan (1984, 1989 and 1995). The 1989 Macy's trip included two national television appearances on the David Letterman Show and a 1995 appearance on NBC's Today Show.

In 1986, the band performed on New Year's Day at the Tournament of Roses Parade in Pasadena, California. In 1988, the school's concert band appeared in concert at Carnegie Hall in 1998.

In 2000, the band was named Grand Champion International at the North American Music Festival Competition in Myrtle Beach, South Carolina. The band traveled to the FedEx Orange Bowl in Miami as New York state representatives in 2004, where they placed first in both categories, parade band and field competition, and won the right to perform at the Orange Bowl pre-game.

In December 2007, the band traveled to Orlando, Florida, where it and performed in the nationally televised Citrus Parade and Mickey's Once Upon a Christmas Time Parade at Magic Kingdom at Disney World. The marching band has participated in the St. Patrick's Day Parade in New York City[ (2010) and Chicago (2017). The band traveled to Disney World to participate in the Electric Light Parade in the Magic Kingdom in 2012 and 2014. In December 2019, the band traveled to Disney World to perform in the Magic Kingdom's New Year's Eve Parade.

Other directors of the band include: Delbert Vossberg (1948–1953); Charles Jacobson (1953–1968); Cecil Adams (1968–1969); Frank Smeragliuolo (1969–1970); Jeffrey Corbin (1970–1980); Lou Deppas (1980–2000); Gary Kurtis (2000–2001); Keith Hall (2000–2001); Cathy South (2001–2002); Cory Derrenbacher (2002–2005); Jeff Hoffman (2002–2003); Jamie Sigler (1998–2006); James Stephens (2005–2006); Marc Lentsch (2006–2010); and Meghan (Bolling) Murray (2006–present).

The Marching Band has earned five New York State Field Band Conference state championship titles, including in 1991 (Class AAA), 2002, 2014, 2015 and 2018 (Large School 2).

In 2014 the band placed first in the Large School 2 Division in Syracuse, New York with their show "Gold Rush ", and repeated this feat once again in 2015 with their show "Lasting Impressions ". This was the first time the band had won back-to-back state championship titles in its history.

In 2018, the band successfully completed their season with another win in the Large School 2 division with their show "Canon ". This is the fifth time the band has received a first place title at the New York State Field Band Conference Championships.

== Notable alumni ==
- Stephen Carlson, professional football player, Chicago Bears
- James Parker Hall, former dean, University of Chicago Law School
- Bryan Hodgson, basketball coach
- Robert H. Jackson, U.S. Supreme Court associate justice and Nuremberg Trials prosecutor
- Reginald Lenna, U.S. Army officer, businessman, and philanthropist
- Nate Milne, head football coach, Muhlenberg College
- Jaysean Paige, former NBA professional basketball player, Detroit Pistons
- Walter Washington, first mayor of Washington, D.C.
