= Samuel Teresi =

American politician

24th Mayor of Jamestown, New York
- In office January 1, 2000 – January 1, 2020
- Preceded by: Richard Kimball
- Succeeded by: Eddie Sundquist

Personal details
- Born: Jamestown, New York
- Party: Democratic

Samuel Teresi is an American politician. He was the 24th mayor of Jamestown, New York, from 2000 to 2020 after defeating incumbent Republican mayor Richard Kimball Jr. Teresi earned a BA in political science from State University of New York, Buffalo in 1982, and an MA in Public Affairs/Administration from State University of New York, Albany in 1984.

On February 4, 2019, he announced he would not seek re-election. He was succeeded by Eddie Sundquist.
