= Gov. Reuben Fenton Mansion =

Historic house in New York, United States

- U.S. National Register of Historic Places
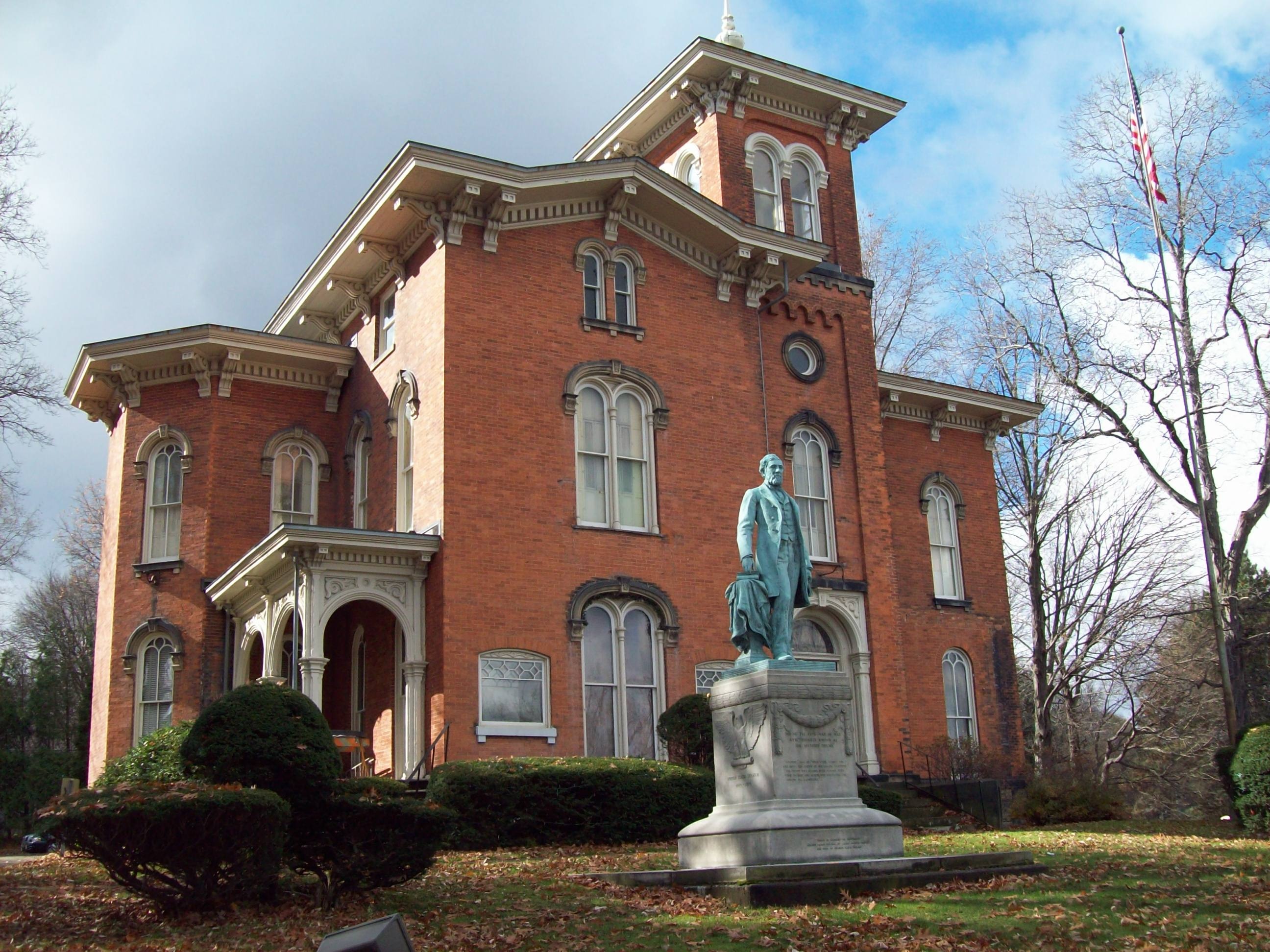
- Gov. Reuben Fenton Mansion, November 2010

- Location within New York Location within the United States
- Interactive map showing the location of Gov. Reuben Fenton Mansion
- Location: 68 S. Main St., Jamestown, New York
- Coordinates: 42°5′29″N 79°14′20″W
- Built: 1863
- Architectural style: Italian Villa
- NRHP reference No.: 72000824
- Added to NRHP: October 18, 1972

Gov. Reuben Fenton Mansion, also known as Walnut Grove, is a historic home located at Jamestown in Chautauqua County, New York, United States. It is an Italian Villa style residence built in 1863. The home features a four-story tower. It was the home of Reuben Fenton (1819–1885). In 1919, the city of Jamestown acquired the property as a Soldiers and Sailors Memorial. During World War II it was used as a recruitment center. After being abandoned for many decades the city had plans to tear it down, however, a society was formed to help save the building. It has been home to the Fenton History Center since 1964 and is now used as a museum dedicated to the local history of Chautauqua county.

It was listed on the National Register of Historic Places in 1972.

It became a Blue Star museum in 2022.

== History ==
=== Residence ===
The Fenton mansion was built 1863 for Reuben Fenton and his family. It was occupied until his wife Elizabeth Scudder Fenton's death in 1901.

=== War memorial ===
The property was vacant for many years before the city bought the house in 1919 for $35,000 to use as a war memorial for soldiers and sailors. Veterans associations began to occupy the building. During World War II, the building was used as a recruitment center for young soldiers. It was known as the "last chapter of the Grand Army of the Republic". The mansion was also home to a local chapter of the Grand Army of the Republic as well as the national headquarters until the last Civil War veteran died in 1956.

=== Historical society ===
In the early 1960s, the building was abandoned. There were plans to tear down the house in conjunction with the new route route 60 was going to take through Jamestown. While plans were being made to tear down the building, mayor William D. Whitehead appointed Stanley A. Weeks to look into other possible uses for the mansion. Weeks would later become the first life member.

In 1962, the mayor of Jamestown formed a committee to determine what to do with the property and it was decided to establish a historical society and museum, with the goal of preserving and restoring the Fenton Mansion.

The Fenton Historical Society was established on May 22, 1963 and the mansion was converted into a museum. Mary Torrance was the original president, Harry Rose was the first vice president, William Reynolds was the second vice president, Sybill McFadden was the secretary and Bert Hough was the treasurer. In 2013, the adjacent William Hall House was purchased to use as for archives and a research library.

== Archaeology ==
The grounds around the Fenton, also known as Walnut Grove Park, have been the location of a historical archaeology site. The dig started in 2012 and has the goal of uncovering many of the original historical structures that surrounded the Fenton mansion.

Some of these structures included the barn, carriage house, and servants' quarters. It was discovered that the barn was actually torn down and a greenhouse was built on the same location.

The dig is ongoing, and is coordinated by Dr. Thomas Greer.
