= Augustus P. Hascall =

American politician

Augustus P. Has all

Member of the U.S. House of Representatives from New York's 33rd district
- In office March 4, 1851 – March 3, 1853
- Preceded by: Harvey Putnam
- Succeeded by: Reuben E. Fenton

Personal details
- Born: Augustus Porter Hascall; June 24, 1800 Hinsdale, Massachusetts, U.S.
- Died: June 27, 1872 (aged 72) Le Roy, New York, U.S.
- Resting place: Myrtle Street Cemetery; Le Roy, New York
- Party: Whig
- Spouse(s): Mary Elizabeth Hinsdale Hascall; Malvina H. Simons Hascall
- Children: Lucien A. Hascall; Hiram A Hascall; Porter Hascall; Herman Elizur Hascall; Col. Herbert Austin Hascall; Augustus Porter Hascall; Charles Morris Hascall; Francis Marion Hascall; Theodore Frelinghuysen Hascall; Melvin Conklin Hascall
- Profession: Surveyor; Lawyer; Judge; Politician

Augustus Porter Hascall (June 24, 1800 – June 27, 1872) was an American politician, surveyor, lawyer, judge, and a one-term U.S. representative from New York from 1851 to 1853.

== Early life ==
Born in Hinsdale, Massachusetts, Hascall moved to Le Roy, New York, in 1815 and attended public and private schools. He engaged in surveying and studied law. He was admitted to the bar on March 10, 1852, and commenced practice in Le Roy, New York.

== Career ==
A Justice of the Peace and Town Supervisor, Hascall also served as Judge of the Court of Common Pleas and for more than thirty years was a member of the board of trustees of the Le Roy Female Seminary and Ingham University.

Elected as a Whig to the Thirty-second Congress, Hascall served as United States Representative for the 33rd district of New York from March 4, 1851, to March 3, 1853. After his term, he resumed the practice of law. He was trustee of the village of Le Roy in 1858.

== Death ==
Hascall died in Le Roy, New York, on June 27, 1872 (age 72 years, 3 days). He is interred at Myrtle Street Cemetery, Le Roy, New York.

== Family life ==
On June 25, 1827, Hascall married Mary Elizabeth Hinsdale who died on March 15, 1842, and they had seven children. His second marriage was to Malvina H. Simmons on April 23, 1844. They had three children.

U.S. House of Representatives
| Preceded by Harvey Putnam | Member of the U.S. House of Representatives from New York's 33rd congressional district 1851–1853 | Succeeded by Reuben E. Fenton |
