= Reuben Fenton =

American politician and governor (1819–1885)

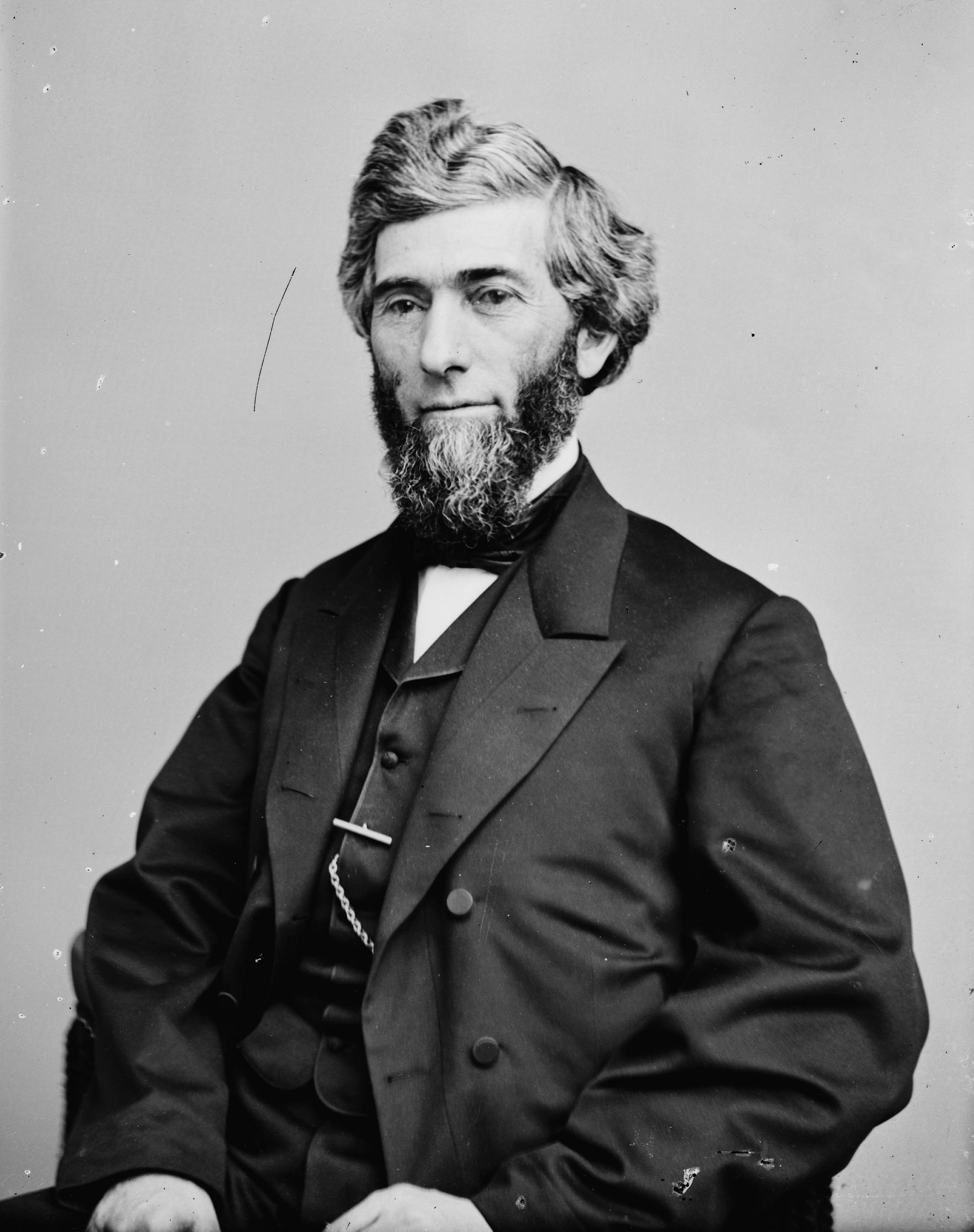
- Fenton, c. 1860–1865

22nd Governor of New York
- In office January 1, 1865 – December 31, 1868
- Lieutenant: Thomas G. Alvord; Stewart Woodford
- Preceded by: Horatio Seymour
- Succeeded by: John T. Hoffman

United States Senator from New York
- In office March 4, 1869 – March 3, 1875
- Preceded by: Edwin D. Morgan
- Succeeded by: Francis Kernan

Member of the U.S. House of Representatives from New York
- In office March 4, 1857 – December 20, 1864
- Preceded by: Francis S. Edwards
- Succeeded by: Henry Van Aernam
- Constituency: 33rd district (1857–63); 31st district (1863–64)
- In office March 4, 1853 – March 3, 1855
- Preceded by: Augustus P. Hascall
- Succeeded by: Francis S. Edwards
- Constituency: 33rd district

Personal details
- Born: Reuben Eaton Fenton; July 4, 1819 Carroll, New York, U.S.
- Died: August 25, 1885 (aged 66) Jamestown, New York, U.S.
- Resting place: Lake View Cemetery
- Party: Democratic (before 1857); Republican (1857–72, 1873–85); Liberal Republican (1872–73)
- Spouses: Jane Frew (m. 1840; died 1842) Elizabeth Scudder (m. 1844)
- Children: 4
- Education: Cary's Academy; Fredonia Academy
- Occupation: Attorney businessman

Reuben Eaton Fenton (July 4, 1819 – August 25, 1885) was an American merchant and politician from New York. In the mid-19th century, he served as a U.S. representative, a U.S. senator, and as the 22nd governor of New York.

== Early life ==
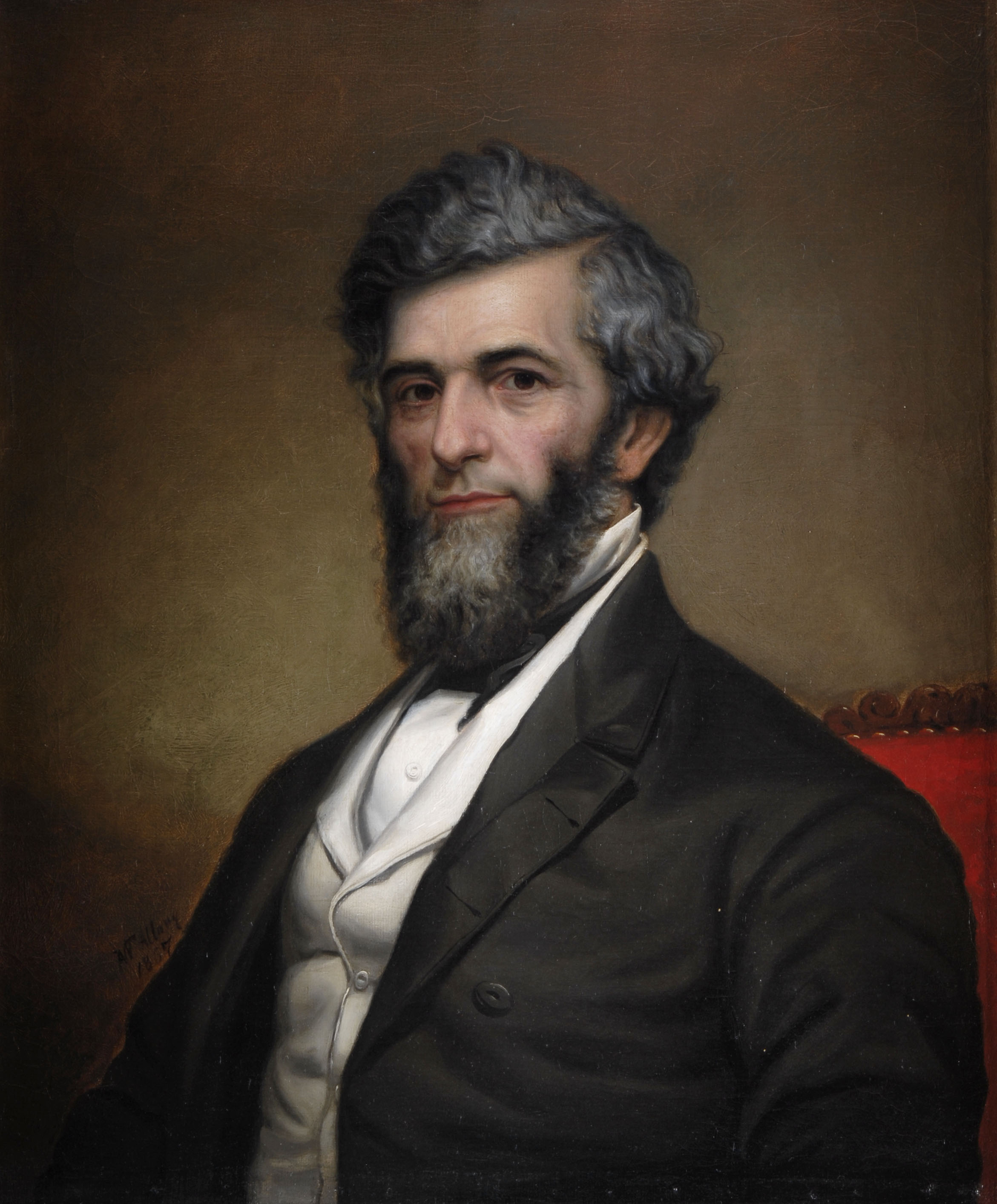
Gubernatorial portrait of New York Governor Reuben E. Fenton.

Fenton was born near Frewsburg, in Chautauqua County, New York, on July 4, 1819. He was the son of a farmer, and schoolteacher, George Washington Fenton (1783–1860) and Elsey (née Owen) Fenton (1790–1875). His maternal grandfather was John Owen, a veteran of the French & Indian War. He had four siblings: Roswell Owen Fenton, George Washington Fenton Jr., William H.H. Fenton, and John Freeman Fenton.

His paternal grandparents were Roswell Fenton and Deborah (née Freeman) Fenton and his maternal grandfather was John Owen of Carroll, New York. His paternal aunt, Hannah Fenton was the wife of Lambert Van Buren of Kinderhook, New York.

He was educated in the district school, Cary's Academy near Cincinnati, Ohio, and the Fredonia Academy.

== Career ==
In 1840, he was named commander of the New York Militia's 162nd Infantry Regiment with the rank of colonel. He became a lumber merchant, studied law, and was admitted to the bar in 1841. Fenton entered politics as a Democrat. He was Town Supervisor of Carroll from 1843 to 1850.

=== U.S. House of Representatives ===
He was elected as a Democrat to the 33rd United States Congress, and served from March 4, 1853, to March 3, 1855. In his first term in Congress, Fenton strongly opposed the Kansas-Nebraska Act of 1854 and unsuccessfully tried to persuade President Franklin Pierce and U.S. Secretary of State William L. Marcy to oppose the bill. He was defeated for re-election that year. He left the Democratic Party to help organize the Republican Party, and was later elected, as a Republican, to the 35th, 36th, 37th and 38th United States Congresses, and served from 1857 to 1865. During the 36th Congress, he served on the Committee on Invalid Pensions and in the 37th Congress, he served on the Committee on Claims. He served a total of five terms as congressman.

=== Governor of New York ===
He was the Governor of New York from 1865 to 1868, elected in 1864 and 1866. "During his tenure, Cornell University was founded; a free public school system was initiated; and relief measures were sanctioned that benefited veterans." After serving two terms as governor, Fenton lost the November 1868 election to John T. Hoffman, a Tammany-backed Democrat. In 1868, he was among the candidates to be Vice President but the nomination went eventually to Schuyler Colfax, whom Fenton had previously been allied with in discussing "growing public agitation about" General George B. McClellan's inactivity with President Abraham Lincoln during the U.S. Civil War.

=== U.S. Senator ===
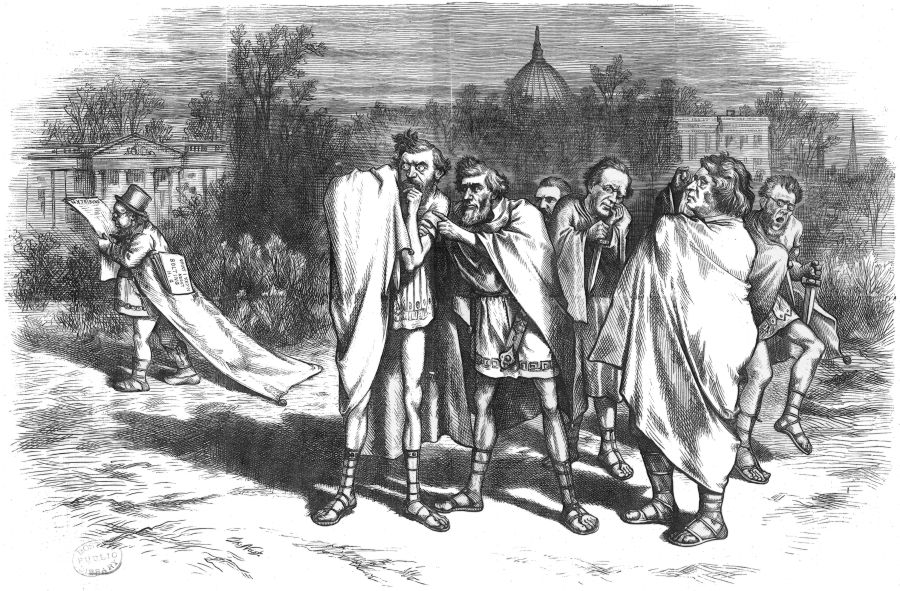
Fenton (center) is among the conspiratorial Liberal Republicans in this Harper's Weekly cartoon of March 16, 1872.

In January 1869, he was elected a U.S. Senator from New York, succeeding Edwin D. Morgan and serving from 1869 to 1875 when Francis Kernan replaced him. While in the Senate, he served as Chair of the Committee to Audit and Control the Contingent Expenses during the 42nd Congress while also serving on the Committee on Manufactures and the Committee on Territories.

In July 1870, President Grant appointed Thomas Murphy to be the New York Customs House Collector, a position rich with patronage. Fenton opposed the nomination, but was unsuccessful when Sen. Roscoe Conkling gave a speech in which he produced proof that Fenton had stolen $12,000 as a young man rather than deliver it as a currier. Fenton had claimed he was robbed. Fenton, upon seeing the documents that had been produced by Conkling, slumped over his desk in defeat according to author Ron Chernow. The actions of Conkling secured his place as the leader of the Republican machine in New York and greatly reduced the clout of Fenton.

In 1872, he was among the Republicans opposed to President Ulysses S. Grant who joined the short-lived Liberal Republican Party.

=== Later life ===
In 1878, Fenton represented the United States at the International Monetary Conference in Paris. He was known as "The Soldiers' Friend" for his efforts to help returning Civil War veterans. He worked to remove tuition charges for public education, helped to establish six schools for training teachers, and signed the charter for Cornell University.

== Personal life ==
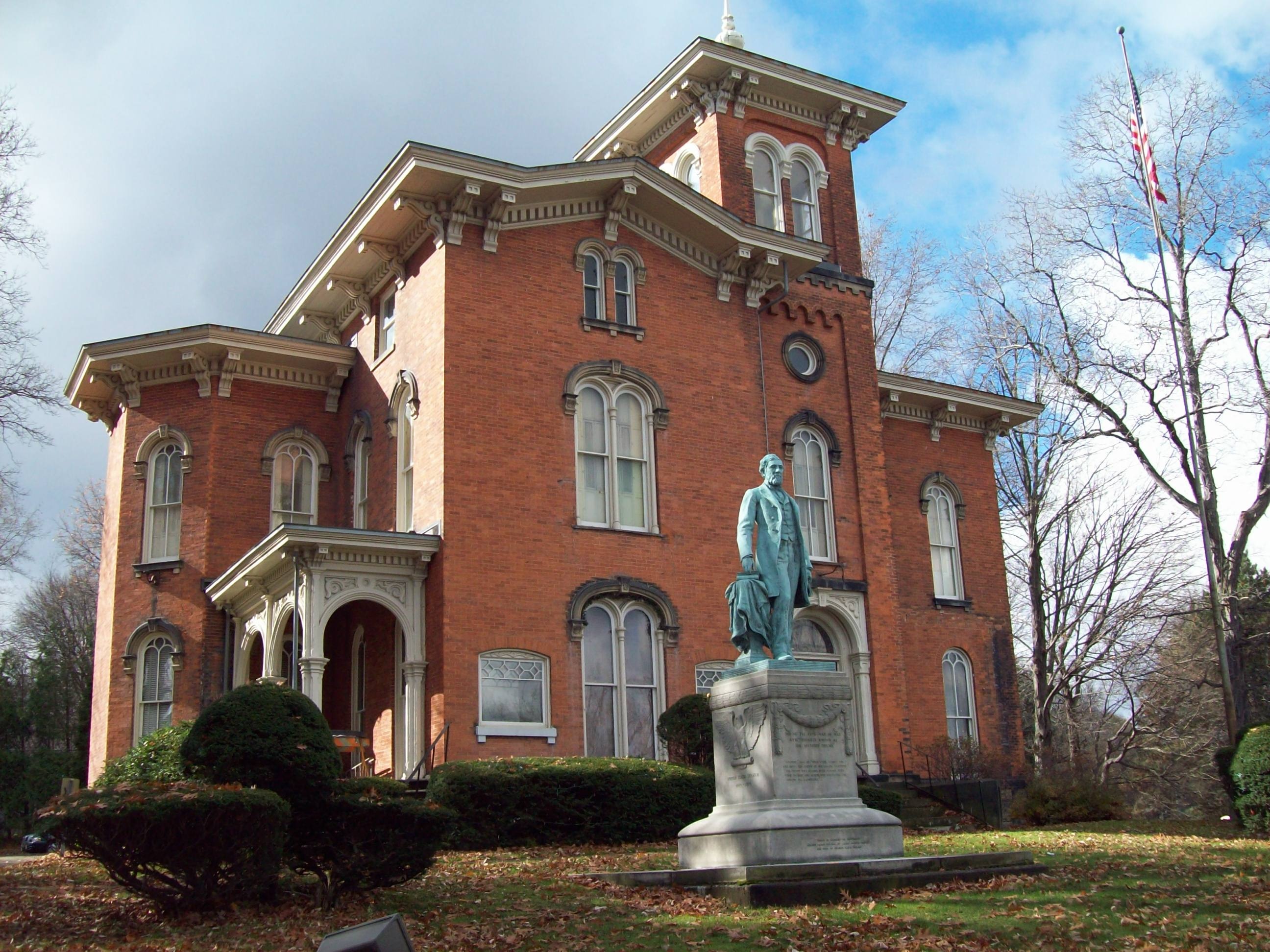
Fenton's home in Jamestown.

In 1840, Fenton was married to Jane W. Frew (1821–1842), the daughter of John and Isabelle (Armstrong) Frew. They had one daughter, Jane Frew Fenton. After his first wife's death in 1842 Jane went to live with her maternal grandparents. Reuben got remarried on June 12, 1844, to Elizabeth Scudder (1824–1901). Together, they were the parents of:

- Josephine Fenton (1845–1928), who married Frank Edward Gifford (1845–1934).
- Jeannette Fenton (1849–1924), who married Albert Gilbert (1851–1912).
- Reuben Earle Fenton (1865–1895), who married Lillian Mai Hayden, daughter of Charles H. Hayden in 1890.

=== Death and burial ===
Fenton died on August 25, 1885, in Jamestown, and was buried in Lake View Cemetery.

== Legacy ==
The town of Fenton in Broome County, New York, is named After Reuben Fenton.

Fenton's family home was an Italian Villa style house built in 1863. He and his family lived there until Fenton's wife died. After her death the house was abandoned before it became city property in 1919. It has been home to the Fenton History Center since 1964 and is now used as a museum dedicated to the local history of Chautauqua county. It was listed on the National Register of Historic Places in 1972.

After his death, a building at The State University of New York at Fredonia, Fenton Hall, was named in his honor because he had attended the previous incarnation of the school, Fredonia Academy.

Fenton Avenue in The Bronx, New York, is named for him.

== See also ==
- List of American politicians who switched parties in office

Party political offices
| Preceded by James S. Wadsworth | Republican nominee for Governor of New York; 1864, 1866 | Succeeded by John Augustus Griswold |
U.S. House of Representatives
| Preceded by Augustus P. Hascall | Member of the U.S. House of Representatives from New York's 33rd congressional district March 4, 1853 – March 3, 1855 | Succeeded by Francis S. Edwards |
| Preceded by Francis S. Edwards | Member of the U.S. House of Representatives from New York's 33rd congressional district March 4, 1857 – March 3, 1863 | District eliminated |
| Preceded by Burt Van Horn | Member of the U.S. House of Representatives from New York's 31st congressional district March 4, 1863 – December 20, 1864 | Succeeded by Henry Van Aernam |
Political offices
| Preceded by Horatio Seymour | Governor of New York; 1865–1868 | Succeeded by John T. Hoffman |
U.S. Senate
| Preceded by Edwin D. Morgan | U.S. senator (Class 1) from New York; 1869–1875; Served alongside: Roscoe Conkling | Succeeded by Francis Kernan |
