= James Prendergast (pioneer) =

American pioneer and politician

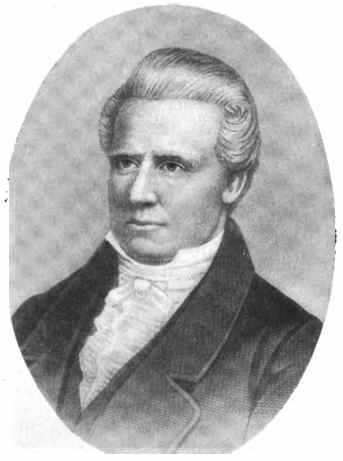

Town of Elicott Supervisor
- In office 1813–1815
- Preceded by: Position Established
- Succeeded by: John Frew

Personal details
- Born: March 9, 1764 Pawling, New York
- Died: November 15, 1846 (aged 82) Kiantone, New York
- Resting place: Prendergast Cemetery

James Prendergast (March 9, 1764—November 15, 1846) was an American pioneer and politician, an early settler of Chautauqua County, New York, and the first founder and namesake of the city of Jamestown, New York.

== Biography ==
=== Early life ===
Prendergast was born on March 9, 1764, in Pawling, New York, a son of William Prendergast, Sr. (1727—1811) and Mehetabel Wing (1738—1812). Among his siblings included Jediah and John, both New York State Senators. After the American Revolution, the Prendergast family, consisting of the children, grandchildren, and servants, traveled to Wheeling, Virginia and then to Louisville, Kentucky, before they arrived in Memphis, Tennessee. Unsatisfied, the family moved to Upper Canada in what is now Ontario.

=== Pioneer ===
James Prendergast settled in the area that became Jamestown, New York. He discovered the area when searching for runaway horses. He returned to Pittstown where he married Agnes Thompson in 1807. She was born on September 18, 1771, in Galloway, Scotland. He brought his family, along with John and Mary Bowers, to Chautauqua County in 1810, and stayed with his brother Matthew during the winter of 1810–1811. Bowers built a log home near the future city and James built a log house nearby in the spring of 1811, along with a dam and sawmill. The house and mill were destroyed by fire in 1812, and he went on to build a new home.

=== Politics ===
In 1812, the Town of Elicott was formed from the Town of Pomfret and Prendergast was elected the first Supervisor of the Town of Ellicott and served from 1813 to 1815. He also served as Inspector of Schools in 1814, along with Solomon Jones and Theron Plumb. In 1814, he became an associate judge of the Court of Common Pleas. In 1815, Prendergast was nominated for New York State Assembly as a member of the Federalist Party, along with Daniel Chapin of Buffalo. They were defeated by the Republicans, Daniel McCleary and Elias Osborn. On December 13, 1816, the Jamestown Post-Office was established and Prendergast served as first postmaster. He served until October 24, 1824, when Laban Hazeltine (a brother of Abner Hazeltine) became postmaster.

=== Later life ===
In 1836, he sold his land in Jamestown and moved to Ripley, in the northern part of the county. His wife Agnes died at Ripley on January 9, 1839, at the age of 68. James Prendergast died at his home in Kiantone on November 15, 1846, at the age of 82. He was buried in Prendergast Cemetery. Prendergast had one son, Alexander, and a grandson named James, who is the namesake of James Prendergast Library in Jamestown, New York.

== Electoral history ==
1815 New York State Assembly election, Cattaraugus, Chautauque, and Niagara Counties
Party	Candidate	Votes	%
Democratic-Republican	Elias Osborn	989	
Democratic-Republican	Daniel MacCleary	989	
Federalist	James Prendergast	601	
Federalist	Daniel Chapin	564	
