= Harriet L. Leete =

American Red Cross nurse (1871–1927)

- Leete, from a 1922 publication
- Born: December 14, 1871; Jamestown, New York, U.S.
- Died: November 19, 1927 (aged 55); Long Island, New York, U.S.
- Occupation: Nurse

Harriet L. Leete (December 14, 1871 – November 19, 1927) was an American Red Cross nurse during World War I.

== Early life ==
Leete was born in Jamestown, New York, the daughter of Franklin Leet and Louise Jones Leet. Her father (who spelled his name without a final E) was a farmer and a justice of the peace.

== Career ==
Before World War I, Leete was superintendent of nurses at the Babies' Dispensary and Hospital in Cleveland, Ohio, and a nationally recognized expert on infant care.

Leete was a charter member of the National Committee on Red Cross Nursing Service. In 1917, she was in the first hospital unit to sail from the United States for France, as a member of the Lakeside Base Hospital Unit of Cleveland. In Paris she worked with the Red Cross Children's Bureau. She was chief nurse at the American Red Cross Hospital Number 5, at Auteuil. She went to work for the Balkan Commission, as Chief Nurse for northern Serbia, based at Belgrade Hospital. She contracted typhus at Palanka and returned to the United States in July 1919. The Serbian government awarded Leete the Order of St. Sava for her wartime efforts.

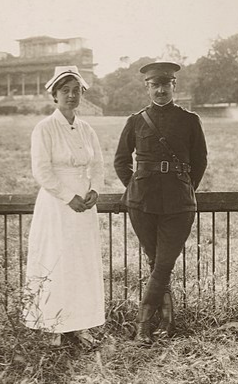
Harriet L. Leete and Major George de Tarnowsky, photographed at Auteuil in 1918, War Department. Title: 111-SC-14917, National Archives and Records Administration.

After the war, she was field director of the American Child Hygiene Association, which involved extensive travel and lecturing. "This twentieth century does belong to the child," she wrote, "and unless we as nurses — not just public health nurses, but all nurses — meet this challenge... we shall be liable to the reproach of those who follow us." From 1925 until her death, she was superintendent at a convalescent home in Far Rockaway, New York.

== Personal life ==
Leete died in 1927, aged 56 years, at a hospital on Long Island, from complications after an ear infection.
