= Samuel A. Carlson =

American politician (1868–1961)

6th Mayor of Jamestown, New York
- In office 1908–1928
- Preceded by: James L. Weeks
- Succeeded by: Lars Larson

8th Mayor of Jamestown, New York
- In office 1930–1934
- Preceded by: Lars Larson
- Succeeded by: Leon F. Roberts

Personal details
- Born: 1868
- Died: 1961
- Political party: Republican

Samuel A. Carlson (1868–1961) was mayor of his native city, Jamestown, New York, US. During his administration the Jamestown Board of Public Utilities (BPU) was organized. Carlson, a Republican, was the sixth (1908–1928) and the eighth Mayor (1930–1934) of the town. Jamestown dedicated a historical marker to him on the grounds of Jamestown City Hall. The BPU named the Samuel A. Carlson Electric Generating Station, a municipal coal-fired power plant in Jamestown, after him. As of 2025 no mayor of Jamestown had served as long as Carlson's 24 years.

In addition to his connection to the BPU, Carlson was an initiator and supporter of Jamestown's public hospital, public market, parks, roads and bridges, non-partisan elections, and new city charter. He also drilled the first water well to create the city's public water system. He was twice president of the New York State Conference of Mayors.

Carlson died in 1961 and was buried in Lake View Cemetery in Jamestown.
