= Jamestown Public Schools (New York) =

School district in New York, United States

Jamestown Public Schools (JPS), also known as the Jamestown City School District, is a school district headquartered in Jamestown, New York.

As of 2020 it has about 5,100 students.

== History ==
Dr. Bret Apthorpe serves as the superintendent. In February 2020 he announced that he would retire at the end of the school year, so the district board of education began a superintendent search. At the same time four school principals announced that they too were retiring.

== Schools ==
High school

- Jamestown High School

Middle schools

- Jefferson Middle School
- Persell Middle School
- Washington Middle School

Elementary schools

- Bush Elementary School
- Fletcher Elementary School
- Lincoln Elementary School
- Love Elementary School
- Ring Elementary School

Other

- Tech Academy
