= Jamestown, New York =

City in New York, United States

- City
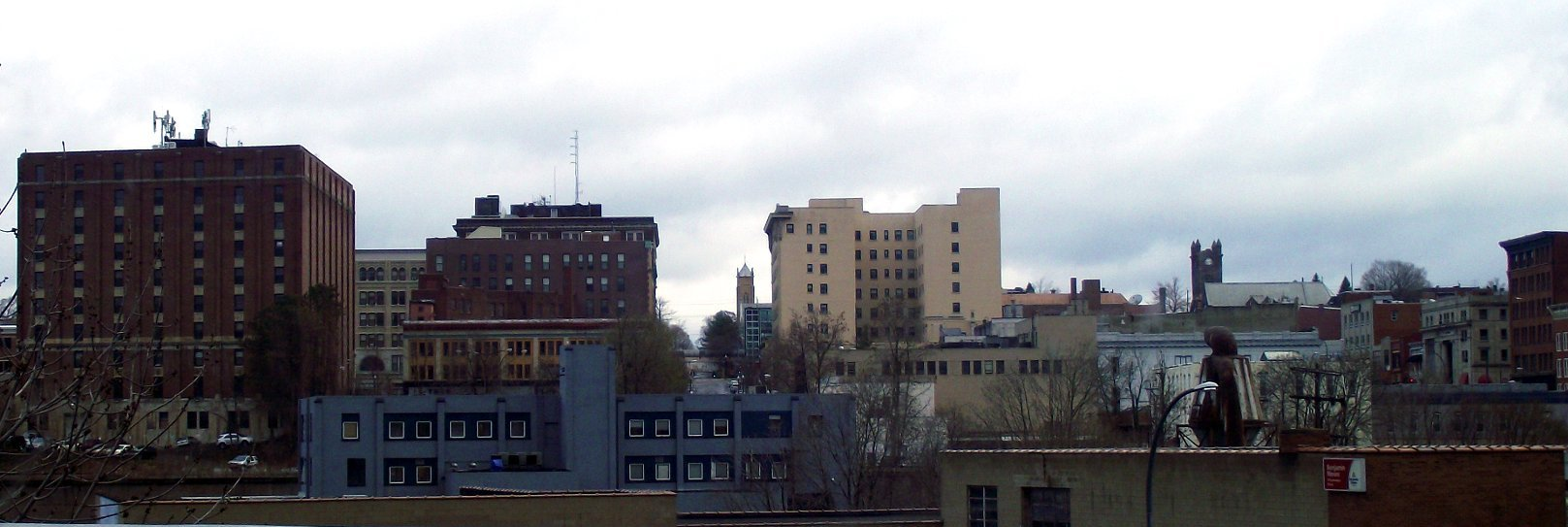
- Downtown Jamestown, viewed from Washington Street
- Nickname: The Pearl City
- Location within New York Location within the United States
- Coordinates: 42°5′44″N 79°14′19″W
- Country: United States
- State: New York
- County: Chautauqua
- Founded: 1810; 216 years ago
- Incorporated (village): 1827; 199 years ago
- Incorporated (city): April 19, 1886; 140 years ago

Government
  - Type: Mayor-Council
  - Mayor: Kim Ecklund (R)
  - Common Council: Members' List: At-Large Members: •; • Jeff Russell (R); • Randall Daversa (R); • W1: Brent Sheldon (R); • W2: Anthony J. Dolce (pres.) (R); • W3: Regina L. Brackman (D); • W4: Marie Carrubba (D); • W5: Vacant; • W6: Andrew G. Faulkner (R)

Area
  - Total: 9.05 sq mi (23.45 km^{2})
  - Land: 8.90 sq mi (23.05 km^{2})
  - Water: 0.15 sq mi (0.40 km^{2})
- Elevation: 1,380 ft (420 m)

Population (2020)
  - Total: 28,712
  - Density: 3,226.2/sq mi (1,245.66/km^{2})
- Time zone: UTC−5 (EST)
  - Summer (DST): UTC−4 (EDT)
- ZIP Codes: 14701; 14702 (PO box)
- Area code: 716
- FIPS code: 36-38264
- GNIS feature ID: 0953925
- Website: www.jamestownny.gov

Jamestown is a city in southern Chautauqua County, New York, United States. The population was 28,712 at the 2020 census. Situated between Lake Erie to the north and the Allegheny National Forest to the south, Jamestown is the largest city in the county. Nearby Chautauqua Lake is a freshwater resource used by fishermen, boaters, and naturalists.

In the 20th century, Jamestown was a thriving industrial area, noted for producing several well-known products. They include the crescent wrench, produced by Karl Peterson's the Crescent Tool Company in Jamestown beginning in 1907; and the automatic lever voting machine, manufactured by the Automatic Voting Machine Company, which dominated the lever voting machine industry from its location on Jones and Gifford Avenue in Jamestown until its bankruptcy in 1983. Jamestown was also once called the "Furniture Capital of the World" because of the once-thriving furniture industry. People visited from all over the country to attend furniture expositions at the Furniture Mart, a building that still stands in the city and houses offices for a variety of companies. For most of the 20th century, Blackstone Corporation, led by Reginald Lenna, was Jamestown's largest employer and one of the driving cores of the local economy, manufacturing washing machines and automobile components.

Notable people from Jamestown include legendary comedienne Lucille Ball, U.S. Supreme Court justice and Nuremberg chief prosecutor Robert H. Jackson, musician Natalie Merchant, musician Dennis Drew, musician John Lombardo, naturalist Roger Tory Peterson, NFL head coach Nick Sirianni, and NFL Commissioner Roger Goodell.

== History ==
=== 19th century ===
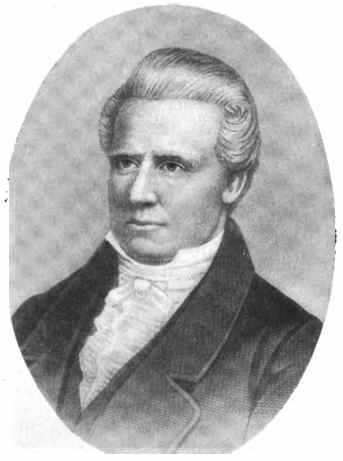
James Prendergast, founder of Jamestown

Jamestown is named after James Prendergast, an early Chautauqua County settler. His family purchased 3,500 acres (14 km^{2}) in 1806 in the area now known as Chautauqua County. James Prendergast explored the area that is now Jamestown. and saw the area to be valuable, and so he purchased an additional 1,000 acres (4.0 km^{2}) of land in the area in 1808. In the fall of 1809, Prendergast and an employee, John Blowers, built a log cabin, which became the first building in Jamestown. Another log cabin, as well as mills and a dam, were built on the Chadakoin River later on. In 1855, a night watch was created for the purpose of looking out for fires.

Jamestown was incorporated into a village in 1827 and incorporated into a city on April 19, 1886. Oscar F. Price was elected as the first mayor of the city on April 13, 1886. James Murray was appointed the first Chief of Police and would lead a force of six police officers.

In 1887, Jamestown Electric Light and Power Company, Art Metal, and WCA Hospital were established. In 1888, Jamestown Woolen Spinning Co. was established and the cornerstone of Holy Trinity Lutheran Church laid. In 1889, the American Aristotype Co. was established. The first electric trolley car in Jamestown made its appearance in 1890. In 1891, a fire destroyed the Old Homestead Hotel at Third and Pine Streets and four people died, but the James Prendergast Library and the Municipal Light Plant were established the same year.

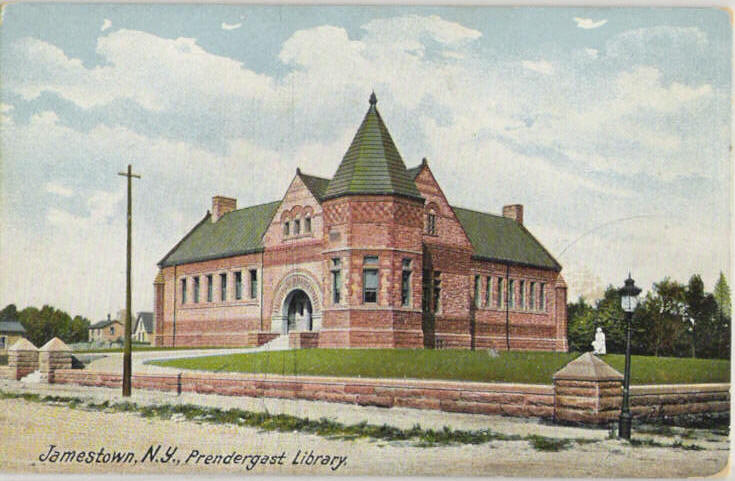
Prendergast Library, postcard c. 1901–1907

In 1892, Chautauqua Worsted mills was founded. In 1893, Jamestown Veneer Works was started by Nathan Wilson, and Jamestown's first ice cream company started making Collins Ice Cream. In 1895, the cornerstone of City Hall was laid and the city council decided to lay no more wooden sidewalks. Eleazer Green was elected mayor the same year. In 1896, Empire Worsted Mills was formed; in 1898, Chautauqua Towel Mills was opened; and in 1899, Henry H. Cooper was elected mayor.

=== 20th century ===
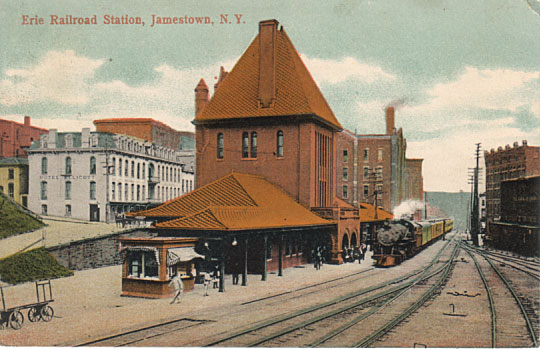
Erie Railroad Station, 1909 postcard

In 1900, Tinkham Brothers established their business, the Furniture Index was published, and the Hall Textile Corporation was formed. Also in 1900, Josephine Fenton Gifford, daughter of New York Governor Reuben Fenton, formed Crèche, a women's organization that continues to serve children in the community. In 1903, Jamestown purchased a water system and the J.P. Danielson Tool Co. was organized. In 1906, James L. Weeks was elected mayor. In 1907, the Crescent Tool Company was started by Karl Peterson and Charles F. Falldine. In 1908, Samuel A. Carlson was elected mayor. Music Study Club and Jamestown Symphony Orchestra began the same year.

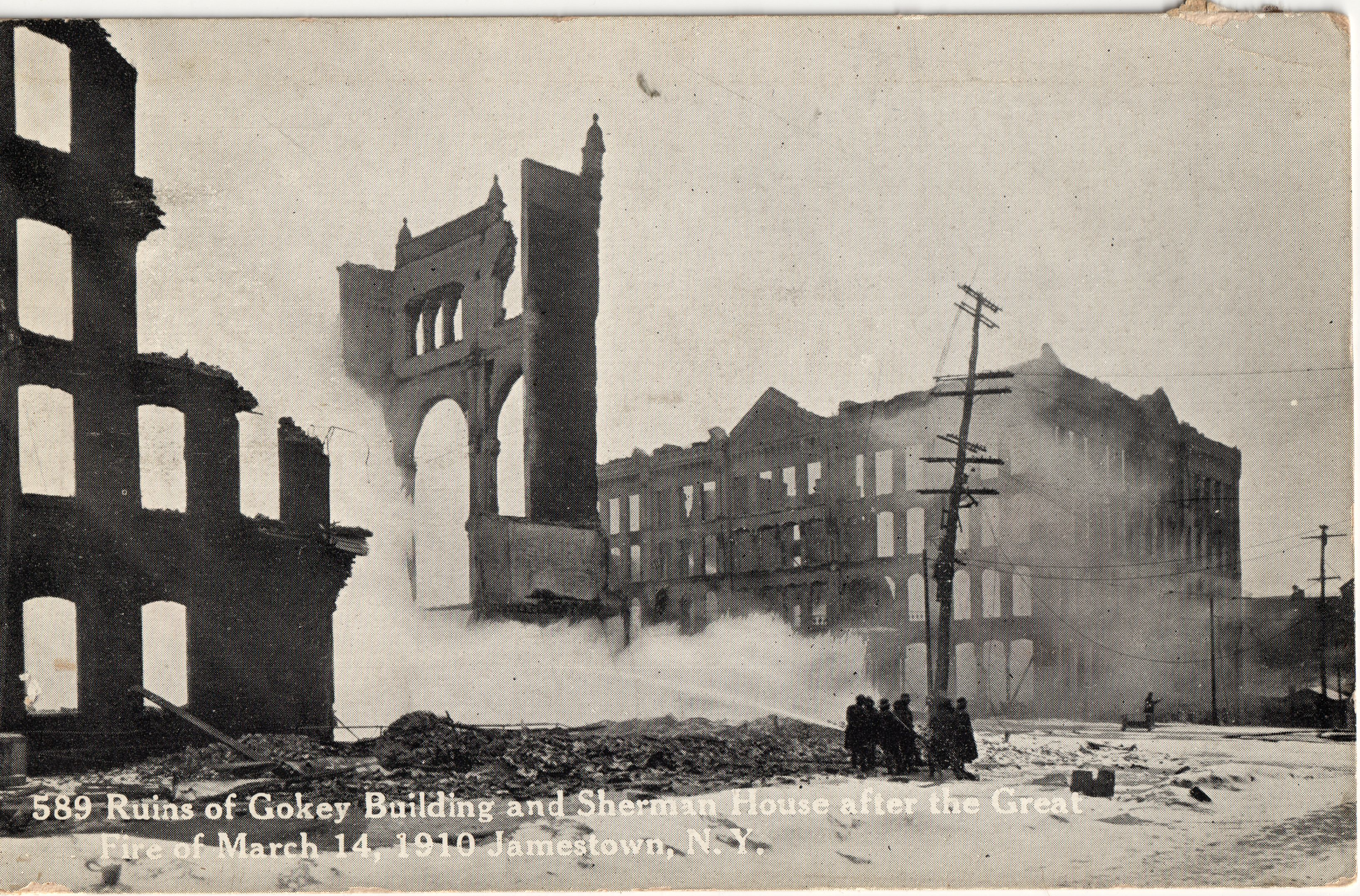
Ruins of Gokey Building and Sherman house after the great fire of March 14, 1910, Jamestown, NY

In 1910, the excavation began for the construction of Jamestown General Hospital, which still stands in the present day. In 1911, the Norden Club was started. On August 6, actress Lucille Ball was born in Jamestown. The first plane ever to fly over Jamestown did so on September 28, 1911. The Norden Clubhouse was completed in 1914. On April 8, 1917, Company E left for guard duty. The Emerson Glass Company started the same year. In 1918, Jamestown Corp. formed to make airplane propellers. A steamship, the City of Pittsburgh sank at the Boatlanding, also in 1918.

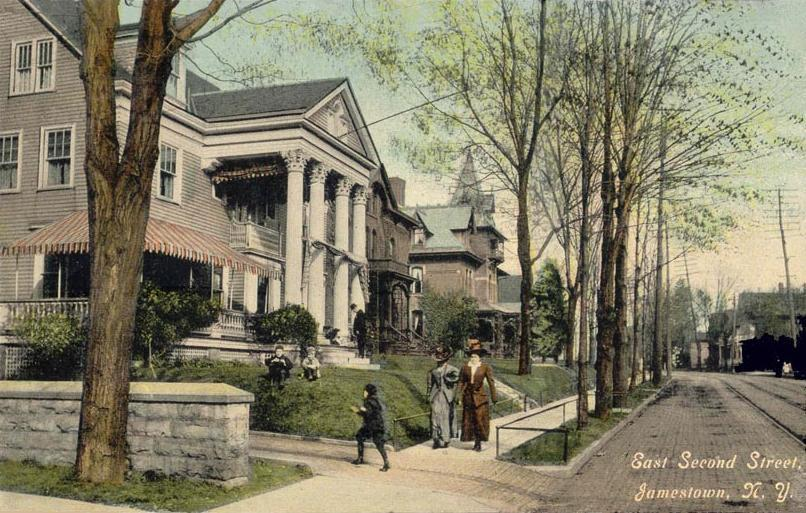
East Second Street, c. 1910

In 1921, the Zonta Club was organized. In 1925, the Hotel Samuels was sold. That same year, the Scottish Rite Temple was formally opened and taxpayers voted a $350,000 bond issue for the Third Street Bridge. The following year, Third Street Bridge was completed and it still stands today. In 1927, Jamestown celebrated the centennial of its incorporation as a village. Lars Larson was elected mayor the same year. In 1930, Samuel A. Carlson served as mayor once again. In 1931, a fire destroyed the old Martyn Factory. Also, the city purchases Niagara, Lockport and Ontario Power Company.

In 1932, the ground was broken for the new armory, the Erie Railroad station was dedicated, and the Community Chest was permanently formed. In 1933, Elk Furniture Company was sold. Also, Milton Carlson and Frederick Larson took over Jamestown Airport. The board of education assumed title to school forest. Also in 1933, city councilman Leon F. Roberts was elected mayor. In 1934, Jamestown Airport Corp. offered an airport to the city and the city secured the old armory as a relief center. As part of The New Deal, ground was broken for a new high school, which provided jobs during the Great Depression.

In 1935, the Board of Education opened the new industrial arts building and City Council approved $314,000 airport for North Main Street site. In November, Jamestown High School was formally dedicated. In 1937, the Temple Hesed Abraham was dedicated and the Alfred Collegiate Extension Center opened with 80 students. In 1938, Kevin McElrath became mayor and Jamestown General Hospital's maternity annex opened. In 1939, twelve local plans surveyed by the government to produce supplies in wartime. Also, the city's new airport was formally dedicated.

In 1940, the PONY league baseball began and Co. E was inducted into federal service. In 1941, Jamestown Municipal Stadium was dedicated and Samuel A. Stroth was elected mayor. In 1942, East Second Street widening was ordered and flames destroyed the old state armory. In 1945, Jamestown was hit by a tornado. In 1946, Dr. Carlyle C. Ring was named superintendent of schools. C.C. Ring Elementary School presently stands, in his honor. In 1950, Jamestown Community College was opened.

In 1951, Stanley A. Weeks was elected mayor and the addition to the municipal power plant was opened. In 1954, Samuel A. Stroth was elected mayor and Allegheny Airlines began east-west flight via Jamestown. In 1955, Carl F. Sanford was elected mayor. In 1956, Lucille Ball and Desi Arnaz visited Jamestown. In 1957, a $400,000 runway improvement to Jamestown Municipal Airport was added. In 1958, a new sewage disposal plant was opened, Buffalo Street pumping station was modernized, and a new wing opened at Jamestown General Hospital. In 1959, Jamestown's new post office was started. In 1960, Jamestown celebrated the sesquicentennial of the first house erected here. That same year, Mohawk Airlines started to serve Jamestown.

In 1961, Jamestown Community College moved into new Falconer Street campus and William D. Whitehead was elected mayor. In 1963, the City's first parking ramp opened at Main and Second Streets and Frederick H. Dunn elected mayor. Additionally, Grandin Mills on Allen Street was destroyed by fire and singer Natalie Merchant was born in Jamestown. In 1964, the Washington Street Bridge was completed. In 1967, an addition to Jamestown High School was completed. Also, Jamestown Community College opened a new Science and Engineering Building. In that same year, Charles B. Magnuson was elected mayor. In 1968, an addition to the James Prendergast Free Library was completed. In 1969, the Cherry Street parking ramp was opened, passenger rail service to Jamestown discontinued the next year by Erie-Lackawanna Railway, Stanley N. Lundine was elected mayor, and the New Gustavus Adolphus Children's Home opened. In 1970, the Final approval was granted for the Brooklyn Square Urban Renewal Project.

Throughout the 1970s, homes in Brooklyn Square were relocated as well as many stores and shops. A second Urban Renewal Project was proposed in 2006, and the project began in 2007. Jamestown has hosted thirteen Babe Ruth World Series since 1980 and hosted the 13-Year-Old Babe Ruth World Series in 2008. The James Prendergast Library has regularly ranked in the top ten in the nation among those that service populations of 25,000–49,999, according to HAPLR, with a peak ranking of fourth in 2004..

=== 21st century ===
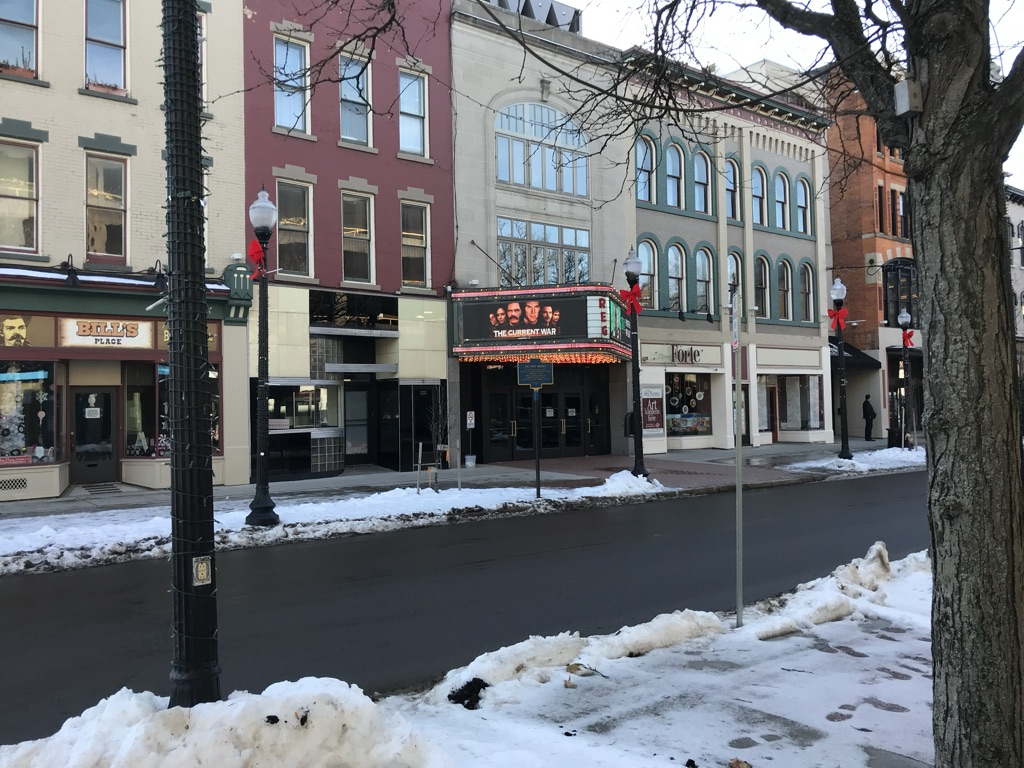
Downtown Jamestown in winter

On August 1, 2018, Jamestown opened the Jamestown National Comedy Center. This became the official National Comedy Center, receiving national designation from Congress.

== Geography ==
Jamestown is 71 miles (114 km) southwest of Buffalo, 158 miles (254 km) north of Pittsburgh, and 145 miles (233 km) northeast of Cleveland.

The Chadakoin River runs through Jamestown. Jamestown is situated at the eastern tip of Chautauqua Lake.

=== Climate ===
Jamestown has a humid continental climate (Köppen Dfb). Winters are cold and snowy, while summers are warm and humid.

Climate data for Jamestown, New York (1991−2020 normals, extremes 1895−present)
Month	Jan	Feb	Mar	Apr	May	Jun	Jul	Aug	Sep	Oct	Nov	Dec	Year
Record high °F (°C)	72 (22)	73 (23)	82 (28)	92 (33)	96 (36)	103 (39)	100 (38)	99 (37)	98 (37)	90 (32)	80 (27)	73 (23)	103 (39)
Mean maximum °F (°C)	55.1 (12.8)	55.4 (13.0)	67.5 (19.7)	79.3 (26.3)	85.1 (29.5)	88.7 (31.5)	89.4 (31.9)	88.5 (31.4)	86.9 (30.5)	77.8 (25.4)	67.8 (19.9)	56.8 (13.8)	91.0 (32.8)
Mean daily maximum °F (°C)	32.4 (0.2)	34.6 (1.4)	43.5 (6.4)	56.9 (13.8)	68.8 (20.4)	76.5 (24.7)	80.3 (26.8)	79.4 (26.3)	73.0 (22.8)	60.6 (15.9)	48.0 (8.9)	37.2 (2.9)	57.6 (14.2)
Daily mean °F (°C)	24.2 (−4.3)	25.2 (−3.8)	33.3 (0.7)	45.4 (7.4)	56.5 (13.6)	65.1 (18.4)	68.8 (20.4)	67.8 (19.9)	61.2 (16.2)	50.0 (10.0)	39.3 (4.1)	30.2 (−1.0)	47.2 (8.4)
Mean daily minimum °F (°C)	16.1 (−8.8)	15.8 (−9.0)	23.1 (−4.9)	34.0 (1.1)	44.3 (6.8)	53.7 (12.1)	57.4 (14.1)	56.1 (13.4)	49.5 (9.7)	39.4 (4.1)	30.6 (−0.8)	23.2 (−4.9)	36.9 (2.7)
Mean minimum °F (°C)	−5.7 (−20.9)	−3.5 (−19.7)	2.2 (−16.6)	21.9 (−5.6)	30.2 (−1.0)	39.3 (4.1)	46.6 (8.1)	45.0 (7.2)	36.5 (2.5)	27.4 (−2.6)	17.7 (−7.9)	6.8 (−14.0)	−9.4 (−23.0)
Record low °F (°C)	−31 (−35)	−31 (−35)	−23 (−31)	−1 (−18)	19 (−7)	27 (−3)	36 (2)	28 (−2)	24 (−4)	13 (−11)	−6 (−21)	−21 (−29)	−31 (−35)
Average precipitation inches (mm)	3.81 (97)	2.70 (69)	3.16 (80)	3.91 (99)	3.94 (100)	4.36 (111)	4.55 (116)	3.59 (91)	4.19 (106)	4.11 (104)	3.69 (94)	3.92 (100)	45.93 (1,167)
Average snowfall inches (cm)	29.8 (76)	19.3 (49)	15.3 (39)	2.7 (6.9)	0.0 (0.0)	0.0 (0.0)	0.0 (0.0)	0.0 (0.0)	0.0 (0.0)	0.4 (1.0)	9.3 (24)	21.6 (55)	98.4 (250)
Average extreme snow depth inches (cm)	11.2 (28)	10.2 (26)	8.0 (20)	1.9 (4.8)	0.0 (0.0)	0.0 (0.0)	0.0 (0.0)	0.0 (0.0)	0.0 (0.0)	0.3 (0.76)	6.1 (15)	8.9 (23)	14.9 (38)
Average precipitation days (≥ 0.01 in)	19.9	16.0	14.6	14.0	13.3	12.9	12.3	11.5	11.0	14.4	14.3	17.8	172.0
Average snowy days (≥ 0.1 in)	13.8	10.7	6.5	1.5	0.0	0.0	0.0	0.0	0.0	0.4	3.8	9.9	46.6
Source: NOAA

== Demographics ==
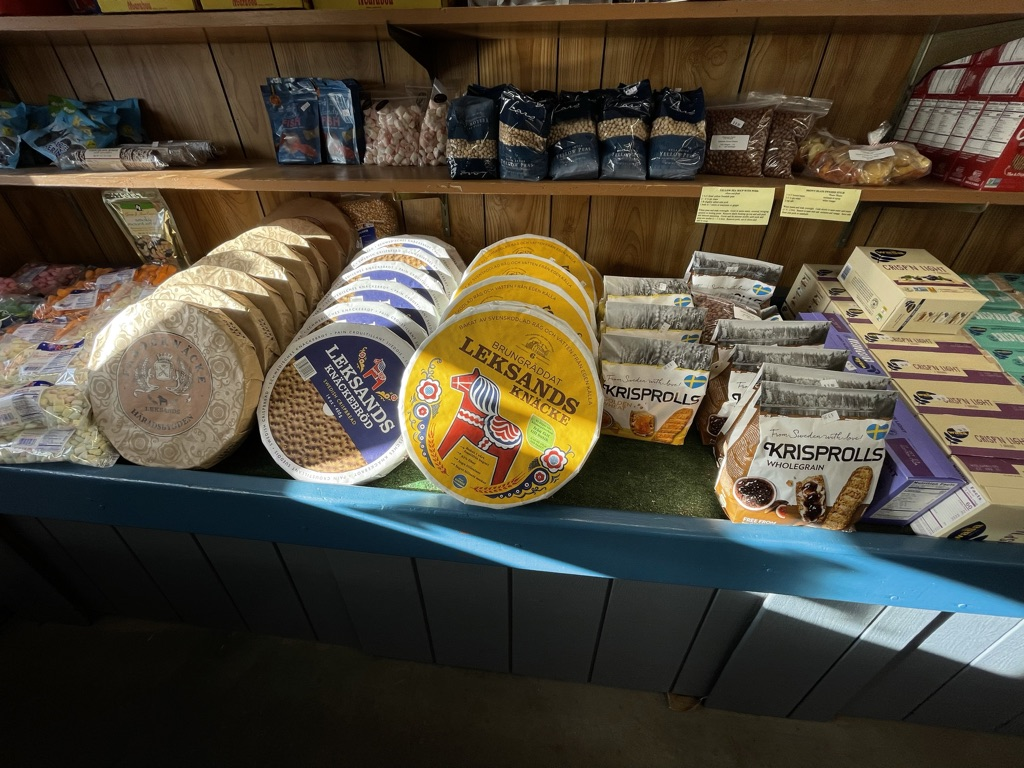
Swedish goods for sale in Jamestown

Historical population
Census	Pop.	Note	%±
1860	3,155		—
1870	5,336		69.1%
1880	9,357		75.4%
1890	16,038		71.4%
1900	22,892		42.7%
1910	31,297		36.7%
1920	38,917		24.3%
1930	45,155		16.0%
1940	42,638		−5.6%
1950	43,354		1.7%
1960	41,818		−3.5%
1970	39,795		−4.8%
1980	35,755		−10.2%
1990	34,681		−3.0%
2000	31,730		−8.5%
2010	31,146		−1.8%
2020	28,712		−7.8%
U.S. Decennial Census

=== 2020 census ===
As of the 2020 census, Jamestown had a population of 28,712. The median age was 38.9 years. 22.3% of residents were under the age of 18 and 17.5% of residents were 65 years of age or older. For every 100 females there were 96.0 males, and for every 100 females age 18 and over there were 93.9 males age 18 and over.

100.0% of residents lived in urban areas, while 0.0% lived in rural areas.

There were 12,641 households in Jamestown, of which 26.1% had children under the age of 18 living in them. Of all households, 29.7% were married-couple households, 24.9% were households with a male householder and no spouse or partner present, and 34.3% were households with a female householder and no spouse or partner present. About 38.5% of all households were made up of individuals and 14.7% had someone living alone who was 65 years of age or older.

There were 14,430 housing units, of which 12.4% were vacant. The homeowner vacancy rate was 1.9% and the rental vacancy rate was 10.2%.

Racial composition as of the 2020 census
Race	Number	Percent
White	23,592	82.7%
Black or African American	168	0.6%
American Indian and Alaska Native	164	0.6%
Asian	166	0.6%
Native Hawaiian and Other Pacific Islander	15	0.1%
Some other race	1,398	4.9%
Two or more races	3,054	10.6%
Hispanic or Latino (of any race)	3,843	13.4%

=== 2000 census ===
As of the census of 2000, there were 31,730 people, 13,558 households, and 7,904 families residing in the city. The population density was 3,534.6 inhabitants per square mile (1,364.7/km^{2}). There were 15,027 housing units at an average density of 1,673.9 per square mile (646.3/km^{2}). The racial makeup of the city was 91.52% White, 3.39% African American, 0.64% Native American, 0.44% Asian, 0.05% Pacific Islander, 1.8% from other races, and 2.16% from two or more races. Regarding ethnicity the largest ethnic group reported in the 2000 Census was Italian and the second largest was Swedish. 19.7% were of Italian, 18.1% Swedish, 12.8% German, 9.0% Irish, 8.7% English and 5.5% American ancestry. Hispanic or Latino people of any race were 4.94% of the population, according to Census 2000

Historically, up until the 1980s, Jamestown comprised primarily people of Italian or Swedish descent, about 50% of the population being of Italian descent, and fifty percent being of Swedish descent. Jamestown's strong heritage is showcased at the local museum, The Fenton History Center, which boasts both a Swedish Room and an Italian Room.

There were 13,558 households, out of which 29.4% had children under the age of 18 living with them, 39.1% were married couples living together, 14.5% had a female householder with no husband present, and 41.7% were non-families. 35.0% of all households were made up of individuals, and 13.9% had someone living alone who was 65 years of age or older. The average household size was 2.29 and the average family size was 2.94.

In the city, the age distribution of the population shows 25.8% under the age of 18, 9.1% from 18 to 24, 28.1% from 25 to 44, 20.9% from 45 to 64, and 16.0% who were 65 years of age or older. The median age was 36 years. For every 100 females, there were 91.0 males. For every 100 females age 18 and over, there were 87.3 males.

The median income for a household in the city was $25,837, and the median income for a family was $33,675. Males had a median income of $30,003 versus $20,039 for females. The per capita income for the city was $15,316. About 15.8% of families and 19.5% of the population were below the poverty line, including 29.1% of those under age 18 and 10.2% of those age 65 or over.

== Economy ==
The Jamestown area has a few large manufacturing plants that are major employers in this region. The area was once known as the "furniture capital of the world" for its many furniture and brass hardware manufacturers.

UPMC Chautauqua is a regional hospital that was founded as WCA Hospital (Women's Christian Association) on May 23, 1885, and included a nursing school until Jamestown Community College filled the need with a two-year RN nursing program. Integrated with UPMC (University of Pittsburgh Medical Center) in 2016, it has a school of Medical Technology and Radiology Technology. Jamestown General Hospital still stands on Jones Hill and is part of UPMC Chautauqua. It houses mental health units as well as physical, drug, and alcohol rehab units. The main campus of UPMC Chautauqua (formerly known as WCA Hospital or UPMC Chautauqua WCA Hospital) is located on the corner of Allen Street and Foote Avenue.

Chautauqua County has over 1,500 farms. Although its primary agricultural product is milk, Chautauqua County is also the state's greatest producer of wine and jelly grapes. The area's production of Concord grapes is one of the nation's largest, second only to California.

Cummins - Jamestown Engine Plant (JEP) is located six miles outside of Jamestown in the town of Busti. It is the largest single employer in the city, with more than 1,500 employees. They produce heavy duty diesel engines for agricultural, industrial, and military purposes.

== Arts and culture ==
=== Museums ===
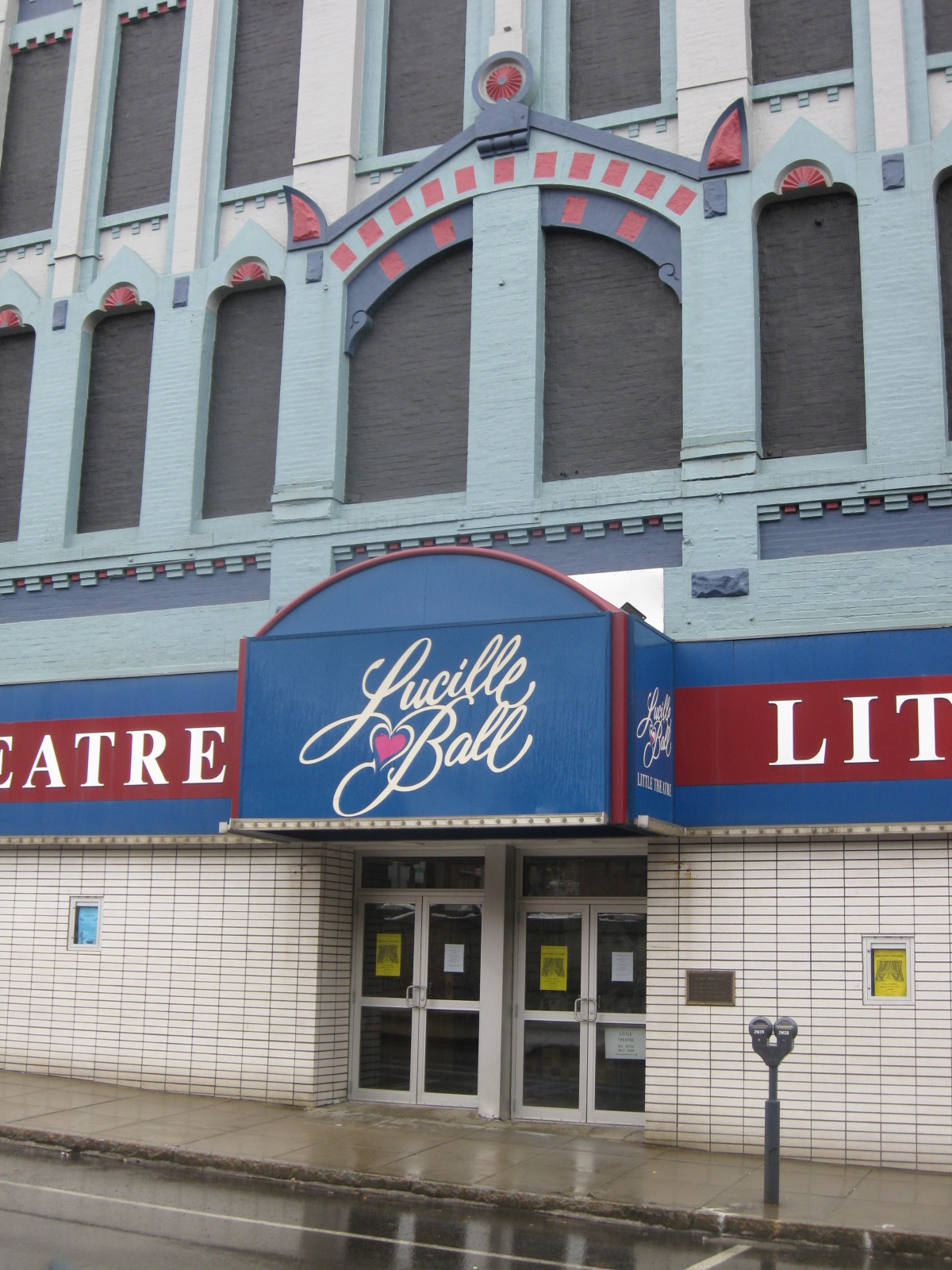
The Lucille Ball Little Theatre in Ball's hometown of Jamestown

- The Fenton History Center, located in the former Gov. Reuben Fenton Mansion is named for former resident Reuben Fenton, the 25th Governor of New York.
- The Lucille Ball-Desi Arnaz Center is dedicated to the city's best-known daughter, Lucille Ball, and held a ceremony in honor of what would have been Ball's 100th birthday in August 2011. Washington Street Bridge has also been fully rebuilt and renovated and renamed the Lucy Desi Bridge.
- The Jamestown Gateway Train Station at 211-217 West Second Street in downtown Jamestown
- The National Comedy Center opened on August 1, 2018. It currently holds the personal archives of George Carlin, Shelley Berman and the Smothers Brothers.
- The Robert H. Jackson Center was built to preserve the life and legacy of Robert H. Jackson while educating the community about justice and tolerance with a continuing emphasis on the Nuremberg Trials.
- The Roger Tory Peterson Institute of Natural History continues the legacy of Roger Tory Peterson by promoting the teaching and study of nature, and to thereby create knowledge of and appreciation and responsibility for the natural world.

=== Sports ===
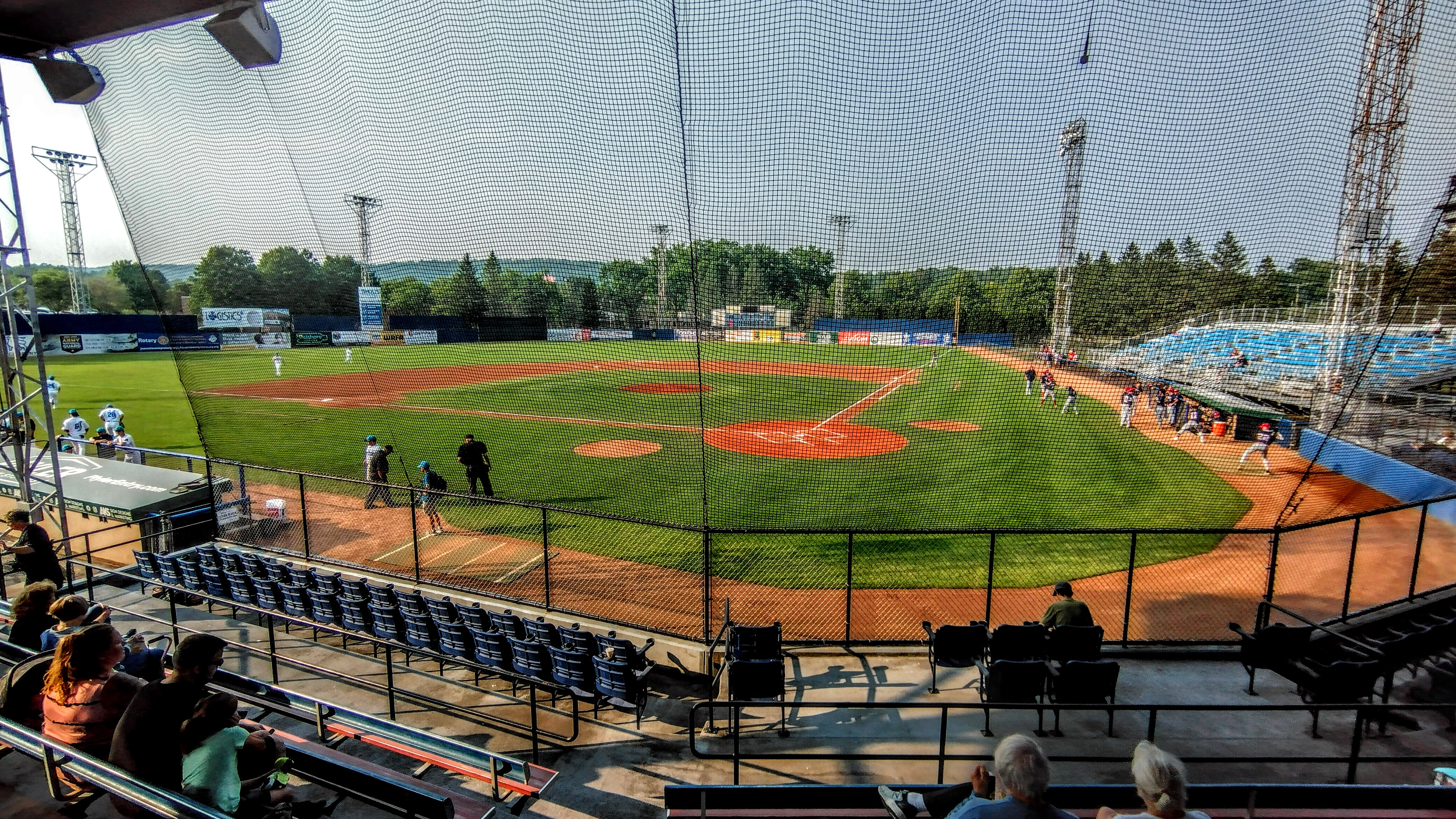
Russell Diethrick Park, home of the Jamestown Tarp Skunks

Jamestown was the home city for the Jamestown Jammers baseball team of the New York–Penn League. The Jammers were the Single A Short Season affiliate of the Pittsburgh Pirates. Following the 2014 season, the Jammers announced they would be relocating to Morgantown, West Virginia. It was later announced that a new team in the Prospect League would replace the Jammers, and the team would keep the name. The Jammers played in Jamestown until 2019, when the team was moved to Milwaukee, WI. However, the franchise was donated to Jamestown Community Baseball, LLC, and has been community-owned since. The team currently plays as the Jamestown Tarp Skunks in the Perfect Game Collegiate Baseball League, with home games at Russell Diethrick Park.

Members of the Jamestown baseball club, 1890. Kelly (fifth column, bottom) was an early African American player. Roxburgh (third column, bottom) was a former Major Leaguer.

The Jamestown Jackals are a professional basketball team which competes in the Basketball Super League (BSL). Founded and owned by Jamestown native Kayla Crosby in 2016, the team plays their games at Jamestown Community College. The team earned national attention from a 2021 GQ exposé detailing former Division I basketball star Anthony Estes' journey from homelessness to professional basketball with the Jackals.

Northwest Arena is a 1,900 seat ice arena in the city. Among the teams that have played in the arena as primary tenants included the Jamestown Rebels and Jamestown Ironmen of the North American Hockey League, the Jamestown Jets of the Greater Metro Junior A Hockey League, the Jamestown Vikings of the Mid-Atlantic Hockey League, the Jamestown Titans of the North Eastern Hockey League, and the Southern Tier Xpress of the North American 3 Hockey League.

Jamestown High School's boys and girls basketball teams have both won numerous Sectional and Division titles, with the basketball team winning back to back Section VI titles in 2009–10, 2010–11 while reaching the NYSPHSAA Class AA State Championship in 2011. The High School football team has been to five New York State Championships, losing in 1993, and winning in 1994, 1995, 2000 and 2014.

Jamestown hosted its 15th Babe Ruth World Series in August 2011.

Jamestown hosted, at what is now Northwest Arena, three exhibition games prior to the start of the 2011 World Junior Ice Hockey Championships.

=== Retail ===
Chautauqua Mall is in nearby Lakewood; most of the Jamestown area's big-box stores are located just outside city limits in Lakewood and West Ellicott, a stretch between Lakewood and Jamestown known by the Census Bureau as Jamestown West.

== Government ==
The government of the City of Jamestown is a mayor-council form of government.

=== Executive branch ===
The executive branch consists of a mayor elected to four-year terms without term limits, and the heads of the departments, most of them appointed by the mayor.

This section lists the mayors of Jamestown, New York.

#	Mayor name	Took office	Left office	Political party
1	Oscar F. Price	April 13, 1886	May 7, 1894	
2	Eleazer Green	May 7, 1894	1896	Republican
3	Oscar F. Price	1896	April 11, 1898	
4	Henry H. Cooper	April 11, 1898	1900	
5	John Emil Johnson	1900	April 9, 1906	Republican
6	James L. Weeks	April 9, 1906	1908	Republican
7	Samuel A. Carlson	1908	1928	Republican
8	Lars Larson	1928	1930	
9	Samuel A. Carlson	1930	January 1, 1934	Republican
10	Leon F. Roberts	January 1, 1934	January 1, 1938	Democratic
11	Harry C. Erickson	January 1, 1938	1942	Good Government Party
12	Samuel A. Stroth	1942	January 1, 1952	Progressive Party
13	Stanley A. Weeks	January 1, 1952	January 1, 1954	Greater Jamestown Party
14	Samuel A. Stroth	January 1, 1954	January 2, 1956	Progressive Party
15	Carl F. Sanford	January 2, 1956	January 1, 1962	Greater Jamestown Party
16	William D. Whitehead	January 1, 1962	January 1, 1964	Taxpayer's Party; Independent
17	Frederick H. Dunn	January 1, 1964	1967	Democratic
18	Charles B. Magnuson	1967	1969	Republican
19	Stanley Nelson Lundine	1969	1976	Democratic
20	Steven B. Carlson	1976	1990	Democratic
21	Donald W. Ahlstrom	1990	1992	Republican
22	Carolyn Gifford Seymour	1992	1994	Democratic
23	Richard A. Kimball, Jr.	1994	January 1, 2000	Republican
24	Samuel Teresi	January 1, 2000	January 1, 2020	Democratic
25	Eddie Sundquist	January 1, 2020	January 1, 2024	Democratic
26	Kim Ecklund	January 1, 2024	Incumbent	Republican

=== Legislative branch ===
The legislative body of Jamestown consists of nine council members, who are elected every two years without any term limits. Six council members represent each of the city's six wards, and three additional council members are known as councilmembers-at-large, representing the entire city. The table below outlines the current members of the Jamestown City Council.

==== Current ====
Name and Party	Position
Russell J. Bonfiglio (R)	Council At-Large
Jeremy Engquist (D)	Council At-Large
Daniel Gonzalez (D)	Council At-Large
Brent P. Sheldon (R)	College Ward I
Anthony J. Dolce (R)	Lakeview Ward II
Regina L. Brackman (D)	Chadakoin Ward III (Council President)
Doug Scotchmer (D)	Bergman Ward IV
Hannah Jaroszynski (D)	Forest Ward V
Andrew G. Faulkner (R)	Willard Heights Ward VI

== Education ==
=== Post-secondary education ===
Jamestown Community College provides a two-year education and four-year degrees through matriculation agreements with several universities. Recent additions to the campus include a state-of-the-art LEED-certified science building and three residence halls. Jamestown Business College offered two-year and four-year business degrees. However, Jamestown Business College officially closed on February 28, 2025.

=== Primary education ===
Founded in 1867, Jamestown Public Schools is the city's sole school district. The district also extends into several bordering towns. Jamestown Public Schools include: Jamestown High School; three middle schools, Persell Middle School, George Washington Middle School, and Thomas Jefferson Middle School; as well as five neighborhood elementary schools: Lincoln elementary school, Fletcher elementary school, Clinton V Bush elementary school, CC Ring elementary school, and Love elementary school.

The former Rogers Elementary School now functions as a Success Academy for selected Jamestown area students. A disciplinary Tech Academy, located on Fourth Street is also part of the Jamestown Public School system.

The "Red Raider" Marching Band won the NY State Field Band Conference Championship in 2014, 2015 and 2018.

== Media ==
=== Broadcast stations ===
The following stations are licensed to Jamestown or its immediate suburbs:

==== AM radio ====
- WJTN – 1240 – gold-based adult contemporary music (simulcast on FM 101.3)
- WKSN – 1340 – oldies

==== FM radio ====
- WUBJ – 88.1 – NPR news/talk (simulcast of WBFO in Buffalo)
- WYRR – 88.9 – radio evangelism (SonLife owned-and-operated station)
- WNJA – 89.7 – Classical (simulcast of WNED-FM in Buffalo)
- WCGN – 90.9 – contemporary Christian music (Family Life Network owned-and-operated station)
- WWSE – 93.3 – hot adult contemporary
- WIHR-LP - 94.1 - religious (3ABN Radio)
- WLKW – 95.3 – contemporary Christian music (K-Love owned-and-operated station, licensed to Celoron)
- W262BX – 100.3 – country (simulcast of WBKX in Fredonia)
- WHUG – 101.9 – country
- WOGM-LP – 104.7 – religious (Fundamental Broadcasting Network)
- WKZA – 106.9 – contemporary hit radio (licensed to Lakewood)
- WRFA-LP – 107.9 – community radio

==== TV ====
WNYB, channel 26, is the only station licensed to Jamestown. It has no local operations and was, for all but its first three years of existence operated out of Buffalo. The station, a TCT owned-and-operated station, now operates the straight TCT national feed. Its transmitter is located well north of Jamestown, in Arkwright.

Previous transmitters that had carried Trinity Broadcasting Network (W10BH) and WNED-TV (W46BA) have since been shut down.

WNY News Now, based in Jamestown, operates a daily local newscast that is distributed online. Lilly Broadcasting, owners of radio stations in Warren, Pennsylvania and TV stations in Erie, Pennsylvania, signed a shared services agreement with WNY News Now in July 2021.

==== NOAA Weather Radio ====
- WNG541 – 162.525 (licensed to Frewsburg; operated out of the National Weather Service office in Cheektowaga)

=== Newspapers ===
The daily The Post-Journal is published in Jamestown. Free weekly papers distributed in the city include the Jamestown Pennysaver, the Chautauqua Star, and the Jamestown Gazette.

== Transportation ==
=== Air ===
The Chautauqua County-Jamestown Airport (JHW) is north of the city and provides charter air service.

There is also a county-wide bus service (CARTS) and taxi service through various companies including Rainbow Cab and Uber.

=== Rail ===
Present-day Jamestown is on the mainline of the Western New York and Pennsylvania Railroad which provides freight service. A proposal to connect the Western New York and Pennsylvania to the New York and Lake Erie Railroad would allow for excursion rail service; to do so, the New York and Lake Erie Railroad would need to undergo extensive rehabilitation of the rail lines near the junction between the two rail lines at Waterboro, several miles east of Jamestown. Amtrak does not serve the area, except through contract with Coach USA to provide Amtrak Thruway service along Coach USA's existing bus route to bus Amtrak passengers to and from the Exchange Street station in Buffalo.

Until 1950, two railroad companies traveled through Jamestown:

- Erie Railroad – mainline passing through Jamestown (New York to Chicago), whose last trains were the Atlantic Express/Pacific Express (discontinued, 1965) and the Lake Cities (discontinued, 1970).
- Jamestown, Westfield and Northwestern Railroad - freight and passenger interurban train company, which went defunct in 1950.

In 1976, the Erie-Lackawanna Railroad was absorbed into Conrail, and then ultimately, by Norfolk Southern Railway and CSX Transportation in 1998.

The Erie Railroad's former Jamestown Station still exists and was listed on the National Register of Historic Places in 2003. It is now home to a portion of the National Comedy Center which opened in Summer of 2018.

An electric interurban railroad—Jamestown, Westfield and Northwestern Railroad—connected all three above towns (Jamestown-Mayville-Westfield) and ran along the north side of Lake Chautauqua. The Jamestown, Westfield, and Northwestern Railroad ended passenger operation in 1947, continued with freight, then quit entirely in 1950. Its rails and right-of-way have slowly disappeared.

=== Highways ===
The Southern Tier Expressway (I-86/Route 17) passes to the north and east of Jamestown, with direct access to the city from Exits 12 and 13. New York State Routes 60 and 394 (Fairmount Avenue on the west side, Second Street on the east) pass through the city north-to-south and east-to-west, respectively; Route 430 begins in Jamestown and follows a westward path. US 62 passes by Jamestown to the southeast.

== Notable people ==
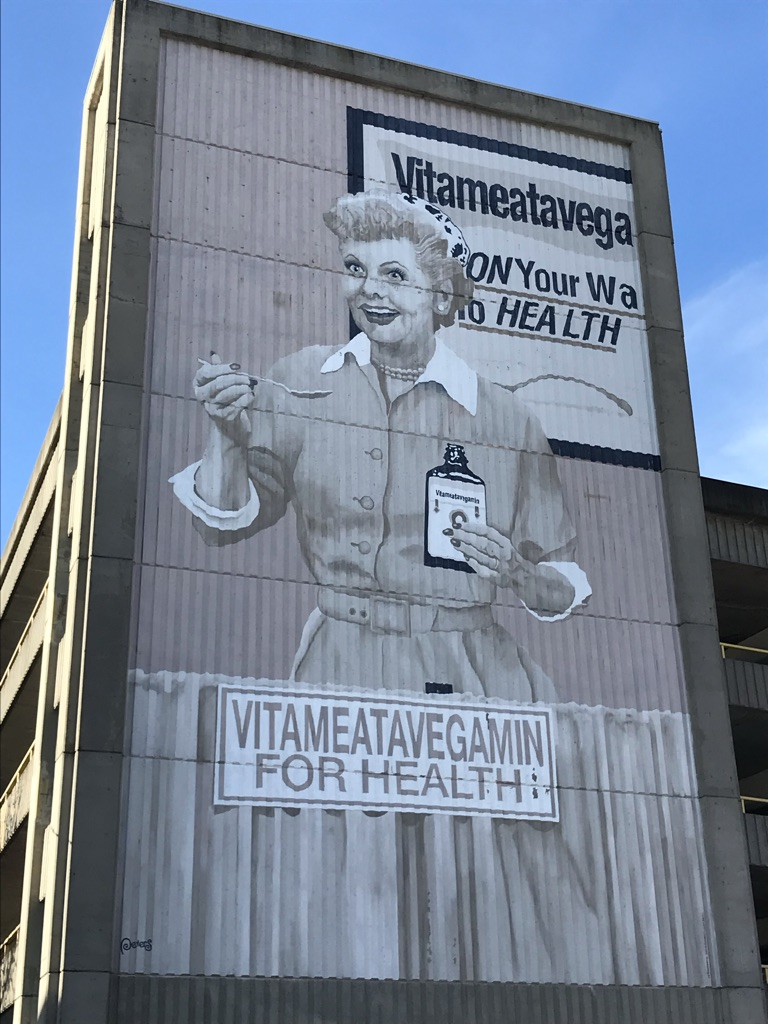
Painting of Lucille Ball on downtown Jamestown parking garage

=== Business ===
- John Jachym, businessman and sportsman
- Reginald Lenna, businessman and philanthropist
- Willis R. Whitney, founder of the research laboratory of the General Electric Company

=== Entertainment and arts ===
- Douglas Ahlstedt, opera singer
- Theodore Albrecht, music historian
- Brad Anderson, cartoonist
- Mitchell Anderson, notable character actor
- Marshall Arisman, illustrator
- Fred Ball, movie studio executive, actor, brother of Lucille Ball
- Lucille Ball, actress, comedian, and businesswoman; born in Jamestown and raised in nearby Celoron; two life-size statues of her are in Celoron Park
- Suzan Ball, actress and second cousin of Lucille and Fred Ball
- Rob Buck, founding member of 10,000 Maniacs
- Nick Carter, singer, member of the Backstreet Boys
- Dennis Drew, keyboardist for 10,000 Maniacs
- William Feather, publisher and author
- Vagn F. Flyger, wildlife biologist, one of the world's foremost authorities on squirrels
- Gilbert Dennison Harris, notable geologist
- Hayward A. Harvey, inventor of the Harvey process
- Shawn Higbee, professional motorcycle racer
- Harry Pratt Judson, second President of the University of Chicago
- Laura Kightlinger, actress, comedian, writer
- John Lombardo, founding member of 10,000 Maniacs
- Janelle Lynch, photographer
- Natalie Merchant, singer; her band 10,000 Maniacs originated in Jamestown; their gold and platinum records hang in Jamestown City Hall
- The Mighty Wallop!, rock band
- Pandora Boxx, drag queen, contestant on second season of reality-television series RuPaul's Drag Race
- Marc Parnell, author and ornithologist
- Julie Anne Peters, author
- Roger Tory Peterson, naturalist
- Charles Pitts, radio engineer and LGBTQ+ freeform radio pioneer
- Jackson Rohm, country/pop musician
- Elliott Fitch Shepard, owner of the Mail and Express newspaper
- Ira Spring, photographer, author
- Jud Strunk, singer/songwriter
- Dale Willman, award-winning journalist
- Thomas B. Woodworth, newspaper publisher, lawyer

=== Military ===
- Charles Justin Bailey, US Army major general
- Wilfred Beaver, World War I flying ace
- Alfred Eugene Bradley, US Army brigadier general, chief surgeon at the American Expeditionary Forces headquarters during World War I
- John B. Hayes, retired US Coast Guard Admiral and 16th Commandant of the US Coast Guard
- Harriet L. Leete, Red Cross nurse in World War I
- Selden E. Marvin, Adjutant General of New York
- James M. Young, American Civil War recipient of the Medal of Honor

=== Science and technology ===
- Louis W. Roberts, microwave physicist

=== Sports ===
- Cheryl Bailey, Executive Director of the National Women's Soccer League
- Hugh Bedient, former MLB pitcher
- Walter Brown, former MLB player
- Leon Carlson, former MLB relief pitcher
- Stephen Carlson, NFL tight end, Chicago Bears
- Parke H. Davis, football player and coach
- Michael G. Foster, karate pioneer
- Roger Goodell, NFL commissioner, born and raised in Jamestown
- Dwight Lowry, former MLB catcher
- Jim McCusker, retired NFL player
- Irv Noren, former professional baseball and basketball player
- Jaysean Paige, professional basketball player
- Nick Sirianni, NFL head coach, Philadelphia Eagles

=== Politics ===
- Augustus F. Allen, former US Congressman
- Alfred W. Benson, former US Senator from Kansas
- Samuel A. Carlson, former mayor of Jamestown
- Reuben Fenton, congressman, senator, and Governor of New York; born in the nearby Town of Carroll and made his home in Jamestown
- Andy Goodell, New York State Assemblyman
- Charles Goodell, former US Senator, father of NFL Commissioner Roger Goodell
- Mihal Grameno, Albanian rilindas, politician, writer, freedom fighter, journalist
- Alva L. Hager, former US Congressman from Iowa
- Abner Hazeltine, former U.S. Congressman
- Robert H. Jackson, U.S. Solicitor General, U.S. Attorney General, U.S. Supreme Court associate justice and Nuremberg chief prosecutor, graduated from Jamestown High School, lived and practiced law in Jamestown from 1910–1934, was buried following an October 1954 funeral at Jamestown's St. Luke's Episcopal Church
- Nick Langworthy, U.S. representative for New York
- Stanley Lundine, politician, Mayor of Jamestown, Congressman, Lieutenant Governor of New York
- Richard P. Marvin, former US Congressman
- Francis W. Palmer, former US Congressman
- William Parment, former New York State Assemblyman
- Jess Present, former New York State Senator
- Porter Sheldon, former US Congressman
- George Stoneman, born in nearby Busti, New York, and studied at the Jamestown Academy, became a Civil War General and the 15th Governor of California
- Samuel Teresi, mayor of Jamestown
- Davis Hanson Waite, 8th Governor of Colorado
- Walter Washington, first African-American Mayor of Washington, D.C., raised in Jamestown

== Twin towns – sister cities ==
Jamestown is twinned with:

- Haicheng, Liaoning, China
- Jakobstad, Finland
- Cantù, Lombardy, Italy
- Jakova, Kosovo

== Sources ==
- Leet, Mert (Fall 2004). "One Day at . . . Mayville, N.Y.". Classic Trains Magazine: 72.

== Bibliography ==
- Lombardi, Peter A. (2014). Jamestown, New York: A Guide to the City and Its Urban Landscape. Albany: SUNY Press. ISBN 978-1-4384-4992-0.
- Middleton, William D. (1975). The Interurban Era. Milwaukee: Kalmbach Books. p. 432. ISBN 0-89024-003-5.
- Ahlstrom, Harold (1974). Jamestown and Chautauqua Lake Trolleys. Jamestown New York: Fenton Historical Society. OCLC 30403459.
- Middleton, William D. (1967). The Time of the Trolley. Milwaukee Wisconsin: Kalmbach Publishing. ISBN 0-89024-013-2.
