= Jamestown Engine Plant =

Engine manufacturing plant in Jamestown, New York

- Operated: 1974–present
- Location: 4720 Baker Street Extension; Jamestown, New York, United States
- Coordinates: 42°4′56″N 79°21′40″W
- Industry: Automotive
- Products: engines
- Employees: 1,700
- Volume: 998,000 square feet (92,700 m^{2})
- Owner: Cummins Inc.

Jamestown Engine Plant (JEP) is an engine manufacturing plant in Jamestown, New York owned by Cummins Inc. The plant has produced over 2.5 million heavy-duty engines since 1979.

== History ==
The plant was opened in August 1974 after Cummins acquired a metal-fabrication plant for large filing cabinets before being converted to manufacture engine components. It produced its first full engine (a 10-liter model) in 1979.

The plant reached 500,000 total engines produced by the year 2000. In 2002, the facility added 15-liter engine production. Also in the year, Cummins initiated a major transfer of its on-highway engine production operations from its Columbus Engine Plant in Columbus, Indiana, to the Jamestown plant, shifting 250 jobs to the New York facility.

In late 2009, Cummins announced temporary layoffs for about 400 workers at the Jamestown plant due to the anticipated post-spike slump in orders.

== Products ==
- Cummins ISX
- Cummins X15
