= Mass media in Erie, Pennsylvania =

Situated between three major United States cities and on the border with Canada, there are many sources of media in Erie, Pennsylvania. Erie is home to five major television broadcast networks, one daily newspaper, a city-regional magazine, several radio stations and one major social media news website.

== Television stations ==
Erie's unique position along the shores of Lake Erie can offer a wide variety of over-the-air television stations. Canada's CityTV (from its Woodstock, Ontario transmitter CITY-DT-2), CTV 2 (via CFPL-DT), and CBC Television (via CBLT-DT's repeater, CBLN) from London, Ontario can be viewed in portions of downtown Erie and areas north of Interstate 90. Additionally, select areas of the Erie region can receive broadcast channels from Buffalo, New York, Cleveland, Ohio, and Pittsburgh, Pennsylvania. The region itself, however, is served by five major television stations based in Erie. Erie is ranked as Designated Market Area #144 by the Nielsen Company.

Major Erie television affiliates include:

- WICU, NBC, channel 12
- WJET, ABC, channel 24
- WSEE, CBS, channel 35
- WQLN, PBS, channel 54
- WFXP, Fox, channel 66

Erie has an affiliate station of The CW (via The CW Plus), which is broadcast digitally over the air on WJET's digital subchannel 24–2, and on local cable systems. Erie does not have a MyNetworkTV affiliate, nor are any of the service's neighboring stations are carried on local providers in the area. Digital multicast networks are available on the subchannels of the stations above.

== Radio stations ==
The Erie region has a large list of AM and FM stations, with all major genres covered. Many of Erie's radio channels can be heard in Southern Ontario, Canada. Likewise, some London area, channels and radio stations can be picked up in various parts of the Erie shoreline.

=== FM ===
Stations with transmitters located within 30 miles (48 km) of Erie:

Callsign	Frequency	Power	Format	Owner	City of license
WEFR	88.1 MHz	630 watts	Christian	Family Stations, Inc	Erie
WMCE	88.5 MHz	750 watts	Classic hits	Mercyhurst University	Erie
WFSE	88.9 MHz	3,000 watts	Alternative rock	Edinboro University of Pennsylvania	Edinboro
WCGV	89.9 MHz	25,000 watts	Christian	Family Life Network	Cambridge Springs
WERG	90.5 MHz	2,750 watts	College	Gannon University	Erie
WQLN	91.3 MHz	35,000 watts	Public	Public Broadcasting of Northwest Pennsylvania, Inc	Erie
WICU-FM	92.7 MHz	6,000 watts	Top 40	SJL Broadcasting (SJL) of Pennsylvania, Inc)	Lawrence Park
WXCS-LP	92.9 MHz	90 watts	Community	Cambridge Community Radio Association	Cambridge Springs
WTWF	93.9 MHz	6,000 watts	Country	iHeartMedia,	Fairview
WXBB	94.7 MHz	1,700 watts	Adult hits	iHeartMedia,	Erie
WEBG	95.9 MHz	820 watts	Sports (simulcast with WFNN)	iHeartMedia,	Mina New York
WXTA	97.9 MHz	10,000 watts	Country	Cumulus Media	Edinboro
WXKC	99.9 MHz	50,000 watts	Adult contemporary	Cumulus Media	Erie
WQHZ	102.3 MHz	1,700 watts	Classic rock	Cumulus Media	Erie
WRTS	103.7 MHz	50,000 watts	Top 40	iHeartMedia,	Erie
WXKC HD2	104.3 MHz	173 watts	Classic hip hop	Cumulus Media	Erie
WXMJ	104.5 MHz	2,550 watts	Adult hits	Forever Broadcasting, LLC	Cambridge Springs
WRKT	104.9 MHz	4,200 watts	Rock	iHeartMedia,	Erie
WGOJ	105.5 MHz	6,000 watts	Christian	Bible Broadcasting Network, Inc	Conneaut, Ohio
WCTL	106.3 MHz	3,400 watts	Contemporary Christian	Inspiration Time, Inc	Union City
KEC58	162.400 MHz	750 watts	NOAA Weather Radio All Hazards (Weather radio)	National Weather Service / National Oceanic and Atmospheric Administration	Erie

=== AM ===
Stations with transmitters located within 30 miles (48 km) of Erie:

Callsign	Frequency	Power	Format	Owner	City of license
WRIE	1260 kHz	5,000 watts	Sports	Cumulus Media	Erie
WFNN	1330 kHz	5,000 watts	Sports	iHeartMedia,	Erie
WWOW	1360 kHz	5,000 watts (daytime); 35 watts (nighttime)	Oldies	Boomer Tunes Radio	Conneaut, Ohio
WWCB	1370 kHz	1,000 watts (daytime); 500 watts (nighttime)	Oldies	Corry Communications Corporation	Corry
WJET	1400 kHz	1,000 watts	News talk	iHeartMedia,	Erie
WPSE	1450 kHz	1,000 watts (daytime); 826 watts (nighttime)	Business news	Pennsylvania State University	Erie
WZTE	1530 kHz	4,800 watts (daytime); 250 watts (critical hours)		Inspiration Time, Inc.	Union City

== Print ==
As newspaper mergers occurred throughout the 20th century, Erie was left with one regional daily newspaper. Few community newspapers exist in the region. Erie has seen alternative magazines come and go as well.

=== Daily ===
- The Corry Journal
- Erie Times-News
- The Meadville Tribune

=== Weekly ===
- The Albion News
- The Edinboro News
- Erie Reader
- North East News-Journal
- West County News-Journal

=== Monthly ===
- Erie Gay News
- Great Lakes Life Magazine
- Lake Erie Lifestyle Magazine
