= WRTS =

Radio station in Erie, Pennsylvania

Coordinates: 42.090°N 79.943°W

- Erie, Pennsylvania; United States
- Broadcast area: Erie, Pennsylvania
- Frequency: 103.7 MHz
- Branding: Star 104

Programming
- Format: Top 40 (CHR)
- Affiliations: Premiere Networks

Ownership
- Owner: iHeartMedia, Inc.; (iHM Licenses, LLC)
- Sister stations: WFNN, WJET, WRKT, WEBG, WTWF, WXBB

History
- First air date: 1969; 57 years ago (as WWGO-FM)
- Former call signs: WWGO-FM (1969–1971); WCCK (1971–1991); WMXE (1991–1994)
- Call sign meaning: RTS, the backwards spelling of Star

Technical information
- Licensing authority: FCC
- Facility ID: 55028
- Class: B
- ERP: 50,000 watts
- HAAT: 152 meters (499 ft)

Links
- Public license information: Public file; LMS
- Webcast: Listen Live
- Website: star104.iheart.com

WRTS (103.7 FM, "Star 104") is an adult-leaning top 40 (CHR) radio station in Erie, Pennsylvania. WRTS's studios are located in the Boston Store building in downtown Erie while its transmitter is located near Knoyle Rd and Dewey Rd. The station is owned by iHeartMedia, and its 50,000 watt signal has a large coverage area stretching from Geneva-on-the-Lake, Ohio to Dunkirk, New York, as well the station can be heard across Lake Erie in parts of the Canadian province of Ontario.

WRTS is one of the most popular stations in the Erie area, and has been nominated for Top 40/CHR Station Of The Year: Markets 101+ at the Radio and Records conventions in both 2006 and 2007. Some of the syndicated shows that WRTS airs are Elvis Duran and the Morning Show (Monday to Friday), On Air with Ryan Seacrest (Monday to Friday), The New Hit List (Monday to Friday nights), American Top 40 (Sundays), On the Move with Enrique Santos (Saturdays), Most Requested Live with Romeo (Saturday nights), iHeartRadio Countdown (Sundays), and KPOP With JoJo (Sunday nights), all from iHeart's Premiere Networks subsidiary.

As WCCK, the station was previously known for being one of the last holdout Top-40 stations to compile its own record chart for airplay purposes; as such, several local hits that became popular in Erie but failed to break through nationwide got substantial airplay on WCCK in the 1980s as K104.

On March 27, 2019, Connoisseur Media announced that it would transfer WRTS along with its sister stations to iHeartMedia in exchange for WFRE and WFMD in the Frederick, Maryland market from the Aloha Station Trust. The sale closed on May 20, 2019.

On January 5, 2021, Star 104 began airing Elvis Duran for mornings which replaced The Star 104 Morning Show.

They are also one of the 4 radio stations featured at Waldameer & Water World include: Star 104 (WRTS), 99.9 Classy 100 (WXKC), 98.3 THE BULL(WYBL) and Rocket 105 WRKT.
