= WXTG =

WXTG may refer to:

- WXTG (AM), a radio station (1490 AM) licensed to Hampton, Virginia, United States
- WXTG-FM, a radio station (102.1 FM) licensed to Virginia Beach, Virginia, United States
