= WMCE =

WMCE may refer to:

- WMCE-FM, a radio station (88.5 FM) licensed to serve Erie, Pennsylvania, United States
- WZTE, a radio station (1530 AM) licensed to serve North East, Pennsylvania, which held the call sign WMCE from 2013 to 2017
