= WEBG (FM) =

Radio station in Mina, New York

Simulcasting WFNN, Erie, PA
- Mina, New York; United States
- Frequency: 95.9 MHz
- Branding: Fox Sports 1330 The Fan

Programming
- Format: Sports
- Affiliations: Fox Sports Radio

Ownership
- Owner: iHeartMedia; (iHM Licenses, LLC)
- Sister stations: WFNN, WJET, WRKT, WRTS, WTWF, WXBB

History
- First air date: November 27, 2017
- Former call signs: WJRK (2017); WLTM (2017–2020)
- Call sign meaning: Formerly used on WCHI-FM in Chicago

Technical information
- Licensing authority: FCC
- Facility ID: 191524
- Class: A
- ERP: 820 watts
- HAAT: 200 meters (660 ft)
- Transmitter coordinates: 42°11′51.2″N 79°45′10.2″W

Links
- Public license information: Public file; LMS
- Webcast: Listen live (via iHeartRadio)
- Website: sportsradio1330.iheart.com

WEBG (95.9 FM, "Fox Sports 1330") is a radio station licensed to Mina, New York, United States. Owned by iHeartMedia, it broadcasts a sports format as a simulcast of WFNN (1330 AM) in Erie, Pennsylvania, with transmitter sited near Northeast Sherman Rd and Miller Rd in Chautauqua County, New York. The station has a rimshot signal serving the nearby Erie market; however, it is unable to be heard in the city itself because of co-channel interference from 179,000-watt CFPL-FM from London, Ontario. Its signal is strongest in rural western Chautauqua County, New York, but is spotty in the population centers of Dunkirk, Fredonia and Jamestown.

WEBG is iHeart's only broadcast property in New York west of Rochester. It (and its predecessor Clear Channel) has historically owned stations across almost all markets of New York except Western New York. WEBG's minimal local operations are headquartered along with iHeart's stations in Erie at the Boston Store building.

== History ==
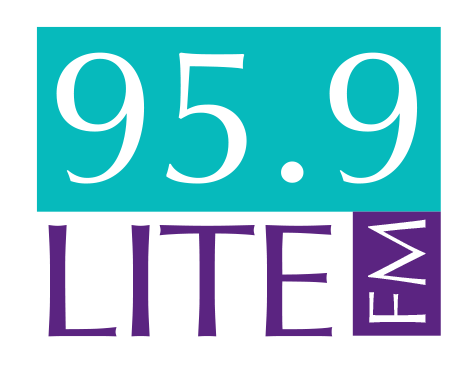
Original logo as 95.9 Lite FM.

It signed on as WJRK on November 27, 2017, soft launching with Christmas music for the holiday season. The station changed its call sign to WLTM on December 6, 2017, and officially launched on January 3, 2018, as adult contemporary 95.9 Lite FM, using an AC format syndicated from Westwood One.

On March 27, 2019, Connoisseur Media announced that it would transfer WLTM along with its sister stations to iHeartMedia in exchange for WFRE and WFMD in the Frederick, Maryland, market from the Aloha Station Trust. The sale closed on May 20, 2019.

From November 5 to December 25, 2019, the station broadcast Christmas music as Christmas 95.9. On December 26, 2019, the station flipped to talk radio as iHeartPodcast 95.9, with a schedule consisting exclusively of podcasts distributed by iHeartMedia and its subsidiaries, including Stuff You Should Know among others. The station changed its call sign to WEBG on September 14, 2020; the call sign was transferred from co-owned WCHI-FM in Chicago, which had used it when it was branded as "Big".

On January 10, 2022, WEBG flipped to Fox Sports Radio as a simulcast of WFNN in Erie. It was the last station to carry the iHeartPodcast format.
