= WTWF =

Radio station in Fairview, Pennsylvania

Coordinates: 42.027°N 80.121°W

Fairview, Pennsylvania; United States
- Broadcast area: Erie, Pennsylvania
- Frequency: 93.9 MHz
- Branding: 93.9 The Wolf

Programming
- Format: Country
- Affiliations: Premiere Networks

Ownership
- Owner: iHeartMedia, Inc.; (iHM Licenses, LLC)
- Sister stations: WFNN, WJET, WRKT, WEBG, WRTS, WXBB

History
- First air date: October 2001; 24 years ago
- Former call signs: WRPL (2001–2003); WUSE (2003–2006)
- Call sign meaning: W The WolF

Technical information
- Licensing authority: FCC
- Facility ID: 76244
- Class: A
- ERP: 6,000 watts
- HAAT: 91 meters (299 ft)

Links
- Public license information: Public file; LMS
- Webcast: Listen Live
- Website: 939thewolf.iheart.com

WTWF (93.9 FM) is a country music radio station in Erie, Pennsylvania, branded as "93.9 The Wolf". WTWF's studios are located in the Boston Store building in downtown Erie while its transmitter is located near the junction of Interstate 79 and Interstate 90. The station is owned by iHeartMedia. WTWF airs The Bobby Bones Show from WSIX-FM in Nashville Monday to Saturday mornings, The Wayne D Show Monday to Friday evenings also from WSIX-FM Nashville, After MidNite with Granger Smith overnights, Country House Party Saturday nights and "Woman of iHeartCountry" from iHeartMedia's Premiere Networks.

Prior to iHeartMedia ownership, WTWF aired content with live local personalities. From 2006 to 2019, local personalities such as Shannon Solo, Melissa Matthews, Johnny Marx, Bob 'Bobby D' Domingo, Chuck 'The Promo Guy' Rambaldo, Aimee 'The Outlaw' Clemson, Sammy Stone, Kyle Hendricks, Carrie Lee, Greg Mauz, Garrett Kelley, Brett Andrews, and Dan Sheldon all hosted live in-studio airshifts over the years on WTWF before the January 2020 iHeartMedia mass layoffs. As of January 2020, all local personalities heard on the station were laid off and all content is replaced by iHeartMedia's syndicated programs from Premiere Networks and the iHeartMedia Premium Choice lineup.

On March 27, 2019, Connoisseur Media announced that it would transfer WTWF along with its sister stations to iHeartMedia in exchange for WFRE and WFMD in the Frederick, Maryland market from the Aloha Station Trust. The sale closed on May 20, 2019.
