= WXBB =

Radio station in Erie, Pennsylvania

Coordinates: 42.041°N 80.068°W

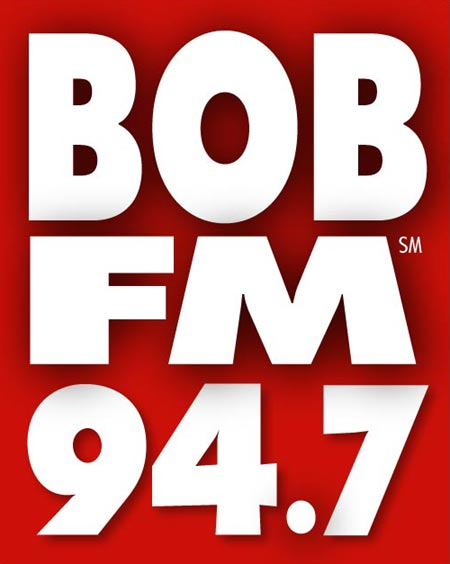
- Erie, Pennsylvania; United States
- Broadcast area: Erie, Pennsylvania
- Frequency: 94.7 MHz
- Branding: 94.7 Bob FM

Programming
- Format: Adult hits

Ownership
- Owner: iHeartMedia, Inc.; (iHM Licenses, LLC)
- Sister stations: WEBG, WFNN, WJET, WRKT, WRTS, WTWF

History
- First air date: 1993; 33 years ago (as WFGO)
- Former call signs: WVZB (1991–1993, CP); WFGO (1993–2007)
- Call sign meaning: W X BoB

Technical information
- Licensing authority: FCC
- Facility ID: 52144
- Class: A
- ERP: 1,700 watts
- HAAT: 187 meters (614 ft)

Links
- Public license information: Public file; LMS
- Webcast: Listen live (via iHeartRadio)
- Website: 947bobfm.iheart.com

WXBB (94.7 MHz) is a commercial FM radio station in Erie, Pennsylvania. It is branded as "94.7 Bob FM" and carries an adult hits format as of January 5, 2007. The station is owned by iHeartMedia. WXBB's studios are located in the Boston Store building in downtown Erie while its transmitter is located near Peach Street and Sesame Street south of I-90.

== History ==
The "94.7 Bob FM" branding replaced WFGO "Froggy 94.7" on January 5, 2007.

Froggy 94.7 was an oldies station, and one of the Froggy stations that neither carried country music nor used fictitious frog-themed names for its disc jockeys. Longtime Erie personality "Captain" Dan Geary was a fixture on the Froggy format.

During this tenure, WFGO was heavily involved in the community, often having giveaways and holding live remote broadcasts. One of their most notable events was a "Classic Car Cruise In," which was annually held at a local McDonald's restaurant.

The present-day WXBB call sign was previously assigned to what is now WSAK/WSHK in Hampton New Hampshire.

WXBB can also be heard in Ashtabula, Ohio, and surrounding areas.

The station airs the syndicated Valentine In The Morning from KBIG in Los Angeles via iHeartMedia's Premium Choice network.

On March 27, 2019, Connoisseur Media announced that it would transfer WXBB along with its sister stations to iHeartMedia in exchange for WFRE and WFMD in the Frederick, Maryland market from the Aloha Station Trust. The sale closed on May 20, 2019.

Although the station still uses the longtime slogan "we play anything", its playlist has been drastically shortened after being purchased by iHeartMedia. It now consists mostly of 1980s pop hits in heavy rotation, with the occasional song from other eras, bordering more on a classic hits format than had originally been intended. It also features significantly longer commercial breaks throughout each hour, most advertising national companies or other iHeart programming.
