= WFNN =

Radio station in Erie, Pennsylvania

- Erie, Pennsylvania; United States
- Broadcast area: Erie, Pennsylvania
- Frequency: 1330 kHz
- Branding: Fox Sports 1330 AM Erie

Programming
- Format: Sports
- Affiliations: Fox Sports Radio

Ownership
- Owner: iHeartMedia, Inc.; (iHM Licenses, LLC)
- Sister stations: WEBG, WJET, WRKT, WRTS, WTWF, WXBB

History
- First air date: 1947
- Former call signs: WIKK (1947–57); WICU (1957–67); WRIE (1967–89); WEYZ (1989–93); WFLP (1993–99); WFNN (1999–2007); WFGO (2007)
- Call sign meaning: W FaN N

Technical information
- Licensing authority: FCC
- Facility ID: 26611
- Class: B
- Power: 5,000 watts
- Transmitter coordinates: 41°59′32″N 80°01′44″W
- Repeater: 95.9 WEBG (Mina, New York)

Links
- Public license information: Public file; LMS
- Webcast: Listen Live
- Website: sportsradio1330.iheart.com

WFNN (1330 AM) is a sports radio station in Erie, Pennsylvania, owned by iHeartMedia. It is an affiliate of Fox Sports Radio. Its current name is Fox Sports 1330 AM Erie. WFNN's studios are located in the Boston Store building in downtown Erie while its transmitter is located near U.S. Route 19 and Sharp Rd south of Erie.

== History ==
The call letters WFNN were originally licensed to a station in Escanaba, Michigan, which first began broadcasting in 1977 under the WFNN call sign. In the late 1970s and early 1980s, WFNN was "Fun 104," an automated Top 40 station. Most programming was separate from its sister station, WDBC, with a few exceptions including simulcasts of Casey Kasem's American Top 40. In 1982, that station switched to its current calls, WYKX.

WMYJ-AM was sister to WMYJ-FM which was started by Bulmer Communications, who also owned radio stations in Ashtabula, Ohio, Dunkirk, New York, Lima, Ohio, Ottawa, Ohio and Logansport, Indiana. John Bulmer was forced to sell the Erie radio stations due to overlap in signals (during the time one could only own one AM and one FM in the same market). In 1985 he sold both stations to Erie Communications, who also owned radio stations in Sandusky, Ohio, Cleveland and Johnstown, New York.

After being sold to Erie Communications who also owned radio stations in Johnstown, Pennsylvania, Sandusky, Ohio and Cleveland, they changed to WFNN and began as a sports-talk channel known as "Sports Radio 1330, The Fan" and part of the ESPN Radio network.

WFNN became an oldies station playing syndicated music on January 8, 2007, upon losing oldies radio station, Froggy 94.7. The WFGO call letters of Froggy 94.7, formerly an oldies station, were originally moved over to 1330 when 94.7 became Bob-FM. WFGO was, at the time, the only station in the country to use the Froggy name and not be a country music station.

Former logo

Later losing rights to use the Froggy moniker, the call letters were reverted to WFNN and it uses the branding "True Oldies 1330". On September 10, 2007, the station returned to an all-sports format as "Fox Sports Radio 1330 The Fan".

This station is part of the Erie SeaWolves and the Erie Otters radio broadcasting network.

On March 27, 2019, Connoisseur Media announced that it would transfer WFNN along with its sister stations to iHeartMedia in exchange for WFRE and WFMD in the Frederick, Maryland market from the Aloha Station Trust. The sale closed on May 20, 2019.

On January 10, 2022, WEBG dropped its iHeartPodcast format and flipped to sports radio format of its sister station as a simulcast of WFNN on repeater 95.9 FM.
