= Paul Jessup (writer) =

American writer (born 1977)

- Born: Paul Matthew Jessup; August 24, 1977 (age 49); Geneva, Ohio, U.S.
- Education: Kent State University
- Occupations: Writer, game designer
- Children: 2
- Writing career
- Language: English
- Notable works: Skinless Man Counts to Five, Glass House, Daughter of the Wormwood Star, Glass Coffin Girls, Open Your Eyes
- Notable awards: Virginia Perryman Award for Excellence in Short Stories (2000)
- Website: pauljessup.com

Paul Matthew Jessup (born August 24, 1977) is an American writer of dark-fantasy and horror-fiction short stories, novels, poetry, and plays. He is also a video-game designer, and solo developer/pixel artist for Riddle Fox Games, creator of the best-selling game Bad Writer.

His short stories have had honorable mentions in several year's best anthologies, including Year's Best Horror, and the Year's best Fantasy and Horror, and Year's Best Science Fiction. His work has been translated into several different languages, with the novel Open Your Eyes being published in Polish.

In 2000, he was awarded Kent State's Virginia Perryman Award for Excellence in Freshman Short Fiction.

== Personal life ==
Paul Jessup grew up in the small town of Geneva, Ohio, and went to Kent State University, where he won the Virginia Perryman award for excellence in short fiction in 2000. He and his friend Tim Miller started Six Gallery Press around this time, publishing weird experimental novels and poetry by various writers.

In 2006 or so, he started Grendelsong fantasy and horror magazine, publishing various genre writers, including Jay Lake, Ekaterina Sedia, Richard Bowes, Samantha Henderson, Eugie Foster, and many others. Around this time he also started selling horror short stories to pro and semi-pro magazines, including Pseudopod, Postscripts, Apex Magazine, Clarkesworld, and many more. He also gained cult following for his weird and surreal books, collections and more.

Around 2020, he began creating video games as a fun side project. His most popular game (to date) was Bad Writer, which became a best seller on itch.io and the Nintendo Switch.

In 2022, his short story "Skinless Man Counts to Five" made the Stoker awards recommended reading list. In 2023, he signed a three-book deal with Underland Press for two horror novels and a short-story collection.

== Disability and multiple sclerosis ==
In 2008, Jessup had his first attack of optic neuritis, which eventually led to his diagnosis of multiple sclerosis. In 2021, he was then diagnosed with diabetes as well.

== Books ==
- Daughter of the Wormwood Star (2024, published by Underland Press)
- Skinless Man Counts to Five and Other Tales of the Macabre (2024, published by Underland Press
- Glass House (2023, published by Underland Press)
- The Silence that Binds (2021, published by Vernacular Books)
- Close Your Eyes (2018, published by Apex Books)
- Glass Coffin Girls (2009, published by PS Publishing)
- Werewolves (2010, published by Chronicle Books)
- Open Your Eyes (2009, published by Apex Books) (2013 published in Alamanach Fantastyki by Solaris, translated into Polish by Miroslaw Obarski)

== Poetry ==
- All the Houses on Sesame Street Are Haunted Houses (2013, published in Interfictions)
- That Time I Said Hello to You, And You Thought I Was a Bear (2012, published in Word Riot)
- The Basement (1997, published in Ashtabula Star Beacon)
- Red Dirt (1997, published in Ashtabula Star Beacon)

== Nonfiction ==
- So You Want to Build a Generation Ship (published in Strange Horizons)
- A Wave on the Sea (2018, published in Apex Magazine)
- Surviving Times of Stagnation (2017, published in SFWA
- Post-Novel Blues (2018, published in SFWA)
- Finding Your Tribe (2017, published in SFWA)
- Someone Changed the Bones in Our Homes (2017, published in Nightmare Magazine)
- The Rebirth of Grue (2008, published in Strange Horizons)
- Confessions of a Red Mage (2008, published in Strange Horizons)
- Standing Still, Falling Behind (2008, published in Erie Life Magazine)

== Editor ==
- Hatter Bones (2010, ENE Press)
- Grendelsong (2004–2008 (print), 2015–2016 (online))
- Coffinmounth (2010)
