= Great Lakes Life Magazine =

Defunct American monthly magazine

- Publisher: Rena Tran
- Frequency: Monthly
- Circulation: City / Regional
- First issue: April 2010
- Final issue: February 2011
- Company: Great Lakes Life Magazine, LLC
- Country: United States
- Based in: Westfield, New York
- Language: English
- OCLC: 603713519

Great Lakes Life Magazine
- Publisher: Rena Tran
- Categories: City / Regional
- Frequency: Monthly
- First issue: February 2008
- Final issue: March 2010
- Company: Erie Life Magazine, LLC
- Based in: Erie, Pennsylvania
- OCLC: 212415983

Great Lakes Life Magazine was a regional magazine that was published in Westfield, New York. It was founded by editor-in-chief and publisher Rena Tran and began publication in February 2008 under the title Erie Life Magazine, but went out of production in 2011. The magazine was available in over 750 retail locations in Pennsylvania, Ohio, western New York, eastern Michigan, and southern Ontario and circulated to over 25,000 readers.

== Erie Life Magazine ==
Erie Life Magazine's first issue was published in February 2008 and featured a cover story on Erie Philharmonic conductor Daniel Meyer. While located in the Renaissance Centre in downtown Erie, Erie Life Magazine was the only magazine in the Erie area not affiliated with either local broadcasters or the Erie Times-News.

== Great Lakes Life Magazine ==
In its first two years, Erie Life Magazine saw an unprecedented growth, increasing distribution from only 25 small, independent retail locations to over 640 big box retail points in four states and southern Ontario including Barnes & Noble, Borders, Wegmans Food Markets, Walmart, Walgreens, Country Fair, Giant Eagle Grocery Stores, Chapters, and Indigo Books and Music. Today, Great Lakes Life's readership is close to 100,000 readers. Due to the expanded readership, the publication was rebranded Great Lakes Life Magazine, starting with the April 2010 issue. The new title reflects the magazine's expanded coverage as it no longer focuses solely on Erie, but also areas surrounding Buffalo, Cleveland, Pittsburgh, and Ontario. The rebranding also included moving the publication out of Erie, Pennsylvania, to its new home in Westfield, New York, to distance itself from being directly associated with any of the cities it covers.

== Awards and recognition ==
In 2010 Great Lakes Life Magazine won two first place awards at the Ohio Excellence in Journalism Awards. Sponsored by the Press Club of Cleveland, the awards recognize Ohio's top performers in various realms of journalism. Great Lakes Life won "General Photo: Multiple Images" for the "Women Who Beat the Odds" spread from the October 2009 issue and "Best Departments or Columns" for the recurring Aging Smart section that runs in each issue. The awards were given out on June 18, 2010.

Great Lakes Life Magazine has also been the subject of several articles from magazine industry giant Folio. Cutthroat Competition: Breaking into a Monopoly detailed the struggles Great Lakes Life endured going against a local media monopoly, while City and Regionals on the Mend referenced Great Lakes Life in regards to city and regional publications thriving in a time of recession. The articles were published in print and online editions of Folio in May 2010. That June, Great Lakes Life's Publisher and Vice President were invited to speak at a workshop regarding independent publishing at the national Folio Show 2010 in New York City.
