= WXTG (AM) =

Radio station in Hampton, Virginia

- Hampton, Virginia; United States
- Broadcast area: Hampton Roads
- Frequency: 1490 kHz
- Branding: The Groove

Programming
- Format: Classic soul; urban oldies

Ownership
- Owner: Terry Suggs; (TL Broadcasting LLC)

History
- First air date: 1948 (as WVEC on 1050)
- Former call signs: WVEC (1948–1978); WWDE (1978–1981); WPEX (1981–1992); WOJY (1992–1997); WBYM (1997–2003); WLRT (2003–2007)
- Former frequencies: 1050 kHz (1948–1951)
- Call sign meaning: "The Game" (for former sports format)

Technical information
- Licensing authority: FCC
- Facility ID: 25917
- Class: C
- Power: 970 watts day and night
- Transmitter coordinates: 37°1′50.5″N 76°22′30.8″W
- Translator: 101.9 W270DA (Hampton)

Links
- Public license information: Public file; LMS
- Webcast: Listen live
- Website: thegroove1019.com

WXTG (1490 kHz "The Groove") is a commercial AM radio station licensed to Hampton, Virginia, and serving Hampton Roads, including Norfolk, Portsmouth, Newport News and Virginia Beach. WXTG is owned and operated by Terry Suggs, through licensee TL Broadcasting LLC. It carries a classic soul and urban oldies radio format.

WXTG’s transmitter power output is 970 watts, using a non-directional antenna. Programming is also heard on FM translator station 101.9 W270DA, with an effective radiated power (ERP) of 175 watts.

== History ==
=== WVEC and WWDE ===
The station signed on as WVEC in 1948. It broadcast at 1050 kHz and was owned by the Peninsula Broadcasting Company. WVEC was a daytimer, transmitting with 250 watts and required to go off the air at night. In 1953, the station launched a television station, WVEC-TV.

The station moved to full time broadcasting by switching to 1490 kHz. The station was later sold and changed its call sign to WWDE, paired with WWDE-FM. Several format changes followed over the years, from big band music to oldies. In the 1990s, the station played the "Music of Your Life" adult standards format and adopted WBYM call letters.

=== WBYM ===
In the late 1990s, the station was purchased by Hampton Radio II, Inc., co-owned with the "Anna's Pizza" restaurant chain. It changed to classic country as "Classic Hit Country 1490 The Goldmine". The station was the only one in the region to continue online streaming when all others stopped because of royalty disputes with copyrighted music.

On several occasions, the classic country format saw the station make the top 20 in the Arbitron ratings for Hampton Roads. Listeners in foreign countries could hear the station via streaming.

=== WLRT ===
WBYM became WLRT in late 2003, and flipped to a sports radio format, adding Washington Redskins and NASCAR coverage. It hosted several fundraising radiothons lasting over 72 hours to help victims of Hurricane Isabel, hosted continuously by morning disc jockey Chuck Hall. The station later switched to a hybrid talk radio, country music and sports format.

=== WXTG ===
On July 30, 2013, Red Zebra sold WXTG and sister station WXTG-FM to Williamsburg-based Davis Media, LLC for $1.2 million. Davis Media, LLC owns WTYD and WBQK. The sale to Davis Media was consummated on April 7, 2014. On August 1, 2013, sister station WXTG-FM broke from its simulcast of WXTG to simulcast new sister station WTYD. WXTG continued to carry a sports format under the branding "1490 The Game" until April 14, 2014, when WXTG switched to simulcasting WTYD.

On August 1, 2015, WXTG reverted to the classic country, talk and sports hybrid format that aired on the station prior to 2007. The station again carried "The Outlaw" branding. The syndicated "Imus in the Morning" show was carried during the morning drive time.

Davis Media, LLC began the process of selling WXTG to Speedway Media Group, owner of Langley Speedway, on August 6, 2016. Speedway Media Group began operating WXTG via a local marketing agreement (LMA) on August 1, 2015. The station continued to carry the Classic Country, Talk and Sports format launched on August 1.

The LMA with Speedway Media Group expired in January 2017, and WXTG switched to a simulcast of adult album alternative WXTG-FM, branded as "The Tide."

The station signed on a new FM translator at 101.9 on April 27, 2018, continuing the album adult alternative (AAA) format.

=== News and business ===
Logo as "All News 102"

On January 7, 2019, WXTG and WXTG-FM flipped to a hybrid news and business format, branded as "All News 102". The station had a local staff for Virginia news, coupled with syndicated business programming from Bloomberg Radio and world news from CBS News Radio and Westwood One News.

=== The Tide and The Groove ===
On June 5, 2020, WXTG changed its format from news to AAA, branded as "The Tide", simulcasting WTYD.

On March 24, 2020, Davis Media sold WXTG to Terry Suggs' TL Broadcasting for $150,000. The sale was consummated on June 25, 2020. On June 30, 2020, WXTG dropped the WTYD simulcast and flipped to classic R&B and urban oldies.

== Translator ==
In addition to the main station, WXTG is relayed by an FM translator.

| Call sign | Frequency | City of license | FID | ERP (W) | HAAT | Class | FCC info |
|---|---|---|---|---|---|---|---|
| W270DA | 101.9 FM | Hampton, Virginia | 200498 | 175 | 129 m (423 ft) | D | LMS |
