= Erie Playhouse =

Theater in Erie, Pennsylvania, United States

Coordinates: 42.1249°N 80.0831°W

- Erie Civic Theatre Association
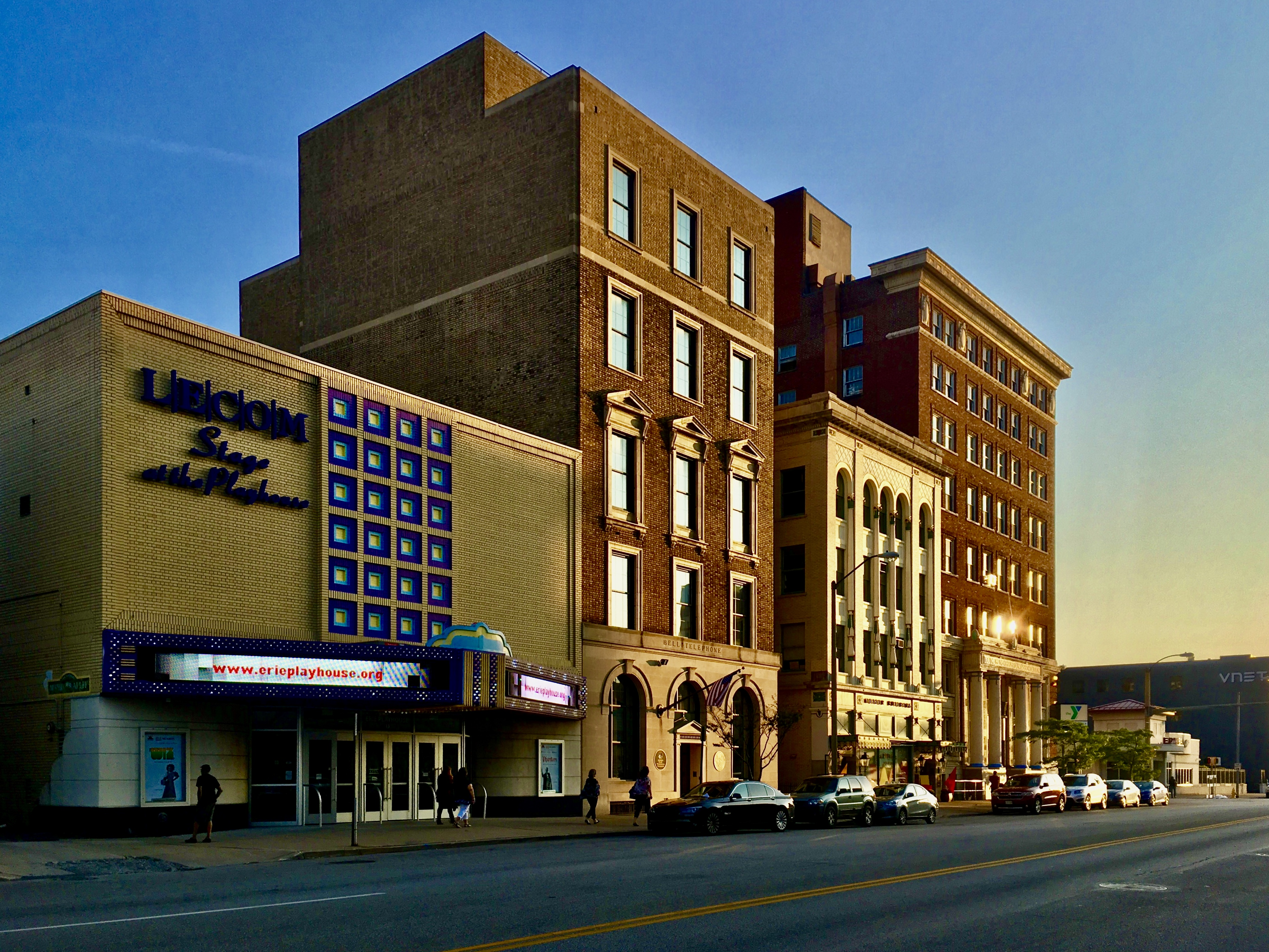
- Interactive map of Erie Playhouse
- Address: 13 West 10th Street; Erie, Pennsylvania; USA

Website
- www.erieplayhouse.org

Erie Playhouse is a historic theatre located in Erie, Pennsylvania.

== History ==
The Erie Playhouse was established as the "Peoples Theatre" by 1882, and was incorporated as the Erie Civic Theatre Association in 1916.

The troupe performed at the H.V. Claus Block building on State Street between 10th Street and 12th Street in 1882. Productions were performed from 1915 to 1919 at the Reed Hotel near North Park Row. In 1919, the theatre relocated to the Keystone Brass Foundry, where performances were held until 1927. The theatre built its own facility in 1929 on West 7th Street between Sassafras Street and Peach Street. It operated at this site, except for a three-year period during World War II, until 1965, when the site was sold to Gannon University. The company occupied the Penn Movie House in Wesleyville, Pennsylvania from 1965 to 1975, when fire regulations forced the closing of the building, at which time performances of the "Brave Little Theatre Without A Home" were held at an assortment of local venues.

In 1983, the company purchased and renovated the Strand Theatre at 13 West 10th Street in downtown Erie, which is its present home. It is a proscenium theatre with capacity for 433 patrons; renovations in 2007 reduced capacity from the original 1983 layout of 520 seats. The theatre experienced a US$1 million renovation in 1993.

The company's first production in the 1983 season was Annie. Its 1,000th performance at its current home was The Sound of Music in 2000.

== Directors ==
- Henry B. Vincent (1916–1941) died in 1941
- L. Newell Tarrant (1946–1962) died in 2000
- Bill Cohen (circa 1962–1972)
- David Matthews (1972–2006) died in 2021
- Almitra Clerkin (2006–2017)
- Kate Lechner (2017- 2023)
- Zach Flock (2023 - current)

== Awards ==
- Recognized by the American Theatre Association in 1985 as one of the Ten Best Community Theatres in the United States
- The Erie Playhouse received the 2015 Reader's Choice Award from the PA Theatre Guide as the Best Community Theatre in Pennsylvania

== Affiliated programs ==
Erie Playhouse hosts Youtheatre, an opportunity for students to learn about the stage behind the scenes, in classes, and in a long-running summer camp.

PLAYtime uses the arts as a vehicle to make a meaningful connection with the stories from Dolly Parton's Imagination Library with, in and through the use of song, drama, movement, and visual arts, stories come alive and create purposeful shared reading experiences.
