= WLVU =

WLVU may refer to:

- WLVU (FM) 97.1 MHz, a radio station in Belle Meade, Tennessee, United States
- WLVO (FM) 88.5 MHz, a radio station in Halifax, Pennsylvania, United States that previously held the WLVU callsign
- WSUN (FM) 97.1 MHz, a radio station in Holiday, Florida, United States that also previously held the WLVU callsign at 106.3 MHz
- WXKC 99.3 MHz, a radio station in Erie, Pennsylvania that held the call letters until 1985
