= WJET =

WJET may refer to:

- WJET (AM), a radio station (1400 AM) licensed to Erie, Pennsylvania, United States
- WJET-TV, a television station (channel 28, virtual channel 24) licensed to Erie, Pennsylvania, United States
