= Boston Store (Erie, Pennsylvania) =

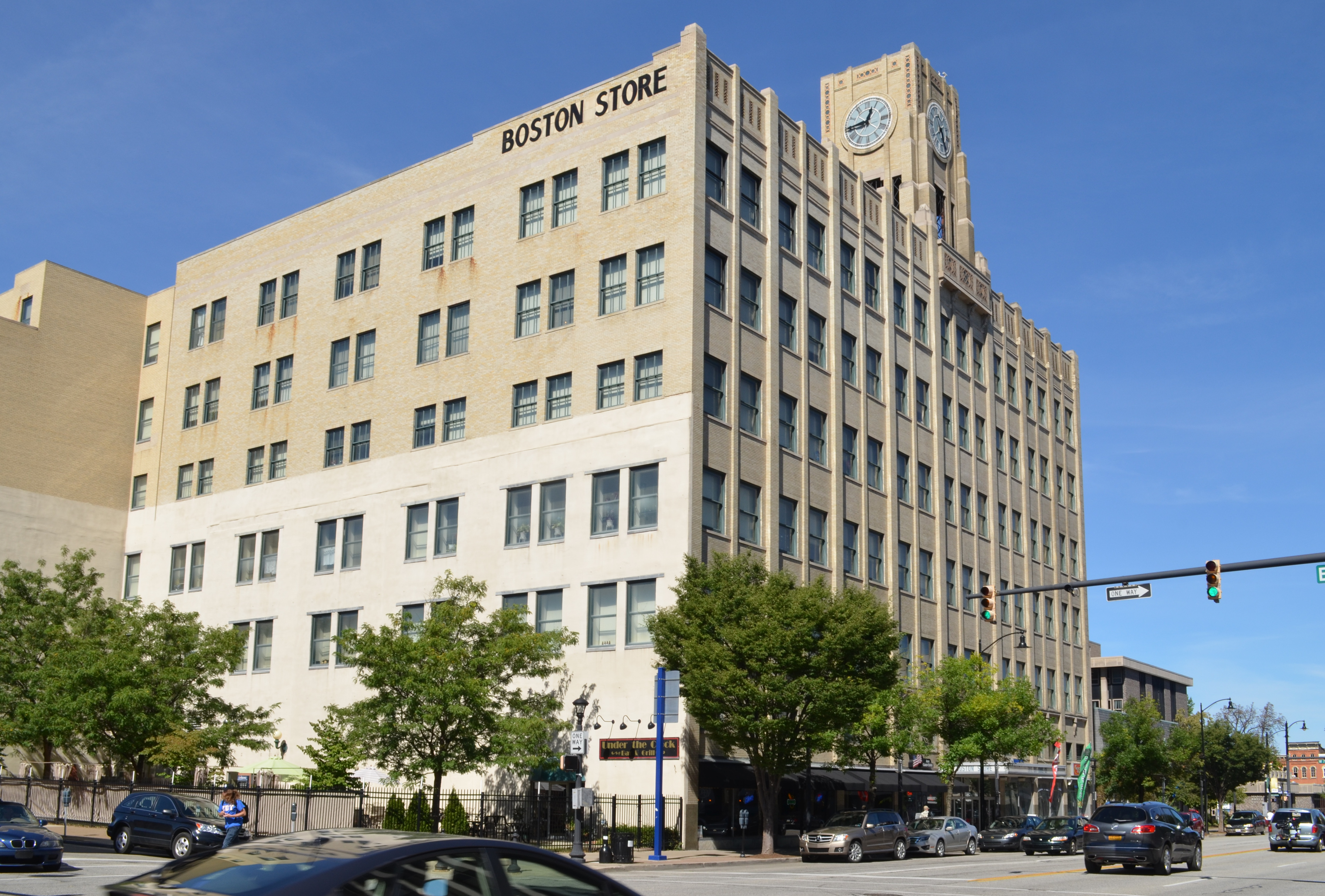
- Boston Store in September 2013

- Location within Pennsylvania

General information
- Architectural style: Art Deco
- Location: 716–728 State Street; Erie, Pennsylvania; United States
- Coordinates: 42°7′40″N 80°5′4″W
- Construction started: 1929
- Completed: 1931

Design and construction
- Architects: Shutts & Morrison, Myers & Krider

U.S. National Register of Historic Places
- Designated: October 24, 1996
- Reference no.: 96001194

The Boston Store is a former department store at 716–728 State Street in Downtown Erie, Pennsylvania, U.S. The store itself was founded in 1885, with the building being constructed in 1929. At its peak, two other Boston Stores were opened, in addition to the downtown store. The Boston Store was closed in 1979. The building remained abandoned until 1988, when it was renovated into a combination apartment and commercial building, and was renamed Boston Store Place. The Boston Store was listed on the National Register of Historic Places in 1996.

== Design ==
The Boston Store is located between 7th and 8th Streets on State Street in downtown Erie. The six-story tall, buff brick building is predominantly cubical with a frontage of 145 feet (44 m) along State Street. The facade is divided into eight bays by brick piers.; the bays are further subdivided by secondary piers. The top of the building is capped with parapet, with piers extending above it and topped with stone coping. Vertical panels containing blue and tan terracotta are inset in the parapets of each bay. The bay containing the main entrance is off-centered and wider than the others; instead of a parapet, it is capped with a balcony-like structure inlaid with terracotta.

The "signature exterior feature of the Boston Store" is the four sided, 40-foot (10 m) bell and clock tower situated over the main entrance. It is supported by four tiers of buttresses, each decreasing in size and capped with beveled limestone. The design of the clock tower "recalls religious, civic, and collegiate themes, and became an instant landmark on the Erie skyline." Each of the four clock faces are 12 feet (4 m) in diameter and have "black metal Roman numerals [on] a background of white translucent glass panels". Terra-cotta circles are inlaid across the top of the tower and "above the last step of the buttresses". The lower section of the tower houses the bell behind a geometric tracery.

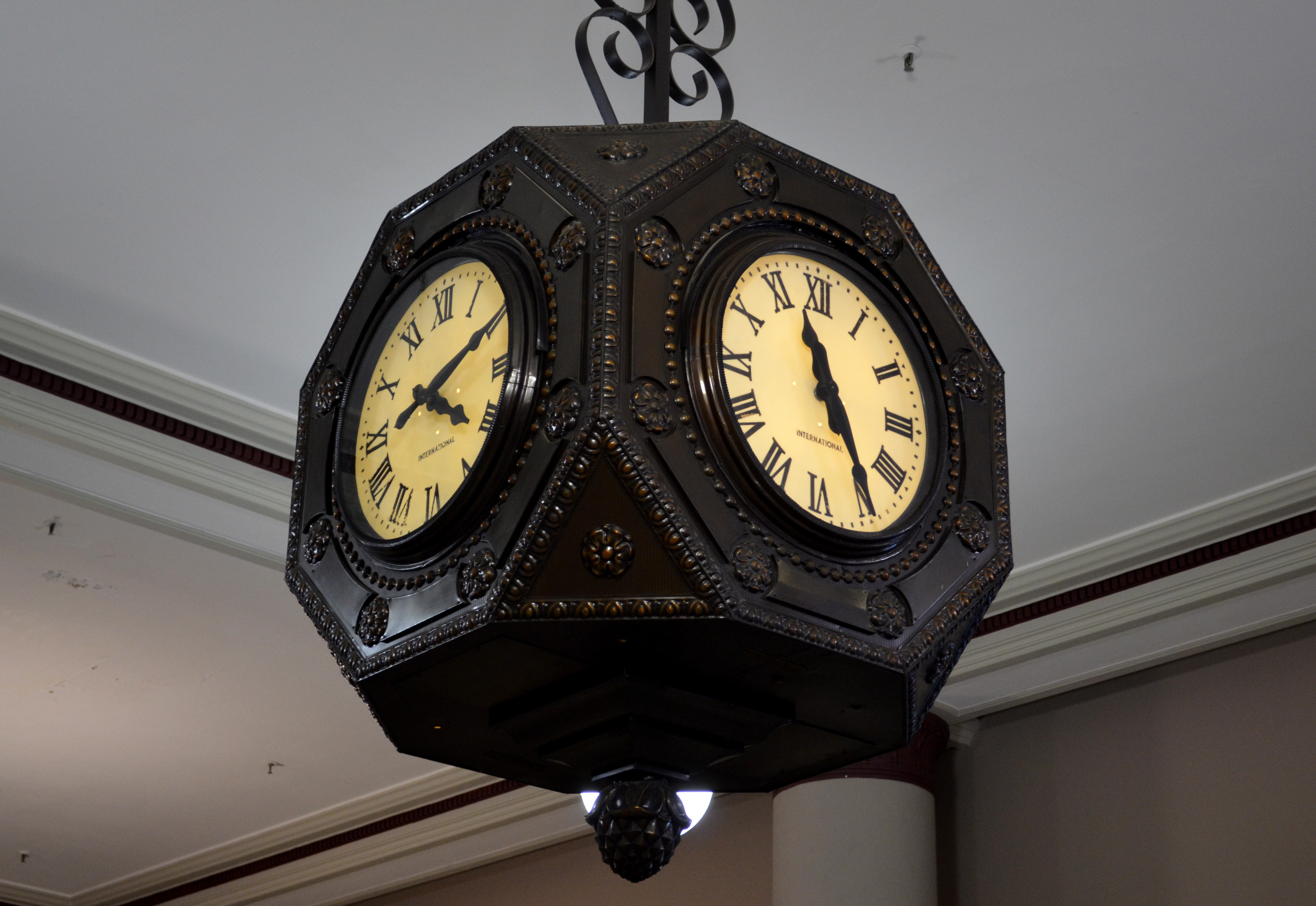
Clock inside the Boston Store

A hallway running from State Street to Peach Street entrances bisects the Boston Store. A cube-shaped, four-sided clock built by International Business Machines hangs in the hallway.

Lettering on the marquees denote the building as the boston store and erie dry goods co. For a short time in early 2011, the signs were replaced with ones for University of Pittsburgh Medical Center, before public sentiment forced the switch back. Additions made to the building provided entrances on Peach and 8th Streets. The store did have an annex with an entrance on 7th Street, but that has since been demolished.

== History ==
Boston Store
- Industry: Retail
- Genre: Department store
- Predecessor: Erie Dry Goods Company
- Founded: 1885
- Founder: Elisha H. Mack
- Defunct: July 7, 1979
- Fate: Dissolved
- Headquarters: Erie, Pennsylvania; United States
- Parent: Associated Dry Goods (1959–1979)

The Boston Store was founded in 1885 when Elisha H. Mack bought the bankrupt Erie Dry Goods Store. Mack renamed the store after Boston, Massachusetts, then the "perceived...center of fashion and culture." The store was moved from its original location on Peach Street to the 700-block of State Street in 1886. From 1886 to 1930, the Boston Store expanded, purchasing more of the property on its block. By the late 1920s, the store had managed to acquire frontage on all four surrounding streets—Peach, State, 7th and 8th. Mack retired in 1925, shortly after his longtime business partner died.

In 1929, a new Boston Store was designed by the Erie-architectural firm Shutts & Morrison. The new store was completed in 1931 and was estimated to have cost $2 million (~$33.1 million in 2024). From 1949 to 1953, renovations and expansion of the Boston Store were carried out by the local architectural firm Myers & Krider. The three-story portion of the Boston Store facing Peach Street was raised to six in 1949; the three-story structure on 8th Street was demolished and replaced with a five-story one the next year. Escalators were installed on the first through fifth floors in 1953.

The Boston Store was bought by Associated Dry Goods in 1959. Management of the Boston Store was assumed by Horne's department store of Pittsburgh in December 1975. Because of the loss of sales caused by competition from the Millcreek Mall in nearby Millcreek Township, the Boston Store was closed on July 7, 1979.

=== Current use ===
The Boston Store was listed on the National Register of Historic Places on October 24, 1996. The upper five floors were renovated into 125 apartments. The iHeartMedia radio stations 1330 WFNN, 1400 WJET, 104.9 WRKT, 94.7 WXBB, 93.9 WTWF, and 103.7 WRTS broadcast from the building, and the minimal local operations of 95.9 WEBG, based across the border in Mina, New York, are also housed there. A restaurant was opened on September 22, 2008 on the ground floor of the Boston Store, but closed in December 2013. UPMC Health Plan moved into a 7,600-square-foot (700 m^{2}) space on the first floor in early 2011. On September 17, 2016, Voodoo Brewery opened a casual pub and eatery on the ground floor.

== See also ==
- List of defunct department stores of the United States
- National Register of Historic Places listings in Erie County, Pennsylvania

== Sources ==
- Kinal, Brian (February 7, 1999). "Hope on Horizon for Boston Store". Erie Daily Times. pp. 1B, 10B.
- Uhl, Charles H. (May 8, 1996). National Register of Historic Places Registration: Pennsylvania SP Boston Store. National Archives and Records Administration. (Downloading may be slow.)
