= ESPN Radio 1260 =

ESPN Radio 1260 may refer to:

- WRIE serving the Erie, PA market
- WSKO (AM) serving the Syracuse, NY market
