= WQHZ =

Radio station in Erie, Pennsylvania

Coordinates: 42.040°N 80.069°W

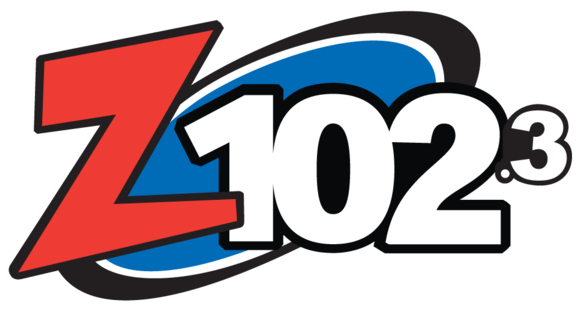
- Erie, Pennsylvania; United States
- Broadcast area: Erie, Pennsylvania
- Frequency: 102.3 MHz
- Branding: Z102.3

Programming
- Format: Classic rock
- Affiliations: Westwood One

Ownership
- Owner: Cumulus Media; (Radio License Holding CBC, LLC)
- Sister stations: WRIE, WXTA, WXKC

History
- First air date: 1971 (as WMDI-FM)
- Former call signs: WMDI-FM (1971–1980); WSEG (1980–1986); WJET-FM (1986–2001); WLKK (6/2001-10/2001)

Technical information
- Licensing authority: FCC
- Facility ID: 65748
- Class: A
- ERP: 1,700 watts
- HAAT: 187 meters (614 ft)

Links
- Public license information: Public file; LMS
- Webcast: Listen live
- Website: z1023online.com

WQHZ (102.3 FM) is classic rock formatted broadcast radio station in Erie, Pennsylvania owned by Cumulus Media. WQHZ's studios were located at 471 Robison Road in Summit Township while its transmitter is located at Peach St and Sesame Street in Summit Township, Pennsylvania

Notable weekday programming includes "The Bob and Tom Show" in mornings, Mike Sheffield in middays, and "Steve Gorman Rocks" at night.

== History of the 102.3 frequency ==
Several stations and formats have called 102.3 FM home in Erie over the years. In the 1970s, progressive rock ruled the airwaves and 102.3 was known as WMDI-FM until 1980. Former WJET DJ Ron Seggi (Ronnie Gee) bought the station and HitRadio Red Hot FM 102 WSEG was born. They played a mix of adult contemporary and current and classic rock.

WSEG remained on the air until 1986, when longtime Erie AM radio station WJET took over the station. The first song played under the "Jet-FM 102" moniker was Bruce Springsteen's "Born in the USA", which was played back on a cart machine plugged directly in the transmitter while the crossover of lines from the two stations took place. At the time, the station's transmitter was on one of WQLN's towers. JET-FM 102, as they were known for several years, changed formats a few times throughout the years. Formats ranged from Top 40/CHR to adult contemporary to album rock and back to Top 40/CHR. During the Top 40 years, WJET-FM, which was slightly rebranded as "JET-102" for a time, competed against WRTS.

On April 1, 1999, the station became 102.3 The Point, playing alternative rock. In 2001, Regent Communications bought the station. On October 23, at 1:02 p.m., WQHZ ("Z102") was born playing "Erie'z Clazzic Hitz." The first song played under the new format was "Start Me Up" by The Rolling Stones. In 2002, WQHZ shifted to classic rock and rebranded as "Z102.3." WQHZ's main competitor is WRKT.
