= WRKT =

Radio station in Erie, Pennsylvania

Coordinates: 42.08985°N 79.94269°W

- North East, Pennsylvania; United States
- Broadcast area: Erie, Pennsylvania
- Frequency: 104.9 MHz
- Branding: Rocket 105

Programming
- Format: Active rock

Ownership
- Owner: iHeartMedia, Inc.; (iHM Licenses, LLC)
- Sister stations: WFNN, WJET, WRTS, WEBG, WTWF, WXBB

History
- First air date: March 29, 1970; 56 years ago
- Former call signs: WHYP-FM (1970–1989)
- Former frequencies: 100.9 MHz (1970–2017)
- Call sign meaning: "W"e're "Roc"K"e"T"!

Technical information
- Licensing authority: FCC
- Facility ID: 55063
- Class: B1
- ERP: 4,500 watts
- HAAT: 160.5 meters (527 ft)

Links
- Public license information: Public file; LMS
- Webcast: Listen live
- Website: rocketerie.iheart.com

WRKT (104.9 FM, "Rocket 105") is an active rock radio station in Erie, Pennsylvania. The station is owned by iHeartMedia. WRKT's studios are located in the Boston Store building in downtown Erie while its transmitter is located near NE Sherman Road and Miller Road in Chautauqua County, New York. It plays both old, new, and next rock songs plus an array of sports.

== History ==
The station signed on in 1970 as WHYP-FM. Owned by James D. Brownyard, it was a simulcast of then sister station WHYP (now WZTE) 1530's Country Music format. WHYP and WHYP-FM were sold to Rambaldo Communications in 1989. On June 22, 1989, at 12:00 p.m., WHYP-FM became WRKT as Rocket 101 at 100.9 MHz, for 28 years before moving up the dial to 104.9 MHz and rebranding as Rocket 105 at 12:00 p.m. on October 20, 2017. The final song as "Rocket 101" was "Free Bird" by Lynyrd Skynyrd, while the first song as "Rocket 105" was "For Those About to Rock (We Salute You)" by AC/DC. The 100.9 frequency was to be reallocated to Westfield, New York, and sold at auction. Rick Rambaldo, owner of WEHP, won the bid, but was late in getting his down payment sent to the FCC, leading to rejection of his bid. The frequency again went up for auction in April 2020 (later delayed to July 2021). Rambaldo held an agreement to restore the oldies format that had previously been on WZTE until 2017 had he won the auction. Rambaldo sold WEHP in 2019, but re-entered the 2021 auction, winning the bidding for the 100.9 license. In 2022, Family Life Network claimed that it had acquired the frequency and relocated the 100.9 MHz allocation back to North East as WCGE.

On March 27, 2019, Connoisseur Media announced that it would transfer WRKT, along with its sister stations in Erie, to iHeartMedia in exchange for WFRE and WFMD in the Frederick, Maryland, market from the Aloha Station Trust. The sale closed on May 20, 2019. Since the iHeartMedia ownership, the only remaining local air personalities on the station were the late Mojo McKay and Allan Carpenter. Although Mojo McKay would be later let go as part of the nationwide iHeartMedia layoffs in August 2024 and would be replaced by Rover's Morning Glory show. The remainder of Rocket 105's programming originates from the iHeartMedia Premium Choice lineup.

Notable past and present on-air personalities include Kris Earl Phillips, the original Program Director and architect of the "Rocket" format, Steve Bohen, Paul Spinley, Kevin August, Dave Sharp, Amy St. John, Ronnie "Ron Klinester" Kline, Buckethead (Randy Bauman now at Pittsburgh's WDVE), Mark O'Brien, Nat Massing, Mojo McKay, Allan "AC" Carpenter, Sammy Stone, Greg Mauz, Jeremy "Moose" Pierce, Woody, with Chris Rodler, and "Static 'Stat' Boy".
