= WWHV =

WWHV may refer to:

- WGSX, a radio station (104.3 FM) licensed to Lynn Haven, Florida, which held the call sign WWHV from 2007 to 2011
- WXTG-FM, a radio station (102.1 FM) licensed to Virginia Beach, Virginia, which held the call sign WWHV from 2001 to 2007
