= Paul Jessup =

Paul Jessup may refer to:

- Paul Jessup (athlete) (1908–1992), American discus thrower and shot putter
- Paul Jessup (writer) (born 1977), American writer
