= WERI =

Weri or WERI may refer to:

- Weri language, a language of Papua New Guinea
- WERI (FM), a radio station (102.7 FM) licensed to serve Wattsburg, Pennsylvania, United States
