= Tim Miller =

Timothy or Tim Miller may refer to:

- Thomas I. Miller, known as Tim, president of Murray State University
- Tim Miller (director) (born 1964), American film director, VFX artist and co-founder of Blur Studio
- Tim Miller (ice hockey) (born 1987), American ice hockey player
- Tim Miller (performance artist) (born 1958), American performance artist and writer
- Tim Miller (poet) (born 1979), American poet and novelist
- Tim Miller (politician) (born 1965), American politician and member of the Minnesota House of Representatives
- Tim Miller (political strategist) (born 1981), American campaign consultant and critic of Donald Trump
- Tim Miller (yoga teacher) (born 1951), director of the Ashtanga Yoga Center in Carlsbad, CA.
- Timothy Miller (born 1944), American professor of religious studies at the University of Kansas
- Timothy Miller, founder and project lead of the Open Graphics Project

== See also ==
- Tim Millar, Canadian musician
