= Henry Vincent (disambiguation) =

Henry Vincent (10 May 1813 – 29 December 1878) was an English religious leader.

Henry Vincent may also refer to:

- Henry Vincent (MP for St Mawes) (circa 1593), English member of Parliament
- Sir Henry Vincent, 6th Baronet (c. 1685–1757), British politician
- Henry Vincent (gaoler) (c. 1796–1869), Australian prison superintendent
- Henry B. Vincent (1872–1941), American composer and organist
- Henry Vincent (artist) (born 1966), American artist
