= WRIE =

Radio station in Erie, Pennsylvania

Simulcasting WXKC, Erie, PA
- Erie, Pennsylvania; United States
- Frequency: 1260 kHz
- Branding: Classy 100

Programming
- Format: Adult contemporary

Ownership
- Owner: Cumulus Media; (Radio License Holding CBC, LLC)
- Sister stations: WQHZ; WXTA; WXKC

History
- First air date: June 11, 1941
- Former call signs: WERC (1941–1961); WWYN (1961–1977); WLKK (1977–1987); WHDZ (1987–1989)
- Call sign meaning: "Erie"

Technical information
- Licensing authority: FCC
- Facility ID: 32982
- Class: B
- Power: 5,000 watts
- Transmitter coordinates: 42°3′18.2″N 80°2′23.2″W

Links
- Public license information: Public file; LMS

WRIE 1260 AM, was a commercial radio station licensed to Erie, Pennsylvania, United States. Owned by Cumulus Media, it carried an adult contemporary format as a simulcast of co-owned WXKC. WRIE's studios and transmitter site are located at 471 Robison Road in Erie.

The station began broadcasting as WERC in 1941. It was locally owned by the Presque Isle Broadcasting Company and aired national radio programming from CBS and later NBC in the 1940s; it moved from 1490 to 1230 kHz in 1945 and then again to 1260 kHz in 1949. The station changed call signs to WWYN in 1961 and WLKK in 1977, the latter accompanying a switch to a country music format. WLKK flipped to beautiful music in 1986 and oldies in 1987, briefly adopting the WHDZ call sign before changing to WRIE in 1989.

After airing Music of Your Life adult standards programming through the 1990s and early- to mid-2000s, the station switched to sports radio in 2007, initially as an ESPN Radio affiliate before changing to CBS Sports Radio (later renamed Infinity) at the start of 2013. WRIE also carried games from the Pittsburgh Penguins, the Cleveland Browns, and the Cleveland Guardians and was supplemented with a low-power FM translator. Cumulus Media took WRIE dark in mid-March 2025 as part of a larger effort in the company to suspend underperforming radio stations in their portfolio, but resumed broadcasting one year later for a month (mid March to mid April of 2026) before signing off again.

== History ==
=== WERC ===
In 1938, the Presque Isle Broadcasting Company was formed and filed for a construction permit to build a new radio station on 1500 kHz in Erie. The proposed station received objections from Erie's existing station, WLEU, and Pittsburgh's WWSW, then also at 1500 kHz. When the Federal Communications Commission (FCC) recommended in January 1940 that Presque Isle be granted the permit, WLEU announced its plans to object, but the FCC reaffirmed its award on March 13.

Presque Isle established studios in a former dance hall at 121 W. 10th Street in Erie, which would be topped by the station's transmitting antenna. During construction, the permit was adjusted to a new frequency of 1490 kHz due to NARBA, and a change in equipment manufacturer from RCA to Western Electric also pushed back completion.

WERC began broadcasting June 11, 1941, as Erie's CBS radio outlet; it moved to 1230 kHz in 1945, the same year that it switched from CBS to NBC, and 1260 kHz in 1949, the latter move allowing it to increase power to the present 5,000 watts. In 1946, plans were made to extend WERC to the then-new FM band, which materialized the next year with the launch of WERC-FM 99.9.

=== WWYN, WLKK, and WHDZ ===
WERC was purchased by Cleveland Broadcasters, Inc., owners of Cleveland station WERE, in 1959. After a second sale to WERC, Inc., in September 1961, the station was relaunched with a new call sign, WWYN, and an oldies sound featuring music from the big band era. In 1977, the station changed its call sign to WLKK and adopted a country music format.

Don Kelly, the former program director who had flipped WLKK to country, led a group that acquired WLKK and WLVU in 1985. Kelly's purchase came after Bride Broadcasting had been approved as the buyer the year before, only to withdraw from the sale and be sued. Kelly compared his task with the two stations to that of Lee Iacocca, who was known for turning around Chrysler as its CEO; both stations needed help, particularly the foundering WLVU whose attempts to modernize its previous beautiful music format were not meeting with ratings success. WLKK flipped from country to beautiful music on March 6, 1986; this followed WLVU's successful relaunch as "Classy 100" WXKC.

WLKK adopted a satellite-delivered oldies format on September 29, 1987, known as Pure Gold. The call letters were soon changed to WHDZ (for "Happy Days"), though the station found itself branding primarily as "AM 1260" because the WLKK call letters were reclaimed at 1400 AM, which had also adopted the discarded country music format and "Lake Country" imaging.

=== WRIE ===
With no change in format, WHDZ changed its call sign to WRIE in 1989. The move owed itself to changes elsewhere on Erie's AM dial. WEYZ, which had been at 1450 kHz, bought the station at 1330 kHz—which had been WRIE—and moved its call letters and programming to the lower frequency. Kelly, in turn, snapped up the newly available WRIE call sign.

Media One Group purchased WXKC–WRIE in 1996 from Atmor Properties, a subsidiary of AT&T Financial Services that had been running the stations for nearly two years. Media One was part of the local radio market's rapid consolidation in the late 1990s; it acquired country music station WXTA and hoped to merge with Rambaldo Communications to form a five-station cluster. However, that deal fell apart after the United States Department of Justice ordered the divestiture of an FM station in the process, and Media One instead sold its properties to Regent Communications in 1999. In 2004, Regent traded its Erie stations and two others in Lancaster to Citadel Broadcasting in exchange for that company's holdings in Bloomington, Illinois.

Previous logo

WRIE dropped its Music of Your Life format of adult standards for ESPN Radio in January 2007 after the previous local affiliate, WFNN, changed formats. In January 2013, as part of a national move by Cumulus (which had acquired Citadel in 2011), WRIE switched to CBS Sports Radio programming. CBS Sports Radio was rebranded Infinity Sports Radio in April 2024.

As part of a culling of underperforming radio stations by Cumulus, WRIE suspended operations in mid-March 2025 and was taken dark. W242CU (96.3 FM), a low-power translator licensed to Erie that relayed WRIE's programming at closure, was converted to rebroadcast WXTA, though that station was not broadcasting in HD Radio at the time. While Cumulus opted to surrender several of these suspended licenses after a mandatory one-year deadline, it reactivated WRIE's transmitter in early March 2026, simulcasting WXKC's adult contemporary format.
