= Warner Theatre (Erie, Pennsylvania) =

Theater in Erie, Pennsylvania

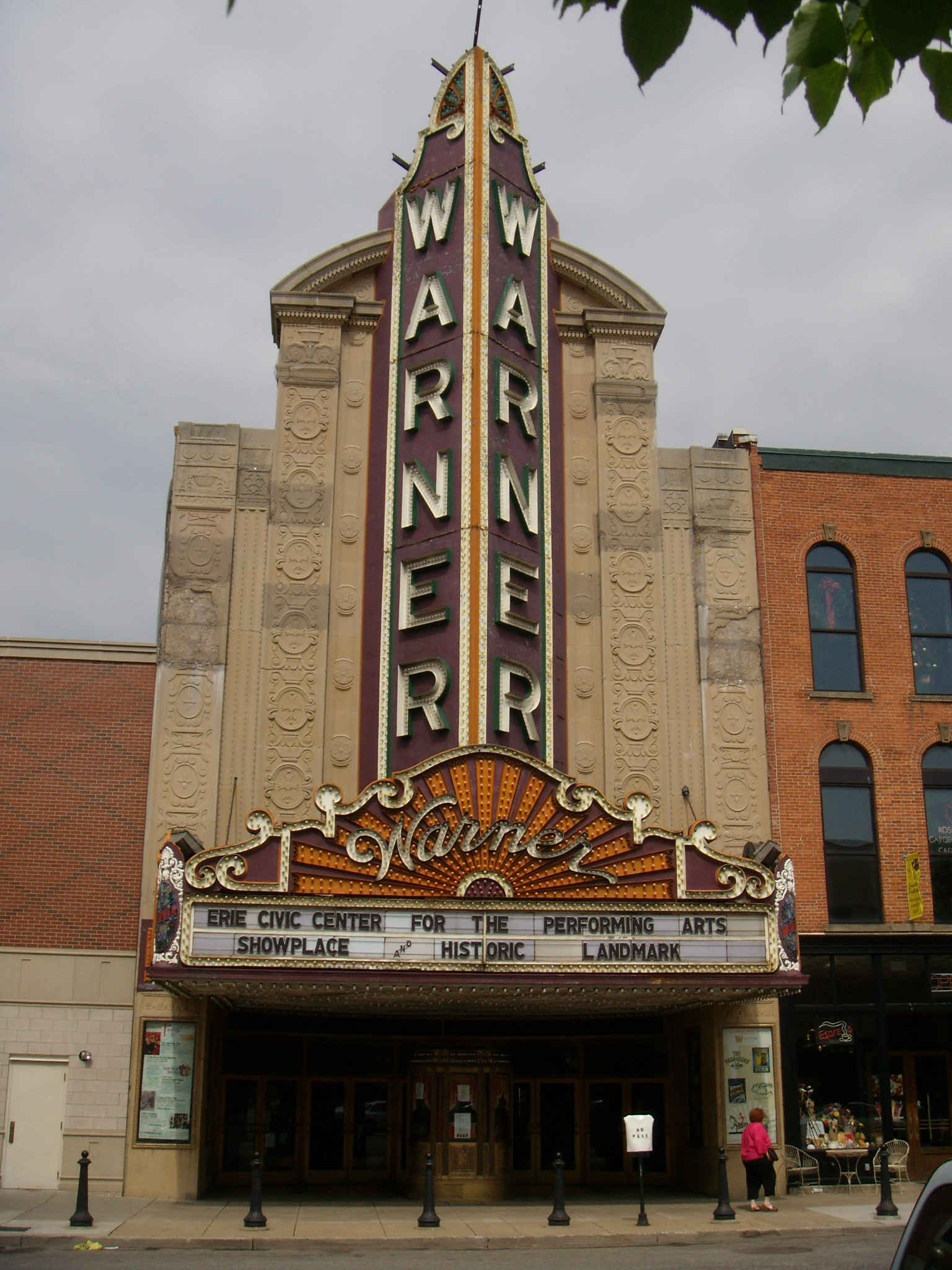
- Front entrance of the Warner Theatre
- Interactive map of Warner Theatre
- Address: 811 State Street; Erie, Pennsylvania; United States
- Owner: Erie County Convention; Center Authority
- Capacity: 2,250
- Type: Movie palace

Construction
- Opened: April 10, 1931
- Warner Theatre
- U.S. National Register of Historic Places
- Coordinates: 42°7′38″N 80°5′0″W
- Built: 1930
- Architectural style: Art Deco, French Renaissance
- NRHP reference No.: 82003787
- Added to NRHP: April 13, 1982
- Architect: Rapp and Rapp

The Warner Theatre is an Art Deco and French Renaissance-styled theater located in downtown Erie, Pennsylvania in the United States. It was listed on the National Register of Historic Places in 1982. The Warner was designed by Chicago-architects Rapp and Rapp and was opened in 1931. It was used as a movie theater until 1976, when it was sold to the City of Erie. In the early 1980s, Erie converted the theater to a performing arts center, which has become the focus of a downtown revival.

The theater features a 65-foot-by-28-foot proscenium stage and is complemented by crushed velour, gold and silver leaf, and gold-backed French mirrors. Today it hosts concerts and Broadway theatre performances and is home to the Erie Philharmonic and the Lake Erie Ballet. The Warner's Grand Lobby has capacity for up to 500 persons for a reception.

== History ==
The Warner Theatre was commissioned to be built by Warner Bros. in 1929. It opened on April 10, 1931 with the showing of the film The Millionaire.

=== Restoration Project ===
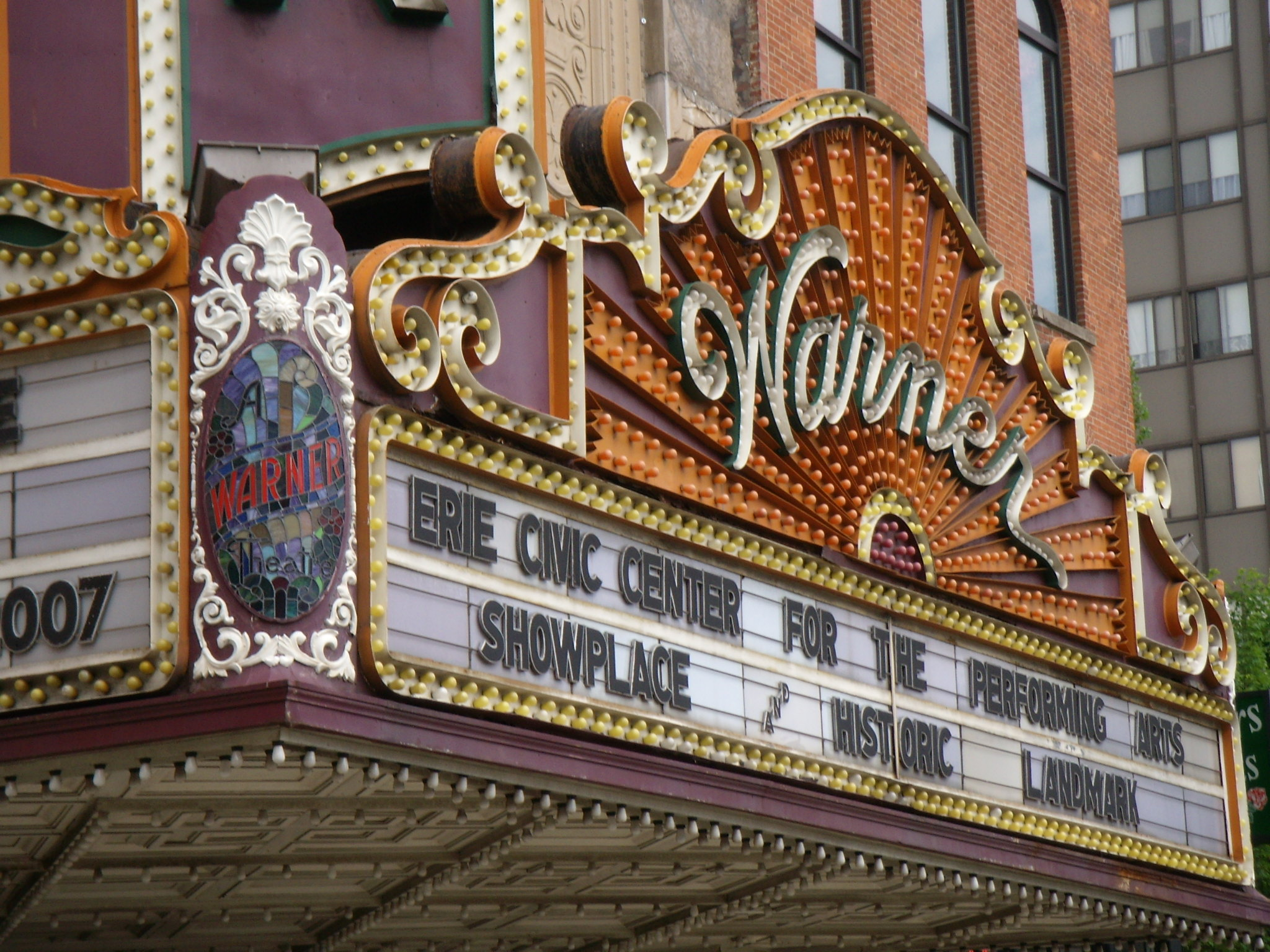
Closeup of the marquee of the Warner Theatre

In 1992, the Warner Theatre became the highest priority of the local Metro Cultural Planning Committee, an arm of the Erie Area Fund for the Arts. The committee received a grant from Erie County in 1993 to develop a Master Plan, at which point members began to seek support from state legislators. The Commonwealth of Pennsylvania appropriated $7 million for the Warner Theatre project in 1994 and released the funds in December 1997. The Warner Theatre Preservation Trust was formed in 1994 with the goal of raising $3.3 million, which it reached in January 1998. Daniel P. Coffey and Associates, LTD of Chicago, Illinois and Crowner/King of Erie were selected to head the renovation project in September 1998. Pennsylvania appropriated another $2 million in 1999 while another $1.2 million was raised by the Trust. An additional $11 million was released by Pennsylvania in April 2007, bringing the total funding for the renovation project to $23 million.

The project was delayed from 1999 to 2001 while land was acquired at the corner of 9th Street and French Street. Phase I (new roof, interior restoration, repair of outside facade) was completed in 2002. Phase II (new seating) was completed in 2003. Phase III (expansion and integration with building at 8th Street and French Street) was due to be completed in March 2007. Phase IV (new entrance, box office, concessions, restrooms) can begin now that the $11 million has been received from the Commonwealth.

== Organ ==
The Warner theater was originally equipped with a 3 manual 17 rank Wurlitzer pipe organ. This organ was moved to the Grays Armory in Cleveland, Ohio in 1970.

In May 2022 installation began on a new Wurlitzer, combining ranks from a three-manual, 21-rank organ donated by Dennis and Margaret Unks, with ranks from the old Shea's Theater organ, which was purchased by Robert "Joe" Luckey, after the original theatre was scheduled for demolition in the 1960s. The Installation was finished later that year.

== See also ==
- List of concert halls
- National Register of Historic Places listings in Erie County, Pennsylvania
