= WJET (AM) =

News/talk radio station in Erie, Pennsylvania

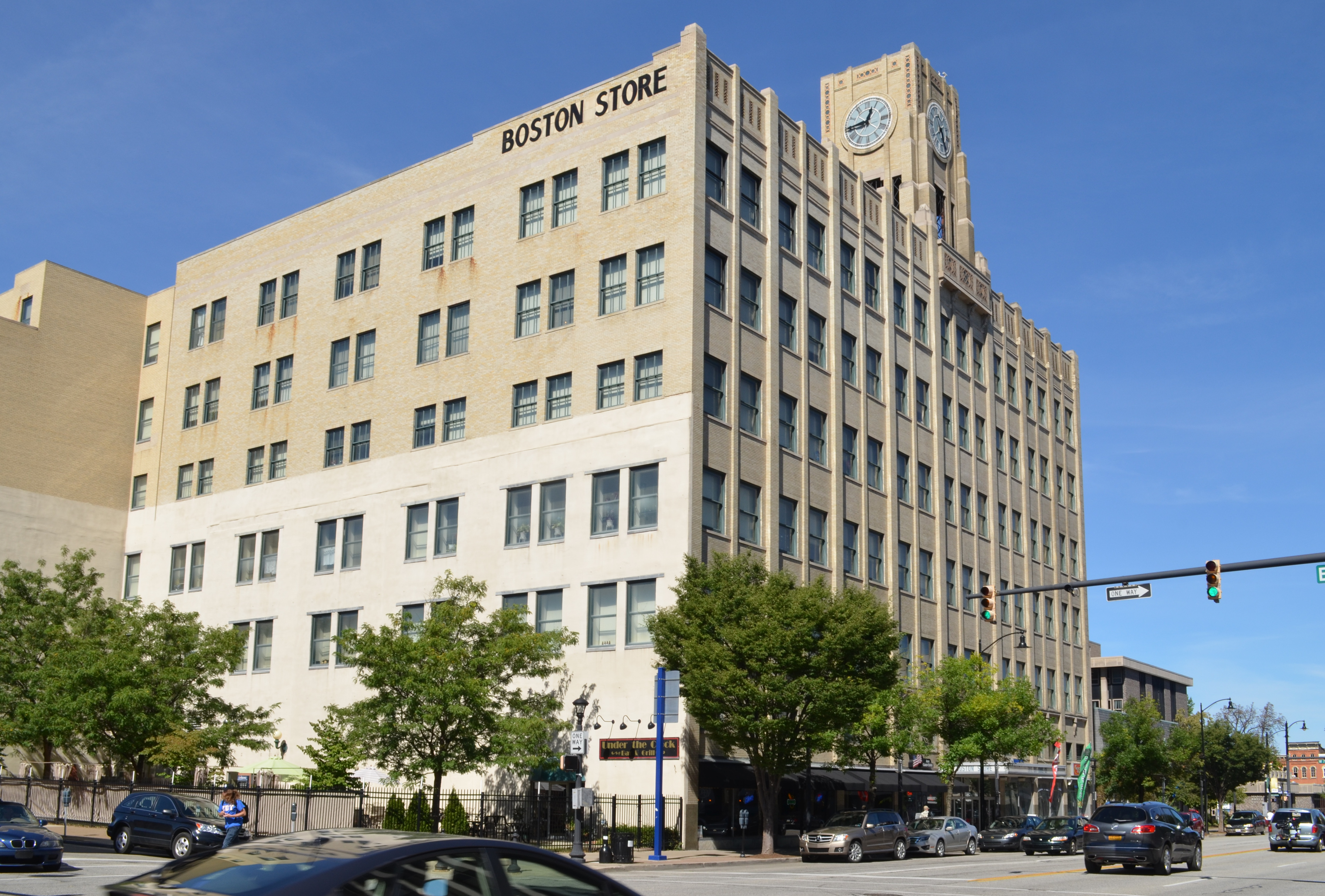
- WJET's studios, located at the Boston Store
- Erie, Pennsylvania; United States
- Frequency: 1400 kHz
- Branding: Jet Radio 1400

Programming
- Format: Conservative talk
- Affiliations: Fox News Radio

Ownership
- Owner: iHeartMedia, Inc.; (iHM Licenses, LLC)
- Sister stations: WEBG; WFNN; WRKT; WRTS; WTWF; WXBB

History
- First air date: 1951
- Former call signs: WJET (1951–1986); WBLQ (1986–1988); WLKK (1988–2001)
- Call sign meaning: "Jet" (airplane)

Technical information
- Licensing authority: FCC
- Facility ID: 33769
- Class: C
- Power: 1,000 watts (unlimited)
- Transmitter coordinates: 42°7′28.2″N 80°03′53.2″W
- Translator: 96.7 W244DX (Erie)

Links
- Public license information: Public file; LMS
- Webcast: Listen live (via iHeartRadio)
- Website: jetradio1400.iheart.com

WJET (1400 AM, "Jet Radio 1400") is a commercial radio station licensed to Erie, Pennsylvania, United States. Owned by iHeartMedia, it carries a conservative talk format with a lineup of nationally-syndicated programs. WJET's studios are located in the Boston Store building in downtown Erie.

WJET's transmitter is sited at the intersection of East 18th Street and Ash Street in the city of Erie. Programming is also heard on 250-watt FM translator W244DX at 96.7 MHz.

== History ==
WJET signed on the air in 1951. It operated on a frequency previously occupied by WRAK, which by then had been reallocated to Williamsport. It was powered at only 250 watts and its studios were at 1635 Ash Street, where WJET's transmitter is located to this day. For much of its early history, the station was owned by WJET, Inc., a subsidiary of Myron Jones Stations.

During the 1960s and 1970s, WJET had a Top 40 format, playing the big hits of the day. But by the 1980s, most music listening had shifted from AM to FM stations, despite 1400 going into AM Stereo mode. In 1986, WJET Broadcasting bought WSEG-FM at 102.3 MHz, and shifted its Top 40 format to that station, giving it the WJET call sign. AM 1400 had various formats, first as WBLQ with Urban Contemporary for about a year. Later flipping to Country as WLKK before going to talk after WXTA Country 98 signed on with Country on FM. WLKK carried programming from NBC Talknet and the Mutual Broadcasting System.

Connoisseur Media later bought WJET and WLKK. In 2001, the WJET call letters returned to AM 1400. FM 102.3 is now WQHZ, owned by Cumulus Media. The Rush Limbaugh Show was dropped in December 2008 after Premiere Networks demanded higher fees from WJET's owner to carry Limbaugh.

On March 27, 2019, Connoisseur Media announced that it would transfer WJET and its other Erie stations to iHeartMedia in exchange for WFRE and WFMD in the Frederick, Maryland, radio market. WFRE and WFMD were part of the Aloha Station Trust. The sale closed on May 20, 2019; after the close, Limbaugh was restored to WJET's lineup.

In August 2021, the Erie Otters hockey team announced a radio partnership with WJET, beginning with the 2021-2022 OHL season.

== FM translator ==
Call sign	Frequency	City of license	FID	ERP (W)	HAAT	Class	Transmitter coordinates	FCC info
W244DX	96.7 FM	Erie, Pennsylvania	201344	250	15 m (49 ft)	D	42°7′28.2″N 80°3′53.2″W	LMS
