= WWCB =

Radio station in Corry, Pennsylvania

Simulcasts WMCE-FM Erie
- Corry, Pennsylvania; United States
- Broadcast area: Corry, Pennsylvania; Union City, Pennsylvania; Erie County, Pennsylvania
- Frequency: 1370 kHz
- Branding: LECOM Radio

Programming
- Format: Classic hits

Ownership
- Owner: Lake Erie College of Osteopathic Medicine, Inc.
- Sister stations: WERI, WMCE-FM

History
- First air date: April 2, 1955 (as WOTR)
- Former call signs: WOTR (1955–1972); WWCB (1972–2010); WHYP (2010–2013)

Technical information
- Licensing authority: FCC
- Facility ID: 13967
- Class: D
- Power: 1,000 watts day; 14 watts night
- Transmitter coordinates: 41°56′10.0″N 79°39′20.0″W
- Translator: 94.1 W231DW (Corry)

Links
- Public license information: Public file; LMS
- Webcast: Listen Live
- Website: wmce.lecomradio.com

WWCB (1370 AM) is a full-service radio station licensed to Corry, Pennsylvania and serving Corry, Union City, Erie County, Pennsylvania, and Clymer, New York, from its studio located at 122 North Center Street (PA 426) in downtown Corry and a transmitter facility off of West Columbus Avenue (U.S. Route 6). It is a licensed Class D AM station operating 24 hours a day/7 days a week with 1,000 watts during the daytime, and 14 watts in the evening hours.

The station's format is primarily classic hits.

== History ==
WWCB signed on on April 2, 1955, as WOTR. It moved to its current location on North Center Street over 30 years ago and become WWCB, standing for the local high school mascot, the "Corry Beavers".

As WWCB in the 1970s, 1980s and early 1990s, the station featured long time personalities Bruce Lewis, Ron Smith and Barry Warnshius, with country music first thing in the morning and modern top 40 hits the rest of the day. The station was owned by Erie broadcasting icon Art Arkelian, who also owned FM station WYSS in Saegertown.

After the station was sold in the 1990s, it became full-service Power 1370 (Oldies), and was part of a two-station network with WYNE (now WZTE) in North East. WZTE is now owned by Inspiration Time, Inc.

In September 2010, Vilkie Communications took over operations of the station changing it to match their "Cool" moniker, based on "Cool 101.7" WMVL in Meadville. The station featured oldies from the 1960s, 1970s and 1980s and took on the call letters WHYP, which had been licensed to North East (and was the original callsign for the current WZTE).

On December 1, 2011, Whiplash Radio LLC signed an LMA/purchase agreement on WHYP, keeping the Cool name, and instituting a more tightly programmed classic hits format. The station featured syndicated morning personality Charlie Tuna in mornings, Barry Warnshius in middays and station operator Chris Lash in afternoons. Dick Bartley's Classic Countdown and Rock and Roll's Greatest Hits programs were heard on the weekends.

On July 15, 2013, the Mid State Sports Network signed an LMA/Purchase Agreement on WHYP. In order to avoid any confusion with another area radio station, Cool 101.7 - WMVL in Meadville, management decided to drop WHYP and return to the WWCB call sign under the slogan: "Corry's Hometown Radio Station". That change became effective on August 30, 2013.

Former station co-owner Sam Jordan is the station's primary local on-air host, airing during morning drive, with the rest of the station's lineup coming from a syndicated country network. The station airs The Crook and Chase Countdown Show, and other syndicated shows on the weekend. Kickin' Country 1370 also offers other syndicated programs including NASCAR USA, Motor Racing Network, and Performance Racing Network's talk shows. CBS Radio News provides world and national news reports, while local news is handled by Sam Jordan and First Warning Weather covered by WSEE-TV.

Effective April 30, 2019, William Stafford bought out his co-owner Sam Jordan's interest in the station for $15,000, transferring the license from Greater Corry Area Broadcasting, LLP to his Route 6 Broadcasting Area Partnership. In May 2021, Stafford sold the station to Lake Erie College of Osteopathic Medicine, which also owns noncommercial radio station WMCE-FM. The sale, which included translator W231DW, was consummated on September 3, 2021, at a price of $70,000.

In March 2026, LECOM sold WWCB and W231DW back to Vilkie, through J2 Media, at a price of $22,000. This was due to overlaping signals with WERI 102.7 Also serving Corry.
