= WERI (FM) =

Radio station in Wattsburg, Pennsylvania

- Wattsburg, Pennsylvania; United States
- Frequency: 102.7 MHz

Programming
- Format: Classic hits

Ownership
- Owner: Lake Erie College of Osteopathic Medicine, Inc.
- Sister stations: WMCE-FM, WWCB

History
- First air date: December 2007; 18 years ago
- Former call signs: WNAE-FM (2007–2011); WCGM (2011–2023)
- Call sign meaning: Erie

Technical information
- Licensing authority: FCC
- Facility ID: 164188
- Class: A
- ERP: 3,500 watts
- HAAT: 132.0 meters (433.1 ft)
- Transmitter coordinates: 41°59′57″N 79°41′59″W

Links
- Public license information: Public file; LMS

WERI (102.7 MHz) is an FM radio station broadcasting a Classic Hits radio format. Licensed to serve Wattsburg, Pennsylvania, plays Classic Hits. It is owned by Lake Erie College of Osteopathic Medicine, Inc.

== History ==
WERI previously held the call sign WNAE-FM, aired a country music format, and was temporarily a simulcast of sister station WKNB. At this time, the station was licensed to Clarendon, Pennsylvania, United States, and was owned by Frank Iorio under his holding company Iorio Broadcasting, Inc. In 2010, WNAE-FM was sold to Family Life Ministries, with the intention of moving the station from Clarendon to Wattsburg. The call sign was changed to WCGM on June 15, 2011, swapping with a Family Life-owned construction permit in Belfast, New York. The relocated WCGM relaunched as a Family Life Network station in October 2011.

Effective July 20, 2023, Family Life Ministries sold WCGM to Lake Erie College of Osteopathic Medicine, Inc. Coincident with the closing of the sale, the station changed its call sign to WERI, with the WCGM call sign moving to a construction permit Family Life Ministries is in the process of acquiring in Somerset, Pennsylvania.
