= Erie Philharmonic =

Orchestra in Erie, Pennsylvania, United States

- Orchestra
- Former name: Erie Symphony Orchestra; Erie Second Symphony Orchestra; Second Philharmonic
- Founded: 1913
- Concert hall: Warner Theatre
- Principal conductor: Daniel Meyer
- Website: www.EriePhil.org

Founded in 1913, the Erie Philharmonic is a professional orchestra located in Erie, Pennsylvania. The philharmonic has held their performances at the 2,500-seat Warner Theatre on State Street in downtown Erie since 1974.

== History ==
The musicians' union attempted to form a symphonic orchestra in the late 1890s, but there was no popular support in Erie, and the effort died. Another attempt to produce a symphony occurred in April 1913, when a group of 40 to 50 musicians rehearsed for months for a performance of Tchaikovsky's 1812 Overture and Edvard Grieg's Peer Gynt Suite. The concert never took place.

It was only months later, on November 30, 1913, that the Erie Symphony Orchestra, Erie Phil's earliest iteration, was born. It lasted just over two years, with its final concert held on February 20, 1916. On January 30, 1921, the orchestra was reorganized as the Second Symphony Orchestra. It lasted five years, with its final concert held on May 2. 1926.

The First Philharmonic held its first concert on February 8, 1921. The Second Philharmonic held its first concert on February 7, 1932. The Erie Phil disbanded for the duration of World War II, then incorporated on September 23, 1947. It has performed in Erie ever since.

The Erie Philharmonic Chorus was formed in 1953, and the Erie Junior Philharmonic was established in 1947.

== Music directors ==
- 1913–1916 Franz Kohler
- 1920–1926 Henry B. Vincent
- 1931–1947 John R. Metcalf
- 1947–1953 Fritz Mahler
- 1953–1967 James Sample
- 1967–1973 John A. Gosling
- 1973–1976 Harold Bauer
- 1976–1990 Walter Hendl
- 1990–1995 Eiji Oue
- 1996–2000 Peter Bay
- 2000–2006 Hugh Keelan
- 2007–present Daniel Meyer
