= Tim Miller (poet) =

American poet and writer

Tim Miller (born August 23, 1979) is an American poet and nonfiction writer of works that reflect ancient literature, world mythology, and religious scripture. In 2015 he published a narrative poem, To the House of the Sun.

== Publishing ==
Along with Paul Jessup, Miller founded Six Gallery Press in 2000. In 2004 they handed ownership of the press off to a collective formed by some of its other authors. In 2006, he and his wife, Jenny Miller, started S4N Books, a publisher of long poems and reprints of literary and religious nonfiction. Their authors include the British poet and scholar William Anderson and poet Adam Penna.

== Works ==
- To the House of the Sun (2015, long poem)
- Virtues (nonfiction, in progress)
- Hymns & Lamentations (2011, poetry/prayers)
- The Lit World: Poem from History (2008, poetry)
- Language of the Living (2005, novel)
- Fusion (2003, long poem)
- Songs of Innocence (2002, poetry/prose collage, memoir)
- Death by Water (2001, novel)
- The Valley of Ashes (2000, short fiction and poetry)
- Acceleration (2000, poetry/prose collage)
- Suburban Vertigo (1999, poetry in the anthology Illegible Stone)
- Ash and Other Poems (1998, poetry)
