= WXTA =

Radio station in Edinboro, Pennsylvania

- Edinboro, Pennsylvania; United States
- Broadcast area: Erie metropolitan area
- Frequency: 97.9 MHz
- Branding: Erie Country 97.9

Programming
- Format: Country music
- Affiliations: Westwood One

Ownership
- Owner: Cumulus Media; (Radio License Holding CBC, LLC)
- Sister stations: WRIE; WQHZ; WXKC

History
- First air date: October 15, 1988; 37 years ago
- Former call signs: WMYJ-FM (1988–1989)

Technical information
- Licensing authority: FCC
- Facility ID: 72892
- Class: B1
- ERP: 10,000 watts
- HAAT: 154 meters (505 ft)
- Transmitter coordinates: 41°57′59.1″N 80°6′39.2″W
- Translator: 96.3 W242CU (Erie)

Links
- Public license information: Public file; LMS
- Webcast: Listen live
- Website: www.eriecountry.com

WXTA (97.9 FM) is a commercial radio station licensed to Edinboro, Pennsylvania, and broadcasting to the Erie radio market. Owned by Cumulus Media, WXTA airs a country music radio format branded as "Erie Country 97.9". The station carries the syndicated morning drive time show Dallas and Kincaid from co-owned WKHX-FM Atlanta. WXTA's studios were located at 471 Robison Road West in Erie.

WXTA has an effective radiated power (ERP) of 10,000 watts. The transmitter is near Oliver Road and Golden Road in McKean.

== History ==
The station signed on the air on October 15, 1988. The power was 3,000 watts, a fraction of its current output. The original call sign was WMYJ, playing an adult contemporary format for a year as "Y-98". The studios were at 4910 Richmond Street in Erie.

WMYJ was purchased by Bob Winters (WinCapp Broadcasting) over the summer of 1989. The format was switch to country music at noon on September 11, 1989, and the station took the call letters WXTA.

WXTA was sold to Jim Embrescia's Media One Group in 1996, then to Regent Communications (now Townsquare Media) in 1999, then to Citadel Broadcasting in 2004, and most recently to Cumulus Media in 2011.

Former air personalities at WXTA include "Uncle Fred" Horton, Bobby Reed, Ron Kline, Mike McKay, Natalie Massing, John Cunningham, "Big John" Jacobs, Ed Beeler, Bobbi Weston, Brian Williams, Rick Shigo, Chris Atkins, Dale Thompson, Chet Price, Bill Shannon, Laura Luke, Jim Mirabello, Adam Reese, John Gallagher, Tom Lavery, Sammy James, Jay Foyst, Herb Palmer, Dan "Shoeless" Sheldon, Ellie McVay, Truckin' Tom, Cindy Wear and Becca Lynn. Morning Personality "Uncle Fred" Horton died on March 4, 2008.

On February 3, 2014, WXTA, along with nine other Cumulus-owned country music stations, made the switch to going under the Nash FM branding. On March 28, 2024, the station dropped the Nash FM branding, rebranding to Erie Country 97.9.

Former syndicated programming on WXTA included After Midnite with Blair Garner, Big D and Bubba, Country Gold Saturday Night and Neon Nights with Lia.

Current on-air personalities include Mike Sheffield.

== FM translator ==
Since March 2025, WXTA has been rebroadcast over a low-power FM translator to improve reception in Erie:

Broadcast translator for WXTA
Call sign	Frequency	City of license	FID	ERP (W)	HAAT	Class	Transmitter coordinates	FCC info
W242CU	96.3 FM	Erie, Pennsylvania	146827	173	24 m (79 ft)	D	42°6′15″N 80°4′9″W	LMS
