= WCTL =

Radio station in Erie, Pennsylvania

- Erie, Pennsylvania; United States
- Broadcast area: Erie, Pennsylvania
- Frequency: 106.3 MHz (HD Radio)
- Branding: 106.3 WCTL

Programming
- Format: Christian hot AC

Ownership
- Owner: Inspiration Time, Inc.

History
- First air date: April 23, 1967
- Former call signs: WBVB (1967–1972)
- Call sign meaning: With Christ, There's Life

Technical information
- Licensing authority: FCC
- Facility ID: 28774
- Class: A
- ERP: 860 watts
- HAAT: 262.1 meters (860 ft)
- Transmitter coordinates: 42.001°N 79.876°W
- Translators: 93.1 W226BQ (Girard); 99.1 W256AL (North East); 105.9 W290BI (Erie)

Links
- Public license information: Public file; LMS
- Webcast: Listen live
- Website: wctl.org

WCTL is a Christian radio station on 106.3 FM in Erie, Pennsylvania. The station is owned and operated by Inspiration Time, Inc.

== History ==
The 106.3 license began operations as WBVB, licensed to Union City, on April 23, 1967. The call letters came from the original owners, William E. Baker and Virgil A. Brown. The four-month-old FM outlet would go through a major transformation when a group of 21 Christian businessmen and pastors, organized as Inspiration Time, Inc., became a part-owner of the Bee Bee Broadcasting Company on October 3, 1967 (with FCC approval obtained in early 1968); when Inspiration Time bought the station outright in 1971, it changed the call letters to the present WCTL on February 1, 1972; a power increase from 435 to 3,000 watts followed that April. A translator in Erie was first established in 1978.

The station grew again in the early 1990s when it increased its power to 6,000 watts. A translator was also briefly put into service in Oil City before it was displaced by a new full-service FM station. More translators were built in North East, Warren, and Jamestown, New York; the Warren and Jamestown translators, as well as WYVL in Youngsville, a station that had been donated to Inspiration Time by original WBVB owner Baker at his death, were sold to the Calvary Church of Russell in 2012 and now operate as a separate Christian radio station.

In 2017, in conjunction with WCTL's 50th anniversary, Inspiration Time conducted a capital fundraising campaign to fund the purchase of radio station WZTE from Mercyhurst University in order to change its community of license to Union City. By maintaining a station licensed to Union City, WCTL would be able to change its city of license to Erie and move its signal closer to the population center of Erie County. The FCC granted construction permits for the project; on January 2, 2019 construction was completed, and program testing began on the new WCTL facility near the intersection of US 19 and Interstate 90.

Since the mid-1980s, WCTL has provided live coverage of high school football contests as a service to the community, expanding from single team coverage to multiple schools in 1993.

== Translators ==
WCTL has translators in towns in either direction along the shore of Lake Erie. The Girard translator is owned by Girard Alliance Church.

Broadcast translators for WCTL
Call sign	Frequency	City of license	FID	ERP (W)	HAAT	Class	FCC info
W256AL	99.1 FM	North East, Pennsylvania	141622	200	−0.2 m (−1 ft)	D	LMS
W226BQ	93.1 FM	Girard, Pennsylvania	141643	38	4.6 m (15 ft)	D	LMS
