= Renaissance Centre (Erie, Pennsylvania) =

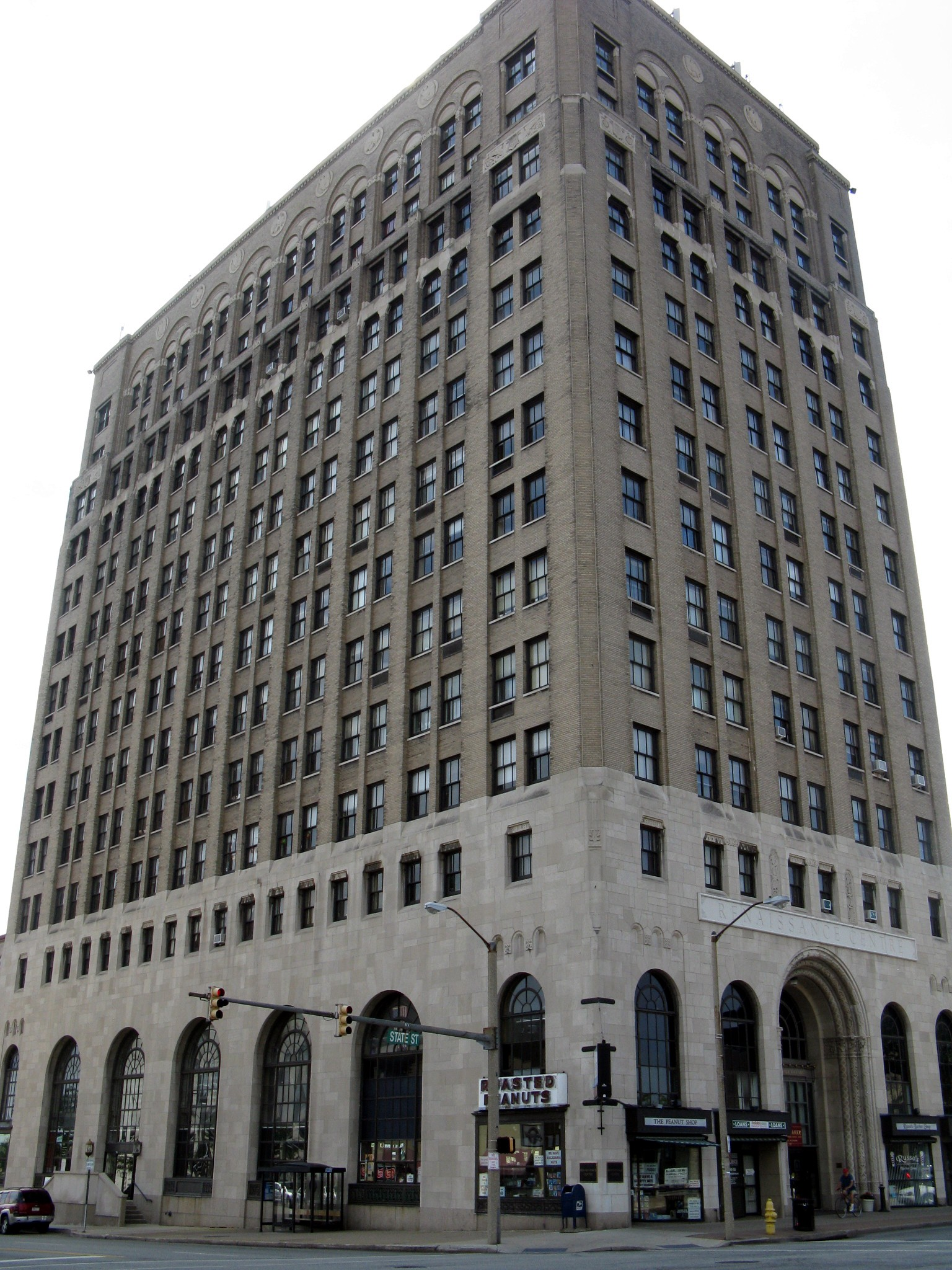
- North and west sides of Renaissance Centre, July 2010
- Interactive map of the Renaissance Centre area
- Former names: G. Daniel Baldwin Building; Erie Trust Company Building

General information
- Type: Office building
- Architectural style: Art Deco, Renaissance Revival
- Location: 1001–1007 State Street; Erie, Pennsylvania; United States
- Coordinates: 42°7′31.75″N 80°4′55.38″W
- Construction started: 1925
- Completed: 1928
- Renovated: 1996–1998, 2026-2028.
- Cost: $2 million

Height
- Height: 198 ft (60 m)

Technical details
- Floor count: 14
- Floor area: 150,000 sq ft (14,000 m^{2})

Design and construction
- Architecture firm: Dennison & Hirons

U.S. National Register of Historic Places
- Official name: Erie Trust Company Building
- Designated: August 10, 2000
- Reference no.: 00000967

Renaissance Centre, formerly known as the Erie Trust Company Building and the G. Daniel Baldwin Building, is a 198-foot (60 m) skyscraper located in Erie, Pennsylvania in the United States. Intended to be the headquarters for the largest bank in Erie, the Erie Trust Company Building was designed by the firm Dennison and Hiron in 1925. Completed in 1928 at the climax of the Roaring Twenties, the building's namesake bank failed in 1933 after the start of the Great Depression. It was renamed the G. Daniel Baldwin Building in 1943. In 1996, it became Renaissance Centre and was listed on National Register of Historic Places in 2000.

== Design ==
Renaissance Centre is located in downtown Erie at the intersection of State Street, the main north–south thoroughfare in Erie, and East 10th Street. It is the city's sole skyscraper and dominates the city skyline. Renaissance Centre has a height of 198 feet (60 m) and is the tallest "multi-story building" in Erie, Pennsylvania, but second-tallest overall; the central spire of St. Peter Cathedral is taller at 265 feet (81 m). The building itself is 82 1/2 feet (25.1 m) deep, 161 feet (49 m) wide, and has a footprint of 1/3 acre (0.1 ha). The first three floors on the north and west fronts of Renaissance Centre are faced with Indiana limestone while the remaining floors are clad in "light buff-colored" brick. Its main entrance on State Street consists of multiple, set-back arches that rise one-and-a-half stories up the facade. The building's name is engraved on a faux-limestone sign mounted above the archway. Starting at the 11th floor, the building is setback. Unlike the north and west, the south and east facades are relatively unadorned; the central window bays on the southern side are recessed causing the entire building to take on a "shallow 'U'-shape" when viewed from above.

Renaissance Centre has a total floor space of 150,000 square feet (14,000 m^{2}) spread across its 14 floors. Originally, the first floor comprised the bank lobby, but has been divvied up into an atrium and retail spaces for businesses. Six murals by New York painter Edward A. Turnbull depicting events from Erie history were located on the first floor; five remain, but were hidden by renovations. The 14th floor offers views of Presque Isle State Park, Lake Erie and, on clear days, Long Point, Canada.

== History ==
Shortly after the passage of the National Bank Act by Congress in 1864, several banks were chartered in Erie. One of these, Dime Savings and Loan, was founded in 1866; it was reorganized as the Erie Trust Company in 1902. The economic boom following World War I set off a flurry of building activity in downtown Erie, including a ten-story skyscraper at 12th and State Streets. By the mid-1920s, the Erie Trust Company had become the dominant banking institution in the city and needed space to expand. The bank hired the New York City-architectural firm Dennison and Hirons in 1925 to design its new headquarters—the firm also designed the Home Savings Bank Building in Albany, New York. The Erie Trust Company Building was completed in 1928 at a cost of $2 million. A year later, the stock market crashed sparking the Great Depression, and, by 1933, the Erie Trust Company went bankrupt. Its remnants and that of another defunct bank were reorganized into the National Bank and Trust, which continued to occupy its former headquarters now owned by the Commonwealth of Pennsylvania.

The state auctioned off the Erie Trust Company Building in 1943 in a bankruptcy court and was acquired by the Tenth Street Building Corporation, a local real estate company, for $377,000. The building was renamed after company's president at the time, G. Daniel Baldwin, in 1945; Baldwin died the next year. National Bank and Trust continued to lease the first floor, along with offices on the third, until it was taken over by First National Bank in 1951; First National maintained a presence in the Baldwin Building until the 1980s. Despite its owners operating a "large and profitable" business, the occupancy in the building decreased to less than 30 percent in the 1970s and 1980s.

The G. Daniel Baldwin Building was, again, put up for auction in June 1996. The Tenth Street Building Corporation donated the building to the Greater Erie Charity Golf Classic where it sold to local developer Tom Kennedy for $315,000 with the proceeds going to charity. Kennedy also owns and oversaw the development of the Palace Hardware Building into apartments and a business center. The Baldwin Building was renamed Renaissance Centre as part of the effort to revitalize the building; a new sign, fashioned to resemble its limestone cladding, was installed over the old name. From its purchase in 1996 to late 1998, Renaissance Centre underwent a $2.2 million restoration. Renaissance Centre was listed on the National Register of Historic Places on August 10, 2000. As of the mid 2020s, there are plans to convert the Renaissance Centre into an upscale hotel.

== See also ==
- List of tallest buildings in Pennsylvania
- National Register of Historic Places listings in Erie County, Pennsylvania

== Sources ==
- Federal Writers' Project (1939). Erie: A Guide to the City and County. William Penn Association.
- Guerriero, John (October 7, 1998). "Renaissance Centre proving true to its name". Erie Morning News. pp. 1A, 9A.
- Kennedy, Thomas (October 15, 1999). "Erie Trust Company Building". National Register of Historic Places Registration Form. National Archives and Records Administration. NAID 71995519. Archived from the original on September 21, 2025.
- Poisson, Lindsey (January 3, 1999). "Renaissance Centre owner seeks investors". Erie Times-News. Archived from the original on June 10, 2015.
