= Star Beacon =

American newspaper in Ohio, founded 1885

- Type: Daily newspaper
- Format: Broadsheet
- Owner(s): Community Newspaper Holdings Inc.
- Publisher: Sharon Sorg
- Editor: TBD
- Founded: 1885
- Headquarters: 4626 Park Avenue, Ashtabula, Ohio 44005 United States
- Circulation: 10,573 daily
- Price: USD 1.00 daily, 1.75 Saturday/Sunday "Weekend Edition"
- Website: starbeacon.com

The Star Beacon is a seven-day morning daily newspaper published in Ashtabula, Ohio, United States. It is owned by Community Newspaper Holdings Inc. It is published Monday through Friday, and a Weekend Edition delivered on Saturday mornings. It does publish a Sunday edition.

Its marketing slogan is "Your daily connection to the community".
