= WMCE-FM =

Radio station in Erie, Pennsylvania

Coordinates: 42.090°N 79.943°W

- Erie, Pennsylvania; United States
- Broadcast area: Erie, Pennsylvania
- Frequency: 88.5 MHz
- Branding: LECOM Radio

Programming
- Format: Classic hits

Ownership
- Owner: Lake Erie College of Osteopathic Medicine, Inc.
- Sister stations: WERI, WWCB

History
- First air date: 1989
- Former call signs: WMCY (1989)
- Call sign meaning: Mercyhurst College Erie

Technical information
- Licensing authority: FCC
- Facility ID: 41215
- Class: A
- ERP: 750 watts
- HAAT: 152 meters (499 ft)
- Repeater: 1370 WWCB (Corry)

Links
- Public license information: Public file; LMS
- Webcast: Listen Live
- Website: wmce.lecomradio.com

WMCE-FM (88.5 MHz) is a non-commercial classic hits radio station in Erie, Pennsylvania, owned and operated by Lake Erie College of Osteopathic Medicine. WMCE-FM was simulcast on sister station WMCE 1530 AM until its sale on September 1, 2017. The transmitter is located near Knoyle Road and Dewey Road outside of Erie.

== History ==
=== Formation as WMCY ===
After Mercyhurst College acquired the frequency, 88.5 first signed on as WMCY on February 3, 1989. It was a mixed format station broadcasting classic rock, Broadway musicals, talk programs and more. It eventually switched to opera and classical and then changed formats again in January 2009 to nearly exclusively jazz music.

=== JAZZ FM ===
Under the direction of station manager Mike Leal with programming assistance from Tom Lavery in 2010, the station switched to jazz programming in January 2009. Content was provided by local hosts, and weekly regional shows. Programs included Jazz at Lincoln Center, Jazz Profiles, Jazz Variations, Radio Deluxe, European Jazz Stage, Latin Jazz Perspectives, Blues Before Sunrise, Juke in the Back, Blues and Beyond, Frank's Place, Swingin' Down the Lane and The Jazz Scene. Jazz hosts included Bob Protzman, Mark Richard, Helen Wigger, Tony Mowod, Bill Hillgrove. Additional programming was streamed using satellite services.

=== "The Greatest Hits of all Time" ===
Under the management of Dan Geary, WMCE changed formats to classic hits in January 2013. The station and features many more local hosts and less syndicated programming. Hosts on WMCE now include former Erie radio and TV personalities.

Captain Dan, hosted Erie morning radio at WMCE until his passing, was replaced by WJET TV personality Lou Baxter with his "Coffee and Classics" program. Johnny Holiday, an Erie radio legend hosts middays. Afternoon drive and the is managed by Commander Bill. The Commander is followed by the Dr. Denny Woytek. Weekends are handled by Nat "The Hat" Massing (Saturday mornings only), Teri Bohen and Jewel Leigh. Johnny Holiday also handles Saturday evenings and featuring spotlight hour themes. Sunday mornings from 9 to noon it broadcasts Bob and Alice Koziel and the Polka Celebration.

WMCE is a broadcast service of Lake Erie College of Osteopathic Medicine (LECOM), said institution having purchased the station in 2018 from Mercyhurst University. Mercyhurst no longer is connected to WMCE.

In May 2021, WMCE-FM purchased WWCB, 1370/94.1 a commercially licensed AM radio station based in Corry, Pennsylvania, from Bill Stafford.

Effective July 20, 2023, Family Life Ministries sold WCGM 102.7 in Wattsburg to LECOM. Coincident with the closing of the sale, the station changed its call sign to WERI. They now simulcast WMCE full time with better reception south and east of Erie. With the purchase making WWCB redundant, LECOM divested WWCB to its former owner Joe Vilkie in March 2026.
