= Henry B. Vincent =

American composer and organist (1872–1941)

Henry Bethuel Vincent
- Born: December 28, 1872; Denver, Colorado Territory, US
- Died: January 7, 1941 (aged 68); Erie, Pennsylvania, US
- Education: Oberlin Conservatory of Music
- Occupations: Composer, lecturer, organist
- Known for: Founder of Erie Playhouse (1916–1941); Conductor of Erie Philharmonic (1920–1926)

Henry Bethuel Vincent (December 28, 1872 – January 7, 1941) was an American composer and organist. Vincent was the founder of the Erie Playhouse and directed it from 1916 to 1941. Vincent was director of the Erie Philharmonic from 1920 to 1926 after it was reorganized after World War I.

== Early life ==
Vincent was born on December 28, 1872, in Denver, Colorado. He graduated from the Oberlin Conservatory of Music.
