= WXTG-FM =

- Virginia Beach, Virginia; United States
- Broadcast area: Southside of Hampton Roads
- Frequency: 102.1 MHz
- Branding: Streetz 87.7 & 102.1

Programming
- Format: Urban contemporary (WMTO-LD TV-6 simulcast)

Ownership
- Owner: Davis Media, LLC
- Sister stations: WBQK; WTYD

History
- First air date: 2001 (as WWHV)
- Former call signs: WANN (1999–2001); WWHV (2001–2007); WXTG (1/2007–12/2007)
- Call sign meaning: "The Game", format 2007–2013

Technical information
- Licensing authority: FCC
- Facility ID: 14327
- Class: A
- ERP: 6,000 watts
- HAAT: 100 meters (330 ft)
- Transmitter coordinates: 36°45′7.5″N 76°8′55.8″W

Links
- Public license information: Public file; LMS
- Webcast: Listen live
- Website: streetz877.com

WXTG-FM (102.1 MHz, "Streetz 87.7 & 102.1") is a commercial FM radio station licensed to Virginia Beach, Virginia, and serving the Southside of Hampton Roads. It is owned and operated by Davis Media, LLC. WXTG-FM airs an urban contemporary radio format.

The transmitter for WXTG-FM is off Elbow Road in Chesapeake, Virginia. Studios and offices are on Little Neck Road in Virginia Beach.

== History ==
WXTG-FM signed on in August 2001 as WANN. It later became mainstream urban as "Hot 102.1" under the callsign WWHV. WWHV's then owner, On Top Communications, went into bankruptcy in 2005.

WWHV was bought by Red Zebra Broadcasting in 2007. The company had already owned WXTG, and began simulcasting the two stations beginning January 29, 2007. On the air, the stations usually only used the FM's frequency, except once per hour for the formal station identification. Under Red Zebra, WXTG-AM-FM aired a sports radio format.

"102.1 The Game" carried most of the Fox Sports Radio lineup as well as all games of the Washington Redskins (like Red Zebra, owned by Daniel Snyder). The station had one local weekday show, The 757 Club, which is named for the region's area code. The hosts were John "Johnny D" Decandido and Bartley "Pretty Boy" Barefoot. Decandido was a former host on Fox Sports Radio, and Barefoot is a graduate of Old Dominion University.

On July 30, 2013, Red Zebra sold WXTG-AM-FM to Williamsburg-based Davis Media, LLC for $1.2 million. The sale was consummated on April 7, 2014. Davis Media, LLC, also owns WTYD in Deltaville, Virginia and WBQK in West Point, Virginia. On August 1, 2013, WXTG-FM began simulcasting WTYD's adult album alternative (AAA) music format.

On January 7, 2019, WXTG-AM-FM became a 24-hour news and business station, calling itself "All News 102." The AAA format continued on co-owned WTYD.

On June 5, 2020, WXTG-AM-FM dropped the "All News 102" news format and switched back to a simulcast of AAA-formatted WTYD.

On July 15, 2020, WXTG-FM flipped to urban contemporary, branded as "Streetz 87.7 & 102.1" (simulcasting low-power TV station WMTO-LP channel 6, which airs at 87.75 MHz in anticipation of the latter frequency shutting down on July 13 of the next year, but did not).
