= WBQK =

- West Point, Virginia; United States
- Broadcast area: Virginia Peninsula; Middle Peninsula
- Frequency: 107.9 MHz
- Branding: Cannon Country 107.9

Programming
- Format: Country

Ownership
- Owner: Local Daily Media; (Davis Media, LLC)
- Sister stations: WTYD, WXTG-FM

History
- First air date: July 1991
- Former call signs: WPTG (1989–2000); WWBR (2000–2005); WTYD (2005–2005)
- Call sign meaning: play on the name "Bach" (former classical format)

Technical information
- Licensing authority: FCC
- Facility ID: 73906
- Class: A
- ERP: 4,000 watts
- HAAT: 100 meters (330 ft)
- Transmitter coordinates: 37°27′0.0″N 76°48′46.0″W

Links
- Public license information: Public file; LMS
- Webcast: Listen live
- Website: cannoncountry1079.com

WBQK (107.9 MHz) is a commercial country station licensed to West Point, Virginia, and broadcasting to Virginia Peninsula and the Middle Peninsula. It is owned by Local Daily Media, a subsidiary of Davis Media. It is one of three country-format stations owned by Davis Media, alongside WNTB in North Carolina and WFRE in Maryland.

WBQK's studios are located in Williamsburg, Virginia, while its transmitter is located in the nearby Barhamsville. In addition to a standard analog transmission, WBQK streams via online webcast.

== History ==
The station first went on the air in July 1991 under the call sign WPTG. In June of 2005, the station was acquired by Davis Media for $1.13M and briefly carried the call sign WTYD before switching to WBQK that December. The station began carrying a classical music format in May 2006, branded as "BACH-FM".

On June 1, 2019, WBQK changed from classical music to a simulcast of "All News 102" WXTG-FM. On June 5, 2020, WBQK flipped from that simulcast to a simulcast of adult album alternative-formatted WTYD, branded as "The Tide".

On March 17, 2024, WBQK broke away from the simulcast and flipped to country music as Cannon Country, launching with a three-week "10,000 songs in a row" broadcast. Since its debut, the station brand has welcomed current talents "Cash" Warren (formerly of WGH-FM) and Gideon Dean (formerly of WONY).
