= Downtown Erie =

Coordinates: 42.1155°N 80.0642°W

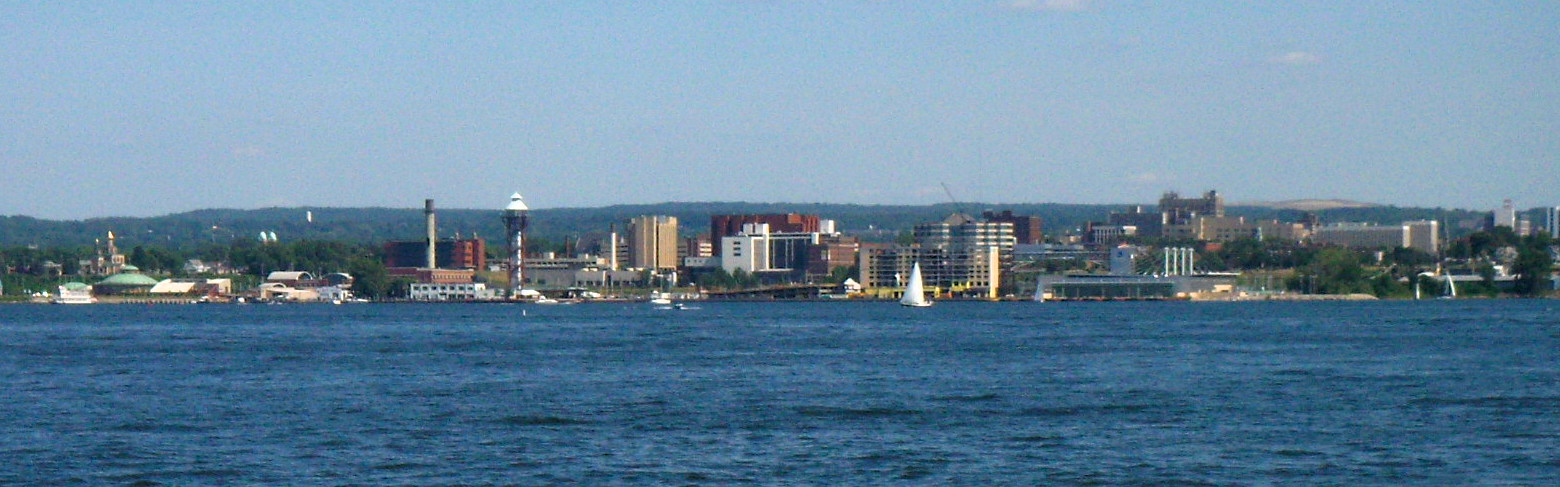
Downtown Erie skyline

Downtown Erie, is the central business, cultural and government center for the city of Erie, Pennsylvania, United States. Erie’s Central Business District includes Gannon University, UPMC Hamot hospital, Erie Insurance, and city and county government offices, as well as other non-government related commercial retail and office development. Nearly 20,000 people work in downtown Erie. As of 2000, 2,690 people lived downtown.

== Location ==
Downtown Erie is a 70 block area. From the foot of State Street to 14th Street (North and South), and from Holland Street to Sassafras Street (East and West).

== Transportation ==
- Trolley- Downtown is served by the Erie Metropolitan Transit Authority (EMTA)'s Bay Liner trolley system, a free trolley service that travels from the foot of State Street to 14th Street.
- Bus- The EMTA's buses runs seven days a week in the city.

== Downtown Districts ==
Downtown Erie is divided into three different areas, Bayfront Landing, downtown center city and midtown.

=== Bayfront Landing ===
Erie's Bayfront Landing is home to a variety of hotels, bars, restaurants, and tourist attractions such as the Erie Maritime Museum, Erie Convention Center, and The Bicentennial Tower.

=== Center City ===
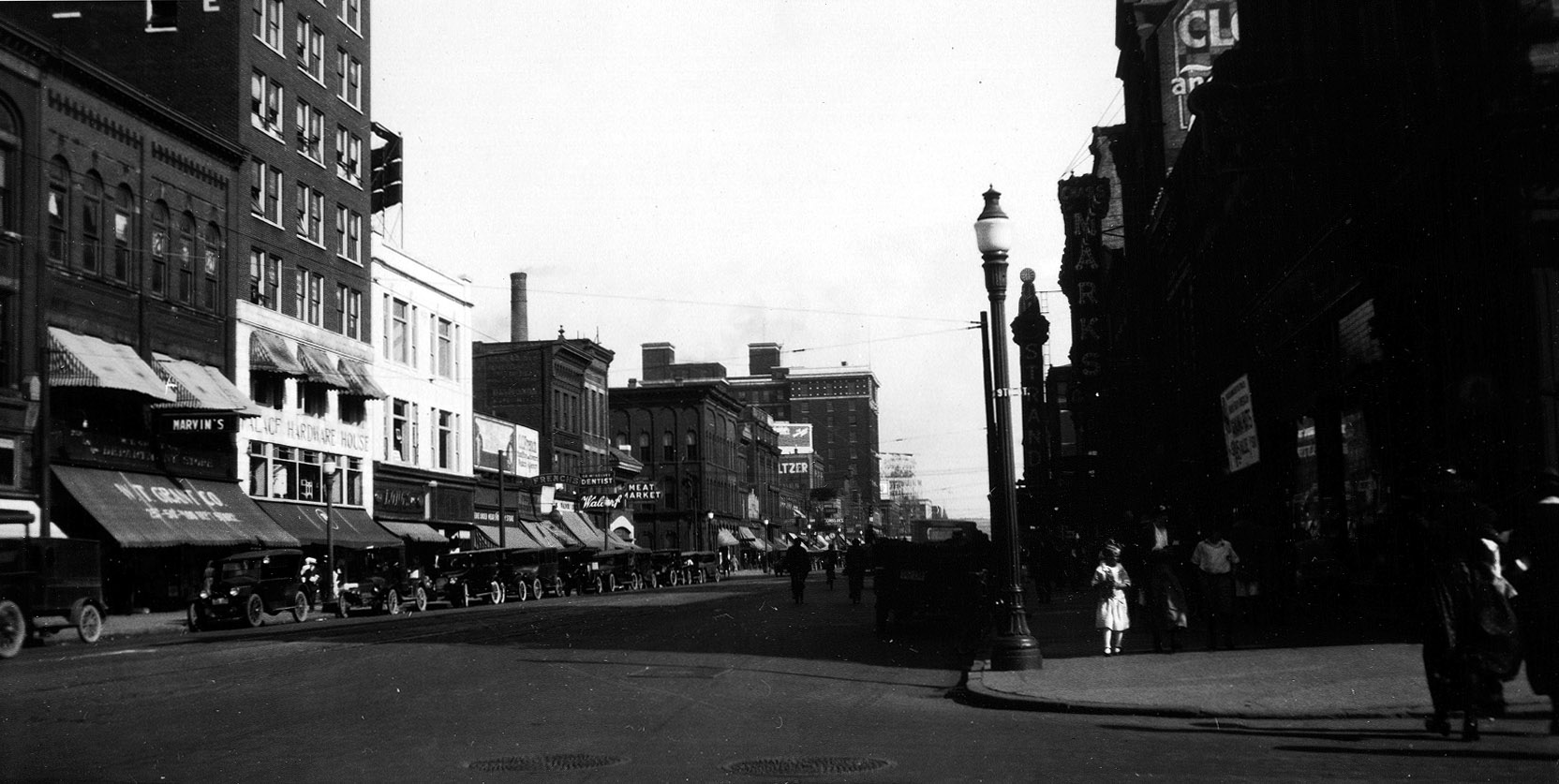
Downtown in the 1920s

Center City is where many of the Erie’s high rise buildings are located. The Renaissance Centre is Erie’s tallest building. Located in the center city are: The Boston Store, The Warner Theatre, Erie Insurance Arena, UPMC Park, Perry Square, restaurants, bars and night clubs as well as many retail shops. Center city is also home to 14 banks. Also located in the center city is Gannon University, as well St. Peter's Cathedral. The cathedral is the city's largest structure, standing 265 feet (81 m) tall.

=== Midtown ===
Midtown, located from 18th Street/Former Norfolk Southern tracks to 26th Street.

== Downtown redevelopment ==
The Erie Redevelopment Authority made a master plan to redevelop the entire downtown area. As of fall 2009 the first phase was nearly complete. The first phase was the redevelopment of midtown. Other redevelopments of the downtown include: a $42 million renovation to the Erie Insurance Arena, streetscape improvements to 12th street, facade improvements to many downtown buildings, new building and retail development and new townhouses and residential condos along the bayfront bluffs.

== Lower Downtown ==
Downtown Erie has undergone a revival in the early 2020s with the recent construction of apartments, specialty shops, a rock climbing gym, food hall, and public market.
