= WXKC =

Coordinates: 42.090°N 79.953°W

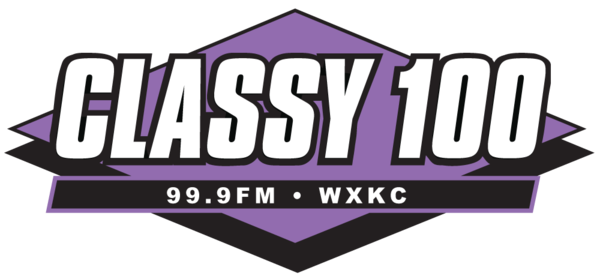
- Erie, Pennsylvania; United States
- Broadcast area: Erie metropolitan area
- Frequency: 99.9 MHz (HD Radio)
- Branding: Classy 100

Programming
- Format: Adult contemporary
- Subchannels: HD2: "104.3 The Touch" (Adult R&B); HD3: News/talk
- Affiliations: Compass Media Networks

Ownership
- Owner: Cumulus Media; (Radio License Holding CBC, LLC)
- Sister stations: WQHZ, WXTA, WRIE

History
- First air date: 1949; 77 years ago
- Former call signs: WERC-FM (1949–1960); WWYN-FM (1960–1965); WWFM (1966–1975); WLVU (1975–1985)

Technical information
- Licensing authority: FCC
- Facility ID: 32984
- Class: B
- ERP: 50,000 watts
- HAAT: 150 meters (490 ft)
- Translators: HD2: 104.3 W282BR (Erie); HD3: 98.7 W254AJ (Erie)

Links
- Public license information: Public file; LMS
- Webcast: Listen live Listen live (HD2)
- Website: www.classy100.com www.1043thevibe.com (HD2)

WXKC (99.9 FM), branded as Classy 100, is a commercial radio station in Erie, Pennsylvania. It is owned by Cumulus Media and broadcasts an adult contemporary radio format, switching to Christmas music for much of November and December.

WXKC's studios were located at 471 Robison Rd West in Erie, while its transmitter is located near Knoyle Rd and Heibel Rd outside of Erie. WXKC broadcasts using HD Radio technology. Its HD2 digital subchannel airs an adult R&B format branded as "104.3 The Touch". The HD2 signal feeds FM translator W282BR at 104.3 MHz, while the HD3 subchannel airs a Christian Music format feeding a translator on 98.7 FM.

== History ==
=== Beginnings ===
The station first went on the air in 1949 as WERC-FM, the FM counterpart to WERC (1260 AM), becoming WWYN-FM in 1960 and WWFM in 1966. The call sign was changed to WLVU in 1975.

For many years until the mid-1980s, this was Erie's heritage easy listening radio station. The station ran automated for almost its entire existence until its purchase by K & K Radio Broadcasting station on April 1, 1985, when it was changed to an AC oldies station "Easy Rock 999", which operated for several months on the automation system.

Following the purchase by K & K, and amid declines in the easy listening format, Don Kelly took Eazy Rock 99.9 live to Classy 100 WXKC adult contemporary on June 15, 1985, much like what it is today.

The original announcing staff when Classy 100 launched in the Spring of 1985 was: Morning Drive/Program Director-Dana Bolles, Mid-Days-Paul Davies, Afternoon Drive/Promotions Director-Joe DeSantis, Love Songs 7-Midnight-Kristi Nelson. One year after launch the station, with this crew, was selected as Medium Market Station of the Year runner up.

The original Sales Team members: Carolyn Buckel, Don Dalesio, Don Alberstadt, Paul Wickles and General Sales Manager Gary Spurgeon.

== On-air personalities ==
- Brenda Savelli
- Cassiday
- Joe Christopher
- John Tesh
- Jim Brickhan
- Joe Cortese
- Roula Christie
- Kid Kelly
