= WTYD =

Radio station in Deltaville, Virginia

- Deltaville, Virginia; United States
- Broadcast area: Northern Neck
- Frequency: 92.3 MHz
- Branding: 92.3 The Tide

Programming
- Format: Adult album alternative

Ownership
- Owner: Local Voice Media Group; (Davis Media, LLC)
- Sister stations: WBQK; WXTG-FM

History
- First air date: 1999
- Call sign meaning: sounds like "Tide"

Technical information
- Licensing authority: FCC
- Facility ID: 86175
- Class: A
- ERP: 2,400 watts
- HAAT: 160 meters (520 ft)
- Transmitter coordinates: 37°29′37.5″N 76°26′28.8″W

Links
- Public license information: Public file; LMS
- Webcast: Listen live
- Website: tideradio.com

WTYD (92.3 FM) is an adult album alternative formatted broadcast radio station licensed to Deltaville, Virginia, serving the Northern Neck. WTYD is owned and operated by Local Voice Media Group.
