= WZTE =

Radio station in Union City, Pennsylvania

- Union City, Pennsylvania; United States
- Broadcast area: Erie, Pennsylvania; Corry, Pennsylvania; Meadville, Pennsylvania
- Frequency: 1530 kHz
- Branding: Talk Erie

Programming
- Format: Conservative talk radio
- Affiliations: Salem Radio Network; Townhall News

Ownership
- Owner: Inspiration Time, Inc.
- Sister stations: WCTL

History
- First air date: 1966 (as WHYP)
- Former call signs: WHYP (1966–1988); WRKT (1988–1990); WEHN (1990–1992); WFLP (1992–1993); WEYZ (1993–2004); WYNE (2004–2013); WMCE (2013–2017)

Technical information
- Licensing authority: FCC
- Facility ID: 26610
- Class: D
- Power: 4,800 watts day 250 watts critical hours
- Transmitter coordinates: 42°12′5.0″N 79°51′43.0″W
- Translator: 103.3 W277DS (Erie)

Links
- Public license information: Public file; LMS
- Webcast: Listen Live
- Website: talkerie.com

WZTE (1530 AM) is a broadcast radio station licensed to Union City, Pennsylvania, serving Erie County, Crawford County, and Warren County in Pennsylvania and Chautauqua County in New York. WZTE is owned and operated by Inspiration Time, Inc., with headquarters in Waterford, Pennsylvania.

== History ==
The station first signed on the air as WHYP on September 5, 1966, founded by James D. Brownyard.

It was joined less than two years later by its like-named sister station, WHYP-FM (now WRKT), operating at 100.9. Like many co-owned FM stations of the era, it simulcast its AM sister during the daytime and provided local radio service after the AM station left the air after local sunset. Those hours of operation continue today for WZTE, as AM 1530 is a clear channel reserved for WCKY at night.

In January 1989, both WHYP-AM-FM were sold to Rambaldo Communications and went "All Beatles' with album sides until Rocket 101/1530 Launched in June 1989.

Previous logo.

Mercyhurst University commenced on a purchase of WYNE on March 30, 2005 from Corry Communications, Inc.

On September 1, 2017, Mercyhurst University sold the then-WMCE to Inspiration Time, Inc., the owners of Christian radio station WCTL, for $30,000. It was presumed that the station would begin airing a religious format, while the format then on the station would move to FM 100.9 after the sale. Following the sale, the station changed its call sign to WZTE, after which the station had remained silent, except for a brief period in September 2018 when the station signed back on to maintain its license.

In December 2018, the station returned to air, with its city of license shifted to Union City. The station began testing and stunting as Freedom 1530—carrying a mix of patriotic music, along with readings of the United States Constitution by recent high school graduates, and readings of Christmas messages from U.S. presidents.

The station ended program testing January 2, 2019, at 3:30 PM and launched TalkErie.com, a news/talk radio format. Daily satellite programming includes talk show hosts originating from the Salem Radio Network, along with a locally-originated afternoon program hosted by Erie veteran broadcaster and WZTE Station Manager Joel Natalie. The station also airs local newscasts twice per hour weekdays.
