= WFMD =

- Frederick, Maryland; United States
- Broadcast area: Central Maryland; Hagerstown metropolitan area
- Frequency: 930 kHz
- Branding: Free Talk 930 WFMD

Programming
- Language: English
- Format: News/talk and sports radio
- Affiliations: Compass Media Networks; Fox News Radio; Fox Sports Radio; Maryland Terrapins; Premiere Networks; Salem Radio Network; WestStar TalkRadio Network; Westwood One

Ownership
- Owner: Local Daily Media; (Davis Media, LLC)
- Sister stations: WFRE

History
- First air date: January 1, 1936
- Former frequencies: 900 kHz (1936–1941)
- Call sign meaning: "Frederick, Maryland"

Technical information
- Licensing authority: FCC
- Facility ID: 31136
- Class: B
- Power: 5,000 watts (day); 2,500 watts (night)
- Transmitter coordinates: 39°24′55.4″N 77°27′39.9″W

Links
- Public license information: Public file; LMS
- Webcast: Listen live
- Website: www.wfmd.com

WFMD (930 kHz, "Free Talk 930 WFMD") is a commercial news/talk and sports radio–formatted broadcast AM radio station licensed to Frederick, Maryland, and serving the Central Maryland and Hagerstown metropolitan area. WFMD is owned and operated by Local Daily Media.

== History ==
The station signed on the air on New Year's Day, 1936.

In the mid-80s, WFMD added C-QUAM AM stereo.

== Sale ==
WFMD, along with its sister station WFRE, were put into a trust by owner Clear Channel Communications with the intention to sell the stations in August 2008.

On March 27, 2019, Connoisseur Media announced that it would acquire WFMD and WFRE from the Aloha Station Trust in exchange for transferring its cluster in Erie, Pennsylvania, to iHeartMedia (the former Clear Channel). The sale closed on May 20, 2019. On July 24, 2024, Connoisseur announced a sale of WFMD and WFRE to Local Daily Media, owner of WTYD and WBQK as well as a local news site serving Williamsburg, Virginia. The sale closed on October 1.
