= WFRE =

Country music radio station in Frederick, Maryland

Coordinates: 39.500°N 77.499°W

- Frederick, Maryland; United States
- Broadcast area: Central Maryland; Western Maryland; South Central Pennsylvania; Northern Virginia; Eastern Panhandle of West Virginia
- Frequency: 99.9 MHz
- RDS: PI: 639a; PS: Title by Artist on 99.9 WFRE FM; RT: Now Playing: Artist on 99.9 WFRE
- Branding: Free Country 99.9 WFRE

Programming
- Language: English
- Format: Country music
- Subchannels: HD2: WFMD simulcast (News–talk–sports)
- Affiliations: Compass Media Networks; Westwood One

Ownership
- Owner: Local Daily Media; (Davis Media, LLC)
- Sister stations: WFMD

History
- First air date: February 19, 1961
- Former call signs: WFMD-FM (1961–1969)
- Call sign meaning: Frederick

Technical information
- Licensing authority: FCC
- Facility ID: 31139
- Class: B
- ERP: 7,600 watts
- HAAT: 355 meters (1,165 ft)

Links
- Public license information: Public file; LMS
- Webcast: Listen live
- Website: www.wfre.com

WFRE (99.9 MHz) is a commercial radio station located in Frederick, Maryland. It plays country music and is owned by Local Daily Media along with its sister station 930 WFMD. Despite the station being located approximately 45 miles (72 km) from the two closest major cities (Baltimore, Maryland, and Washington, D.C.), its signal reaches both markets.

In November 1992, WFRE changed their format from easy listening to the current country format.

In 2007, Clear Channel Communications was required to spin off stations to comply with ownership limits. WFRE and WFMD were placed in a divestiture trust while Clear Channel sought a buyer.

On March 27, 2019, Connoisseur Media announced that it would acquire WFRE and WFMD from the Aloha Station Trust in exchange for transferring its cluster. in Erie, Pennsylvania, to iHeartMedia (the former Clear Channel). The sale closed on May 20. On July 24, 2024, Connoisseur announced a sale of WFMD and WFRE to Local Daily Media, owner of WTYD and WBQK as well as a local news site serving Williamsburg, Virginia. The sale closed on October 1.
