= Aloha Station Trust =

Privately owned divestiture trust for former Clear Channel Communications radio stations

Aloha Station Trust, LLC was a privately owned trust company that owned radio and television stations previously owned by Clear Channel Communications, forerunner of the modern iHeartMedia.

After Clear Channel was acquired by private equity interests in 2007, Clear Channel sold off media outlets to comply with FCC ownership limits that would no longer be grandfathered to them. Many stations agreed to be sold, or have been sold, to companies like Frequency License LLC, Providence Equity Partners, Cumulus Media, Blue Point Media and Santa Barbara Community Broadcasting.

Jeanette Tully, a director of Journal Communications Inc., was initially the sole member of the trust until her death in 2018. After that, Barry Drake, formerly of Backyard Broadcasting and Sinclair Broadcast Group, took over trusteeship of the Aloha Station Trust and two other iHeartMedia divestiture trusts. The trust was dissolved in 2021 following the divestiture of its last station in December of that year.
