= WUTV =

Television station in Buffalo, New York

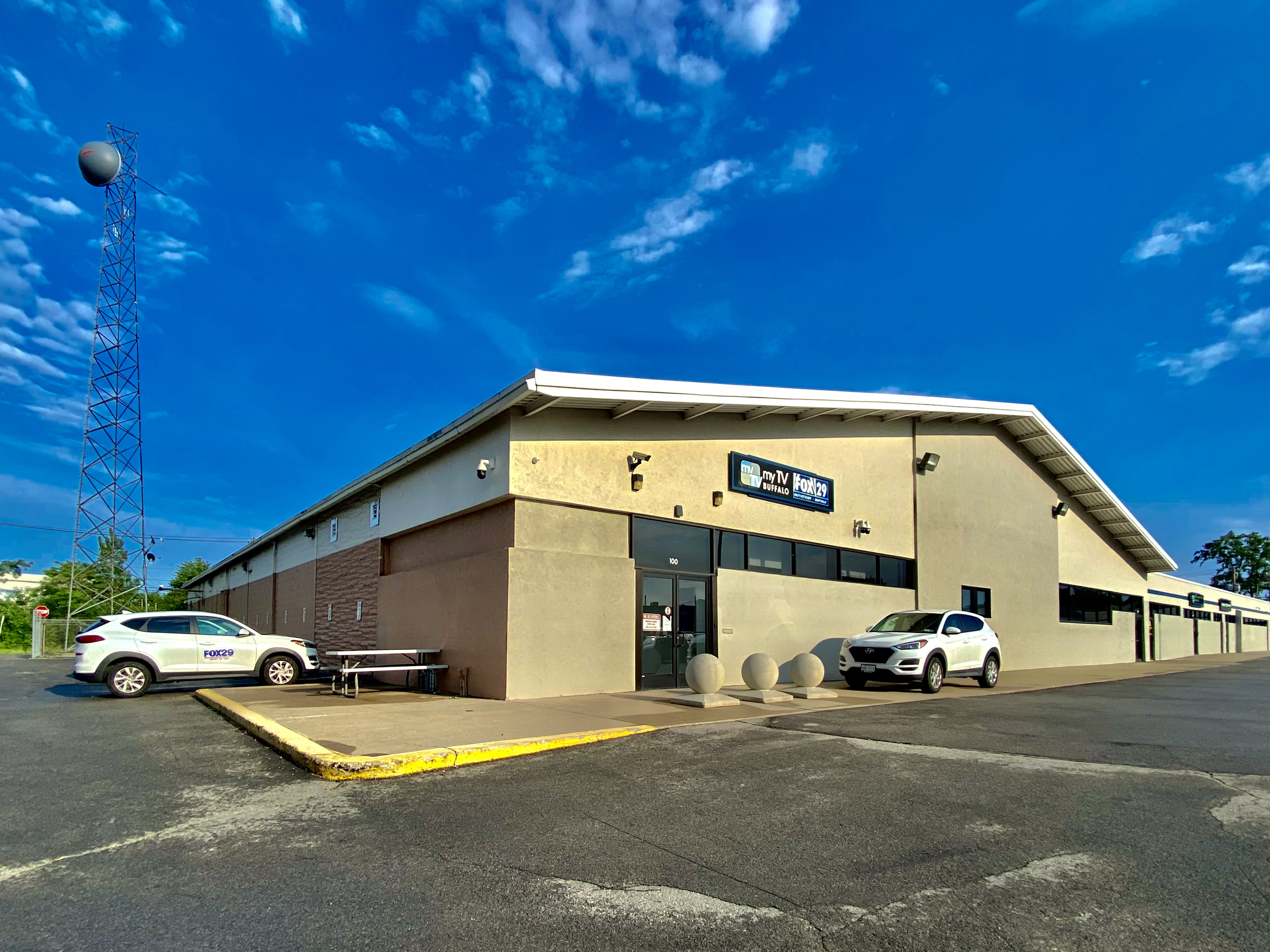
- The WUTV and WNYO studios in North Buffalo as seen in June 2022
- Buffalo, New York; United States
- Channels: Digital: 32 (UHF); Virtual: 29
- Branding: Fox 29

Programming
- Affiliations: 29.1: Fox; 29.2: Roar; 29.3: Charge!

Ownership
- Owner: Sinclair Broadcast Group; (WUTV Licensee, LLC)
- Sister stations: WNYO-TV

History
- First air date: December 21, 1970
- Former channel numbers: Analog: 29 (UHF, 1970–2009); Digital: 14 (UHF, until 2019)
- Former affiliations: Independent (1970–1986, 1989–1990); UPN (secondary, 1995–1998)
- Call sign meaning: Ultravision, founding owner

Technical information
- Licensing authority: FCC
- Facility ID: 415
- ERP: 1,000 kW
- HAAT: 329 m (1,079 ft)
- Transmitter coordinates: 43°1′32.2″N 78°55′42.1″W

Links
- Public license information: Public file; LMS
- Website: wutv29.com

WUTV (channel 29) is a television station in Buffalo, New York, United States, affiliated with the Fox network. It is owned by Sinclair Broadcast Group alongside WNYO-TV (channel 49), an independent station with MyNetworkTV. The two stations share studios on Hertel Avenue near Military Road in Buffalo; WUTV's transmitter is located on Whitehaven Road (near I-190) in Grand Island, New York, behind its former main studio building.

After a years-long permit fight, WUTV began broadcasting on December 21, 1970, as Buffalo's first modern independent station. It was built by Ultravision Broadcasting Company, a group of local investors. In addition to its broadcast in the Buffalo area, it was widely available in the adjacent Golden Horseshoe region of Ontario, including the Greater Toronto Area, with its broadcast signal and on cable television systems. Under the ownership of Philip Lombardo's Citadel Communications, WUTV became a Fox affiliate when the network launched in 1986, but it was an underperforming affiliate and struggled with ratings issues stemming from the duplication of Fox programming on Canadian stations. The network agreed to move its affiliation to channel 49, then a competing independent known as WNYB-TV. However, by the time the network moved, Act III Broadcasting had already agreed to buy WUTV and the programming inventory of WNYB, which had lost money under the ownership of the Buffalo Sabres hockey team and lacked the Canadian cable carriage that channel 29 enjoyed. The two stations combined as WUTV on July 27, 1990, and the station continued to televise Sabres games for several years.

Sinclair bought WUTV in 1998 as part of its purchase of the Sullivan Broadcasting group and WNYO-TV in 2001. While Fox stations elsewhere added 10 p.m. local newscasts, WUTV did not; it had a strong franchise in that time period with syndicated reruns. Instead, WNLO (channel 23) launched the market's dominant 10 p.m. newscast in 2001, while Sinclair's ventures into Buffalo newscasts aired on WNYO. In 2013, the newscast produced for that station by WGRZ moved to channel 29, where its ratings increased. After eight years, Sinclair replaced the WGRZ newscast with an in-house program utilizing resources at other Sinclair stations in Upstate New York, which was canceled in 2023 due to continued low ratings.

== History ==
=== Development and predecessors ===
In 1955, Frontier Television Inc. obtained a construction permit for channel 59. Channel 59 had previously been home to WBES-TV, which had closed in December 1953 after less than three months of operation. Seeking a lower-frequency channel, the company successfully petitioned the Federal Communications Commission (FCC) to allow the assignment of channel 29, originally allocated to Niagara Falls, Ontario; the Canadian government did not object. Frontier had hoped to operate from shared studios with and donated equipment from WBUF (channel 17), which NBC had just moved into new facilities; the company claimed that much of the equipment for channel 17 was adaptable for channel 29 but not the higher channel 59. When its plans for a UHF station failed, Frontier instead sought to have another VHF channel assigned to the city.

Channel 29 was unused when Ultravision Broadcasting Company filed for channel 29 on May 28, 1963, proposing an independent station. Ultravision's partners were Stan Jasinski, director of Polish programming at Buffalo radio station WWOL (who at the time was also about to launch AM station WMMJ), and Florian Burczynski, who ran a bakery company. WEBR Inc., a subsidiary of the Buffalo Courier-Express newspaper, also filed for the channel, prompting the Federal Communications Commission (FCC) to order a comparative hearing on the applications' merits on December 27, 1963. Much of the debate between the applicants centered on their financial qualifications to build and run their proposed stations, while Ultravision also contended that awarding a permit to the Courier-Express would increase media concentration. The FCC then halted the proceedings while it considered its rules around financial requirements for new station owners. At the time, the commission required applicants to show they could operate for three months and make loan and interest payments for a full year without any revenue. However, in March 1965, the FCC changed this rule so that, in cities with three network-affiliated VHF stations like Buffalo, applicants needed to have the necessary funds to keep stations on the air for three years. After hearings in late 1965 and early 1966, FCC examiner Basil P. Cooper issued an initial decision favoring Ultravision for the channel 29 permit on August 26, 1966. Key to his finding was that Ultravision was just as financially qualified as WEBR, had better integration of ownership and management, and had a preference on media diversification. He dismissed a charge by WEBR as to Jasinski's character in his dealings with Rosary Hill College and noted that WEBR had failed to inform the FCC of its interest in a cable television system in Buffalo. WEBR appealed the ruling but lost at the FCC's review board, the commission itself, and the United States Court of Appeals for the District of Columbia Circuit.

Ultravision selected a site on Grand Island for its facility; ground was broken on the studios in August, and erection of a 959-foot (292 m) tower began in October.

=== Early years ===
WUTV made its first broadcast on December 21, 1970, from a partially completed studio building. It was the first new Buffalo TV station since WKBW-TV began on channel 7 in 1958. It offered classic TV shows, movies, and sports programs. Though a variety of local series were also planned, the departure of WUTV's original station manager within weeks of its launch forced a reevaluation of those plans. First to debut was a local edition of the children's show franchise Romper Room in March.

As a new Buffalo station, WUTV was also of interest in Southern Ontario, where the existing Buffalo stations were available over-the-air and on cable. Its power levels were comparable to WNED-TV (channel 17), and its signal was described as better than any other Buffalo station by Jack Miller of The Hamilton Spectator. It was at first uncertain whether WUTV would gain access to Canadian cable systems, since the number of available stations would mean that some Ontario cable companies would seek to drop CKVR-TV of Barrie, Ontario, and Canadian Radio and Television Commission (CRTC) president Pierre Juneau was reticent to let them do so. In Toronto, Rogers Cable began offering WUTV to its subscribers on March 5, 1973. Ultravision sold WUTV to Whitehaven Entertainment Corporation, a group of Boston investors including general manager Herman Pease, in 1977. Whitehaven increased its spending on programming, added network programs not being aired by local affiliates, and considered broadcasting prime time subscription television on channel 29.

In [Lombardo's] hands, WUTV was nothing more than a moneymaker. He seemed more concerned with serving Canadian viewers than Buffalo viewers. Indeed, much of his revenue came from north of the border.

— Alan Pergament, The Buffalo News

Whitehaven sold WUTV to Citadel Communications, a Bronxville-based company owned by Philip Lombardo, for $15.2 million in 1984. Lombardo exercised significant cost cuts at channel 29, automating station operations and eliminating a third of its staff; though he considered adding a local newscast, original expectations that this would come in 1985 did not pan out, and by 1987 the plan had been written off by station management as financially infeasible. WUTV signed to become an affiliate of Fox in September 1986, making it among the last top-50 markets where the network secured an outlet.

=== Competition and merger with WNYB-TV ===
Buffalo gained a competing independent station on September 1, 1987, when Aud Enterprises, a subsidiary of the Buffalo Sabres hockey team, put WNYB-TV (channel 49) on the air, purchasing the permit from TVX Broadcast Group. Fox and WUTV had a falling out in 1989 over the network's alleged underperformance in Buffalo compared to other markets. Another concern was that CHCH-TV in Hamilton, Ontario, aired Fox programming as well. Channel 29 believed this caused unnecessary duplication because of the proximity of Hamilton to Buffalo and CHCH's presence on Buffalo-area cable systems. Additionally, CHCH was able to invoke simultaneous substitution of WUTV during Fox programs it carried, cutting into channel 29's ability to sell advertising to its large Canadian audience. Fox moved its programming to WNYB-TV effective September 1, 1989; it did not have the Canadian cable carriage of WUTV and did not depend financially on advertising revenue from Canada. While WNYB-TV was the new Fox affiliate, leaving WUTV to again become an independent, channel 49 was also losing an average of $1 million a year. In contrast, WUTV made money off its ability to sell advertising to Canadian viewers, at the expense of local service to Buffalo.

On August 29, 1989, Act III Broadcasting announced that it would buy WUTV along with WNYB-TV's programming and Fox affiliation, which would move to channel 29. Simultaneously, the Sabres announced that channel 49's transmitting facility would be sold to Tri-State Christian Television (TCT) of Marion, Illinois. In exchange, Sabres owners Seymour Knox and Robert Swados received equity in WUTV and would move their road games from channel 49 to channel 29, where they would have the exposure on Canadian cable systems that WNYB-TV had lacked since launching. The pair of deals would together reimburse the Sabres for their losses in running WNYB-TV. Approval of this set of transactions was not certain since Act III already owned WUHF in Rochester. Both stations' signals overlapped in Orleans and Genesee counties, and the overlap was large enough that Act III could not buy WNYB-TV without an FCC waiver. In a letter seeking such a waiver, Act III billed the deal as a "consolidation" of WUTV and WNYB-TV. Act III argued that the Buffalo market could not support what were essentially two independent stations (Note: Fox affiliates continued to be considered independent stations for a number of years after Fox launched, particularly as Fox did not program a full seven-night schedule early on. The Fox owned-and-operated stations did not leave the trade association for independent stations, INTV, until 1992.) due to its "fiercely competitive nature" and the difficulties of UHF broadcasting. It also faced objections from commercial stations WIVB-TV (channel 4) in Buffalo and WROC-TV in Rochester, as well as Stevens Media Services of Buffalo, which decried the monopolizing of the UHF television market and took issue with the overlap between the stations.

In June 1990, the FCC approved the WUTV sale to Act III, granting a one-year waiver to Act III to allow it to sell off WUHF; it had already granted the WNYB-TV sale to TCT in November 1989. WNYB-TV's programming, including Fox shows, was immediately merged onto WUTV's schedule, and TCT took over channel 49 on June 28, 1990, airing Christian ministry programming. WNYB-TV's general manager took over operations of WUTV. Channel 29 continued to air 30 Sabres games a season through 1994, when the deal was cut back to 10 games a year because of increased prime time programming from Fox. That year, after Fox gained rights to telecast NFL football, the CRTC authorized wider distribution of Fox affiliates in Canada, with WUTV appearing for a time on lineups in Ottawa and Montreal. (Note: WUTV was removed from Montreal in 1997 when WFFF-TV went on the air in Burlington, Vermont. It was removed from the Ottawa market in 2003 when Rogers switched from the Rochester ABC, CBS, and NBC affiliates and WUTV to Detroit affiliates.) The station became a secondary affiliate of UPN when it launched in January 1995; Star Trek: Voyager aired on Thursday nights and other UPN shows on Saturday afternoons. WUTV remained the UPN affiliate until 1998, when the network moved to a primary affiliation with WNGS (channel 67).

WUTV continued to underperform the average Fox affiliate. In May 1994, the rating for Fox programs in Buffalo was 30 percent below the national average, and it underperformed the national ratings for Fox Kids cartoons. New World Communications eyed a possible purchase of WIVB, the CBS affiliate, to convert to a Fox affiliate.

=== Sullivan and Sinclair ownership ===
In 1995, Act III was acquired by ABRY Broadcast Partners; the Boston buyout firm named Dan Sullivan, president of the TV division of Clear Channel Communications, to run Sullivan Broadcasting, a joint venture with ABRY to manage the former Act III portfolio. Sinclair Broadcast Group acquired WUTV as part of its purchase of Sullivan in 1998; Sinclair then bought WNYO-TV (the former WNYB-TV) in 2001, creating a duopoly with WUTV.

Over time, the importance of Canadian viewership and revenue to WUTV declined, though sources estimated the station still garnered a quarter of its advertising revenue from Canada in 2013, and the Buffalo operation was regarded as highly profitable. In some cases, syndicators bypassed WUTV for programming because they wanted to sell the rights separately in Toronto; the rights to Modern Family were sold to Sinclair for air on WNYO, which has less Canadian coverage, to protect the Toronto station that had also acquired the program.

== Newscasts ==
Historically, WUTV did not air local news programming. Though the concept of a 10 p.m. newscast had been contemplated going back to the 1980s, WUTV developed a successful franchise in the 10 p.m. hour with syndicated reruns, by 2000 of Seinfeld and Frasier, and had no interest in starting a newscast. As a result, the first 10 p.m. newscasts in the Buffalo market debuted not on WUTV but on WPXJ-TV (produced by WGRZ) and WNLO (produced by WIVB) in January 2001. The WNLO–WIVB newscast benefited from stronger promotion and more integrated management and beat the WPXJ–WGRZ effort—but both newscasts combined, a year after their debuts, did not attract as many viewers as Seinfeld on WUTV. The WPXJ–WGRZ newscast was canceled in 2003, and that year, Sinclair Buffalo announced plans for a newscast—on WNYO. That newscast, utilizing the resources of Sinclair's News Central, debuted on August 16, 2004. It was discontinued at the end of March 2006 and replaced by a local news-and-sports block produced by WGRZ.

On April 8, 2013, the WGRZ newscast moved to WUTV and expanded from five nights a week to seven, with the Seinfeld reruns—declining in ratings—moving to WNYO. Station management hoped that the stronger lead-in of Fox network programming would increase the ratings of their newscast, which still trailed WNLO. WNLO's newscast still led; though WUTV surpassed WNLO in one 2017 survey, WNLO was back on top by 2020.

After eight years of carrying another station's newscast, Sinclair moved in 2021 to staff up its own Buffalo newsroom of 10 multimedia journalists. The newscast debuted on July 1, 2021; it used resources from other Sinclair-owned stations in the state of New York, with its anchors based out of WSTM-TV in Syracuse and its weather and sports segments produced from WHAM-TV in Rochester. The program failed to make much of a ratings impression; in the November 2022 sweeps period, the WIVB–WNLO newscast attracted four times as many viewers. As a result, Sinclair discontinued it effective January 27, 2023, with Sinclair's national news service, The National Desk, airing in its stead. Four people lost their jobs: a news director, two reporters, and a photographer.

== Technical information ==
WUTV's transmitter is located on Whitehaven Road (near I-190) in Grand Island, New York. The station's signal is multiplexed:

Subchannels of WUTV
Subchannel	Res.	Short name	Programming
29.1	720p	WUTVFOX	Fox
29.2	480i	ROAR	Roar (4:3)
29.3	480i	Charge!	Charge! (4:3)
49.1	720p	WNYO-MY	WNYO-TV (Independent with MyNetworkTV)

Broadcast on behalf of another station

WUTV ended regular programming on its analog signal, over UHF channel 29, on the original digital television transition date of February 17, 2009. The station's digital signal remained on its pre-transition UHF channel 14 until being repacked on July 29, 2019.
