= WIVB-TV =

Television station in Buffalo, New York

- Buffalo–Niagara Falls, New York; United States
- City: Buffalo, New York
- Channels: Digital: 36 (UHF), shared with WNLO; Virtual: 4
- Branding: WIVB 4; News 4

Programming
- Affiliations: 4.1: CBS; 4.2: Cozi TV

Ownership
- Owner: Nexstar Media Group; (Nexstar Media Inc.)
- Sister stations: WNLO; Tegna: WGRZ

History
- First air date: May 14, 1948
- Former call signs: WBEN-TV (1948–1977)
- Former channel numbers: Analog: 4 (VHF, 1948–2009); Digital: 39 (UHF, until 2018), 32 (UHF, 2018–2019)
- Former affiliations: NBC (primary 1948–1949, secondary 1949–1954); DuMont (secondary, 1948–1955); ABC (secondary, 1948–1956); United (secondary, 1967)
- Call sign meaning: "IV" (Roman numeral 4) "Buffalo"

Technical information
- Licensing authority: FCC
- Facility ID: 7780
- ERP: 800 kW
- HAAT: 415 m (1,362 ft)
- Transmitter coordinates: 42°39′33″N 78°37′32″W

Links
- Public license information: Public file; LMS
- Website: www.wivb.com

WIVB-TV (channel 4) is a television station in Buffalo, New York, United States, affiliated with CBS. It is owned by Nexstar Media Group alongside CW station WNLO (channel 23); Nexstar's Tegna subsidiary owns NBC affiliate WGRZ (channel 2). WIVB-TV and WNLO share studios on Elmwood Avenue in North Buffalo; through a channel sharing agreement, the two stations transmit using WNLO's spectrum from a tower in Colden, New York.

== History ==
An early WBEN-TV identification card.

The station first signed on the air on May 14, 1948, as WBEN-TV. It was the first television station in Buffalo, New York, and the fifth-oldest station in New York state. The station was originally owned by the Butler family, along with the Buffalo Evening News and WBEN radio (930 AM and 106.5 FM, now WBKV at 102.5); the holding company for the WBEN stations was WBEN, Inc. Its radio sister had been one of CBS Radio's first 16 affiliates when that network premiered in 1928, but by 1948 had switched networks to NBC Blue. Accordingly, channel 4 originally signed on as an NBC television affiliate, and with it aired The Howdy Doody Show, a show hosted by local native Bob Smith, who had spent the past few years at WBEN radio before departing for national television. WBEN-TV picked up CBS programming in January 1949.

As the only station in Buffalo for its first several years, channel 4 also carried secondary affiliations with ABC and DuMont. It lost NBC when WGR-TV (channel 2, now WGRZ) signed on in August 1954, and ABC to WGR-TV when NBC moved its programs to newly purchased WBUF-TV (channel 17) in 1956. WBEN-TV continued to share DuMont programming with WGR-TV until 1956 when that network ceased operations. It operated from studios on the 18th floor of the Statler Hotel until 1960, when it moved to its current facilities on Elmwood Avenue. That studio—expanded by the WBEN stations—had originally been built for WBUF-TV, which had gone dark in 1958, two months before the sign-on of present-day ABC affiliate WKBW-TV (channel 7).

One early show running from the late 1940s until 1970 was Meet the Millers, a weekday afternoon series featuring Bill and Mildred Miller providing cooking and household tips. Two educational local shows aimed toward children were the hour-long Fun to Learn consisting of 15-minute segments which taught various subjects including the language of Spanish at 5 p.m. weekdays and the half-hour Your Museum of Science, which featured the curator of the Buffalo Museum of Science on Saturday mornings. Another staple throughout the 1950s and early 1960s was a short visit to the North Pole with Santa Claus and Forgetful the Elf. This was a daily show that aired only during December and was sponsored by Hengerer's Department Store. On September 23, 1977, the then-newly-renamed WIVB took over production of the public-access cable television program Disco Step by Step. In April 1976, the station signed a sister station agreement with Hokuriku Broadcasting from Kanazawa in central Japan.

When the Federal Communications Commission (FCC) disallowed same market co-ownership of newspapers and broadcast licenses in the early 1970s, the combination of the Buffalo Evening News and WBEN-AM-FM-TV was grandfathered under the new rule. However, the 1974 death of Katherine Butler (longtime owner and publisher of the Evening News) led to the placement of the Evening News' properties in a blind trust (since Butler left no heirs). This trust company then sold the newspaper to Berkshire Hathaway in 1977. This sale brought an end to 101 years of Butler family ownership of the Evening News. With the loss of the WBEN stations' grandfathered protection, Berkshire Hathaway opted to keep the newspaper and sell off the broadcasting properties. WBEN-TV was sold to newspaper publisher Robert Howard of Oceanside, California, for $25.5 million. The new owner, whose company was called Howard Publications, Inc., changed channel 4's callsign to WIVB-TV, which stands for "We're Channel IV (Roman numeral 4) Buffalo", on November 1, 1977, the day after he purchased the station. The call-letter change was triggered due to an FCC regulation at the time prohibiting TV and radio stations in the same city, but with different owners, from sharing the same call letters. The WBEN callsign remains on 930 AM, which along with its FM sister station had been sold to Larry Levite's Algonquin Broadcasting (WBEN is now owned by Audacy; the FM station, now WBKV, is owned by K-Love). Channel 4 was then sold to King World Productions (at that time a separate entity from both Viacom and CBS; the two would later split and remerge) for $100 million in 1988.

In the late 1970s, WBEN/WIVB ended up playing an early role in the emerging cable television industry. Their satellite uplink facility, initiated by general manager Les Arries in 1976, uplinked sporting events for worldwide distribution, and was used to transmit American TV programming into Canada until Canadian authorities put an end to this practice. Warner-Amex Satellite Entertainment then began leasing the uplink facility to transmit the signals of their then-new cable networks Nickelodeon and The Movie Channel (originally known as Star Channel). Both networks moved to an uplink facility in Hauppauge, New York, by the end of 1981, after Warner-Amex was unable to reach a deal with WIVB's ownership over a planned expansion of the facility to handle uplinking and studio programming for their new music video channel MTV.

WIVB-TV nearly dropped its CBS affiliation and became an NBC affiliate in 1994, when King World put itself up for sale (NBC parent company General Electric's announced purchase of the company never materialized). After attempts by Westinghouse Broadcasting (whose parent company would later purchase CBS), New World Communications (to make the station a Fox affiliate), Tribune Broadcasting (to make a station a WB affiliate), Paramount Stations Group (to make a station a UPN affiliate), and E. W. Scripps Company (to make the station an ABC affiliate), to purchase the station fell through, WIVB-TV was sold to LIN TV Corporation (which would later take the name LIN Media) in 1995; King World was acquired by CBS in 2000 and has since been absorbed into Paramount Global's CBS Media Ventures unit, while E. W. Scripps would later acquire rival WKBW in 2014 and, ironically, WIVB's current parent Nexstar would later acquire Tribune in 2019. The new owner renewed the station's CBS affiliation through a long-term contract; it was renewed in 2014, along with most of the rest of the contracts for LIN's CBS affiliates, and will expire at an unknown date. As a result of the cancellation of the deal, Buffalo was one of the few NFL markets that was not affected by the affiliation switches. At the time of the aborted NBC purchase, WIVB-TV's viewership was in a strong second place in the local ratings, while NBC's existing affiliate WGRZ-TV was in third place, although not as distant as it had been throughout much of the 1980s and early 1990s. Both stations have since passed then-first-place WKBW-TV.

WIVB-TV gained the local rights to the Buffalo Bills from WGRZ-TV in 1998, when the American Football Conference package moved to CBS. WGRZ-TV had aired most Bills games since 1965. Van Miller, channel 4's longtime sports director, was the Bills' play-by-play announcer from 1960 to 2003, except for a brief time in the 1970s when WKBW radio was the flagship. However, beginning in 2014 with the introduction of "cross-flex" scheduling, the NFL started arbitrarily moving select Bills games to WUTV, the local Fox affiliate.

In 2000, LIN bought the station then known as WNEQ-TV, the market's secondary PBS member station. On January 23, 2001, WNEQ-TV was relaunched as independent station WNLO; that station became a UPN affiliate in 2002. The previous UPN stations, WNGS/WONS, later switched to the Retro Television Network and were eventually sold to the Daystar Television Network (Daystar has since sold WNGS, which today serves as Buffalo's MeTV and This TV affiliate under new call letters WBBZ-TV). In September 2006, WNLO became Buffalo's CW affiliate. On May 18, 2007, LIN announced that it was exploring strategic alternatives that could have resulted in the sale of the company; such a sale would not materialize until March 21, 2014, when it announced a merger with Media General. The merger was completed on December 19, bringing WIVB-TV and WNLO under common ownership with ABC affiliate WTEN and the same management as Fox affiliate WXXA-TV in Albany; because Media General is part-owned by Warren Buffett, the merger also brought WIVB back under co-ownership with The Buffalo News, as Buffett's Berkshire Hathaway owns that newspaper, and the newspaper-broadcast cross-ownership ban has since been lifted. The two entities remain operated separately. Media General later merged with Nexstar Broadcasting Group to form Nexstar Media Group.

Nexstar acquired WGRZ owner Tegna in a deal announced in August 2025 and completed on March 19, 2026. The deal included approval for Nexstar to own three station licenses in markets such as Buffalo.

== Programming ==
WIVB-TV currently airs no local non-news programming, except for the public affairs program By the People, which has been a staple of its programming on Sundays at 6 a.m. for many decades.

Under LIN ownership, WIVB (and LIN's other CBS affiliates in markets where the company owned a station duopoly) did not broadcast CBS Saturday Morning nor (in most cases) the weekend editions of the CBS Evening News, broadcasting extended hour-long local evening newscasts on Saturdays and Sundays instead. Sister station WNLO aired the weekend editions of the CBS Evening News, but, unlike most LIN duopoly stations in this scenario, did not carry CBS This Morning Saturday as it is committed to The CW's Saturday morning block (currently One Magnificent Morning). As an exception, if CBS Sports programming ran into the 6:30 p.m. half-hour on weekends, local news would air from 6 to 7 on WNLO, and the abbreviated network newscast, if any, might air on WIVB-TV.

In fall 2015, WIVB, now under Media General ownership, began to consistently carry both CBS This Morning Saturday and the weekend editions of the CBS Evening News.

On the numerous occasions that CBS' coverage of the men's final of the US Open tennis tournament was pushed back from Sunday to Monday afternoon (and occasionally other sports coverage held over to weekdays), WIVB-TV delegated this coverage to WNLO to air its regular local and syndicated programming. If necessary due to the length of the match, WIVB-TV simulcasted coverage during the usual CBS Evening News timeslot and took over coverage fully once WNLO began airing CW programming at 8 pm. The station did carry the final in full in 2013, when it was scheduled for Monday instead of Sunday from the outset. This arrangement ended in 2015 when ESPN became the exclusive carrier of the tournament.

As part of the team's new regional media deal with Nexstar, Buffalo Bills preseason broadcasts moved to WIVB in 2021 (the move was originally scheduled for 2020 before the NFL canceled its 2020 preseason due to COVID-19 concerns). The contract took effect across Nexstar's other stations in the Bills' market in 2018. WIVB also serves as the broadcast home for select games of the Buffalo Bandits of the National Lacrosse League, sharing the rights with WNLO.

=== News operation ===
WIVB-TV presently broadcasts 37 hours of locally produced newscasts each week (with six hours each weekday and 3 1/2 hours each on Saturdays and Sundays). In addition, the station produces an additional 18 1/2 hours of newscasts weekly for WNLO (with 3 1/2 hours on weekdays, and a half-hour each on Saturdays and Sundays). This totals 55 1/2 hours of newscasts on a weekly basis between the two stations; in regards to the number of hours devoted to news programming, it is the highest local newscast output among all broadcast television stations in the Buffalo market (in contrast, WGRZ produces 30 1/2 hours and WKBW-TV produces 24 1/2 hours of newscasts each week).

Appropriately for a station with roots in a newspaper, WIVB-TV has a strong news tradition. WBEN-TV was the early news leader in Buffalo until approximately 1972, when (briefly) WGR-TV and then (more long-term) WKBW-TV overtook it. Channel 4 then spent most of the next 30 years as a solid, if usually distant, runner-up to WKBW-TV, well ahead of market laggard WGR-TV (later WGRZ). However, it was a major beneficiary of various changes (including WKBW-TV changing hands to a smaller company, aging of its news team, and general programming mistakes) at WKBW-TV in the mid-1990s. Most notably, it snagged local rights to The Oprah Winfrey Show from WKBW-TV in 1995. By 2000, after the retirement of WKBW-TV's longtime anchorman Irv Weinstein and weather anchor Tom Jolls – the last of the traditional "Irv, Rick and Tom" team at channel 7 – and Nielsen's adoption of market metering in Buffalo at the same time, WIVB-TV had taken over the number-one spot for the first time in over a quarter century. It remained number one for the next decade until a series of budget cuts, a retransmission consent dispute with Time Warner Cable, and the slow response to replace departing news anchors pushed most of its newscasts to second, behind WGRZ, who has since also come under ownership of a major national media company. By 2013, WIVB-TV, despite producing the most hours of news content, had the smallest news staff of any of the three stations in the market, after WKBW-TV went on a hiring spree to boost its staff.

WIVB has long been considered to favor older viewers, even dating back to the 1970s when its rivals were promoting flashier, more sensational approaches to the news. Jacquie Walker, the station's lead co-anchor, has been with the station since 1984, the longest continuous run of any news anchor in the history of Buffalo television. Walker announced her retirement from the anchor desk in April 2024 as she moves into a senior correspondent role previously held by her former co-anchor Rich Newberg. The station frequently places significant emphasis on its weather operation. Don Paul spent nearly 30 years as WIVB's chief meteorologist before he was pushed into retirement in 2016; after a stint at WKBW, Nexstar reversed its decision and invited Paul back in a part-time position. The station's current chief meteorologist is Todd Santos, a former personality on The Weather Channel and NBC Weather Plus; another prominent meteorologist on the staff is Mike Cejka, who has been with WIVB since 1983. The station has also typically differed in its approach to hiring meteorologists in that none of them are Western New York natives (whereas WKBW and WGRZ hired mostly local personalities); Kaylee Wendt, the last meteorologist to have lived in western New York before arriving at WIVB, left the station in February 2019.

The news operation at WIVB-TV has historically favored a straight newscast, as opposed to the more activist approach of WGRZ (WIVB-TV highlighted this in an advertising campaign in the mid-2000s, when it used the slogan "today's news and tomorrow's weather" and asserted that it "doesn't take sides", a reference to WGRZ's use of the "On Your Side" slogan).

Since 1993, the station has produced an annual holiday promo featuring a custom version of Jolly Demis's "Christmas Time Again". The promos, featuring short snippets of the families of each member of the WIVB news team, have become a tradition in Western New York, long after most other stations discontinued using the song (only WIVB and KSAZ-TV in Phoenix, Arizona, still use it).

This station debuted a weekday morning newscast on September 19, 1994, known as Wake Up!. It was the second local broadcast in the market after WKBW-TV's Good Morning Western New York, which launched in 1987. Unlike the WKBW-TV broadcast, which was (and remains) a weekday-only program, Wake Up! has aired seven days a week from its inception, with a two-hour version (originally only one hour from 1994 to January 2013) airing on Saturdays and Sundays. (The weekend edition was originally co-anchored by Chuck Gurney, the first openly gay television personality in the Buffalo market.) During the mid-1990s, WIVB-TV used the 24 Hour News Source format, which had previously been used earlier in the decade on WGRZ-TV. In March 2001, WIVB-TV began airing a nightly 10 p.m. newscast on WNLO known as The 10 O'Clock News. During the week, this program competes with WGRZ-TV's prime time newscast that currently airs on Fox affiliate WUTV (and previously ran on WPXJ-TV and WNYO-TV); WNLO has led the ratings race at 10 p.m. ever since the program's debut.

Starting on February 2, 2009, WNLO began airing a two-hour extension of WIVB-TV's weekday morning newscast. It has since cut the extended morning show by an hour to make room for a partially brokered local talk show. It also rebroadcasts WIVB-TV's weekend morning newscast and may air the hour-long weekend 6 p.m. newscasts which normally air on WIVB-TV, if CBS Sports programming runs over into the timeslot.

WIVB-TV began broadcasting its newscasts in true high definition on February 1, 2012. It was the last of the television stations in the Buffalo market to upgrade its news programming to HD; WKBW-TV had done so in 2011, and WGRZ aired some HD content as early as February 2010. The 10 p.m. newscast on WNLO was included in the upgrade.

From approximately 1995 until the end of 2009, WIVB-TV built and operated a large network of over eighty AWS/WeatherBug weather stations (under the name "Neighborhood WeatherNet"), mostly at local schools. WIVB-TV's involvement in the Neighborhood WeatherNet was discontinued at the beginning of 2010, though the stations, now under WeatherBug's control, remain operational. In 2020, WIVB signed on with the New York State Mesonet, a state-operated weather station network. WIVB-TV also previously operated a local Doppler radar in the 1990s and early 2000s (known as "4 × 4 Warn Doppler" because it factored in stations in Rochester, Syracuse and Cleveland), but shut it down in the early 2000s in favor of using data from the nearby National Weather Service Doppler Radar in Cheektowaga.

WIVB-TV ended its separate sports segments in March 2015 and integrated sports reports into the regular newscasts. The sportscasts returned under Nexstar ownership in 2017. A one-hour afternoon newscast was added in the 4 p.m. weekday time slot in early 2016.

==== Accolades and honors ====
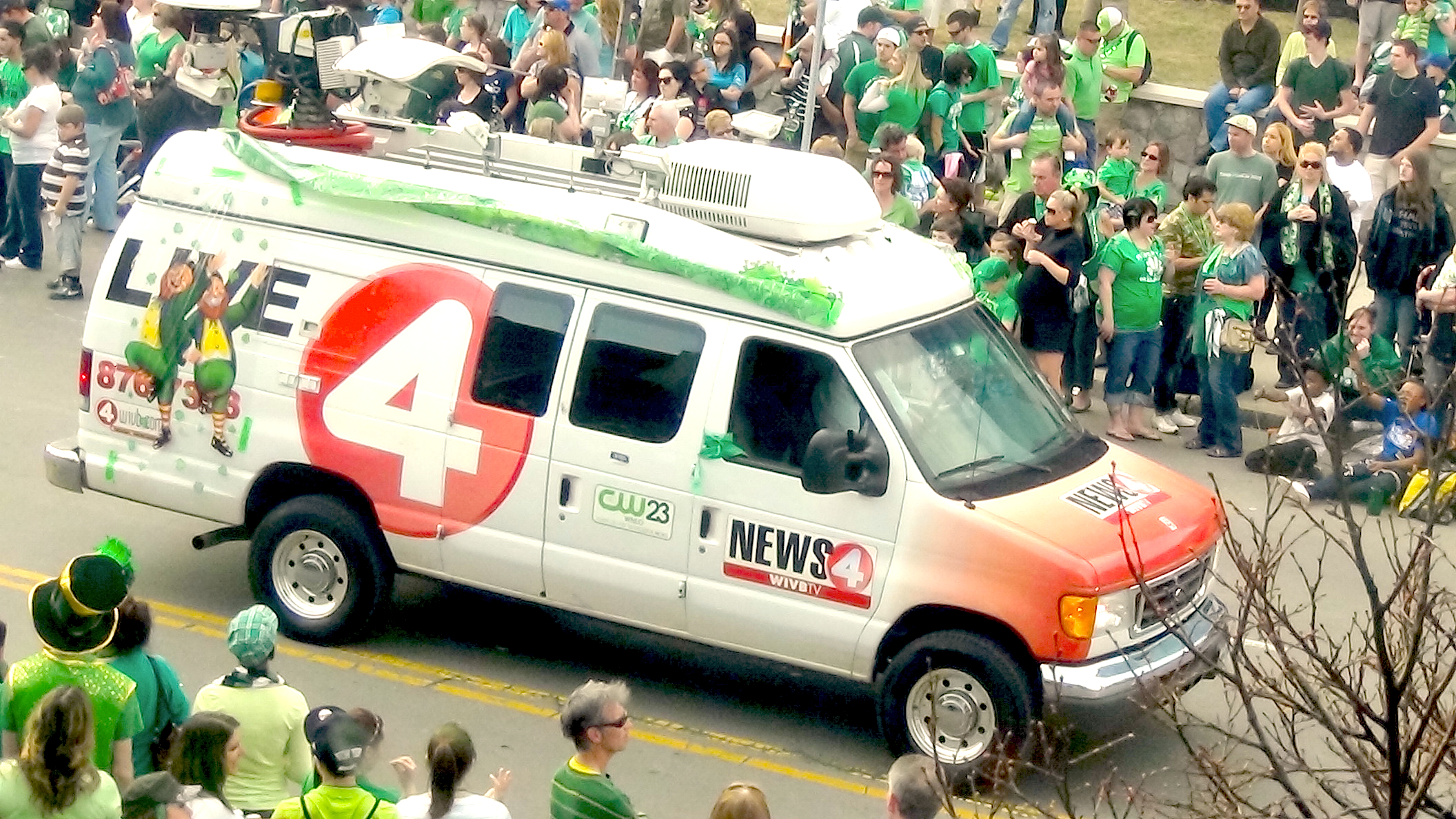
A WIVB-TV truck driving through the streets of the 2012 St. Patrick's Day parade in Buffalo, New York.

For most of the time since 2000, WIVB-TV has been the most-watched news station in Western New York (according to Nielsen) after rival WKBW-TV's long winning streak ended. The station regularly scores ratings wins for every newscast it airs from morning to night. It has become so dominant in the market that it at one time garnered the highest television ratings for a local newscast in the entire nation, according to advertisements run by the station, an honor regained in February 2008. As of late, rival WGRZ, which has also had strong ratings in the area has begun to challenge WIVB-TV's dominance, specifically in the weeknight 5 and 5:30 newscasts according to Nielsen's May 2007 sweeps data.

This station reclaimed the top position in the November 2007 sweeps although still in a statistical tie with WGRZ, and as of May 2009, is now solidly back in first place. All three stations in the Buffalo market have been, at various times in their history, among the highest-rated stations in the country and they continue to be fiercely competitive. The cable carriage disputes in October 2008 threatened WIVB-TV's high standing, pushing the station to a distant third, but with the official November sweeps out and the disputes resolved, WIVB-TV regained the lead. The end of The Oprah Winfrey Show in 2010, which traditionally has given a strong lead-in to WIVB-TV's newscasts, were expected to mark the end of WIVB-TV's lead in the ratings. Ratings for its replacement for the 2011–12 and 2012–13 seasons, Anderson, had initially been very poor, to the point where despite being placed in an earlier time slot, it had caused harm to both the show airing immediately after it (The Dr. Oz Show), and the evening newscasts, which are currently firmly in second place, halfway between new market leader WGRZ (which has The Ellen DeGeneres Show as a lead-in to its evening newscast) and third-place WKBW-TV (which had The Doctors as its lead-in). By the start of the 2012 season, the ratings for both Anderson and the WIVB-TV newscasts had recovered. By November 2018, WIVB had reclaimed the lead in news viewership following several years in which WGRZ had the highest viewership.

The station and its staff have won several Emmy Awards including one in 1999.

==== Notable former staff ====
- Marty Angelo – producer, creator, writer (1977–1980)
- Stan Barron – occasional sports contributor (1965–1984)
- John Beard – anchor (1978–1981)
- Jericka Duncan – reporter
- Tom Jolls – WBEN-TV news anchor (early 1960s)
- Chuck Lampkin – anchor (1970–1980)
- Van Miller – sports director, weather anchor and host of It's Academic and Beat the Champ (1955–1998)
- John Murphy – sports director from (2008–2012)
- Pam Oliver – reporter (1988–1990)
- Dick Rifenburg – sports (1951–1982)
- Tom Torbjornsen – automotive expert (2000s)

== Technical information ==
=== Tower ===
The WIVB-TV Tower is a 321.9-meter-tall (1,056 ft) guyed steel mast located at 8242 Center Street in Colden, New York, United States. The tower site was first used in 1948 by the Buffalo Evening News as the main broadcast tower for WIVB-TV (channel 4, the former WBEN-TV), now owned by Nexstar Media Group, who also owns the tower itself.

The tower is located in a farm field and fenced off near the entrance from Center Street. There are two towers on the site: a newer tower, and the older original 1948 structure.

WIVB temporarily left the tower site after 70 years in April 2018 when it entered into a channel-sharing agreement with sister station WNLO (channel 23) and sold its standalone digital channel allocation in the broadcast spectrum auction, transmitting for the next year from the WNED-TV (channel 17) tower in eastern Grand Island with WNLO while new tower construction took place to upgrade its television transmitter and antenna structure (WNLO transmitted from Grand Island since before the Western New York Public Broadcasting Association sold WNLO (then WNEQ) to WIVB's owners at the time, LIN Media, in 2001). It returned to the site in July 2019 after the two Nexstar stations both shifted to their new post-spectrum channel allocation, which also addressed the lack of signal range for Southern Tier viewers regarding both stations from Grand Island.

In addition to its longstanding use for WIVB, its former sister station, the Educational Media Foundation's WBKV (102.5, the former WBEN-FM and WTSS) uses the site. WBKV is noted for being included in a grandfather clause allowing the station to transmit from the tower at 110,000 watts, more than double the otherwise allowable power for a station in the northeastern United States, which allows the signal to also serve the Greater Toronto Area to the north across Lake Ontario.

=== Subchannels ===
WNLO and WIVB-TV transmit using WNLO's spectrum from a tower in Colden, New York. The stations' signals are multiplexed:

Subchannels of WNLO and WIVB-TV
License	Subchannel	Res.	Short name	Programming
WNLO	23.1	1080i	WNLO-HD	The CW
WNLO	23.2	480i	Rewind	Rewind TV
WIVB-TV	4.1	1080i	WIVB-HD	CBS
WIVB-TV	4.2	480i	COZI	Cozi TV
WIVB-TV	49.4	480i	GetTV	Great (WNYO-TV)

Broadcast on behalf of another station

=== Analog-to-digital conversion ===
WIVB-TV discontinued regular programming on its analog signal, over VHF channel 4, at 9 a.m. on June 12, 2009, the official date on which full-power television stations in the United States transitioned from analog to digital broadcasts under federal mandate. The station's digital signal remained on its pre-transition UHF channel 39, using virtual channel 4. It is one of several Buffalo area stations seen in the southern portion of the Canadian province of Ontario, including Toronto, which is the station's largest target audience. On April 30, 2009, Shaw Broadcast Services and Shaw Direct stopped transmitting the WIVB-TV signal, replacing it with CBS-owned WWJ-TV in Detroit. WIVB-TV also served as the default CBS station for portions of Steuben County, New York, due to the absence of a local affiliate in the Elmira market; this lasted until 2009 when Elmira ABC affiliate WENY-TV launched a third digital subchannel (on DT2) that is affiliated with CBS.

=== Spectrum reallocation ===
On April 14, 2017, WIVB announced that it had sold its spectrum in the FCC's broadcast incentive auction and that it would no longer broadcast on UHF channel 39. The station's programming would be unaffected, as WIVB shares UHF channel 32 with sister station WNLO while holding a separate license; WIVB continues to remap to virtual channel 4.1. The change took effect April 16, 2018.

Because WNLO's broadcast signal is centered further north than the former WIVB-TV Tower that was in Colden, the move further deteriorated reception of the channel in the western Southern Tier, where it had already been marginalized after the first digital transition and move to UHF, while at the same time improving the station's coverage along the Golden Horseshoe in Ontario, including a city-grade signal in Toronto. To restore its Southern Tier coverage area, Nexstar reached an agreement to transfer channel 32 to WUTV, which has historically put a greater emphasis on its Canadian viewership than WIVB has; WIVB and WNLO would in turn receive the channel 36 allocation (being vacated by adjacent-market channels WENY-TV and CITS-DT) that WUTV had originally purchased, which will allow it to reposition its signal so that it again serves the Southern Tier. The realignment took effect on the day of the repack, August 1, 2019.

== Carriage disputes ==
WIVB-TV has had significant contract disputes with both of the major cable television providers in the station's coverage area, Time Warner Cable (now Spectrum) which covers most of Western New York and Atlantic Broadband (now Breezeline) which covers much of its Northern Pennsylvania area as well as the rest of the Western New York region. In both cases, WIVB-TV demanded a rights fee of 25 cents per month per subscriber (in addition to another 25 cents for sister station WNLO) and refused to allow the carriers the right to carry the signal. The agreement with Time Warner Cable expired on October 2, 2008. WIVB-TV and WNLO were taken off Time Warner Cable at 12:30 a.m. on October 3 and were replaced with CBS College Sports Network and HBO Family respectively when an agreement between LIN TV and Time Warner Cable could not be reached. According to the station, LIN TV and Time Warner Cable were still trying to work on a deal even after the channels were dropped. Time Warner Cable stated negotiations broke off at the time of the shutoff.

After that, WIVB-TV openly advocated for Time Warner Cable customers to switch to Dish Network. Time Warner Cable, in turn, gave away free antennas and struck a deal with the Buffalo Bills Radio Network to simulcast the audio of the games on cable channel 4. Buffalo Bills games and some CBS programs were restored in Niagara County through Toronto-based CTV station CFTO-TV (and in other parts of the region through WROC-TV and WSEE-TV). In Erie, Cattaraugus, Allegany, and western Steuben counties, WIVB-TV continues to enforce its syndication exclusivity on Bills games preventing them from being brought in from another market. An agreement was reached between LIN TV and Time Warner Cable on October 29 allowing WIVB-TV and WNLO to return to Time Warner channel lineups. The deal, the financial terms of which were not made available, was to expire on May 31, 2013.

There was no agreement or negotiation with Atlantic Broadband, but that company continued to retransmit WIVB-TV without permission through 2008. Atlantic Broadband announced it would discontinue carrying WIVB-TV in favor of WSEE-TV on January 1, 2009, and were apparently making no effort to negotiate a new deal. However, due to this date falling on a holiday, WIVB-TV granted a 30-day extension at the end of which was an agreement that allowed WIVB-TV to continue to be carried uninterrupted. The agreement, originally set to expire in January 2012, was presumably renewed, as the channel remains available on that company's providers. WNLO was not included in the agreement, and CW service is now provided in these areas by WSEE-DT2.

On March 4, 2011, LIN Media pulled WIVB-TV and WNLO from Dish Network (the same service WIVB-TV and WNLO explicitly advised viewers to change to during the Time Warner Cable dispute) due to the expiration of the existing retransmission consent agreement; the blackout lasted nine days.

WIVB was pulled from DirecTV as part of a broader dispute between DirecTV and Nexstar on July 4, 2019, a dispute that was resolved on August 29.

WIVB was again pulled from DirecTV as part of another dispute between DirecTV and Nexstar at 7 p.m. (ET) on July 2, 2023.
