= WNLO =

Television station in Buffalo, New York

- Buffalo, New York; United States
- Channels: Digital: 36 (UHF), shared with WIVB-TV; Virtual: 23
- Branding: CW 23

Programming
- Affiliations: 23.1: The CW; 23.2: Rewind TV

Ownership
- Owner: Nexstar Media Group; (Nexstar Media Inc.)
- Sister stations: WIVB-TV; Tegna: WGRZ

History
- First air date: May 13, 1987
- Former call signs: WNEQ-TV (1987–2001)
- Former channel numbers: Analog: 23 (UHF, 1987–2009); Digital: 32 (UHF, until 2019)
- Former affiliations: PBS (1987–2001); Independent (2001–2003); UPN (2003–2006)
- Call sign meaning: Western New York, Buffalo

Technical information
- Licensing authority: FCC
- Facility ID: 71905
- ERP: 800 kW
- HAAT: 415 m (1,362 ft)
- Transmitter coordinates: 42°39′33″N 78°37′32″W

Links
- Public license information: Public file; LMS
- Website: www.wivb.com/cw23/

WNLO (channel 23) is a television station in Buffalo, New York, United States, serving as the local outlet for The CW. It is owned by Nexstar Media Group alongside CBS affiliate WIVB-TV (channel 4); Nexstar's Tegna subsidiary owns NBC affiliate WGRZ (channel 2). WNLO and WIVB-TV share studios on Elmwood Avenue in North Buffalo; through a channel sharing agreement, the two stations transmit using WNLO's spectrum from a tower in Colden, New York.

Channel 23 was the originally allocated non-commercial educational TV channel for Buffalo, but the 1958 donation of the facilities of the former WBUF-TV (channel 17) by NBC meant that educational broadcasting from WNED-TV started on what had been a commercial channel, leaving a permit held by the New York State Board of Regents to go unused. Spurred by a competing application from a Massachusetts group, the Western New York Public Broadcasting Association—owner of WNED-TV—applied for and won the construction permit for channel 23, which began broadasting as WNEQ-TV on May 13, 1987. It operated limited hours and aired reruns as well as programs that did not fit into channel 17's lineup. Unlike WNED-TV, it was not available on cable in Canada for years.

To fund the digital television conversion of WNED-TV, the Western New York Public Broadcasting Association opted to sell channel 23 and transfer the non-commercial allocation to channel 17, a move approved by the Federal Communications Commission over the protests of two competing Buffalo TV stations. After an arrangement to sell the channel to Sinclair Broadcast Group fell through, WIVB-TV owner LIN TV agreed to acquire channel 23. It took over operations in January 2001 and began operating channel 23 as WNLO, a commercial independent station. It featured a 10 p.m. newscast produced by WIVB-TV, which became the market's most-watched 10 p.m. news program. WNLO affiliated with UPN on January 1, 2003, and then with The CW upon the 2006 merger of UPN with The WB. WNLO airs morning, early evening and 10 p.m. newscasts from WIVB-TV as well as Buffalo Bandits lacrosse games.

== As a public TV station ==
Channel 23 was the originally allocated non-commercial educational TV channel for Buffalo, New York. The channel was one of the first awarded to a non-commercial applicant, the New York State Board of Regents, along with channels at Albany and Rochester, that July. However, New York State refused to provide funding to build the proposed network. Area leaders organized a local group, the Western New York Educational Television Association, which received a charter from the State Board of Regents in 1955 and attempted to build the station, which held the call sign WTVF. However, the group failed to receive money, and was disbanded and reformed. By April 1958, Eugene Sochor of the Buffalo Courier-Express assessed that "educational TV is at a standstill in Western New York".

In November 1958, NBC donated facilities of its failed WBUF-TV (channel 17) to get an educational television station on the air in Buffalo. Three months later, the Western New York Educational Television Association applied for a new construction permit for channel 17, having secured the temporary use of equipment of both stations at Elmwood and the long-term use of soon-to-be-vacated WGR facilities in the Hotel Lafayette, as well as a pledge for $115,000 (equivalent to $970,092 in 2025 dollars) in equipment from NBC. The Federal Communications Commission (FCC) granted the group a construction permit on March 4, and WNED-TV began broadcasting on March 30, making it the first educational TV station in the state of New York. Channel 23 was thereafter envisioned as a secondary educational channel for later activation and use for specialty services.

The Commonwealth Foundation for Public Broadcasting applied for channel 23 on February 26, 1982. With the interest shown by Commonwealth, a Massachusetts group, WNED's board of directors approved their own application for channel 23 that May. WNED president J. Michael Collins justified the application, noting that the station would have few additional capital expenses because it could use existing equipment. Commonwealth withdrew its application, and the FCC granted the construction permit to WNED that December. At the time, the station was proposed to air a mix of specialty minority-interest programs in prime time, programs not already seen on WNED, and repeats of WNED's most popular programs. In all, two-thirds of channel 23's programming would be previously unseen in the Buffalo area.

The station was intended to debut in February 1987, but a wet winter delayed the installation of new WNED-TV transmitting equipment, so that the old equipment could be used by channel 23. WNEQ-TV began broadcasting on May 13, 1987, with seven and a half hours a day of programs. In 1993, WNEQ-TV began broadcasting 13 hours a day of children's programming. By the late 1990s, funding cuts had left the station back to operating eight hours a day with entirely repeats.

WNEQ-TV was initially not available on cable television systems in Canada, unlike WNED-TV. In 1990, the Canadian Radio-television and Telecommunications Commission (CRTC) denied applications from 14 cable systems in the Toronto, Hamilton and Niagara Falls areas to add channel 23 to their lineups on the grounds that it would hurt the ability of TVOntario to raise funds from the public. Later, the CRTC began to allow some systems to add the channel if they dropped another U.S. station, such as WQLN of Erie, Pennsylvania. WNEQ-TV was finally added to Toronto cable systems in January 1997, with the CRTC citing "substantial and persistent subscriber demand for this service".

== As a commercial station ==
In May 1998, the Western New York Public Broadcasting Association announced it would put WNEQ-TV on the market and use the proceeds to fund the expensive, multi-million-dollar digital television conversion for WNED-TV, instead of having to fund conversion of two separate stations. This sale required a legal maneuver. Owing to the 1958 donation by NBC, WNED-TV operated on a non-reserved channel and thus could be converted to commercial use. To facilitate selling channel 23 as a commercial outlet, the association announced it would ask the FCC to change the non-commercial reservation to channel 17. The association agreed to sell WNEQ-TV for $33 million to Sinclair Broadcast Group, owner of WUTV (channel 29), that August. The transaction was snarled by petitions to deny from two local commercial stations: WKBW-TV (channel 7) and WNYO-TV (channel 49), the latter of which had also bid on the channel. Though the FCC ruled in July 1999 that a sale of WNEQ-TV was permissible, and Sinclair had already acquired programming, it withdrew from the purchase next month, amid rumors that Sinclair was dissatisfied with the price it paid and the delays in the transaction. Sinclair instead bought WNYO-TV, a station which had its own building, existing programming, and staff.

=== WNLO: Sale to LIN TV and relaunch ===
On November 8, 2000, LIN TV, owner of Buffalo CBS affiliate WIVB-TV (channel 4), announced it would purchase WNEQ-TV from the Western New York Public Broadcasting Association for $26.2 million. At the time, a group called the Coalition for Noncommercial Media was suing in federal appeals court to block FCC approval of the license change. Under the deal, LIN began programming channel 23 under a local marketing agreement in January 2001, with one priority being to add a 10 p.m. local newscast. The call sign was changed to WNLO (for Western New York and Buffalo).

On January 29, 2001, WNLO debuted, including its 10 p.m. newscast. It was not the first in the market, as WGRZ (channel 2) had rushed a 10 p.m. newscast to air on WPXJ-TV (channel 51) just 10 days earlier. In addition to the 10 p.m. news, the station offered syndicated programs, some of which had previously aired or were reruns from WIVB-TV, as well as a repeat of WIVB's morning show Wake Up and overnight home shopping.

Within a year of going on the air, LIN signed an affiliation agreement for WNLO with UPN, whose programs had previously been seen on WNGS (channel 67), effective January 1, 2003. WNLO had more visibility and resources than WNGS, which could not afford Nielsen ratings. Early on, LIN struggled to program WNLO's full broadcasting day due to the mid-season relaunch of the station, which included a midday four-hour block of paid programming for its first few months. WNLO was not available on Canadian cable systems until 2005, when the CRTC approved an application by Rogers Communications to distribute it in Toronto and other Southern Ontario cities in its digital tier on the condition that it not seek Toronto-area advertising revenues and because it was already available over-the-air in the area.

=== CW affiliation ===
In 2006, UPN and The WB merged to form The CW. WNYO, the area's WB affiliate, was affiliated by Sinclair with MyNetworkTV, a new network started by Fox Television Stations, in early March. In April, The CW and LIN signed a four-station affiliation agreement, including WNLO.

WIVB and WNLO were part of two larger corporate transactions within three years in the 2010s. LIN TV was acquired by Media General in 2014. After purchasing LIN, Media General initially agreed to merge with the Meredith Corporation but faced a shareholder revolt in the wake of an unsolicited offer from Nexstar Broadcasting Group, which agreed to acquire the company in 2016.

Nexstar acquired Tegna—owner of WGRZ—in a deal announced in August 2025 and completed on March 19, 2026. The deal included approval for Nexstar to own three station licenses in markets such as Buffalo. Integration of Tegna's stations into Nexstar is halted pending a preliminary injunction.

== Local programming ==
=== Newscasts ===
Buffalo's Fox affiliate, WUTV, had historically avoided starting a newscast because of its strong ratings performance with syndicated reruns at 10 p.m. As a result, Buffalo did not have a 10 p.m. newscast until early 2001. Upon being taken over by WIVB-TV, WNLO began airing The 10 O'Clock News, a half-hour 10 p.m. newscast anchored by Lisa Flynn. It was the second such newscast in the Buffalo market, beaten to air by a competing newscast produced by WGRZ for WPXJ-TV. Reruns of Seinfeld on WUTV attracted a larger audience than both newscasts combined. WNLO soundly beat WPXJ in the ratings; the latter newscast was discontinued in 2003. Competition for the 10 p.m. news audience was provided by WNYO-TV beginning in 2004, when it debuted a hybrid local–national newscast utilizing Sinclair's News Central format. In 2006, the News Central newscast was replaced with a new, WGRZ-produced local newscast, which WNLO beat by a four-to-one margin in its first ratings survey. By 2011, the WNLO 10 p.m. news was the highest-rated local news program among adults aged 18–49 and 25–54, and in total viewers, it was only surpassed by the 11 p.m. newscasts on WGRZ and WIVB.

In 2013, the WGRZ-produced newscast moved from WNYO to WUTV, a move that WGRZ hoped would increase its 10 p.m. news ratings. WNLO's newscast still led in the ratings; though the WGRZ–WUTV newscast had stronger viewership among younger audiences, and WUTV surpassed WNLO in one 2017 survey, WNLO was back on top by 2020. WUTV took news production in-house in 2021 but discontinued the newscast in 2023.

Live morning news came to channel 23 in 2009, when the 7 a.m. hour of WIVB-TV's weekday morning program Wake Up! moved from channel 4 after WIVB was forced to begin airing The Early Show in its entirety. The program was extended to 9 a.m. with the change, but in 2011 the 8 a.m. hour was relaunched as a lifestyle show, Winging It! Buffalo Style. It moved to 9 a.m. before being canceled in January 2015. A 6:30 p.m. weeknight newscast was added on January 15, 2018, airing against the network affiliates' national newscasts.

=== Sports ===
In April 2019, WNLO announced the acquisition of a package of Buffalo Bisons minor league baseball games, mostly on Saturday nights, once approximately every two weeks. WNLO also holds broadcast rights to the Buffalo Bandits lacrosse team, whose games are among the station's most-watched programs. In 2024–25, the Bandits' 17 regular-season games on WNLO had an average rating of 1.7, where nearly all of the CW entertainment programs on channel 23 had average ratings of less than 1.

== Technical information ==
WNLO and WIVB-TV transmit using WNLO's spectrum from a tower in Colden, New York. The stations' signals are multiplexed:

Subchannels of WNLO and WIVB-TV
License	Subchannel	Res.	Short name	Programming
WNLO	23.1	1080i	WNLO-HD	The CW
WNLO	23.2	480i	Rewind	Rewind TV
WIVB-TV	4.1	1080i	WIVB-HD	CBS
WIVB-TV	4.2	480i	COZI	Cozi TV
WIVB-TV	49.4	480i	GetTV	Great (WNYO-TV)

Broadcast on behalf of another station

WNLO began broadcasting a digital signal on channel 32 on April 1, 2004. It ended regular programming on its analog signal on June 12, 2009. the official digital television transition date, continuing to broadcast on channel 32.

Nexstar sold WIVB's spectrum in the incentive auction and began broadcasting both stations from one transmitter on April 16, 2018. This change caused a loss of reception of WIVB for some viewers, and Nexstar could not modify WNLO–WIVB-TV to correct this on channel 32. In 2019, the FCC approved a channel swap between WNLO–WIVB-TV and WUTV, moving the former to channel 36 and the latter to channel 32. This allowed WNLO–WIVB-TV to use the WIVB-TV tower site, restoring service to 364,172 viewers.
