= WPXJ-TV =

Television station in Batavia, New York

- Batavia–Buffalo, New York; United States
- City: Batavia, New York
- Channels: Digital: 24 (UHF); Virtual: 51

Programming
- Affiliations: 51.1: Ion Television; for others, see § Subchannels

Ownership
- Owner: Inyo Broadcast Holdings (sale to the E. W. Scripps Company pending); (Inyo Broadcast Licenses LLC)

History
- First air date: June 17, 1999
- Former call signs: WAQF (1996–1998)
- Former channel numbers: Analog: 51 (UHF, 1999–2009); Digital: 53 (UHF, until 2009), 23 (UHF, 2009–2019)
- Call sign meaning: Pax J (disambiguation from other Ion stations)

Technical information
- Licensing authority: FCC
- Facility ID: 2325
- ERP: 500 kW
- HAAT: 372.53 m (1,222 ft)
- Transmitter coordinates: 42°46′53.5″N 78°27′25.7″W

Links
- Public license information: Public file; LMS
- Website: iontelevision.com

WPXJ-TV (channel 51) is a television station licensed to Batavia, New York, United States, serving the Buffalo area as an affiliate of Ion Television. Owned by Inyo Broadcast Holdings, the station maintains offices on Exchange Street in Buffalo, and its transmitter is located in Cowlesville, New York.

Until August 2019, WPXJ-TV's transmitter was based at Pavilion, approximately halfway between Western New York's two largest cities, Buffalo and Rochester; it was the only station to serve both markets with the same signal (WNYB still serves both markets, but relies on translators and cable carriage to do so), although what little local programming the station has carried has traditionally favored Buffalo, and Ion now maintains a separate Rochester affiliation on the fourth digital subchannel of WHEC-TV.

== History ==
The station signed on the air on June 17, 1999, as an owned-and-operated station of Ion predecessor Pax TV, and was founded by Paxson Communications. WPXJ-TV was Paxson's second effort at launching a television station in Western New York; the first was Jamestown-based WNYP-TV (channel 26), an affiliate of Canadian television network CTV, which Pax founder Lowell W. "Bud" Paxson majority owned from 1966 to 1969. In February 2006, WPXJ-TV was added to Dish Network's Buffalo channel lineup on channel 51.

=== Near sale to Scripps; sale to Inyo Broadcast Holdings ===
On September 24, 2020, the Cincinnati-based E. W. Scripps Company announced that it would purchase Ion Media for $2.65 billion, with financing from Berkshire Hathaway. With this purchase, Scripps will divest 23 Ion-owned stations, but no announcement was made as to which stations that Scripps would divest as part of the move. However, on October 16, 2020, it was announced that WPXJ-TV would be one of the stations that Scripps would spin off as part of the merger. The buyer, revealed in an October 2020 FCC filing to be Inyo Broadcast Holdings, has promised to maintain the stations' Ion Television affiliations after the purchase. The proposed divestitures will allow the merged company to fully comply with the FCC local and national ownership regulations. This would have made it a sister station to ABC affiliate WKBW-TV (channel 7) if Scripps had decided to keep WPXJ-TV, but Buffalo has fewer than eight independently owned and operating full-power television stations, not enough to permit a duopoly in any case (even as both Nexstar Media Group and Sinclair Broadcast Group both hold longstanding duopolies in the same market). The transaction was finalized and closed on January 7, 2021.

Scripps announced its repurchase of all Inyo stations on February 26, 2026.

== Newscasts ==
For a time, WPXJ-TV carried a rebroadcast of newscasts from NBC affiliate WGRZ (channel 2), as well as a live 10 p.m. newscast produced by that station (this was part of a nationwide initiative for Pax affiliates to carry news and local content from NBC stations). Channel 2 News First at Ten was the first prime time newscast in the Buffalo market (as previously noted, virtually none of the newscast's content was geared toward Rochester, despite WGRZ having a large sister news bureau in that city). It was never a ratings contender and consistently lost the ratings battle with WNLO (channel 23)'s newscast in the same time slot, which had debuted a few weeks later but had been planned for months.

After Pax ended its local news partnerships with NBC in 2005, WGRZ later established a news share agreement with WNYO-TV (channel 49) to produce a half-hour 10 p.m. newscast for that station in April 2006, which effectively replaced WNYO-TV's in-house newscast that was canceled the month before in relation to the shutdown of owner Sinclair Broadcast Group's News Central division; that newscast was moved to Fox affiliate WUTV (channel 29) on April 8, 2013.

== Technical information ==
=== Subchannels ===
The station's signal is multiplexed:

Subchannels of WPXJ-TV
| Subchannel | Res. | Short name | Programming |
|---|---|---|---|
| 51.1 | 720p | ION | Ion Television |
| 51.2 | 720p | CourtTV | Court TV |
| 51.3 | 480i | DEFY | Defy |
| 51.4 | 480i | Laff | Laff |
| 51.5 | 480i | IONPlus | Ion Plus |
| 51.6 | 480i | BUSTED | Busted |
| 51.7 | 480i | GameSho | Game Show Central |
| 51.8 | 480i | QVC | QVC |
| 51.9 | 480i | ShopLC | Shop LC |

=== Analog-to-digital conversion ===
WPXJ-TV ended regular programming on its analog signal, over UHF channel 51, on June 12, 2009, the official date on which full-power television stations in the United States transitioned from analog to digital broadcasts under federal mandate. The station's digital signal moved from its pre-transition UHF channel 53 to UHF channel 23, using virtual channel 51.
