= June Bacon-Bercey =

American meteorologist (1928–2019)

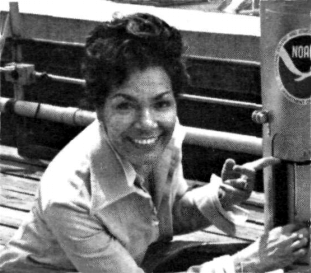
- June Bacon-Bercey, c. 1977
- Born: June Esther Griffin; October 23, 1928; Wichita, Kansas, U.S.
- Died: July 3, 2019 (aged 90); Burlingame, California, U.S.
- Education: University of California, Los Angeles; University of Southern California
- Children: 2
- Scientific career
- Fields: Meteorology; Radar metereology; Aviation meteorology; Weather forecasting
- Workplaces: National Weather Service; Sperry Rand Corporation; National Broadcasting Company; National Oceanic and Atmospheric Administration

June Esther Bacon-Bercey (née Griffin, October 23, 1928 – July 3, 2019) was an American international expert on weather and aviation who worked for the National Oceanic and Atmospheric Administration, the National Weather Service and the Atomic Energy Commission.

She was the first African-American woman to earn a degree in meteorology and was the first female TV meteorologist trained in the field of meteorology in the United States.

== Early life and education ==
Bacon-Bercey was born and raised in Wichita, Kansas, in 1928. Her father was an attorney and her mother a music teacher. Her father died when she was young, and her mother remarried and moved to Florida, leaving her to be raised by an aunt and uncle. She was an only child who enjoyed bike riding, hiking, playing the piano, and participating in Girl Scouts activities. Bacon-Bercey's fascination with weather began after she saw images of the atomic bomb and questioned its impact on the atmosphere. A high school physics teacher is credited for noticing Bacon-Bercey’s interest in water displacement and buoyancy and encouraging her to pursue a career in meteorology.

She first attended a private college close to home with an intent to major in math, but she left Friends University after two years to pursue a degree in meteorology. She then attended and earned her bachelor's degree in 1954 from the University of California, Los Angeles (UCLA), which at that time was one of the few schools in the nation to offer a four-year degree in atmospheric science. She faced opposition and discouragement in her pursuit of her meteorology degree, as she stated during a 1977 interview for a Baltimore Sun article, "When I chose my major, my adviser, who is still at U.C.L.A., advised me to go into home economics... I got a D in home economics and an A in thermodynamics.” Bacon-Bercey became the first African American woman to be conferred a meteorology degree from UCLA.

She earned a Masters of Public Administration (MPA) from the Journalism School of University of Southern California in 1979. At the age of 59, she earned a teaching credential to be able to serve as a county relief teacher for elementary and high school math and science courses. She taught until she was in her 80s, with her last assignments at Westmoor High School in Daly City, California.

June Esther Bacon-Bercey was a trailblazing meteorologist who broke multiple barriers in science and broadcasting. In 1954, she became the first Black woman to earn a degree in meteorology from UCLA, at a time when both women and African Americans were largely excluded from the field.

== Career ==
Shortly after graduation, Bacon-Bercey moved to Washington, D.C., for a position as a weather analyst and forecaster with the National Meteorological Center, now known as the National Oceanic and Atmospheric Administration's National Weather Service.

Bacon-Bercey continued her career as an engineer, when she worked for the Sperry Corporation, then worked for a variety of federal organizations including the United States Atomic Energy Commission. She accepted a position as a senior adviser at the Atomic Energy Commission in 1959 because of her interests to better understand the effects of hydrogen and atomic bombs on Earth’s atmosphere. While in this role, she studied fallout patterns caused by nuclear detonations.

In the 1960s, Bacon-Bercey rejoined NOAA in its New York City offices as a radar meteorologist, while studying journalism at New York University. In 1970, Bacon-Bercey worked in Buffalo, NY as a weather caster, making her the first woman meteorologist to have the role in the country.

In 1971, she joined WGR-TV as a news reporter, in which role she covered the Attica Prison riot. In 1972, she became the station's on-air meteorologist after the previous meteorologist was arrested for bank robbery. After only four months at the station, Bacon-Bercey became the station's chief meteorologist.

Beginning in 1979, Bacon-Bercey spent nearly ten years as the chief administrator for Television Weather Activities at the National Oceanic and Atmospheric Administration (NOAA) while working as an aviation meteorologist and teaching new technologies to forecasters.

Increasing the participation of African-American women in meteorology and geophysical science was a major focus for Bacon-Bercey. In 1978, she published an analysis of African-American meteorologists in the US. She had won $64,000 as a contestant on The $128,000 Question in 1977, which she used to establish a scholarship fund for young women interested in atmospheric sciences, administered by the American Geophysical Union (AGU). From 1978-1990, 13 women (12 graduate students, 1 undergraduate student) received $400-$500 of scholarship money from AGU's June Bacon-Bercey Scholarship in Atmospheric Sciences for Women. The Scholarship, which was reestablished in 2021 through support from AGU donors, the family of Bacon-Bercey and AccuWeather, provides $1,000 annually to recognize outstanding accomplishments for a scientist at their career-stage. Since 2021, four women have received the Scholarship.

Bacon-Bercey served on the AGU's Committee on Women and Minorities in Atmospheric Sciences. Together with Warren M. Washington, she co-founded the American Meteorological Society's Board on Women and Minorities, which was renamed the Board on Representation, Accessibility, Inclusion and Diversity (BRAID) in 2020. In addition, she served on the board of directors of the National Consortium for Black Professional Development.

In 2006, Bacon-Bercey was featured in a book for young people, June Bacon-Bercey: a meteorologist talks about the weather.

== Honors ==
Bacon-Bercey was the first woman, as well as the first African-American, to be awarded the American Meteorological Society's Seal of Approval for excellence in television weathercasting when she was working at WGR in Buffalo, New York, in the 1970s.

Bacon-Bercey was the first African-American, and first female African-American, member of the New York Academy of Sciences.

In 2000, she was honored during a three-day conference at Howard University for her contributions including: helping to establish a meteorology lab at Jackson State University in Mississippi in 1980, her endowment of the scholarship, and her work in California's public schools. Bacon-Bercey was also named a Minority Pioneer for Achievement in Atmospheric Sciences by NASA.

Since 2021, the American Meteorological Society's Award for Broadcast Meteorology has been named the June Bacon-Bercey Award for Broadcast Meteorology. The Award recognizes a broadcast meteorologist for "sustained long-term contributions to the community, or for outstanding work during a specific weather event."

== Personal life ==
Bacon-Bercey was married three times to Walker Bacon Jr., John Bercey and George Brewer. She had two daughters.

Bacon-Bercey died under hospice care in Burlingame, California, from frontotemporal dementia on July 3, 2019, at the age of 90. Her death was announced six months later.
