= WGRZ =

Television station in Buffalo, New York

- Buffalo, New York; United States
- City: Buffalo, New York
- Channels: Digital: 33 (UHF); Virtual: 2
- Branding: Channel 2, 2 On Your Side

Programming
- Affiliations: 2.1: NBC; for others, see § Subchannels

Ownership
- Owner: Tegna Inc., a subsidiary of Nexstar Media Group; (Multimedia Entertainment, LLC)
- Sister stations: Nexstar: WIVB-TV, WNLO

History
- First air date: August 14, 1954
- Former call signs: WGR-TV (1954–1983); WGRZ-TV (1983–2009)
- Former channel numbers: Analog: 2 (VHF, 1954–2009)
- Former affiliations: ABC (1956–1958); DuMont (secondary, 1954–1955)
- Call sign meaning: taken from WGR, with the Z mimicking a 2

Technical information
- Licensing authority: FCC
- Facility ID: 64547
- ERP: 716 kW
- HAAT: 308.4 m (1,012 ft)
- Transmitter coordinates: 42°43′7″N 78°33′46″W

Links
- Public license information: Public file; LMS
- Website: www.wgrz.com

WGRZ (channel 2) is a television station in Buffalo, New York, United States, affiliated with NBC. It is owned by the Tegna subsidiary of Nexstar Media Group; Nexstar also owns CBS affiliate WIVB-TV (channel 4) and CW station WNLO (channel 23). WGRZ's studios are located on Delaware Avenue in downtown Buffalo, and its transmitter is located on Warner Hill Road in South Wales, New York.

== History ==
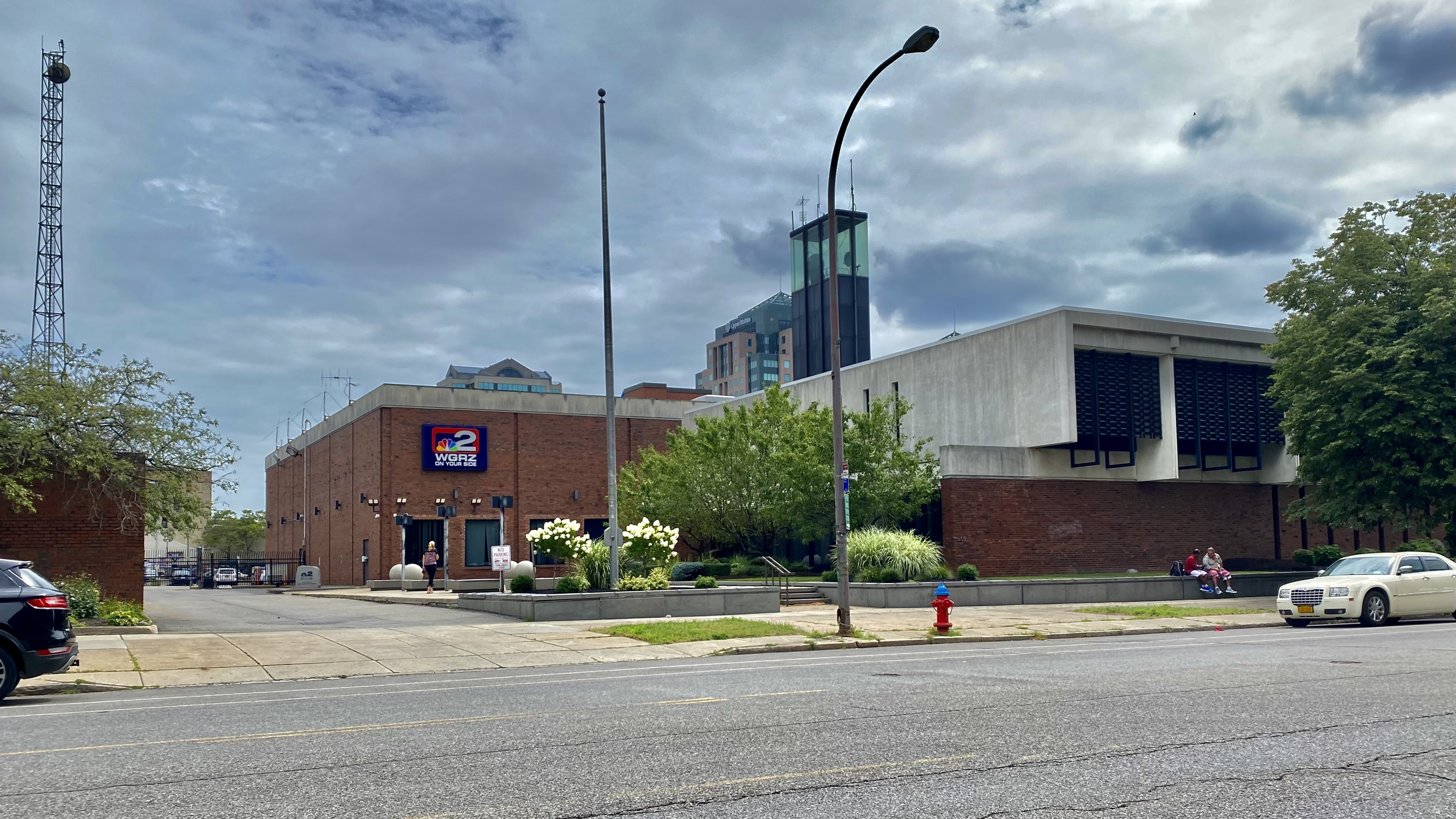
WGRZ-TV studios in downtown Buffalo, New York as seen in August 2021.

The station first signed on the air on August 14, 1954, as WGR-TV, owned by the WGR Corporation, along with WGR (550 AM). WGR-TV started out as an NBC affiliate sharing the 184 Barton Street studios of UHF outlet WBUF-TV (Channel 17). In 1955, WBUF-TV, which was dark at the time, was sold to NBC. In January 1956, WGR-TV became an ABC affiliate after NBC moved its programming to the company-owned WBUF.

Most TV sets could not receive channels above 13 or needed a special device to do it. All television reception at the time was via set-top or rooftop aerial antennas. UHF television technology was in its infancy, and most people did not understand how to receive the signals or had antennas designed to pick up UHF channels. UHF signals also did not travel as well as VHF, making it hard for viewers outside of Buffalo and its adjacent suburbs to get a clear picture. WGR-TV itself began its existence using the tower and transmitter of another defunct UHF station, the short-lived WBES-TV on channel 59. WBUF was an experiment by NBC to see if UHF television was yet viable if enough investment were placed into a UHF station; the experiment was not a success, and in September 1958, the station facility was donated to a public broadcaster to become WNED-TV, and NBC reaffiliated with WGR-TV.

ABC programming was not available in Buffalo for another two months until WKBW-TV (channel 7) signed on in November of that year as a full-time affiliate of that network. The failure of WBUF was a blow to UHF but served as a boon to WGR-TV locally. Viewers could easily receive the station's VHF channel 2 signal, and WGR-TV now had more syndicated and network program options. The station also carried some shows from the DuMont Television Network, until it shut down in 1956.

In 1959, WGR-TV launched an FM radio station, WGR-FM (96.9 MHz, now WGRF). Originally a simulcast of its AM radio sister, it began airing its own programming under the WGRQ call sign in 1973. Over the years, WGR Corporation bought several other radio and television stations across the country, including WNEP-TV in Scranton–Wilkes-Barre, WHAM-TV in Rochester (the call letters of which Transcontinent would change to WROC-TV, and is of no relation to the current station using the WHAM-TV call sign) and WDAF-AM/FM/TV in Kansas City, and eventually became known as Transcontinent Broadcasting. Transcontinent merged with Taft Broadcasting in 1964.

During the 1960s, WGR-TV also operated a repeater station on VHF channel 6 in Jamestown, New York. The repeater on channel 6 continued until the channel 2 transmitter was moved from Elmwood Avenue in Buffalo to the South Wales transmitter site, which greatly improved signal coverage into the population center of the mountainous Chautauqua region south of Buffalo. In 1972, the station moved into its current Downtown Buffalo facility at 259 Delaware Avenue.

In December 1982, Taft Broadcasting agreed to trade WGR-TV to movie theater chain General Cinema in return for WCIX in Miami (channel 6, now WFOR-TV on channel 4). At the time, the Federal Communications Commission (FCC) would not permit stations with different owners to share the same call sign. On May 1, 1983, in preparation for the ownership change, WGR-TV added a "Z" to its call sign, thus becoming WGRZ-TV. Z was chosen because of the letter's resemblance to the number 2, and also allowed General Cinema to continue trading on the WGR call letters and their then 60-year legacy in Buffalo. The trade closed two weeks later, with WGRZ becoming part of General Cinema's Coral Television division. In exchange, Taft acquired WCIX (channel 6) in Miami (now WFOR-TV on channel 4). Taft held on to 550 WGR and 96.9 WGRQ until 1987, when both stations were sold to Rich Communications. The AM station is now owned by Audacy, Inc., while its former FM sister is now owned by Cumulus Media.

In the years following the 1983 exchange deal, WGRZ-TV changed hands several times. General Cinema exited the broadcasting business in 1986 by selling Coral Television to WGRZ Acquisition Corp., a partnership between SJL Broadcast Management, TA Associates and Smith Broadcasting. The price tag was $56 million. Native Buffalonian and former Newport Television CEO Sandy DiPasquale also held an ownership stake in WGRZ-TV (through his stake in Smith Broadcasting) at this time. Two years later, Tak Communications purchased WGRZ-TV from the SJL-led group for $100 million in 1988. In October 1990, Tak's lenders sued the company to force the appointment of a receiver; Tak would file for Chapter 11 bankruptcy in January 1991 after reaching an agreement with its lenders. After Tak's creditors sought to take control of the company in December 1992, they would ultimately seize the company's assets in early 1994. In February 1995, Argyle Television Holdings II, a broadcasting holding company formed by a group of managers who had recently left Argyle I after that company sold all of its stations to New World Communications, was offered $146 million and received court approval to purchase WGRZ and KITV (in Honolulu, Hawaii) for $91 million. Argyle II closed on WGRZ-TV in April of that year, followed by KITV two months later.

WGRZ-TV nearly lost its NBC affiliation in 1994 when NBC's parent company, General Electric, announced plans to purchase King World Productions, the then-owner of CBS affiliate WIVB-TV (channel 4). Had it occurred, WIVB-TV would have become an NBC owned-and-operated station. However, the deal never materialized, and WIVB-TV was sold to the LIN TV Corporation after attempts to sell that station to Westinghouse Broadcasting, New World Communications, Tribune Broadcasting, Paramount Stations Group and the E. W. Scripps Company fell through; as a result, the Buffalo market was one of the few areas to not be affected by the affiliation switches that took place between late 1994 and late 1996. (Coincidentally, King World would eventually be acquired by CBS in 2000, who merged the company into CBS Television Distribution [now CBS Media Ventures] in 2007; CBS and Viacom had broken up at the time of King World's dissolution.) WGRZ lost the local rights to the Buffalo Bills to WIVB-TV when the NFL returned to CBS in 1998 after the network acquired the rights to the American Football Conference package; this ended a 33-year run for Channel 2 as the Bills' unofficial hometown station. Presently, WGRZ airs Bills games when they are featured on NBC's Sunday Night Football.

Gannett acquired WGRZ-TV and WZZM-TV in Grand Rapids, Michigan, from Argyle II in a 1996 swap deal that saw KOCO-TV in Oklahoma City and WLWT in Cincinnati being traded by Gannett to Argyle II. The deal was triggered by issues from cross-ownership rules related to Gannett's ownership of The Cincinnati Enquirer and the Niagara Gazette, as well as cross-ownership rules related to Gannett's 1995 acquisition of Multimedia Cablevision in the Oklahoma City market. In January 1997, seven months prior to Argyle II's merger with the broadcasting unit of the Hearst Corporation, the deal formed Hearst-Argyle Television (which Hearst now wholly owns under the name Hearst Television). WGRZ dropped the "-TV" suffix in 2009.

On June 29, 2015, the Gannett Company split in two, with one side specializing in print media and the other side specializing in broadcast and digital media. WGRZ was retained by the latter company, named Tegna.

Nexstar Media Group, the owner of WIVB-TV and WNLO (channel 23) in the Buffalo market, acquired Tegna in a deal announced in August 2025 and completed on March 19, 2026. The deal included approval for Nexstar to own three station licenses in markets such as Buffalo.

== Programming ==
Previous local programs include the talk show Your Today in WNY (2007–2008), the talk show Nearly Noon (hosted by Dan Neaverth, 1980s), a local version of Bowling for Dollars (hosted by Ed Kilgore, for two runs – one in the 1970s and a second shorter run in 2008), the classic television anthology series Lunchtime with the Classics (September 7, 2010 – September 6, 2011), and the weekly late-night series In the Buff (February 17, 2013 – late 2013). The Healthy Zone (2010–2014) was a weekday show hosted by Maria Genero and Dr. Derek Alessi, which focused on physical, emotional, community and financial health and wellness. 2 The Unknown featured psychic Karen Reece and aired for one season (2014–15) on WGRZ; it was the series' second season (its previous season had aired on WBBZ under the title Secrets from Beyond). Reece returned to WBBZ as host of Psychic Encounters (later The Karyn Reece Show) in 2016. The Cat's Pajamas was an overnight block, usually presenting movies, with weatherman Barry Lillis hosting and news updates from the WGRZ overnight team between films.

The syndicated cartoon series Colonel Bleep used WGR-TV as its flagship station in the late 1950s; Richard Ullman syndicated the show from Buffalo (production was handled by Robert D. Buchanan out of Miami, Florida).

In 2000, WGRZ-TV took over the broadcast rights to televise the New York Lottery's live drawings from longtime home WKBW-TV, when that station's contract with the lottery ran out. WGRZ dropped the lottery drawings in October 2013.

=== Sports programming ===
WGRZ airs select Buffalo Bills games since 2006 as part of NBC's Sunday Night Football package. WGRZ also simulcasts any Bills games those that are exclusive to NBC's streaming service Peacock, as per NFL local team anti-siphoning rules (other non-Peacock streaming or cable games are syndicated to other stations in most cases).

WGRZ formerly aired selected Buffalo Sabres games from 2005 to 2021 as part of NBC's broadcast contract with the NHL. Despite a conflict with the Kentucky Derby in 2007, WGRZ aired game 5 of the Senators–Sabres playoff series in its entirety, including the overtime period that NBC omitted and moved to Versus (later NBCSN).

=== News operation ===
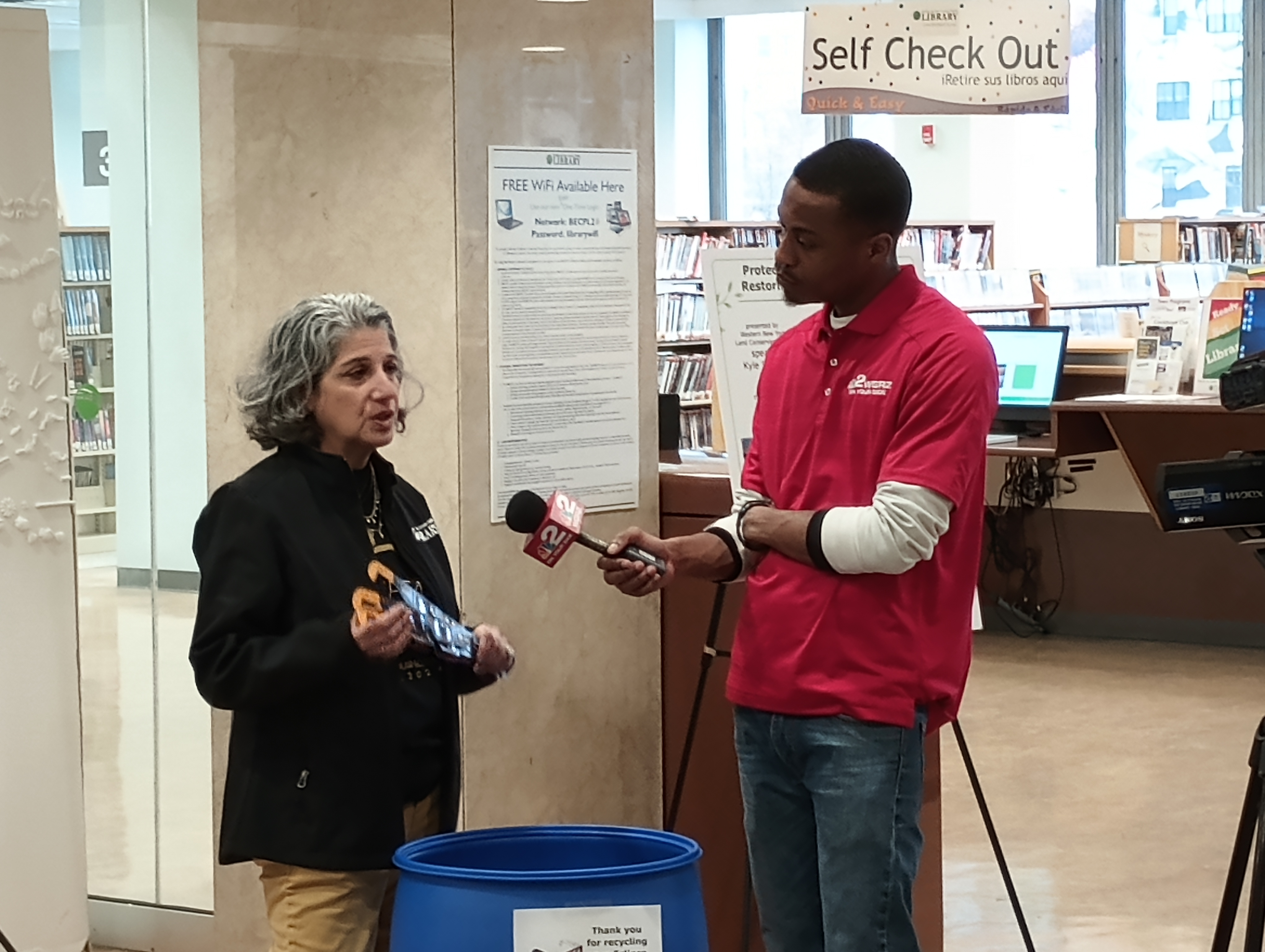
WGRZ reporter interviewing a subject at the Buffalo and Erie County Public Library in 2024.

WGRZ presently broadcasts 30 1/2 hours of locally produced newscasts each week (with five hours each weekday, three hours on Saturdays and 2 1/2 hours on Sundays). In addition, replays of WGRZ's midday and 6 p.m. newscasts air on a one-hour delay on WGRZ-DT2. Unlike most television stations, WGRZ takes an openly activist "watchdog journalism" approach to its news coverage, with its commitment to "Holding People In Power Accountable" and being "On Your Side". As a result of this and larger corporate investment, WGRZ has the largest staff in the Buffalo television market with more general assignment/feature reporters, and sports reporters than either WIVB or WKBW-TV.

The station used the NewsCenter brand for its newscasts in the 1970s. The current brand, Channel 2 News, dates to the 1980s and early 1990. WGRZ was the first in the market to adopt a 5 p.m. newscast (hence the newscast retaining its title "First at Five" ever since). In the early 1990s, WGRZ-TV used the "24 Hour News Source" format, providing news briefs each hour outside of regular newscasts. From 2001 to 2003, WGRZ-TV (as part of an NBC initiative, as well as an effort to preempt WIVB's plans to launch its own prime time news program for WNLO) produced a 10 p.m. newscast for Pax owned-and-operated station WPXJ-TV (channel 51). In 2006, WGRZ-TV began producing another 10 p.m. newscast, this time for WB affiliate WNYO-TV Channel 49 (now a MyNetworkTV affiliate). The newscast was known as 2 News on 49 – 10 at 10 (later 2 On Your Side Ten at 10). It originally featured ten minutes of news and the rest was dedicated to sports.

WGRZ-TV was the last of the three Buffalo television news outlets to produce a midday newscast, which it debuted in February 2008 in a traditional noon time slot. In June 2009, it moved to an 11 a.m. time slot, the first of its kind in the Buffalo market. (As previously noted, the 11 a.m. news re-airs at noon on WGRZ-DT2.) On February 17, 2010, WGRZ upgraded its newscasts to upconverted widescreen standard definition. From then until October 29, 2011, the station's news footage was shot in 4:3 SD, then cropped to a 16:9 aspect ratio and upconverted to 1080i in master control, before HD graphics and pictures were added for broadcast.

On January 17, 2011, WGRZ debuted a new set for its newscasts during Daybreak, which was designed for the transition to high definition newscasts and features extensive use of steel, glass and wood in combination with HD flat panel displays, blue lighting, and a background of several local landmarks (including Buffalo City Hall, Niagara Falls, the Erie Community College City Campus, and Old Erie County Hall). During the 10‑day construction period, the station temporarily broadcast its newscasts from one of its interview areas. The new set complements the HD weather set that debuted in February 2010. Rival WKBW-TV 7 upgraded its newscasts to true high definition in August 2011. That prompted WGRZ to upgrade its newscasts to true high definition on October 29, 2011. WGRZ began to broadcast its field video in full HD on October 29, 2011, making Channel 2 the only Buffalo television station to offer all aspects of its news production in true HD.

On April 23, 2012, WGRZ and Investigative Post announced a partnership in which the latter would co-produce investigations, interviews and other news segments that focus on various government issues around western New York. In addition, WGRZ and Investigative Post launched a co-branded website incorporating shared content. As a result of this partnership, former Buffalo News reporter Jim Haney and former Patch reporter Dan Telvock began serving as contributors for WGRZ, conducting interviews on the Sunday edition of Daybreak, producing weekly news segments with Investigative Post content, and making periodic appearances on WGRZ's other newscasts. The partnership with Investigative Post did not result in cutbacks to WGRZ's staff, instead it added additional resources for investigative reporting.

On August 6, 2012, WGRZ expanded its weekday morning newscast to 2½ hours, moving the start of the program at 4:30 a.m. On September 15, 2012, WGRZ added a second hour to its Saturday morning newscast from 6 to 7 a.m., while moving what became the second hour of the show ahead one hour to 9 a.m.

On April 8, 2013, the WGRZ-produced 10 p.m. newscast moved from WNYO-TV to Fox-affiliated WUTV (which had been the largest Fox station by market size to not offer any news programming). The station explained a weak lead-in by MyNetworkTV programming on WNYO prompted the switch. As part of this arrangement, the 10 p.m. newscast expanded from weeknights-only to a nightly newscast. A rebroadcast of the 6 a.m. hour of WGRZ's morning newscast was added on WNYO-TV in the interim, which eventually was seen on WUTV as well. Although WNYO-TV and WUTV are both owned by Sinclair Broadcast Group, an ownership group known for carefully managing the content of newscasts on its local stations, the terms of the contract between WGRZ and WUTV prohibited Sinclair from having any editorial control over the newscasts. WUTV replaced WGRZ's newscast with one produced by its own stations WSTM-TV and WHAM-TV in July 2021, with WGRZ's prime time newscast moving to WGRZ-DT2. The prime time newscast was quietly canceled some time before January 2023, by which point WUTV's newscast had also been canceled and WNLO was the sole over-the-air prime time newscast left in the market.

In August 2013, WGRZ announced a partnership with the Niagara Frontier Transportation Authority to provide traffic reports for the Daybreak and First at Five newscasts on weekdays. This is similar to the former partnership that the NFTA had with competitor WKBW-TV 7 until the summer of 2013. WGRZ had previously employed in-house traffic reporters.

==== Storm Team 2 Weather ====
WGRZ's "Storm Team 2" weather team currently features four meteorologists and two weather anchors. All meteorologists and weather anchors (except Kevin O'Neill and Josh Koslowski) have an AMS and/or NWA Broadcast Seals of Approval. Meteorologist Jennifer Stanonis has the Certified Broadcast Meteorologist seal and is only the second meteorologist in the Buffalo, NY television market to have earned this. Current feature reporter Kevin O'Neill replaced Mary Beth Wrobel as a meteorologist since Wrobel left the station to pursue opportunities outside of media; Wrobel later returned as a fill-in meteorologist in late 2014. Josh Koslowski is now the fourth meteorologist at WGRZ as of May 2015. In addition to his work with WGRZ, he also provides on-air forecasts for WHEC-TV in the nearby Rochester, NY market. Patrick Hammer was announced as the station's fifth meteorologist in June 2015. He joins the station from KSTP in Minneapolis/St. Paul, MN and will become the Chief Meteorologist once Kevin O'Connell retires in 2017.

WGRZ is the only television station in Western New York to currently operate an in-house weather radar from its broadcast tower in South Wales, New York. The radar is branded as "Live Precision Doppler 2" (formerly known as "Live Doppler 2000" prior to 2000), and utilizes street-level mapping and storm-tracking capabilities.

In February 2010, WGRZ unveiled a new weather set that includes HD flat panel displays, improved lighting, and graphics and technology upgrades which would be phased in throughout that spring. "Storm Team 2 Interactive Radar" was introduced in February 2010 as an enhancement to the main website.

On April 15, 2010, WGRZ debuted new weather graphics (utilizing WSI TruVu MAX for standard graphics), and upgraded radar and weather alert systems (utilizing WSI TruVu TITAN for Live Precision Doppler 2, and WSI TruVu Alert for weather alerts). All radar and graphics systems were upgraded to full high definition (it was the first Buffalo station to have a HD weather graphics system; WKBW followed in November 2010, followed by WIVB in February 2012) and provide enhanced capabilities compared to previous systems used.

On May 3, 2010, "Precision Doppler 2" introduced 3D storm-tracking capability, as well as a real-time lightning indicator (WIVB had earlier upgraded its radar to include these capabilities in 2007); it also debuted a new weather crawl system called "Storm Team 2 Alert", with enhanced features such as the ability to display both county maps and doppler radar with any warnings that are issued. The Storm Team 2 Weather app was introduced in July 2010 providing new mobile capabilities.

In January 2014, WGRZ debuted their new digital subchannel called Storm Team 2 WeatherNation TV. The new channel combines local forecasting from WGRZ's in-house meteorologists with national forecasts provided by the staff of WeatherNation TV. This has since been replaced by the Justice Network.

On July 16, 2015, WGRZ debuted Rooftop Weather, which is a brand new outdoor weather set built on the roof of their Buffalo studios. This new set features a view of multiple Buffalo landmarks, including Buffalo City Hall, Fountain Plaza, the new Avant Building, the new Robert H. Jackson United States Federal Courthouse, among others. It will complement the existing weather set indoors and makes WGRZ the second station in the Buffalo market (after WKBW-TV) to have a dedicated outdoor weather set.

==== Ratings ====
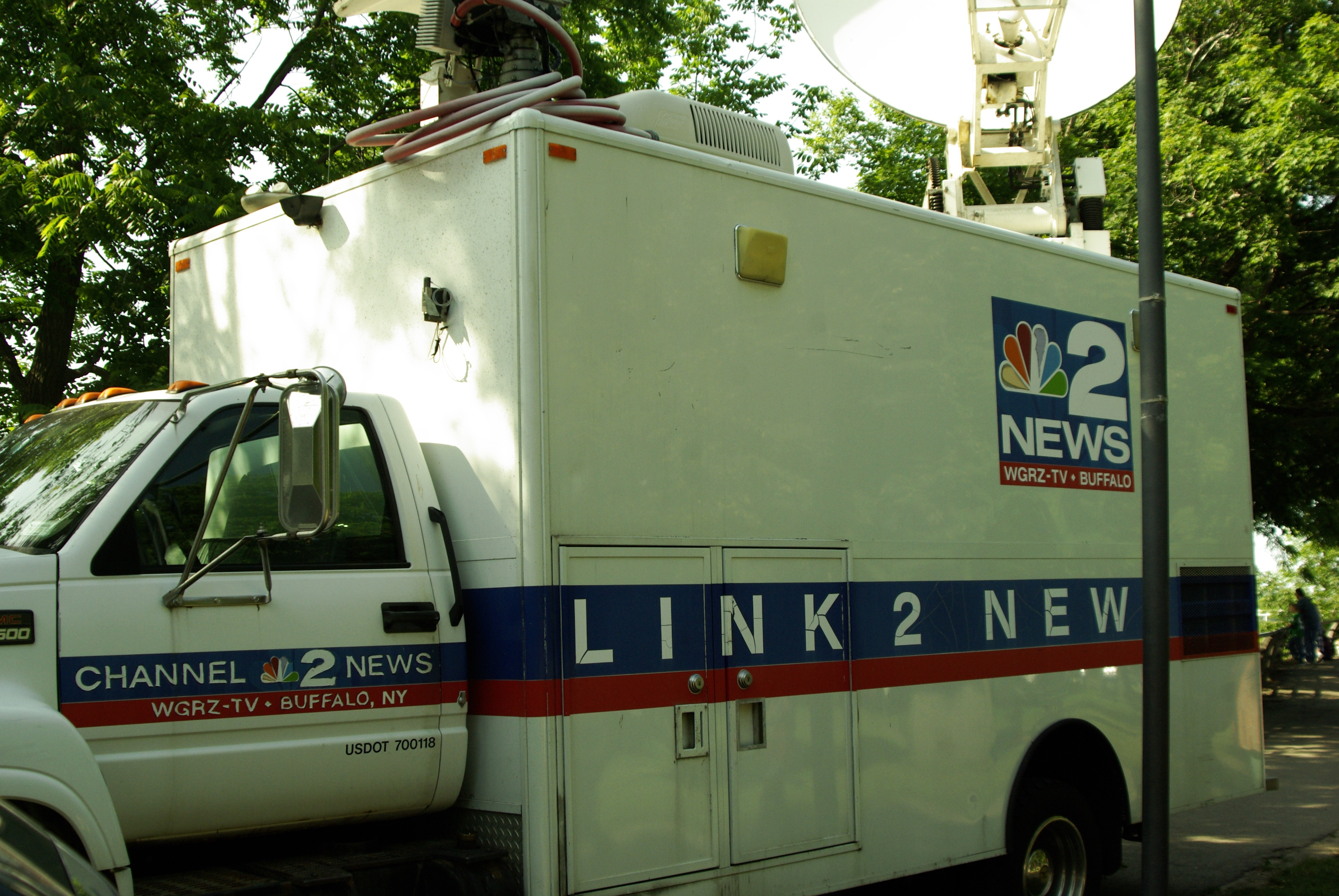
WGRZ satellite truck.

Aside from a brief period in the 1970s when lead anchor Ron Hunter led WGR-TV's newscasts to the top of the Nielsen ratings, WGRZ was historically the third-place station in the Buffalo market through most of its first four decades on the air. It trailed usual market leader WKBW-TV and heritage station WBEN-TV, later WIVB-TV. WGRZ, WIVB-TV and WKBW-TV have been among the highest-rated television stations in the country and all three are fiercely competitive in the market's local ratings. Both WGRZ and WIVB-TV benefited from WKBW-TV's decline in the late 1990s; WGRZ had the further advantage of investment from Gannett, a major nationwide multimedia company (something WKBW had when it was owned by Capital Cities Communications, which had sold channel 7 in 1986 upon its acquisition of ABC to comply with ownership limits rules in place then, which WKBW was affiliated with, then as now).

WGRZ's newscasts, which have performed a strong second in recent years to rival WIVB-TV, has begun to challenge channel 4's dominance in news ratings, specifically in the 5 and 5:30 p.m. newscasts according to Nielsen's May 2007 sweeps data. By July 2007, WGRZ's morning newscast, Daybreak, was soundly beating WIVB-TV's Wake Up! in the ratings. Channel 2's 11 p.m. newscasts also returned to the #1 position, and became one of the highest-rated late newscasts in the United States. However, in the May 2009 sweeps, WGRZ lost significant ground to WIVB-TV and a resurgent WKBW-TV, and fell to a distant second, closer to third-place WKBW-TV than it was to WIVB-TV.

In the November 2009 sweeps, WGRZ was one of many NBC affiliates to fall victim to the so-called "Leno Effect" (in which NBC affiliates' late-evening newscasts experienced decreased ratings stemming from the weakening NBC lead-in The Jay Leno Show); as in many of the affected markets, WGRZ's 11 p.m. newscast fell to a distant third, behind both WIVB-TV and WKBW-TV (although WGRZ's weekday morning newscast regained the lead over WIVB's morning show, thanks in large part to the return of John Beard to the Buffalo market after over 25 years in Los Angeles). With NBC moving Leno back to The Tonight Show in February 2010, WGRZ rebounded to a much closer second place behind WIVB-TV in the July 2010 sweeps; however, Daybreak lost ground, once again falling behind WIVB. In early 2011, Daybreak once again became the market's #1 morning show.

For the November 2011 sweeps, Daybreak remained #1 among the market's morning newscasts. For the first time, WGRZ had the #1 newscast at 5, 5:30 and 6 p.m., displacing rival WIVB-TV to a close second place in the early evening timeslot. WGRZ remained in second place for the 10 p.m. and 11 p.m. newscasts. For the February 2012 sweeps, WGRZ remained a dominant #1 in the morning. It also became even more dominant in early evenings as WIVB-TV became a more distant second place in the timeslot. Although WGRZ stayed in second place among the market's late newscasts, it narrowed WIVB's lead in the time period.

For the February 2013 sweeps, WGRZ widened its lead in the morning by 24%, in large part due to the addition of Melissa Holmes as co-anchor of Daybreak. That program now has almost the same number of viewers as WIVB-TV and WKBW-TV's morning shows combined. WGRZ also further increased its lead as the #1 newscast for its early evening newscasts with anchors Scott Levin & Maryalice Demler. Only the late evening newscasts during the week trail WIVB-TV in viewership; however, WGRZ is still dominant in the key demographics which advertisers covet most. Viewership for WGRZ's weekend newscasts also places at a dominant #1, although as an NBC affiliate, it is subject to far fewer sports pre-emptions than its competitors, both of which carry more college sports on weekends as affiliates of CBS and ABC.

WGRZ held the lead in the ratings viewership for most of the time between 2011 and November 2018; during the latter sweeps month, WIVB retook the ratings lead.

==== Notable current on-air staff ====
===== News =====
- Maryalice Demler – evening co-anchor

===== Contributors =====
- Andrew Peters – co-host of Sports Extra
- Ruben Brown – co-host of Sports Extra

==== Notable former on-air staff ====
- June Bacon-Bercey – meteorologist (1970s)
- John Beard – anchor (2009–2018)
- Susan Candiotti – reporter
- Nick Clooney – anchor (1994)
- Geoff Fox – meteorologist (1980–1984)
- Bill Mazer – sports anchor (1954–196)
- Danny Neaverth – host of Nearly Noon with Dan Neaverth
- Gary Papa – sports anchor
- Joey Reynolds – teen correspondent (mid-1950s)
- Allison Rosati – anchor
- Ernie Warlick – sports anchor (1960s)

== Logo ==
In the 1960s, the station used two cartoon elves, named Earis and Iris, as part of its logo. In 1983, to coincide with the call letter change to WGRZ-TV, the "futuristic" logo consisted of two lines, making an outline of the number two. In 1988, the station's logo consisted of simply a large number "2" in a common Avant Garde font, with a yellow triangle over blue added in the early 1990s. In the mid-1990s, the logo changed to a blue-on-red box with the bottom reading WGRZ-TV Buffalo. The NBC logo is placed to the left of the numeral "2"; however, "NBC" is not mentioned in the station's on-air brand (which is simply "Channel 2"). With the upgrade of its newscasts to high definition on October 29, 2011, the station introduced an updated version of the logo, which was determined by viewer voting on the station's website.

== Additional facts ==
According to the Baseball Hall of Shame book series by Joe and Al Zullo, WGR-TV did not complete the telecast of the game between the Houston Astros and the Los Angeles Dodgers on September 26, 1981. The station went to an Army training film as scheduled at 5 p.m. that afternoon. As a result, local baseball fans missed Astros pitcher Nolan Ryan's record fifth no-hitter.

WGRZ was one of the founding members of the "Love Network" that carried the Jerry Lewis MDA Labor Day Telethon; WGRZ continued to carry the telethon until the end of its run as a syndicated program (the broadcast moved to WKBW-TV in 2013, when the telethon moved to ABC, and ended its run after the 2014 event). WGRZ also carried its own Kids Escaping Drugs telethon. In 2020, WGRZ took over the long-running Variety Kids telethon, which had aired on WKBW-TV from 1962 to 2019; WGRZ shares the broadcast with WBBZ-TV.

== Technical information ==
=== Subchannels ===
The station's signal is multiplexed:

Subchannels of WGRZ
| Subchannel | Res. | Short name | Programming |
|---|---|---|---|
| 2.1 | 1080i | WGRZ-HD | NBC |
| 2.2 | 480i | Antenna | Antenna TV |
| 2.3 | 480i | Crime | True Crime Network |
| 2.4 | 480i | Quest | Quest |
| 2.5 | 480i | OXYGEN | Oxygen |
| 49.3 | 480i | Comet | Comet (WNYO-TV) |

Broadcast on behalf of another station

WGRZ-DT2 was affiliated with NBC Weather Plus until that network shut down in December 2008, and aired a locally originated "Weather Plus" channel between that time and June 2009. The DT2 channel then switched to Universal Sports, which it carried through the end of 2011.

The Retro Television Network was previously seen on WGRZ-DT3. The 2.3 channel was removed in September 2011 with no replacement, in order to provide better picture quality to both the DT2 and the main WGRZ signal. The DT3 subchannel had never gained significant cable carriage and by that time, much of the programming was being duplicated by WBBZ-TV. Although the DT2 subchannel has achieved significant cable penetration dating to its time as a Weather Plus outlet, Universal Sports itself converted to a cable and satellite-only service in January 2012 as part of Comcast's overhaul of the NBC Sports division. WGRZ-DT2 then became an affiliate of Antenna TV, competing with WBBZ-TV. The DT2 subchannel returned to weather on January 1, 2014, affiliating with WeatherNation TV with the local branding StormTeam 2 WeatherNation. Antenna TV then moved to a reactivated DT3.

Justice Network was added as a digital subchannel in January 2015, replacing WeatherNation TV. Quest was added as an additional channel in late January 2018.

=== Analog-to-digital conversion ===
WGRZ ended regular programming on its analog signal, over VHF Channel 2, at 1 p.m. on June 12, 2009, the official date on which full-power television stations in the United States transitioned from analog to digital broadcasts under federal mandate. The station's digital signal remained on its pre-transition UHF channel 33, using virtual channel 2.

As part of the SAFER Act, WGRZ kept its analog signal on the air until June 26 to inform viewers of the digital television transition through a loop of public service announcements from the National Association of Broadcasters. WGRZ dropped the -TV suffix, like most Gannett stations, just a week after the transition.
