= WNYO-TV =

Television station in Buffalo, New York

ATSC 3.0 station

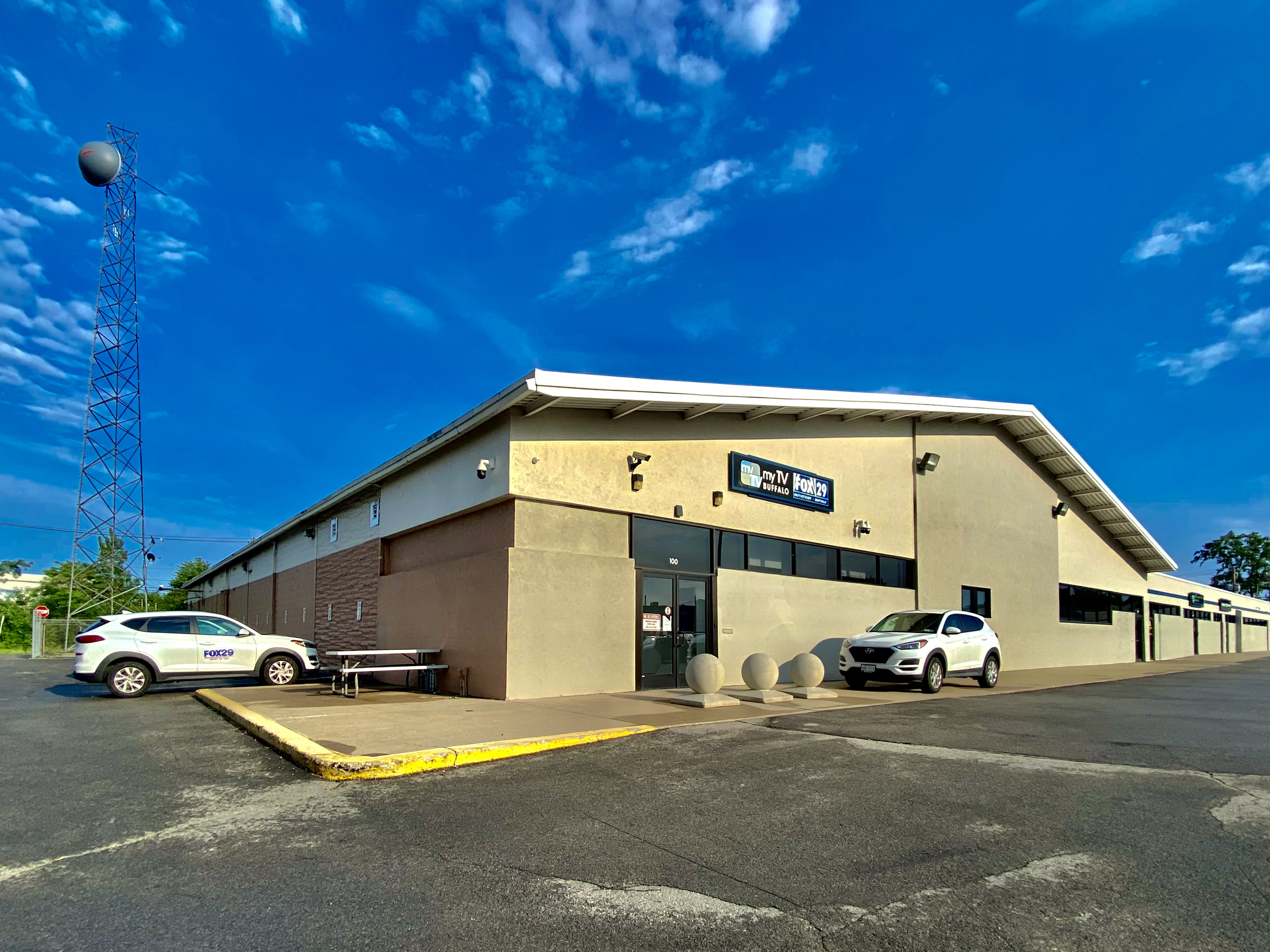
- The WUTV and WNYO studios in North Buffalo as seen in June 2022
- Buffalo–Niagara Falls, New York; United States
- City: Buffalo, New York
- Channels: Digital: 16 (UHF); Virtual: 49
- Branding: MyTV Buffalo

Programming
- Affiliations: 49.1: Independent with MyNetworkTV; for others, see § Technical information and subchannels

Ownership
- Owner: Sinclair Broadcast Group; (New York Television, Inc.)
- Sister stations: WUTV

History
- First air date: September 1, 1987
- Former call signs: WNYB-TV (1984–1996)
- Former channel numbers: Analog: 49 (UHF, 1987–2009); Digital: 34 (UHF, 2004–2009); 49 (UHF, 2009–2020)
- Former affiliations: Independent (1987–1989); Fox (1989–1990); TBN/TCT (1990–1996); The WB (1996–2006)
- Call sign meaning: Western New York and Ontario

Technical information
- Licensing authority: FCC
- Facility ID: 67784
- ERP: 575 kW
- HAAT: 329 m (1,079 ft)
- Transmitter coordinates: 43°1′32.2″N 78°55′42.1″W

Links
- Public license information: Public file; LMS
- Website: mytvbuffalo.com

WNYO-TV (channel 49) is a television station in Buffalo, New York, United States. It is programmed primarily as an independent station, but maintains a secondary affiliation with MyNetworkTV. WNYO-TV is owned by Sinclair Broadcast Group alongside Fox affiliate WUTV (channel 29) and the two stations share studios on Hertel Avenue near Military Road in Buffalo; WNYO-TV's transmitter is located on Whitehaven Road (near I-190) in Grand Island, New York.

The construction permit for channel 49 was issued in 1984 and changed hands twice before the station went on the air on September 1, 1987, as WNYB-TV. While TVX Broadcast Group handled much of the station's construction, the company made another purchase that forced it to sell the unbuilt WNYB-TV to remain under national ownership limits. Channel 49's first owner was Aud Enterprises, a division of the Buffalo Sabres hockey team; channel 49 aired Sabres road games and served as the Fox affiliate from 1989 to 1990. It also lost an average of $1 million a year. In 1990, under a deal brokered the previous year, the Sabres games, Fox programming, and syndicated shows on WNYB-TV moved to WUTV, with Tri-State Christian Television (TCT) buying channel 49 to broadcast Christian programming.

TCT sold WNYB-TV to Grant Broadcasting in 1996; the deal included TCT's acquisition of a dormant station on channel 26 in Jamestown, which became the new WNYB. In October 1996, Grant relaunched channel 49 as WNYO-TV, the Buffalo affiliate of The WB. Sinclair purchased the station in 2000, forming a duopoly with WUTV. The station produced its own local newscast from 2004 to 2006 as part of Sinclair's News Central service and then aired local news programming produced by Buffalo NBC affiliate WGRZ from 2006 to 2013. WNYO-TV is Buffalo's ATSC 3.0 (NextGen TV) station; in reciprocal arrangements, other Buffalo TV stations broadcast its subchannels on its behalf while it carries them in the new format.

== History ==
Channel 49 was added to Buffalo in lieu of channel 76 in February 1966 as part of a national overhaul of UHF channel allocations. The Beta Television Corporation obtained the construction permit that June, but despite attempts to sell the permit to Evans Broadcasting Corporation and New York City's WPIX, as well as a call sign change from WBAU-TV to WBBU-TV, the construction permit was deleted in January 1971.

=== Permitting ===
In 1979, interest coalesced again around channel 49, with applicants investigating the possibility of building a station to broadcast subscription television (STV) programming to paying customers. The first formal application filed with the Federal Communications Commission (FCC) came from Anax Corporation in June. A group of California investors doing business as the Great Erie County Telecasting Corporation made its application in October, followed by Channel 49 Buffalo Television, owned by an investor consortium from Baltimore, the minority-owned Unific Broadcasting Company, and Bison City Television 49, whose principals were primarily from St. Louis.

In 1981, the FCC designated the applications for comparative hearing; an FCC administrative law judge initially dismissed Bison City's application because of a failure to establish ownership, but the company successfully appealed. The field thinned considerably when Unific settled with Anax, Great Erie County, and Channel 49 Buffalo Television at the start of the hearing, leaving Unific and Bison City the only contenders for the permit. While Unific believed its local ownership and proposal to feature programming for the Black community in Buffalo made it a superior applicant, administrative law judge Walter C. Miller selected Bison City over Unific; the primary reason was that the latter company had asked for four amendments to its financial qualifications due to an inability to secure financing.

Bison City made some progress at building channel 49; it attempted to secure financing to go on air in 1984, and it even purchased some syndicated programs for the station to air. In 1985, the station secured a tower site in Colden over the objections of some local residents, and Bison City engaged the services of Media Central of Chattanooga, Tennessee, to build the facilities on its behalf, with the call sign WNYB-TV selected.

=== TVX: ownership but not operation ===
Lacking the financial resources to build the station, Bison City sold 80 percent interest in the WNYB construction permit to TVX Broadcast Group, a chain of independent TV stations, in 1985. TVX proceeded with construction, but a change in its business plan put the station on hold. In November 1986, TVX acquired five major-market independents from Taft Broadcasting. Including the under-construction WNYB-TV but excluding WNRW-TV in Winston-Salem, North Carolina, which it was selling, TVX already owned eight stations; the Taft deal put TVX one station over the 12-station limit of the time. TVX announced its intention to sell the WNYB-TV construction permit.

In May 1987, TVX reached a deal to sell WNYB-TV to a subsidiary of the First Allied Corporation, owned by Malcolm Glazer of Rochester. First Allied, in turn, announced that WNYB-TV would begin broadcasting on July 1 from the under-construction studios on Hertel Avenue. However, by late June, the sale to First Allied had fallen through, and the start of the station had been delayed until September to align with the start of the new television season as well as contracts for much of the new outlet's programming.

=== Sabres ownership ===
Needing to dispose of a ready-to-operate television station, TVX reportedly approached the Buffalo Sabres, the city's National Hockey League (NHL) franchise, among other groups. By then, the Sabres were the only U.S.-based NHL team whose games still aired on a major network affiliate—NBC affiliate WGRZ (channel 2). Although WGRZ had been the television home of the Sabres for a decade, its interest in renewing the contract waned because it had to preempt NBC programming for Sabres games. The Sabres formed Aud Enterprises (named for Buffalo Memorial Auditorium, popularly known as "the Aud") as a subsidiary to buy WNYB-TV; the purchase was announced on July 20, 1987. While WGRZ nominally had the right to match channel 49's offer to air the Sabres, the franchise deliberately made it difficult for channel 2 to do so by announcing plans to increase the number of televised games from 24 to 29. This cleared the way for the Sabres to effectively take their local telecasts in-house.

Even though Citadel Communications, owner of competing independent WUTV, alleged that Robert E. Rich Jr.'s minority ownership in the Sabres and two Buffalo radio stations violated cross-ownership rules, the FCC discarded Citadel's complaint and approved the transfer to Aud Enterprises on September 1, 1987. This cleared the way for WNYB-TV to sign on for the first time that evening. The deal formally closed in early November. The $4.63 million purchase price represented the value of the property, as construction permits could not be sold at a profit under FCC regulation. In addition to syndicated reruns and movies, as well as the Sabres, WNYB-TV aired broadcasts of Buffalo Bisons minor-league baseball games.

Fox and WUTV had a falling out in 1989 over the network's alleged underperformance in Buffalo compared to other markets. Another concern was that CHCH-TV in Hamilton, Ontario, aired Fox programming as well. Channel 29 believed this caused unnecessary duplication because of the proximity of Hamilton to Buffalo and CHCH's presence on Buffalo-area cable systems. Additionally, CHCH was able to invoke simultaneous substitution of WUTV during Fox programs it carried, cutting into channel 29's ability to sell advertising to its large Canadian audience. Fox moved its programming to WNYB-TV effective September 1, 1989; it did not have the Canadian cable carriage of WUTV and did not depend financially on advertising revenue from Canada. This also left it far less financially lucrative; in two years of operation, WNYB-TV lost an average of $1 million a year, and from launch to April 1990, the team had lost $6 million on the station.

=== Consolidation with WUTV; sale to TCT ===
In August 1989, Norman Lear's Act III Broadcasting moved to purchase WUTV from Citadel. However, it soon put the purchase on hold temporarily to negotiate a second acquisition: that of WNYB-TV's programming and facilities from the Sabres. Act III had pulled off a similar station consolidation the year before in Richmond, Virginia, when it bought WRLH-TV as well as the programming inventory of competitor WVRN-TV, which then shut down.

On August 29, 1989, Act III announced that it would buy WUTV along with WNYB-TV's programming and Fox affiliation, which would move to channel 29. Simultaneously, the Sabres announced that channel 49's transmitting facility would be sold to Tri-State Christian Television (TCT) of Marion, Illinois. In exchange, Sabres owners Seymour Knox and Robert Swados received equity in WUTV and would move their road games from channel 49 to channel 29, where they would have the exposure on Canadian cable systems that WNYB-TV had lacked since launching. The pair of deals would together reimburse the Sabres for their losses in running WNYB-TV. Approval of this set of transactions was not certain since Act III already owned WUHF in Rochester. Both stations' signals overlapped in Orleans and Genesee counties, and the overlap was large enough that Act III could not buy WNYB-TV without an FCC waiver. In a letter seeking such a waiver, Act III billed the deal as a "consolidation" of WUTV and WNYB-TV. Act III argued that the Buffalo market could not support what were essentially two independent stations (Note: Fox affiliates continued to be considered independent stations for a number of years after Fox launched, particularly as Fox did not program a full seven-night schedule early on. The Fox owned-and-operated stations did not leave the trade association for independent stations, INTV, until 1992.) due to its "fiercely competitive nature" and the difficulties of UHF broadcasting. It also faced objections from commercial stations WIVB-TV in Buffalo and WROC-TV in Rochester, as well as Stevens Media Services of Buffalo, which decried the monopolizing of the UHF television market and took issue with the overlap between the stations.

In June 1990, the FCC approved the WUTV sale to Act III, granting a one-year waiver to Act III to allow it to sell off WUHF; it had already granted the WNYB-TV sale to TCT in November 1989. WNYB-TV's programming, including Fox shows, was immediately merged onto WUTV's schedule, and TCT took over channel 49 on June 28, 1990, airing Christian ministry programming.

=== Grant ownership ===
The structure of the purchase of WNYB-TV by TCT incentivized Tri-State Christian Television to continue the station as a non-profit for five years by including a series of sliding scale payments to the Sabres that increased if the station began accepting commercial advertising or was sold to a commercial broadcaster. With the five years up, in December 1995, TCT made a deal with Grant Broadcasting. The deal would see Grant buy channel 49 from TCT, which would receive $12 million and the construction permit for WTJA (channel 26) in Jamestown, which had last broadcast in 1991.

Speculation immediately pointed to Grant using channel 49 to bring The WB to Buffalo, which was confirmed in June 1996. While TCT began the process of building a new physical plant to bring channel 26 back into service and moved the WNYB call letters there, Grant returned channel 49 to commercial broadcasting as WNYO-TV in October 1996. The Sabres also briefly returned to channel 49, airing a 10-game package simulcast from Empire Sports Network in the 1997–98 season. However, channel 49 could not live up to the O in its new call sign, for Ontario. The Sabres had made the deal in part because the station had hoped to be added to southern Ontario cable systems beginning in January 1998. However, that approval never came. In April 1998, the Canadian Radio-television and Telecommunications Commission denied permission for the companies to add WNYO-TV to their lineups, siding with Toronto stations in finding that the addition of another non-Canadian service would deprive Canadian broadcasters of revenue. Grant Broadcasting expanded its relationship with The WB in 1999, when it ceased airing its programming on Superstation WGN nationally, by obtaining WB secondary affiliations for three of the company's other stations.

=== Sinclair ownership ===
Grant Broadcasting sold WNYO-TV to Sinclair Broadcast Group—the descendant of the original Baltimore group that had sought the channel in 1979—for $51.5 million in 2000. The company had previously reportedly turned down an offer from Granite Broadcasting, owner of ABC affiliate WKBW-TV. This formed a duopoly with WUTV and came after Sinclair had previously backed out of a plan to acquire channel 23 in the city. Unlike with channel 23, in acquiring WNYO-TV, it received an existing station with a building, programming, and staff. The deal also allowed Sinclair to program channel 49 with shows it had purchased with the intent of airing them on channel 23.

In 2006, when The WB and UPN merged to form The CW, Sinclair first elected to affiliate with MyNetworkTV, a new network started by Fox Television Stations, over The CW. On March 2, ten days after the network's existence was announced on February 22, Sinclair affiliated 17 stations it owned or managed, including WNYO-TV, with the network.

In 2023, WNYO reached an agreement to once again become the local broadcast home of the Buffalo Bisons, the Triple-A affiliate of the Toronto Blue Jays.

== Newscasts ==
In 2003, WNYO-TV announced it would begin airing a 10 p.m. local newscast utilizing Sinclair's hybrid News Central format; a local anchor read stories from Buffalo, while national news and weather were provided from Sinclair's corporate office in Hunt Valley, Maryland. The hour-long program debuted on August 16, 2004. The primary competition for the newscast was WNLO, which aired a newscast produced by WIVB-TV; WUTV, unlike most Fox affiliates, had not bothered to begin airing local news programming because it aired successful syndicated shows in the 10 p.m. hour. The station had toyed with airing such a program since 2000. The program was later shortened to 30 minutes.

In January 2006, Sinclair ended its standalone news operation at WPGH-TV in Pittsburgh and triggered speculation about the future of the WNYO-TV newscast. The program was then wound down at the end of March, and WGRZ began producing a new half-hour news and sports program for the station in late April. The half-hour consisted of two programs: 2 News on 49, a 10-minute local newscast recapping the day's top stories, and Western New York Sports Zone, a 20-minute in-depth sports show. (Note: The news portion was originally to be known as 2 on NYO 10 at 10.) The change brought only a slight improvement in local ratings. The sports portion was later downsized, which did lead to a ratings increase.

The WGRZ-produced newscast moved to sister station WUTV on April 8, 2013, trading places with the reruns of Seinfeld that had aired in that time slot on WUTV since the mid-1990s. WNYO-TV continued to air news programming, as a rebroadcast of the 6 a.m. hour of WGRZ's morning newscast aired weekdays at 7 a.m. on WNYO-TV, which began on April 8; plans called for this rebroadcast to also move to WUTV at some point in the future. WGRZ continued to produce the newscast for air on channel 29 until July 2021, when Sinclair opted to produce the newscast itself using presentation resources at co-owned stations in nearby markets.

National news and current affairs programming on the station consists of Sinclair-produced The National Desk and Full Measure with Sharyl Attkisson as well as The Armstrong Williams Show.

== Technical information and subchannels ==
The station's ATSC 1.0 channels are carried on the multiplexed signals of other Buffalo television stations:

Subchannels provided by WNYO-TV (ATSC 1.0)
Subchannel	Res.	Short name	Programming	ATSC 1.0 host
49.1	720p	WNYO-MY	Main WNYO-TV programming	WUTV
49.2	480i	Nest	The Nest	WKBW-TV
49.3	480i	Comet	Comet	WGRZ
49.4	480i	GetTV	Great	WIVB-TV

=== Analog-to-digital conversion ===
WNYO-TV ended regular programming on its analog signal, over UHF channel 49, on June 12, 2009, the official date on which full-power television stations in the United States transitioned from analog to digital broadcasts under federal mandate. The station's digital signal relocated from its pre-transition UHF channel 34 to channel 49.

=== ATSC 3.0 lighthouse ===
WNYO-TV is Buffalo's ATSC 3.0 (NextGen TV) lighthouse station and hosts itself and the Big Four stations in the market in that format. The station converted on March 22, 2021. WNYO-TV's transmitter is located on Whitehaven Road (near I-190) in Grand Island, New York.

Subchannels of WNYO-TV (ATSC 3.0)
Subchannel	Res.	Short name	Programming
2.1	1080i	WGRZ	NBC (WGRZ)
4.1	1080i	WIVB	CBS (WIVB-TV)
7.1	720p	WKBW	ABC (WKBW-TV)
29.1	720p	WUTV	Fox (WUTV)
29.10	1080p	T2	T2
29.11	1080p	PBTV	Pickleballtv
29.20		GMLOOP	GameLoop
29.21		ROXi	ROXi
49.1	720p	WNYO	Main WNYO-TV programming

Subchannel broadcast with digital rights management
Subchannel streamed via the Internet
