= WBUF-TV =

Television station in Buffalo, New York (1953–1958)

- Buffalo, New York; United States
- Channels: Analog: 17 (UHF)

Programming
- Affiliations: ABC (1953–1956); CBS (1953–1954); DuMont (1953–1955); NBC (1956–1958)

History
- First air date: August 17, 1953
- Last air date: October 1, 1958
- Call sign meaning: "Buffalo"

Technical information
- ERP: 1,000 kW
- HAAT: 686 ft (209 m)
- Transmitter coordinates: 42°57′14″N 78°52′37″W

WBUF-TV (Note: The call sign was WBUF, no suffix, from 1956 to 1958 under NBC ownership.) was a television station that broadcast on ultra high frequency (UHF) channel 17 in Buffalo, New York, United States. It broadcast from August 17, 1953, to February 1955 and again from March 1955 until the morning of October 1, 1958.

The first of two early UHF television stations in Buffalo, the station—like others in its day—struggled to gain traction because of coverage and reception issues specific to UHF stations and not experienced by their very high frequency (VHF) counterparts. The station went on the air under the aegis of local owners. After its initial shutdown in February 1955, it was bought by NBC in part as an experiment hoping to mitigate the issues ailing UHF broadcasting across the country and also because revised ownership rules allowed station groups to purchase additional UHF stations. In August 1956, all NBC programs moved to WBUF, which at the same time moved into a new showplace studio facility. Despite high UHF set conversion rates (as sets had to be converted to receive UHF in the days before the All-Channel Receiver Act) and a high-power installation, WBUF was generally a failure—NBC ratings were far lower in Buffalo than in most other cities, and the station lost money—and the approval of a third VHF station for the city signaled WBUF-TV's final demise in 1958.

WBUF left a legacy in Buffalo of notable broadcast personalities in and out of the market, including Rick Azar and Mac McGarry, as well as a substantial physical plant. The channel 17 transmission facility was donated to start WNED-TV, Buffalo's educational TV station, which began broadcasting in March 1959. The studio has been occupied since 1960 by WBEN-TV (now known as WIVB-TV).

== First era ==
=== Prehistory ===
The Federal Communications Commission (FCC) declared a freeze on television station applications in 1948, during which time 70 new channels were created in the ultra high frequency (UHF) band to meet the demand for television service that previously only had 12 very high frequency (VHF) channels. In 1951, Buffalo was initially awarded channels 17 and 23 (the latter for noncommercial use), and channels 2 and 7 were also placed in the region in addition to Buffalo's only pre-freeze station, WBEN-TV (channel 4).

After the lifting of the freeze in 1952, the FCC received applications from all over the United States, and the two new VHF channels each met with multiple applicants that would require comparative hearings to sort out; further, Buffalo was low in the national priority order for hearing applications. Buffalo's two UHF channels did not attract the same interest, and it was channel 17 that led to the first grant of a new TV station in Buffalo since the freeze when the commission granted a construction permit to the Chautauqua Broadcasting Company on December 18, 1952. The firm had 18 stockholders, headed by Sherwin Grossman and Gary L. Cohen, each in families with other business interests; two others had withdrawn in August. Grossman had initially planned on establishing a television station in Jamestown and had filed for channel 58 there, but he was convinced by a potential investor to seek a station in the much more populous Buffalo area.

The transmitter would be erected atop the Marine Trust Company building in downtown Buffalo, while a studio site had not been selected when the FCC granted the construction permit. Days later, a second uncontested application for a UHF channel was granted to the Buffalo-Niagara Television Corporation for channel 59.

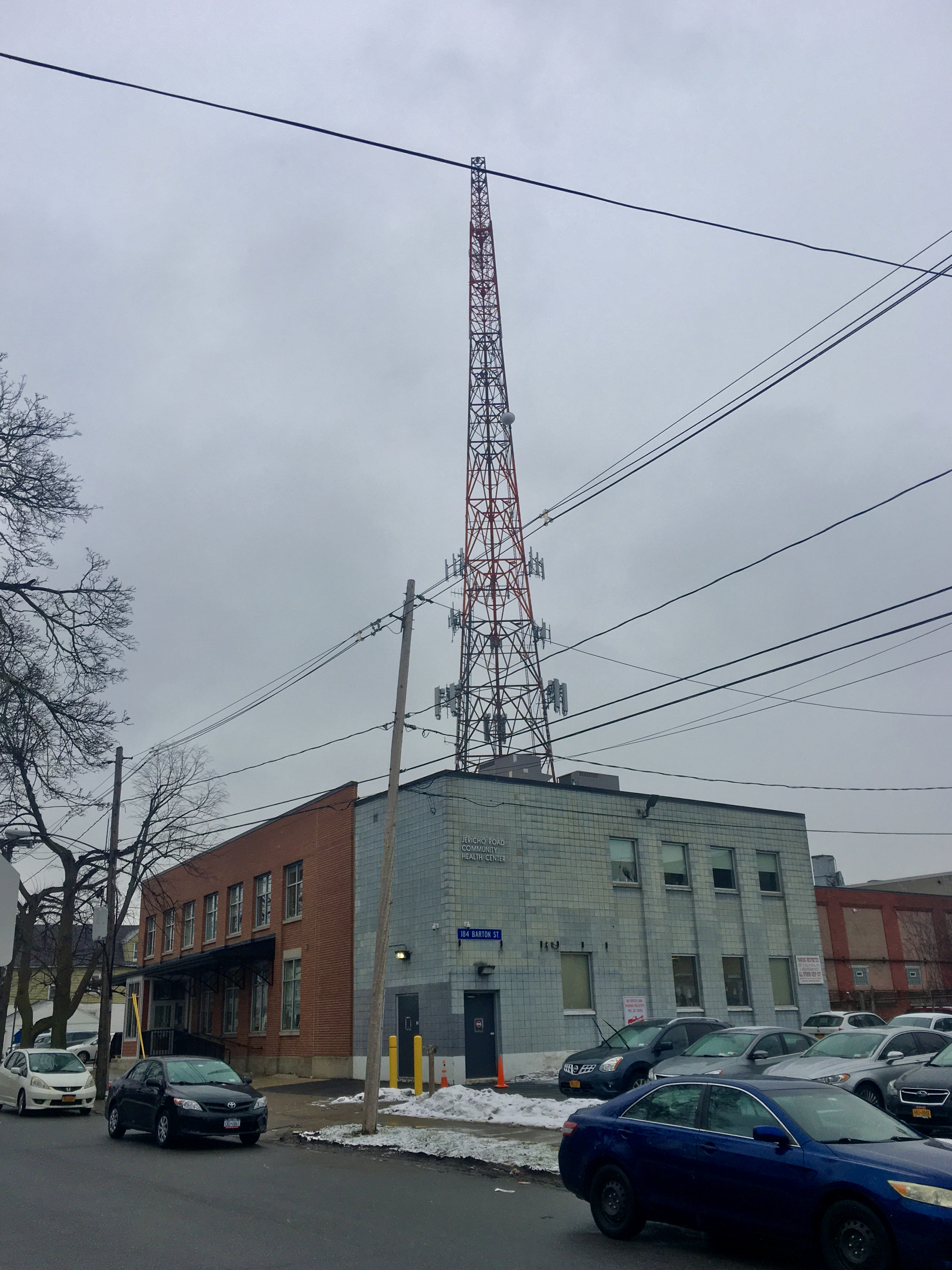
The WBUF-TV studios on Barton Street were later shared with, and eventually solely used by, WGR-TV, Buffalo's second VHF station.

Taking the call letters WBUF-TV (and with Chautauqua changing its name to WBUF-TV Inc.), the station filed in April 1953 to locate at a facility at 184 Barton Street and to erect the transmitter tower there instead of on the Marine Trust Company building. Work then began on facilities with an August 15 deadline, which Grossman pledged would not be missed "by many hours", and on erection of a 421.5-foot (128.5 m) tower. A South Carolina firm was responsible for the latter; a Confederate flag was used to mark the high point reached, and it was left atop the finished mast for a time as a dare by one of the steeplejacks. The transmitter arrived on August 14; three days later, on August 17, WBUF-TV began broadcasting as Buffalo's second television station; audio troubles marred the first night on air. It originally aired programs from ABC, CBS, and the DuMont Television Network; DuMont Laboratories supplied the transmitter, its first 1,000-watt UHF unit. A second UHF station briefly joined the Buffalo scene on September 27 when channel 59 was activated as WBES-TV, but it folded on December 18.

=== A fight for a fourth VHF channel and temporary shutdown ===
Looming over the station's existence from the start was the first of two hearings for a new VHF television station in Buffalo, on channel 2. WBUF-TV attempted to intervene in the channel 2 hearing, citing economic injury and loss of advertisers and network shows that would result with a second VHF outlet on the air, but was denied the opportunity by the FCC in January 1954; every commissioner bar Frieda Hennock voted against allowing WBUF-TV to become part of the proceeding. Meanwhile, facilities improvements continued. In August 1954, effective radiated power was increased to 229,000 watts, a twelvefold increase on the way to Grossman's goal: transmitting the UHF maximum of one million watts. It also joined a regional network exchanging local programs alongside WSEE-TV in Erie, Pennsylvania, and WVET-TV in Rochester.

Despite this, the station's economic picture dimmed considerably after WGR-TV began telecasting August 14—sharing the Barton Street building of WBUF-TV, which it had agreed to lease to WGR-TV owner Niagara Frontier Amusement Company in January. WGR-TV became the new NBC affiliate, and CBS programs moved to WBEN-TV. In October, major cutbacks were made in the station's local program production, with WBUF-TV becoming dependent on network shows and movies and eight employees being laid off. This was to continue until the FCC ruled on a petition made by Grossman to change the Buffalo allocations of channels 2, 4, and 7 to 2, 4, 5, and 8, thereby giving the city a fourth VHF channel, in expectation that the commission would make a ruling in the near future. In February 1955, ahead of an expected ruling, Grossman announced that the station would continue "as long as there is any concrete hope of bringing a fourth [VHF] TV service to Western New York".

However, when the FCC failed to rule on the four-VHF proposal in its February 23, 1955, meeting, Grossman could no longer afford to keep WBUF-TV in service, and the station went off the air that night. From startup to December 31, 1954, WBUF-TV had made a net loss of $236,324.42 (equivalent to $2.24 million in 2025 dollars).

== NBC ownership ==
=== Acquisition ===
On March 11, 1955, Grossman and Sylvester "Pat" Weaver jointly announced that NBC would purchase WBUF-TV. NBC, however, would not be able to put its programming on channel 17 immediately, as WGR-TV's NBC affiliation contract did not end until August 1956. A basic ABC affiliation agreement was signed at the same time as the sale deal was reached; NBC painted itself as the savior of UHF television in Buffalo, hoping the purchase would have beneficial implications for the development of UHF. The $312,500 deal would make NBC the first network to own the maximum complement of five VHF and two UHF television stations, after it had earlier agreed to purchase WKNB-TV in New Britain, Connecticut.

Grossman and Cohen retained ownership of the Barton Street studio to lease to WGR-TV, and NBC began scouting for sites to relocate WBUF-TV; meanwhile, WGR-TV announced it would fight to keep its NBC affiliation. In July, the FCC indicated that the deal likely would necessitate a hearing after WGR-TV lodged a formal protest; in a response, NBC noted that the complaints were not germane for a hearing and that the purchase would not create antitrust issues, and it also said that if the sale were to languish past the end of the year, WBUF-TV would go off the air again. Meanwhile, ABC shows slowly returned to channel 17, while some NBC shows also appeared because WGR-TV was dropping them as part of its dispute with the network.

The commission approved the purchase in September 1955, though continued protests and a filing in appeals court by WGR-TV held up completion of the sale until December 30, when the appeals court dismissed the case.

Actions taken by original owner Grossman while running WBUF-TV would rebound on his efforts to be selected to build a new TV station in Miami in the early 1960s. In September 1960, an FCC examiner handed down an initial decision awarding the South Florida Amusement Company, a company majority-owned by Grossman, a construction permit for channel 6. A competing applicant alleged that Grossman had ordered program logs from 1955, immediately prior to the NBC takeover, not be made available to anyone; that WBUF-TV had aired a bingo program in contravention of the Code of Practices for Television Broadcasters and never delivered promised prizes; and that it aired excessive commercials during movies. While the FCC initially did not admit the evidence, the uncovering of new data led the commission to reopen the record in the first week of 1962, with new charges that letters from Buffalo civic leaders supporting the addition of VHF stations there had been forged. Despite the initial nod and after being cleared of allegations of wrongdoing, Grossman was allowed to withdraw from contention in November 1963, paving the way for the other applicant, Coral Television Company, to receive the construction permit.

=== The rebuild ===
The same day as the sale was consummated, NBC announced its plans for WBUF, including a schedule of new local programs and the relocation of NBC network shows to channel 17 in August 1956; a new facility capable of eventual expansion to broadcast one million watts; and the construction of interim and permanent studios at 2077 Elmwood Avenue, with the move from Barton Street to take place immediately. The station was off the air from December 31 until January 9, when it returned to operation from the interim facilities on Elmwood; the Barton Street site was then purchased outright by WGR-TV. Intensive promotion of UHF set conversion began; where just 25 percent of sets were equipped for UHF in January 1956, 52.9 percent were by October.

The first phase of the permanent, $1.5 million studio center was completed in time for WBUF to become the NBC station in Buffalo on August 14, while transmitter power was increased to 489,000 watts in October, and a formal dedication was held on October 11, with a national telecast on Today featuring Dave Garroway and J. Fred Muggs; president Robert Sarnoff had intended to visit but was ill. The new studio was NBC's first to be automated; paper tape controlled nearly all station functions, and operators were only needed to handle the loading of film and slide projectors. Much was riding on the proposal for NBC; Sarnoff had earlier floated the idea that groups could own more than seven stations if the additional outlets were UHF, and Buffalo at the time was the nation's 14th-largest television market. In September 1957, WBUF completed its last transmitter upgrade and began broadcasting with one million watts.

Even though it was a UHF station with a generally economical operation, in terms of personnel, WBUF was operated along the lines of other NBC owned-and-operated outlets. Several faces seen on channel 17 went on to lengthy broadcasting careers in and out of Buffalo. Longtime Buffalo sportscaster Rick Azar, later of WKBW-TV, did sports and weather at WBUF. Broadcaster Dave Roberts (then still known as Dave Thomas) worked at WBUF-TV from 1956 to 1958—his first on-air appearance coming on Christmas Eve—before later stints at WKBW-TV and WPVI-TV in Philadelphia. Several personalities originated from elsewhere in the NBC chain: Mac McGarry, who came from NBC's WRC-TV in Washington, D.C., was a weatherman in Buffalo; he returned to Washington after WBUF folded.

=== Shutdown and disposal of assets ===
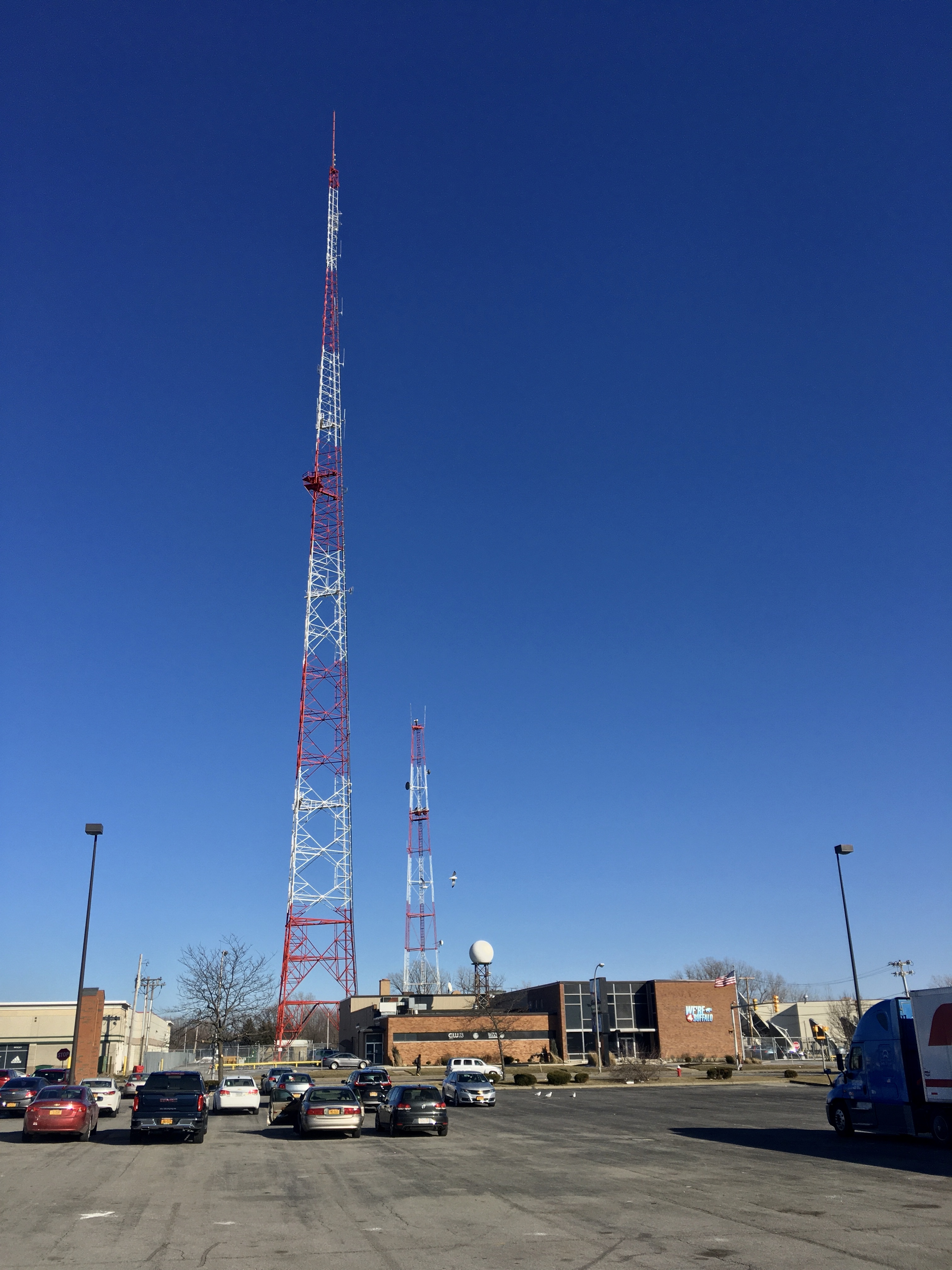
The former WBUF studios on Elmwood Avenue were purchased by WBEN radio and television and expanded; WIVB-TV continues to broadcast from the facility.

On June 10, 1958, NBC announced that WBUF would be shut down on September 30, with the award of channel 7 (eventually built as WKBW-TV) imminent; the network believed it had no chance of competing with three VHF stations, ratings for NBC were far lower in Buffalo than in other comparable markets nationally and lower than at NBC's other UHF station in Connecticut, and WBUF had continued to lose money—an estimated $1 million (equivalent to $8.55 million in 2025 dollars)—under NBC ownership. This contrasted with optimistic projections two years earlier by Charles Denny, operations manager for the NBC-owned stations, that it would be profitable sometime in 1957. As a result, WGR-TV would become the new NBC affiliate for Buffalo on October 1, with that station airing NBC and ABC programs, and the Elmwood Avenue studios would be offered for sale. The closure came at 1:05 a.m. on October 1, with station general manager Charles C. Bevis Jr. regretting that the station was unable to obtain the desired third of the Buffalo market even though 82 percent of Buffalo-area television sets were equipped to receive UHF. Sturgis Hedrick of the Buffalo Evening News remarked on the occasion of WBUF's closure that the station was a "good friend" with quality network and local programming.

The news was read in industry trades as a dire sign of the troubles facing UHF stations nationwide. Broadcasting magazine commented that the news of WBUF's folding put UHF television at "a new crossroads", stirring a debate about whether VHF and UHF channels should co-exist in a given area. For Television Digest, the decision proved "with utmost finality" that a UHF station could not compete in a market that had two VHF outlets and was "a blow to UHF morale". Frontier Television, which had proposed to start a second UHF station in Buffalo to be known as WNYT and had reached a deal with NBC to use the former interim WBUF studio, dropped its plans and announced it would seek a VHF channel, with its president noting that 300,000 television set owners had paid for UHF converters that would soon be worthless in the area. CBS, which had similarly attempted to make a go of a UHF owned-and-operated station with WHCT in Hartford, Connecticut, announced in October that it would unwind that experiment and affiliate with a VHF station in that city; a column in Variety noted that "CBS probably figured 'If NBC could do it in Buffalo, why can't we do it in Hartford?'".

Bevis remained in Buffalo for four months after the closure to supervise the disposal of WBUF's extensive physical plant and transmission assets. The taller of two towers and former interim building were sold to WGR-TV, while a shorter tower and the studio building were sold to WBEN. The WBEN radio stations and WBEN-TV, now WIVB-TV, made extensive renovations, including a two-story office addition, and moved into the facility in January 1960; the portion built for WBUF housed the radio studios. WBEN also purchased the 1921-vintage fire engine "Engine No. 17", renamed "Old No. 4", that had been used by WBUF for promotional purposes and as part of a fire safety awareness program.

WGR and WBEN, along with NBC, also ensured that there would still be a channel 17 in Buffalo, though not on a commercial basis. In February 1959, a consortium of educational leaders organized as the Western New York Educational Television Association applied for a new construction permit for the station, having secured the temporary use of equipment of both stations at Elmwood and the long-term use of soon-to-be-vacated WGR facilities in the Hotel Lafayette, as well as a pledge for $115,000 (equivalent to $970,092 in 2025 dollars) in equipment from NBC. The FCC granted the group a construction permit on March 4, and WNED-TV began broadcasting on March 30, making it the first educational TV station in the state of New York. It broadcast from the former WBUF-TV antenna, which was moved to the Lafayette that summer, while WGR radio relocated to the Elmwood site.
