= Lotas =

Lotas may refer to:

- John Lotas (1920–1995), American theater producer
- Warren Lotas, clothing company

== See also ==
- Lota
- Lotta Lotass (born 1964), Swedish writer
