= The Bomb (film) =

2015 American documentary film

- DVD cover
- Genre: Documentary film
- Written by: Rushmore DeNooyer
- Directed by: Rushmore DeNooyer
- Narrated by: Jonathan Adams
- Theme music composer: Todd Hutchisen (music editor)
- Country of origin: United States
- Original language: English
- No. of episodes: One-episode (about two-hours)

Production
- Producer: Lone Wolf Media
- Editors: Doug Quade; Ryan Shepheard
- Running time: 114:39 minutes

Original release
- Network: PBS
- Release: July 28, 2015

The Bomb is a 2015 American documentary film about the history of nuclear weapons, from theoretical scientific considerations at the very beginning, to their first use on August 6, 1945, to their global political implications in the present day. The film was written and directed by Rushmore DeNooyer for PBS. The project took a year and a half to complete, since much of the film footage and images were only recently declassified by the United States Department of Defense.

According to DeNooyer, “It wouldn't take very many bombs to really change life on Earth, ... The idea that there are thousands of them sitting around is pretty scary. I don't think people today realize that. They don't think about it. I don't think they are scared. But in a way, they should be.” Mark Dawidziak, of the Cleveland Plain Dealer, summarized the film as follows: "The Bomb moves swiftly to cover Hiroshima and Nagasaki, the Cold War, the arms race, the Red Scare, the witch hunt, the Cuban Missile Crisis, test-ban treaties, the "Star Wars" initiative, the anti-nuke movement, the collapse of the Soviet Union and the rise of new nuclear threats." According to historian Richard Rhodes, “The invention [of 'The Bomb'] was a millennial change in human history: for the first time, we were now capable of our own destruction, as a species.”

== Participants ==
The documentary film is narrated by Jonathan Adams and includes the following participants (alphabetized by last name):

- Jonathan Adams (narrator)
- John Andersen (former Nuclear Weapons Engineer)
- Hal Behl (aeronautical engineer; Manhattan Project)
- Walter J. Boyne (former U.S. Strategic Air Command pilot)
- Alan Carr (historian; The Forgotten Physicist)
- Lynn Eden (historian; Whole World on Fire)
- John Hopkins (former Director, Nuclear Weapons Program)
- Lilli Hornig (chemist; Manhattan Project)
- Sergei Khrushchev (historian; Khrushchev in Power)
- Amy Knight (historian; How The Cold War Began)
- Charles Loeber (former Nuclear Weapons Engineer)
- Elaine Tyler May (historian; Homeward Bound)
- Glen McDuff (former Nuclear Weapons Engineer)
- Laura McEnaney (historian; Civil Defense Begins at Home)
- Robert Norris (historian; Racing for the Bomb)
- William Perry (former U.S. Secretary of Defense)
- Roger Rasmussen (retired U.S. Army engineer; Trinity witness)
- Richard Rhodes (historian; The Making of the Atomic Bomb)
- Svetlana Savranskaya (historian; The Soviet Cuban Missile Crisis)
- Martin Sherwin (historian; American Prometheus)
- George Shultz (former U.S. Secretary of State)
- Lester Tenney (American POW)
- Jonathan M. Weisgall (author; Operation Crossroads)

== Reception ==
Pulitzer Prize-winning American conservative journalist and commentator Dorothy Rabinowitz, of the Wall Street Journal, writes, "Documentaries commemorating the atomic bomb’s first use are rarely deficient in drama, and this overstuffed yet altogether gripping work is no exception. Its assortment of uninhibitedly blunt commentators doesn’t hurt either." According to David Hinckley of the Daily News, "...some of the most powerful moments [of the film] focus on people, not technology." Robert Lloyd of the Los Angeles Times noted, "...much of this tale, as accidental as it also feels inevitable, is one of individual egos warping history, of scientists at war with politicians, of evil scientists at war with good ones, of wounded bureaucrats out for revenge." Verne Gay of Newsday concludes, "The Bomb is a decent overview but with insufficient analysis or perspective ..." Mark Dawidziak, of the Cleveland Plain Dealer, reports, "[The film is] part history lesson, part science class, part sociological study, part political thriller and part cautionary tale ... " Neil Genzlinger of the New York Times observes, "The arms race is dutifully chronicled and the anti-nuke movement too, but only in its final minutes does the program get around to noting that nuclear bombs are still with us and that countries other than the United States and Russia have them. There’s a brief suggestion that if India and Pakistan ever go at it the whole world will suffer from collateral damage, but the thought doesn’t linger. It’s as if The Bomb doesn’t want to intrude on the present by reminding us that the genie released 70 years ago [on August 6, 1945] is still at large."

=== Related films ===
At the 67th Berlin International Film Festival, the experimental 2016 film the bomb, by Kevin Ford, Smriti Keshari and Eric Schlosser, was premiered. The film featured archival footage about the atomic bomb, along with live music by The Acid.

== See also ==
- Copenhagen (play)
- History of the anti-nuclear movement
- History of nuclear weapons
- International Atomic Energy Agency
- International Day against Nuclear Tests
- J. Robert Oppenheimer
- List of nuclear tests
- List of nuclear weapons
- Manhattan Project
- Oppenheimer (2023 film)
- The Mystery of Matter (PBS film)
- Trinity (nuclear test)
