= Mark Dawidziak =

American author and critic (born 1956)

- Born: Mark Daniel Dawidziak; September 7, 1956 (age 70); Huntington, New York, U.S.
- Occupation: Writer

Mark Daniel Dawidziak (born September 7, 1956) is an American author and critic.

== Early life ==
Dawidziak was born in Huntington, New York, on September 7, 1956. He is a graduate of Harborfields High School, class of 1974.

== Journalism career ==
A journalism graduate of George Washington University, Dawidziak has worked as a theater, film and television critic since 1979. He started his journalism career in the Washington, D.C. bureaus of Knight-Ridder Newspapers and the Associated Press. In 1983, after stints as the arts and entertainment editor at the Bristol Herald-Courier in Bristol, Virginia and the Kingsport Times-Times in Kingsport, Tennessee, he moved to the Akron Beacon Journal in Akron, Ohio as the newspaper's TV critic (and later film critic). He is currently the television critic for The Plain Dealer in Cleveland, Ohio.

== Television histories ==
Dawidziak has written two non-fiction books about TV characters: The Columbo Phile: A Casebook (The Mysterious Press, 1989), a history of Peter Falk's Lt. Columbo, and The Night Stalker Companion: A 30th Anniversary Tribute (Pomegranate Press, 1997), a history of the Carl Kolchak character played by Darren McGavin in two TV movies and the 1974-75 ABC series. His 2003 book, Horton Foote's The Shape of the River: The Lost Teleplay About Mark Twain (Applause Books) details the 1960 Playhouse 90 production on CBS.

== Mark Twain studies ==
In addition to Horton Foote's The Shape of the River: The Lost Teleplay About Mark Twain (Applause Books, 2003), he assembled Mark Twain's thoughts on writing and the writing process for Mark My Words: Mark Twain on Writing (St. Martin's Press, 1996). He also teamed with noted Twain scholar R. Kent Rasmussen for the chapter Mark Twain on the Screen published in A Companion to Mark Twain (Blackwell Publishing, 2005, edited by Peter Messent and Louis J. Budd). He has twice been the visiting Twain scholar giving the Trouble Begins at Eight lecture at Elmira College's Center for Mark Twain Studies. He has presented academic papers at four consecutive State of Mark Twain Studies conferences (held every four years in August at Elmira College): on The Shape of the River in 2001; on the many similarities between Twain and Charles Dickens in 2005; on the importance of Hal Holbrook's one-man show, Mark Twain Tonight!, in 2009; and on director-producer Will Vinton's Claymation film The Adventures of Mark Twain in 2013.

== Jim Tully ==
Dawidziak and Paul J. Bauer are the authors of the first full-length biography of writer Jim Tully. Titled Jim Tully: American Writer, Irish Rover, Hollywood Brawler, it was published by Kent State University Press in 2011 with a foreword by Ken Burns.

== Horror ==
In addition to writing two non-fiction books about the Carl Kolchak character – Night Stalking: A 20th Anniversary Kolchak Companion (Image, 1991) and The Night Stalker Companion: A 30th Anniversary Tribute (Pomegranate Press, 1997), Dawidziak has edited three collections of works by Richard Matheson, all published by Gauntlet Press: Richard Matheson's Kolchak Scripts (2003), Bloodlines: Richard Matheson's Dracula, I Am Legend, and Other Vampires Stories (2006) and Richard Matheson's Censored and Unproduced I Am Legend Screenplay (2012). His work in the horror field includes a 1994 novel (The Kolchak Papers: Grave Secrets), a play (The Tell-Tale Play), short stories, comic book scripts and the non-fiction book The Bedside, Bathtub and Armchair Companion to Dracula (Continuum, 2008).

== Acting on stage ==
Dawidziak met his wife, actress Sara Showman, through the stage. In 2002, they founded the Largely Literary Theater Company, a touring troupe dedicated to promoting literacy, literature and live theater. The company's artistic director, he frequently appears in Largely Literary productions as Mark Twain and Charles Dickens. His two-act adaptation of Twain material, Twain By Three, was performed at the 103rd Annual International Dickens Fellowship Conference (held at Case Western Reserve University in Cleveland, Ohio). His play The Mystery of Dashiell Hammett was premiered as part of Big Read initiative at Hiram College in 2009. His other plays include a two-act adaptation of Dickens' A Christmas Carol for three actors.

== Series of lectures ==
Dawidziak is currently teaching part-time as an adjunct professor at Kent State University, in addition to writing for The Plain Dealer. He teaches the Reviewing Film and Television and Vampires in Film and Television courses. His first class was in the spring of 2009.

He frequently lectures and gives talks on Mark Twain, Charles Dickens, television and vampires. On October 23, 2009, Dawidziak appeared at the Kent Stage, in Kent Ohio, with the lecture "Haunted Theaters, Dracula & Me".
