= Warren Lotas =

American streetwear company

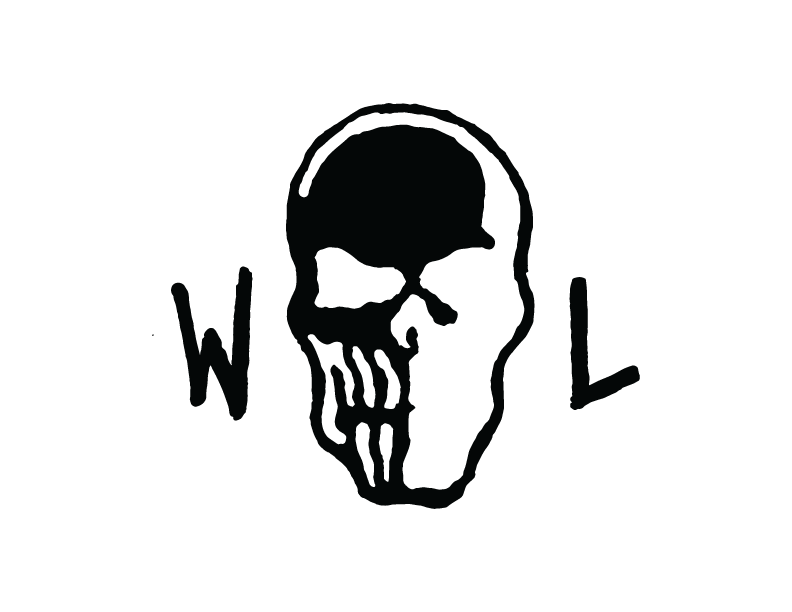
- Company type: Private
- Industry: Streetwear
- Founded: 2018
- Headquarters: Los Angeles, CA
- Area served: North America, South America, Europe, Asia, Australasia
- Products: Clothing, Shoes, Accessories
- Website: https://warrenlotas.com/

Warren Lotas is a Los Angeles–based streetwear company. Started in 2014 and incorporated in 2018, Warren Lotas is best known for its graphic-heavy T-shirts and hoodies. While most items are sold via E-commerce, Warren Lotas also has a retail store location in Los Angeles, and its clothing can be found in luxury department stores around the world.

== History ==
The Warren Lotas brand, created by its eponymous designer, began in Boston under the name BILL by Warren Lotas. Designing from his college dorm room, Lotas became interested in DIY punk style, distinguishing himself with signature skeletal motifs and handwritten calligraphy, as well by applying unique treatments such as slashing, distressing, and burning, to reappropriated garments.

In 2020, Warren Lotas was involved in a trademark infringement lawsuit with Nike over a reinterpreted SB Dunk Low. The parties settled claims shortly after the suit became public. The case was recognized for its role in the discussion as to what extent a bootleg sneaker is a knockoff versus homage.

Since 2021, Warren Lotas has collaborated with the NBA on numerous arena-exclusive clothing releases.

In 2022, Warren Lotas opened its first flagship retail location in West Hollywood, Los Angeles.

== Style ==
Warren Lotas’s style is most widely recognized for its graphic-heavy designs inspired by punk, motorcyclist, and Western cinema aesthetics. Flames and skeletal figures are common motifs across many designs. Corresponding to some styles are fictional narratives, either digital or written on physical cards, that contextualize designs and the characters within them, as exemplified by the “Port Royal” theme of the Warren Lotas website.

Warren Lotas is also known for a sports catalogue via partnerships with the NBA, NFL, and college sports.

Recalling the handcrafted origins of the brand, Warren Lotas produces handmade, one-of-one pieces that are often worn by celebrity Hip-Hop artists or athletes.

=== Collaborations ===
Warren Lotas regularly collaborates with musical artists, business-to-consumer companies, and other streetwear brands.

Most notably, Warren Lotas collaborated with The Weeknd in 2019 on an exclusive XO collection. The two teamed up again for Super Bowl LV in 2021. Warren Lotas also collaborated with Dodge in 2021 on an SRT collection. In 2022, Warren Lotas and Bad Bunny collaborated on Un Verano Sin Ti-themed T-shirts and hoodies.

Warren Lotas has held numerous sports-themed releases in collaboration with the NBA, NFL, and Collegiate Licensing Company.
