= John Lotas =

American producer (1920–1995)

- Born: September 14, 1920; Springfield, Massachusetts, U.S.
- Died: August 18, 1995 (aged 74); Austin, Texas, U.S.
- Occupation: Producer
- Children: 3

John Lotas (September 14, 1920 – August 18, 1995) was the original producer of Hal Holbrook’s “Mark Twain Tonight!” in New York City.

== Biography ==
John Lotas was born on September 14, 1920, in Springfield, Massachusetts.

Lotas discovered Hal Holbrook at The Lambs in Manhattan in the 1950s. Lotas was elected to The Lambs in 1953. In 1959, he presented Holbrook's Mark Twain Tonight! at the 44th Street Theatre in New York City. The show ran for 174 performances. It later reopened on Broadway. Lotas was a voice-over talent for Paramount News and was an original follower and contributor to the Sri Atmananda Memorial School (Austin, Texas). For many years he headed Lotas Productions, a recording studio and production company in New York City.

Lotas had a son and two daughters, Christopher, Sasha and Amanda. He died on August 18, 1995, after being struck by a car in Austin, Texas.
