= Mark Twain Tonight! =

Theatrical presentation by Hal Holbrook

- Written by: writings and speeches of Mark Twain arranged and edited by Hal Holbrook
- Characters: Mark Twain
- Genre: monologue

Premiere
- Date: 1954
- Place: Lock Haven University of Pennsylvania

Mark Twain Tonight! is a one-man play devised by Hal Holbrook, in which he depicted Mark Twain giving a dramatic recitation selected from several of Twain's writings, with an emphasis on the comic ones.

== Background ==
The recitation's genesis was a show that Holbrook performed with his first wife, actress Ruby Elaine Johnston Holbrook, in which she would interview him portraying famous people in history, including Twain. Holbrook revised the concept into a one-man show in the 1950s, debuting it at the Lock Haven State Teachers College in Pennsylvania in 1954.

Holbrook refined the show in the 1950s in New York City. Holbrook and producer John Lotas were both young members of The Lambs Club in Manhattan; Holbrook performed the show in the club's 300-seat theater. Lotas presented the show at the 41st Street Theatre, where it ran for 174 performances as an off-Broadway engagement in 1959. Holbrook then toured the country with the show. In 2025, Richard Thomas would take on the role in a revival tour of the show.

== Broadway ==
Mark Twain Tonight! premiered on Broadway March 23, 1966, at the Longacre Theatre. It ran for 85 performances; Holbrook won a Tony Award for Best Performance by a Leading Actor in a Play for that appearance and an Emmy Award nomination for the 1967 television broadcast (which was produced by David Susskind) on CBS.

The show returned to the Imperial Theatre in March 1977 for 11 shows. The last performance on Broadway was in June 2005 for 15 performances at the Brooks Atkinson Theatre.

Holbrook released three Mark Twain Tonight! albums between 1959 and 1967.

== The Script ==
Holbrook was known to alternate the material that he performed. The original program from the 1959 Off-Broadway engagement included the note, "While Mr. Twain’s selections will come from the list below, we have been unable to pin him down as to which of them he will do. He claims this would cripple his inspiration. However, he has generously conceded to a printed program for those who are in distress and wish to fan themselves." This appeared on programs for the show until Holbrook abruptly announced his retirement from the show in September 2017.

== The performance ==
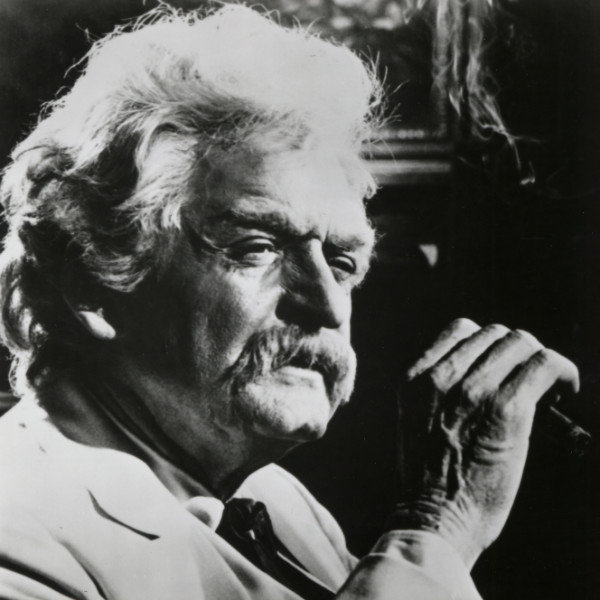
Holbrook performing as Twain at the University of Houston

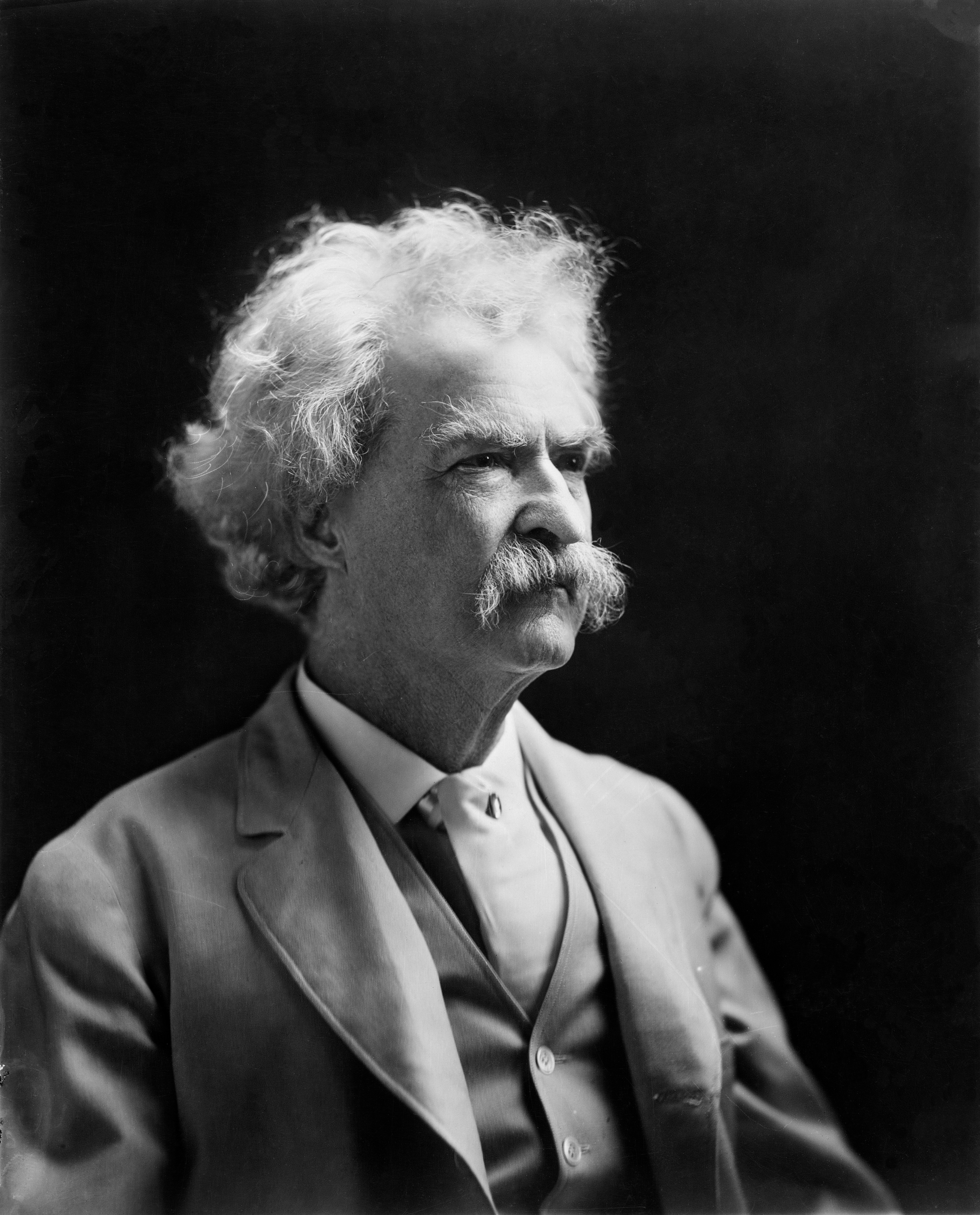
Mark Twain in 1907

In an interview with William Goldman, Holbrook explained how he structured the show. "Who wants to see an evening about a literary figure? I knew that in the first act I had to overcome that natural reluctance, so my biggest desire was to make them laugh their asses off at the start, so they'd go out at intermission and say, 'Hey, this guy's funny.' The second act became the social-comment act. I'd start with some funny material to get them again (but not too much of it, or they'd never stop laughing and take the show right away from you). In the last act I gave them the Twain they'd been expecting all along: warm, whimsical, memories of childhood."

Holbrook adapted to concerns that presenting Mark Twain as on an 1890s lecture circuit would use racial slurs acceptable in that era, but unacceptable to modern audiences. Challenging the critics, Holbrook often chose to read a passage from "Huckleberry Finn" where the orphaned, pipe-smoking, uneducated youngster, Huck, faces a poignant moral dilemma. Holbrook altered the narration to use the dialectally milder "Nigra" as the young boy wrestles with his conscience over following the law or his heart concerning "the widow's Nigra, Jim," a runaway slave. Audiences have embraced this presentation as the boy ultimately rejects the legal, societal and even religious ramifications in favor of helping the runaway on his quest for freedom. It is one of the more somber segments of a usually humorous presentation, which Holbrook has felt important to continue in the spirit of Twain's own message.

== Specials ==
On the occasion of Clemens' 175th birthday (November 30, 2010), Holbrook performed Mark Twain Tonight! in Elmira, New York, at the Clemens Center in front of a sell-out crowd. April 21, 2010 was the 100th anniversary of his death. The evening began with the singing of happy birthday to Clemens followed by Holbrook's appearance on stage. 2014 marked the 60th consecutive year that Holbrook had performed Mark Twain Tonight!

== See also ==
- Mark Twain in popular culture
- Mark Twain Live!, a similar long-running show by Mike Randall, whom Holbrook sued in the 1970s
