= International Day against Nuclear Tests =

Annual observance on August 29

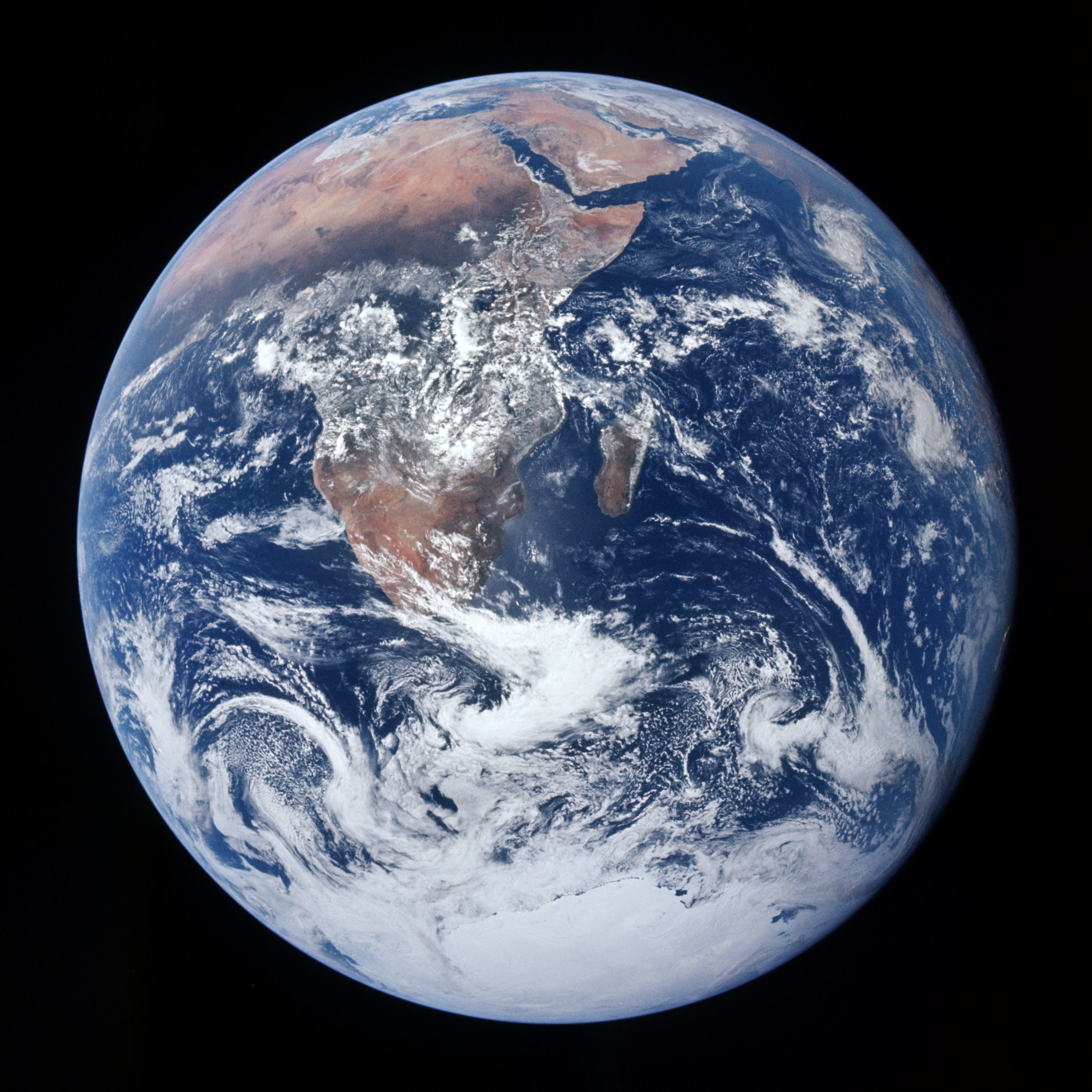
- Also called: IDANT
- Observed by: UN Members
- Celebrations: United Nations
- Date: 29 August
- Next time: 29 August 2027
- Frequency: annual

The International Day against Nuclear Tests is observed on August 29. It was established on December 2, 2009, at the 64th session of the United Nations General Assembly by the resolution 64/35, which was adopted unanimously.

The resolution in particular calls for increasing awareness "about the effects of nuclear weapon test explosions or any other nuclear explosions and the need for their cessation as one of the means of achieving the goal of a nuclear-weapon-free world". The resolution was initiated by Kazakhstan together with several sponsors and cosponsors to commemorate the closure of the Semipalatinsk Nuclear Test Site on August 29, 1991.

Following the establishment of the International Day against Nuclear Tests, in May 2010 all state parties to the Treaty on the Non-Proliferation of Nuclear Weapons committed themselves to "achieve the peace and security of a world without nuclear weapons".

== Conferences ==
On September 15, 2014, the Embassy of Kazakhstan in the United States, in co-sponsorship with the Arms Control Association, Green Cross International, the ATOM Project, and the Embassy of Canada, held a conference called "Nuclear Weapons Testing: History, Progress, Challenges", commemorating United Nations International Day Against Nuclear Tests. The conference took place at the U.S. Institute of Peace in Washington, D.C. This conference was focused on the issue of nuclear weapons testing, and the road forward for the Comprehensive Nuclear-Test-Ban Treaty.

The keynote presenters at the conference included the U.S. Secretary of Energy Ernest J. Moniz, the U.S. Under Secretary of State for Arms Control and International Security Rose E. Gottemoeller, the U.S. Under Secretary of Energy and NNSA Administrator Frank J. Klotz, and the Executive Secretary of the Comprehensive Nuclear-Test-Ban Treaty Organization, Lassina Zerbo. The participants of the conference underlined their commitment to nuclear weapons non-proliferation.

== In popular culture ==
- NationStates, a popular multiplayer government simulation browser game, celebrates the International Day against Nuclear Tests in a surprising way. On August 29 of every year, nations are granted the ability to use nuclear weapons against each other, leading to a violent multifaceted nuclear war. This tradition started after the mini-games initial appearance on the site for April Fools' Day 2017, and subsequent user requests to make this a regular event.
- In the 1991 film Terminator 2: Judgment Day, the titular Judgement Day occurs when the Skynet computer system gains self-awareness at 2:14 eastern time, August 29, 1997 and launches a global thermonuclear war to prevent its own deactivation by humans. 3 billion human lives are lost in the nuclear fire and the survivors face war against the Machines. Much of the action in the film revolves around Sarah Connor attempting to prevent Judgement Day from occurring, which was still several years into the future during the events of the film.

== See also ==
- Global Zero, an international non-partisan group of 300 world leaders dedicated to achieving the elimination of nuclear weapons.
- Greenpeace International, a non-governmental environmental organization with offices in over 41 countries and headquarters in Amsterdam, Netherlands.
- International Campaign to Abolish Nuclear Weapons
- International Day for the Total Elimination of Nuclear Weapons
- International Physicians for the Prevention of Nuclear War, which had affiliates in 41 nations in 1985, representing 135,000 physicians; IPPNW was awarded the UNESCO Peace Education Prize in 1984 and the Nobel Peace Prize in 1985.
- Pax Christi International, a Catholic group which took a "sharply anti-nuclear stand".
- Pugwash Conferences on Science and World Affairs
- Sōka Gakkai, a peace-orientated Buddhist organisation, which held anti-nuclear exhibitions in Japanese cities during the late 1970s, and gathered 10 million signatures on petitions calling for the abolition of nuclear weapons.
- United Nations Office for Disarmament Affairs
