= List of Buffalo Bills broadcasters =

The Buffalo Bills have been covered by numerous broadcasters, particularly through the Buffalo Bills Radio Network in radio.

== Radio ==
The Buffalo Bills Radio Network is flagshipped at WGRF (96.9 FM). Chris Brown (who previously called play-by-play for the Buffalo Bulls football and Buffalo Destroyers arena football teams before joining the Bills as a studio host) is the current play-by-play announcer. Eric Wood serves as the color analyst. The Bills radio network has twenty seven affiliates in upstate New York, three affiliates in northwestern Pennsylvania, WBRR 100.1 FM in Bradford, Pennsylvania, WQHZ 102.3 FM in Erie, Pennsylvania, one affiliate, CHUM 1050 AM (TSN Radio 1050) in Toronto, Ontario, Canada, and one affiliate, KGAB 650AM in Cheyenne, Wyoming.

=== Play-by-play ===
- Van Miller (1960–1971, 1978–2003)
- Al Meltzer and Rick Azar (1972–1977)
- John Murphy (2004–2022)
- Chris Brown (2023–present)

=== Color analysts ===
- Dick Rifenburg and Ralph Hubbell (1960–1972)
- Ed Rutkowski (1973–1977)
- Stan Barron (1978–1983)
- John Murphy (1984–1989, 1994–2003)
- Greg Brown (1990–1993)
- Alex Van Pelt (2004–2005)
- Mark Kelso (2006–2018)
- Eric Wood (2019, 2021-present)
- Steve Tasker (2020)

=== Sideline reporters ===
- Paul Peck (1998–2003, 2005–2008)
- Jeff Burris (2004–2005)
- Rich "Bull" Gaenzler (2009–2011)
- Joe Buscaglia (2012–2013)
- Sal Capaccio (2014–2025)
- Steve Tasker (2026–present)

=== Studio hosts ===
- Jim Brinson (2004)
- Rich "Bull" Gaenzler (2005–2006)
- Vic Carucci (2006–2008)
- Brent Axe (2009–2011)
- Mike Schopp and Chris "Bulldog" Parker (2012–present)

== Television ==
During preseason, most games are televised on MSG Western New York per a rights deal between MSG and the team owners Terry and Kim Pegula and simulcasted on Buffalo's CBS affiliate, WIVB-TV, channel 4, along with the stations of Nexstar Media Group elsewhere in upstate New York. Telecasts were previously handled by WKBW-TV, Buffalo's ABC affiliate, whose contract expired after the 2019 season, at which point WIVB, took over as the official broadcast home of the Bills. Since 2008, preseason games have been broadcast in high definition.

As an American Football Conference team, the majority of Buffalo Bills regular season games also air on CBS, which is carried in Buffalo on WIVB; Thursday night games, any home games in which the opponent is from the National Football Conference, and any games the league arbitrarily chooses to "cross-flex" air on Fox, whose local affiliate is WUTV. Sunday night games, should the Bills ever be selected for one, air on NBC, whose Buffalo affiliate is WGRZ. The rights to Monday night simulcasts from ESPN expired after 2017; as of August, it is unknown what station has purchased those rights.

As of 2021, the broadcast team consists of Andrew Catalon or Rob Stone on play-by-play, Steve Tasker as color commentator, and Cynthia Frelund as sideline reporter.

Year	Play-by-play	Analyst(s)	Field Reporter(s)
2000	Ray Bentley (home) or Jay Randolph (road)	Steve Tasker
2001	Dave Pasch	Steve Tasker
2002	Steve Tasker	Marv Levy
2003	Steve Tasker	Marv Levy
2004	Steve Tasker	Marv Levy
2005	Steve Tasker	Marv Levy
2006	Ray Bentley	Steve Tasker
2007	Ray Bentley	Steve Tasker
2008	Ray Bentley	Steve Tasker	Mike Catalana
2009	Ray Bentley	Steve Tasker	Mike Catalana
2010	Ray Bentley	Steve Tasker	Mike Catalana

== See also ==
- List of Bills Toronto Series broadcasters
