= WSFW =

CSN International radio station in Seneca Falls, New York

- Seneca Falls, New York; United States
- Frequency: 1110 kHz

Programming
- Format: Christian talk and teaching
- Affiliations: CSN Radio Network

Ownership
- Owner: CSN International

History
- First air date: October 1, 1968
- Call sign meaning: W Seneca Falls W

Technical information
- Licensing authority: FCC
- Facility ID: 5391
- Class: D
- Power: 1,000 watts day
- Transmitter coordinates: 42°54′55″N 76°46′28″W
- Translator: W296DI 107.1 MHz Seneca Falls

Links
- Public license information: Public file; LMS
- Webcast: Listen Live
- Website: www.csnradio.com

WSFW (1110 kHz) is an AM radio station broadcasting a Christian talk and teaching radio format. Licensed to Seneca Falls, New York, United States, the station is currently an owned-and-operated station of CSN International. Some of the national religious leaders heard on WSFW include Adrian Rogers, David Jeremiah and James Dobson.

Because AM 1110 is a clear channel frequency reserved for Class A stations WBT Charlotte and KFAB Omaha, WSFW is a daytimer and must go off the air at sunset to avoid interference. Programming is heard around the clock over a 200-watt FM translator, W296DI on 107.1 MHz.

== History ==
On October 1, 1968, WSFW signed on the air. It was owned by the Waterfalls Broadcasting Company. One month later, it added an FM counterpart, 99.3 WSFW-FM (now WFLK). The two stations simulcast a full service middle of the road format of popular music, news and sports.

In 2007, WSFW dropped its "Finger Lakes News-Talk Network" simulcast with WGVA Geneva, WCGR Canadaigua and WAUB Auburn, New York, then flipped to a travelers information format.

WSFW was sold to Calvary Chapel Twin Falls on November 12, 2009. The assignment of license was approved by the Federal Communications Commission (FCC) on January 12, 2010. At this point, WSFW adopted its current Christian talk and teaching format, supplied by CSN International.
