= 1380 AM =

AM radio frequency

The following radio stations broadcast on AM frequency 1380 kHz: 1380 AM is a Regional broadcast frequency, on which Class B and Class D stations broadcast.

== Argentina ==
- LRI231 in Necochea, Buenos Aires

== Canada ==
- CKPC in Brantford, Ontario - 25 kW, transmitter located at 43.055611°N 80.315°W

== Chile ==
- W radio 138 in Santiago

== Mexico ==
- XECO-AM in Mexico City

== United States ==
Call sign	City of license	Facility ID	Class	Daytime power (kW)	Nighttime power (kW)	Unlimited power (kW)	Transmitter coordinates
KBWD	Brownwood, Texas	7321	B	1	0.5		31.71°N 98.96°W
KCII	Washington, Iowa	71014	D	0.5	0.025		41.305°N 91.71°W
KCIM	Carroll, Iowa	9109	D	0.5	0.028		42.037778°N 94.884167°W
KCNW	Fairway, Kansas	10826	D	2.5	0.029		39.071944°N 94.682778°W
KHEY	El Paso, Texas	67771	B	5	0.5		31.757222°N 106.375833°W
KHWK	Winona, Minnesota	33276	D	2.2	0.028		44.033611°N 91.605°W
KKRX	Lawton, Oklahoma	50213	B	1	1		34.59°N 98.362222°W
KLIZ	Brainerd, Minnesota	28653	B	5	5		46.331944°N 94.173889°W
KMUS	Sperry, Oklahoma	25129	B	7	0.25		36.266389°N 95.970833°W
KOSS	Lancaster, California	19702	D	1	0.02		34.711944°N 118.176111°W (daytime); 34.711667°N 118.175833°W (nighttime)
KOTA	Rapid City, South Dakota	17678	B	5	5		44.033333°N 103.1875°W
KQKD	Redfield, South Dakota	70083	D	0.5	0.142		44.898056°N 98.506389°W
KRCM	Shenandoah, Texas	14228	D	22	0.05		30.127778°N 95.959722°W
KRKO	Everett, Washington	62056	B	50	50		47.875556°N 122.078333°W
KTKZ	Sacramento, California	59599	B	5	5		38.508056°N 121.579444°W (daytime); 38.5575°N 121.180833°W (nighttime)
KUVR	Holdrege, Nebraska	27178	D	0.32			40.515833°N 99.396389°W
KVSM	Santa Maria, California	161424	B	0.65	0.5		34.98°N 120.453333°W
KWMF	Pleasanton, Texas	55415	B	4	0.16		29°N 98.530556°W
KXFN	St. Louis, Missouri	74579	B	2	1		38.750278°N 90.162778°W (daytime); 38.524167°N 90.238056°W (nighttime)
KZTS	North Little Rock, Arkansas	665	B	5	2.5		34.880278°N 92.233361°W
WABH	Bath, New York	52119	B	10	0.45		42.314444°N 77.285833°W
WAOK	Atlanta, Georgia	63775	B	25	4.2		33.760833°N 84.478333°W (daytime); 33.76°N 84.479167°W (nighttime)
WBEL	South Beloit, Illinois	58732	B	5	5		42.459444°N 89.028611°W
WBTK	Richmond, Virginia	57831	B	5	5		37.621111°N 77.448889°W
WDLW	Lorain, Ohio	70108	D	0.5	0.057		41.43°N 82.151944°W
WELE	Ormond Beach, Florida	72937	B	5	2.5		29.269167°N 81.081667°W
WFNW	Naugatuck, Connecticut	8517	B	3.5	0.35		41.510556°N 73.055°W
WGLM	Greenville, Michigan	35423	B	1	0.5		43.158333°N 85.254444°W
WGYV	Greenville, Alabama	7902	D	1			31.833611°N 86.601944°W
WHEW	Franklin, Tennessee	681	D	2.8			35.906111°N 86.905833°W
WIKG	Waynesboro, Pennsylvania	27402	D	1	0.02		39.738889°N 77.602778°W
WKDM	New York, New York	71137	B	5	13		40.820278°N 74.067778°W
WKFO	Kittanning, Pennsylvania	69975	D	1	0.028		40.788611°N 79.534722°W
WKJG	Fort Wayne, Indiana	51724	B	5	5		41.004167°N 85.099167°W
WKJV	Asheville, North Carolina	2921	B	25	1		35.605278°N 82.591944°W
WLRM	Millington, Tennessee	15670	B	2.5	1		35.315556°N 89.923056°W
WLRV	Lebanon, Virginia	29514	D	1	0.063		36.921667°N 82.104444°W
WMJR	Nicholasville, Kentucky	72321	D	5	0.038		37.9075°N 84.478333°W
WMLP	Milton, Pennsylvania	73271	D	1	0.018		40.999722°N 76.87°W
WMTA	Central City, Kentucky	18947	D	0.5	0.023		37.275278°N 87.146389°W
WMTD	Hinton, West Virginia	6013	D	1	0.013		37.684167°N 80.915278°W
WNRI	Woonsocket, Rhode Island	1734	D	2.5	0.018		42.016111°N 71.491667°W
WNRR	North Augusta, South Carolina	72467	D	4	0.07		33.488056°N 81.946111°W
WOLA	Barranquitas, Puerto Rico	67343	B			1	18.183611°N 66.306667°W
WOTE	Clintonville, Wisconsin	58582	B	3.9	1.8		44.566944°N 88.7425°W
WPYR	Baton Rouge, Louisiana	47403	D	5	0.062		30.460833°N 91.223056°W
WRAB	Arab, Alabama	2552	D	1	0.049		34.335°N 86.468611°W
WSYB	Rutland, Vermont	25740	D	5	0.025		43.591667°N 72.990556°W
WTMC	Wilmington, Delaware	48381	D	0.25	0.01		39.7°N 75.608056°W
WVSA	Vernon, Alabama	36453	D	5	0.039		33.795833°N 88.1175°W
WWMI	St. Petersburg, Florida	11954	B	9.8	6.5		27.870833°N 82.6175°W
WWNT	Winston-Salem, North Carolina	59270	B	5	2.5		36.148056°N 80.319722°W
WWRF	Lake Worth, Florida	24461	D	1	0.103		26.622778°N 80.072222°W
WYSH	Clinton, Tennessee	12049	D	1	0.08		36.113333°N 84.141667°W
