= WFLK =

WFLK may refer to:

- WFLK (FM), a radio station (99.3 FM) licensed to Seneca Falls, New York, United States
- WLLW (FM), a radio station (101.7 FM) licensed to Geneva, New York, United States, which used the call sign WFLK from 1993 to 2016
- WTAX (AM), a radio station (1240 AM) licensed to Springfield, Illinois, United States, which used the call sign WFLK from February to August 1989
- WFNW, a radio station (1380 AM) licensed to Naugatuck, Connecticut, United States, which used the call sign WFLK in January 1989
