= WLLW =

WLLW may refer to:

- WLLW (FM), a radio station (101.7 FM) licensed to Geneva, New York, United States
- WFLK (FM), a radio station (99.3 FM) licensed to Seneca Falls, New York, United States, which used the call sign WLLW from 2000 to 2016
- WCIP (FM), a radio station (93.7 FM) licensed to Clyde, New York, United States, which used the call sign WLLW from 1995 to 2000
