= WQRW =

- Wellsville, New York; United States
- Broadcast area: Olean area
- Frequency: 93.5 MHz
- Branding: 93.5 The Genny

Programming
- Format: Classic rock

Ownership
- Owner: Bob Smith; (Bulldog Sounds)
- Sister stations: WXMT

History
- First air date: 2007
- Call sign meaning: "Q Rock Wellsville"

Technical information
- Licensing authority: FCC
- Facility ID: 165995
- Class: A
- ERP: 1,100 watts
- HAAT: 234 meters
- Transmitter coordinates: 42°11′25″N 77°49′17″W

Links
- Public license information: Public file; LMS
- Webcast: Listen Live
- Website: q935wqrw.com

WQRW (93.5 FM) is a radio station broadcasting a classic rock format. Licensed to Wellsville, New York, United States, the station serves Allegany County. The station is owned by Bulldog Sounds.

== Origins ==
The 93.5 frequency in Wellsville was previously used by WJQZ, now at 103.5 MHz.

WQRW was intended to be a repeater for WQRS, a classic rock station known on air as "Q Rock", when its construction permit was filed in fall 2006. However, WQRS's lone local jock, Scott Douglas, left the station and went to WESB/WBRR instead, and WQRS itself became little more than a satellite station. Instead, the ownership decided to give WQRW its own identity and thus was branded instead as "Q 93.5".

Pfunter (also spelled Pfuntner) was forced to sell off most of his other radio holdings (most of them to Sound Communications, who later sold to Seven Mountains Media in 2021) due to a bankruptcy in 2012 tied to an unrelated issue related to his ownership of the Keuka Maid boat. He retained ownership of WQRW until his death. Pfunter died in August 2025, with his estate selling the station to Bulldog Sounds (owner of WXMT) in February 2026. The sale closed later that year, with the station adopting the brand "The Genny" with a classic rock format by June.
