= Steve Tasker =

American sports reporter

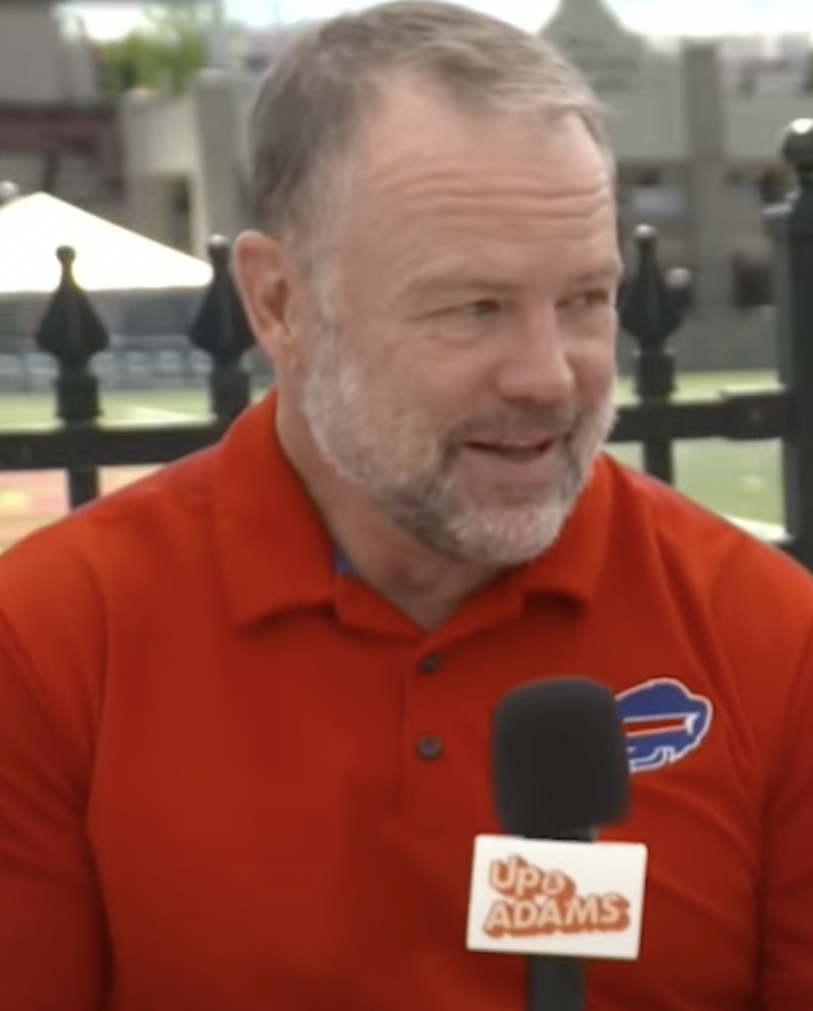
- Tasker in 2023

No. 80, 89
- Position: Wide receiver

Personal information
- Born: April 10, 1962 (age 64); Smith Center, Kansas, U.S.
- Listed height: 5 ft 9 in (1.75 m)
- Listed weight: 185 lb (84 kg)

Career information
- High school: Wichita County (Leoti, Kansas)
- College: Northwestern
- NFL draft: 1985: 9th round, 226th overall pick

Career history
- Houston Oilers (1985–1986); Buffalo Bills (1986–1997)

Awards and highlights
- 5× First-team All-Pro (1991–1995); 7× Pro Bowl (1987, 1990–1995); Buffalo Bills Wall of Fame; Buffalo Bills 50th Anniversary Team

Career NFL statistics
- Receptions: 51
- Receiving yards: 779
- Receiving touchdowns: 9
- Blocked punts: 7
- Fumble recoveries: 6
- Safeties: 1
- Total return yards: 1,245
- Stats at Pro Football Reference

Steven Jay Tasker (born April 10, 1962) is an American sports reporter and former professional football wide receiver in the National Football League (NFL). He spent the majority of his career with the Buffalo Bills but began his career with the Houston Oilers. He was a five-time first-team All-Pro and a seven-time Pro Bowl selection, primarily as a special teams player.

Tasker played college football at Dodge City Community College in Kansas before playing for the Northwestern Wildcats. He was selected in the ninth round of the 1985 NFL draft by the Oilers. Tasker played most of his pro career with Buffalo, and was voted by Bills fans to the team's 50th season All-time Team. After retiring from playing, he worked as a reporter, serving locally in Western New York on the MSG Western New York cable TV station, and on WGR Radio and formerly for CBS Sports.

In 2008, the NFL Network show NFL Top 10 ranked Tasker the ninth-best former player not enshrined in the Pro Football Hall of Fame. He has several times been a nominee for the Hall, making the semi-finalist list eight times, but has not been selected as a member as of 2026.

== College career ==
Tasker first attended Dodge City Community College. After two years, he transferred to Northwestern University where he played the final two years of his college career before joining the National Football League. Tasker finished his college career with 1,055 combined return yards from punts and kickoffs, averaging 10.8 yards per punt return. After finishing his college football career, and before being drafted into the NFL, he joined the school's rugby team. Although he had never played rugby before, he was named most valuable player at the Big Ten Conference Tournament. Tasker continues to hold the Northwestern Wildcats football career record for kickoff return average (24.3).

== Professional football career ==
Tasker was selected in the ninth round (226th overall) of the 1985 NFL draft by the Houston Oilers, where he played for two seasons. He was claimed off waivers by the Buffalo Bills on November 8, 1986. Tasker was listed as a wide receiver; however, most of his playing time came as a gunner, on punts and kickoffs. After he joined the Buffalo Bills, he began to play at wide receiver more than with the Oilers. In a 1994 playoff game against the Los Angeles Raiders, he set up the Bills first touchdown with a 67-yard kickoff return. He also caught 5 passes for 108 yards and a touchdown in Buffalo's 1995 playoff win against the Miami Dolphins.

=== Play on special teams ===
Tasker stood 5 feet 9 inches (1.75 m) tall and weighed 180 pounds (82 kg); when he joined the Bills, Jim Haslett did not think that he was a player. Tasker recalled, "I told him not to worry because I was mistaken for a ball boy all the time". Tasker played in seven Pro Bowls (1987 and 1990–1995) and became the only special teamer ever to be named the game's MVP in 1993.

- 204 special teams tackles
- 7 blocked punts
- 7-time Pro Bowl selection
- Only special teams player ever elected Pro Bowl MVP
- Was voted one of 26 players by the Pro Football Hall of Fame in the year 2000 as "The Best of the Best ALL TIME Players in the History of the Game"

He was ranked No. 9 on the NFL Network's NFL Top 10 Players Not in the Hall of Fame. Many, including former teammate and Hall of Fame quarterback Jim Kelly, consider him to be the greatest special teams player of all-time and believe that he should be in the Hall of Fame.

== Sportscasting career ==
Tasker was a color commentator and sideline reporter for CBS football telecasts from 1998 until 2018. He also does color commentary for the local broadcasts of Bills pre-season games, teaming with his former NFL on CBS broadcast partner Andrew Catalon. He is also the spokesperson for the West Herr Auto Group. Tasker was on the sidelines with Jim Nantz and Phil Simms during the playoffs until 2013. He also worked with Don Criqui and was best known working with Gus Johnson in 1998, week 13 in 1999, week 5 in 2004, and from 2005 to 2010. Johnson left for FOX Sports the following year. He and Johnson called the David Garrard game winning Hail Mary touchdown pass for the Jacksonville Jaguars' win over the Houston Texans in 2010. CBS dismissed Tasker prior to the 2019 season as they chose not to renew his contract.

On September 9, 2007, Tasker became the 24th person inducted to the Bills' Wall of Fame. On November 22, 2011, Tasker was named one of the semifinalists in balloting for the Pro Football Hall of Fame in Canton, Ohio.

On September 28, 2013, his son, Luke Tasker, made his Canadian Football League debut with the Hamilton Tiger-Cats, in a home game against the Calgary Stampeders. Luke Tasker also became a broadcaster during and after his playing career, becoming the Tiger-Cats' color commentator.

In April 2018, Tasker became co-host of One Bills Live, a daily weekday radio show focusing on the Buffalo Bills alongside Chris Brown on WGR and MSG Western New York. He served as the color commentator and analyst for the Buffalo Bills Radio Network in 2020 alongside John Murphy after Eric Wood opted out of the season due to traveling difficulties associated with the coronavirus pandemic. In 2026, Tasker was named as the new sideline reporter for Bills radio broadcasts.

== Personal life ==
Tasker's son Luke, played wide receiver for the Hamilton Tiger-Cats in the Canadian Football League. He resides in East Aurora, New York as of 2002.
