= WLVL =

Radio station in Lockport, New York

- Lockport, New York; United States
- Broadcast area: Buffalo-Niagara Falls
- Frequency: 1340 kHz
- Branding: Hometown 1340 AM

Programming
- Format: Talk radio
- Affiliations: Fox News Radio

Ownership
- Owner: Bill Yuhnke; (Kenmore Broadcasting Communications, Inc.)
- Sister stations: WEBR

History
- First air date: May 20, 1949
- Former call signs: WUSJ (1949–1975)
- Call sign meaning: Love Lockport

Technical information
- Licensing authority: FCC
- Facility ID: 14714
- Class: C
- Power: 1,000 watts
- Transmitter coordinates: 43°10′30″N 78°42′39″W

Links
- Public license information: Public file; LMS
- Webcast: Listen live
- Website: wlvl.com

WLVL (1340 AM) is a radio station broadcasting a talk format. Licensed to Lockport, New York, United States, the station serves the Buffalo-Niagara Falls area. The station is owned by Bill Yuhnke, who also owns WEBR in Niagara Falls.

== History ==
From at least 1936 until 1948, the 1340 frequency on the Niagara Frontier was occupied by the original WEBR, which moved down the dial to 970 (now WDCZ) in 1948. WLVL went on the air in 1949 as WUSJ, owned by the Lockport Union-Sun and Journal, Inc., the local newspaper that owned it until 1970. The station was sold to Hall Communications in 1970 and became WLVL in 1975.

Logo while using the 105.3 translator

For most of the 21st century, WLVL was owned by Dick Greene, through his holding company Culver Communications. In September 2022, WLVL owner Dick Greene announced his retirement and the sale of the station to Bill Yuhnke, who owns WEBR and Liberty Yellow Cab, a taxicab service in the Buffalo region. Yuhnke plans no changes to the station's format or staff. Yuhnke's purchase of WLVL closed on January 20, 2023, at a price of $375,000.

== Programming ==
WLVL offers a morning drive time talk show hosted by John Maser with Hank Nevins (a frequent on-again off-again contributor to WLVL over the decades) as newsman, a tradio program, a "Dial-a-Deal" program in which listeners can buy gift certificates at discount prices, and a weekly sports talk program devoted to Niagara County sports teams. The station carries affiliations with Fox News Radio, Dana Loesch, The Ramsey Show, Bill O'Reilly, Stephanie Miller (a progressive talk host included on the lineup mainly because of her local ties to Lockport) and Lionel.

Sports on WLVL include the Niagara Power collegiate summer baseball squad and local high school sports. It is an affiliate of the New York Yankees Radio Network. Select weekend programming, including Cousin Brucie and Joe Piscopo, is simulcast with WEBR.

Until May 2025, WLVL was affiliated with Premiere Networks, carrying its conservative talk slate of the Glenn Beck Radio Program, The Sean Hannity Show, and The Clay Travis & Buck Sexton Show (the last of which joined in 2021 after WBEN turned it down following the death of Rush Limbaugh). Premiere issued a 90-day cancellation notice to WLVL in May 2025, and rather than wait until the cancellation became official, Yuhnke quickly assembled a new lineup that June. In September, the station affiliated with Compass Media Networks for its Sunday afternoon National Football League broadcasts.

== Alumni ==
- Dick Corey was one of WUSJ's earliest news anchors. Desiring a stage name more reflective of his Spaniard heritage, he changed it to Rick Azar when he moved to WKBW-TV.
- Frank Arlington (a.k.a. Frank Williams), who spent over 30 years as a sportscaster for WESB, was a member of WLVL's staff in the early 1980s.
- Brian Kahle, former AM Buffalo host, hosted a talk show on WLVL from 2007 until his death in 2013.
- Tom Jolls, longtime Buffalo television personality, began his career at what was then WUSJ and had an 11-year run at the station, 1951–62.
- National talk show host Stephanie Miller started at WLVL before leaving for Rochester's WCMF. As of 2025, WLVL carries her syndicated program.
- John Murphy, the Voice of the Buffalo Bills and a Lockport native, started at WLVL, handling play-by-play of Niagara-Orleans League games.
- Doug Young, a radio veteran of WGR and the now-defunct WNSA, hosted an interview program on WLVL, but was fired in September 2008.
- Tim Schmitt, former executive sports editor of the Niagara Gazette, Lockport Union Sun & Journal and Tonawanda News, and now the editor of Golfweek magazine as well as the golf coordinator for USA Today, was the news director for three years and hosted a mid-day talk show called "Stuck in the Middle with Tim Schmitt."
- Brad Riter hosted a program from 10:00 to noon for a few weeks in 2025, between dropping Glenn Beck and engaging Brian Kilmeade
