= Buffalo Bills Radio Network =

Official radio network of the NFL's Buffalo Bills

- Type: Radio network
- Country: United States; Canada
- Headquarters: Orchard Park, New York
- Broadcast area: New York; Pennsylvania (limited); Florida (limited); Wyoming (limited); Ontario (limited); Quebec (limited)
- Owner: Buffalo Bills; Good Karma Sports
- Established: 1960
- Affiliations: NFL iHeartRadio Canada; TSN
- Affiliates: 28 (including 2 flagships)
- Webcast: Listen live (via TuneIn)
- Official website: Buffalo Bills Radio Network

The Buffalo Bills Radio Network is an international broadcast radio network based in Orchard Park, New York. Its primary programming is broadcasts of Buffalo Bills home and away games to a network of 28 stations across the state of New York, the province of Ontario, and the Northwestern and Northern Tiers of Pennsylvania and one station in each of Florida, Quebec and the state of Wyoming.

Previously, the broadcasts originated from WBEN through much of the team's history except for a period from 1971 to 1977 when WKBW was team flagship. WGR briefly carried games in the early 1990s. From 1998 through 2011, the Bills were flagshipped at WGRF, as well as other stations owned by Citadel Broadcasting. When Cumulus Media purchased Citadel in late 2011, it dropped Bills games from all of its stations at the end of the season. Cumulus never fully paid off the money Citadel owed for Bills games, instead eventually seeking to nullify the debt in January 2018 when the company went into bankruptcy. Entercom Communications and Galaxy Communications picked up the rights, restoring broadcasts to WGR for the 2012 season.

During the time of the Bills Toronto Series, the station was carried on CJCL in Toronto, Ontario, Canada. CHML in Hamilton also briefly carried games in the late 2010s but dropped them after re-securing the rights to the team it had carried for much of its history, the Hamilton Tiger-Cats. (CHML ceased operations in 2024.)

The station added an affiliate in Wyoming in 2021, KGAB in Laramie County, Wyoming, mainly to allow Wyoming Cowboys football fans to follow Bills starting quarterback and Wyoming alumnus Josh Allen. KGAB dropped Bills games for the 2023 season but was quietly restored to the network in 2026. KGAB's signal also covers the Denver metropolitan area in Colorado and the western panhandle of Nebraska.

Chris Brown, formerly a Buffalo Destroyers play-by-play announcer who had most recently been studio host for the Bills' shows on MSG Western New York, serves as play-by-play announcer, with former Bills offensive lineman Eric Wood as color commentator and former Bills special teams ace Steve Tasker as sideline reporter.

Van Miller was the voice of the Buffalo Bills from the team's inception until 2003, with the exception of 1972 to 1978, when WKBW controlled radio rights and Miller's TV employer, WBEN-TV (now WIVB), would not permit him to appear on WKBW broadcasts. Miller was succeeded by John Murphy, his longtime color commentator, when he retired from the booth after the 2003 season. Murphy suffered a stroke in January 2023 and formally relinquished play-by-play duties in May 2024. Brown became the permanent play-by-play announcer in 2024.

In 2026, the Bills ended their affiliation with Audacy and WGR and affiliated with Good Karma Brands (now Good Karma Sports as of August 2026) as its broadcast partner. WGRF returned as their flagship station starting with the 2026 season, with multiple new affiliates, including Good Karma-owned stations in New York City and South Florida, home markets to two Bills division rivals. Shortly before the start of the Bills preseason, the team secured carriage of the Bills radio network in Canada, via the three remaining affiliates of TSN Radio and the TSN national stream on iHeartRadio Canada. As WGRF (97 Rock) is primarily a music station, Good Karma took over operations of Cumulus's lone remaining Buffalo AM station WBBF in September 2026 to provide an on-air home for the Bills' daily call-in talk show One Bills Live.

== Stations ==
City	State Province	Call sign	Frequency	Notes
Buffalo	New York	WGRF	96.9 FM	FM flagship station
Buffalo	New York	WBBF	1120 AM	AM flagship station. Translator on 98.9 FM
Albany	New York	W240EC	95.9 FM	Simulcast of WOFX Troy
Alfred	New York	W284BX	104.7 FM	Simulcast of WMTT-FM Tioga, PA
Auburn	New York	WAUB	1590 AM	
Bath	New York	W239BK	95.7 FM	Simulcast of WMTT-FM Tioga, PA
Binghamton	New York	WENE	1430 AM	
Cobleskill	New York	WSDE	1190 AM	Translator on 94.3 FM
Cortland	New York	WIII	99.9 FM	
Duanesburg	New York	W261DP	100.1 FM	Simulcast of WSDE Cobleskill
Dunkirk	New York	WDOE	1410 AM	Translators on 101.5 and 105.5 FM. Includes One Bills Live on tape delay
Geneva	New York	WGVA	1240 AM	Translator on 106.3 FM
Hornell	New York	WKPQ	105.3 FM	
Ithaca	New York	W262AD	100.3 FM	Simulcast of WIII Cortland
Jamestown	New York	WWSE	93.3 FM	
New York City	New York	WEPN	1050 AM	
Newark	New York	WACK	1420 AM	Translator on 96.9 FM in Sodus
Ogdensburg	New York	WQTK	92.7 FM	
Olean	New York	WPIG	95.7 FM	
Rochester	New York	WAIO	95.1 FM	
Rochester	New York	WHTK	1280 AM	One Bills Live only
Syracuse	New York	WSKO	1260 AM	Includes One Bills Live
Troy	New York	WOFX	980 AM	
Utica	New York	WKLL	94.9 FM	
Watertown	New York	WOTT	94.1 FM	
Wellsville	New York	W267DF	101.3 FM	Simulcast of WPIG Olean
West Palm Beach	Florida	WESP	106.3 FM	
Toronto	Ontario	CHUM	1050 AM	Includes select tape-delayed broadcasts of One Bills Live
Ottawa	Ontario	CFGO	1200 AM	
Bradford	Pennsylvania	WBRR	100.1 FM	
Erie	Pennsylvania	WRKT	104.9 FM	
Mansfield	Pennsylvania	W250BI	97.9 FM	Simulcast of WMTT-FM Tioga
Tioga	Pennsylvania	WMTT-FM	94.7 FM	Serving the Elmira-Corning, NY market.
Williamsport	Pennsylvania	WRAK	1400 AM	
Montreal	Quebec	CKGM	690 AM	
Orchard Valley	Wyoming	KGAB	650 AM	Serving Laramie and Cheyenne, WY and Denver, CO. Translator on 99.5 FM.

=== Former affiliates ===
- WGNA 1460: Albany (1988–1989 seasons)
- WBEN 930: Buffalo (1960–1971 seasons), (1979–1989 seasons), (1994–1997 seasons)
- WKBW 1520: Buffalo (1972–1978 seasons)
- WGR 550: Buffalo (1990–93 seasons), (2012–2025 seasons)
- WDNY-FM 93.9: Dansville
- WCMF 96.5: Rochester (2012–2025 seasons)
- WROC 950: Rochester (2012–2025 seasons)
- WGY 810: Schenectady (1991–1995 seasons)
- CJCL 590: Toronto
- CHML 900: Hamilton
- WRIE 1260: Erie
- WXTA 97.9: Erie
- WSPQ 1300: Springville
- WWCB 1370: Corry

== Announcers ==
=== Play-by-play ===
- Van Miller (1960–1971, 1978–2003)
- Al Meltzer and Rick Azar (1972–1977)
- John Murphy (2004–2022)
- Chris Brown (2023–present)

=== Color analysts ===
- Ralph Hubbell and Dick Rifenburg (1960–?)
- Ed Rutkowski (1973–1977, 1990)
- Don Gilbert (1978–79)
- Stan Barron and Jefferson Kaye (1978–1983)
- John Murphy (1984–1989, 1994–2003)
- Greg Brown and Marc Stout (1991–1993)
- Alex Van Pelt (2004)
- Mark Kelso (2006–2018)
- Steve Tasker (2020)
- Eric Wood (2019, 2021–present)

=== Sideline reporters ===
- Jeff Burris (2006)
- Paul Peck (2005, 2007–2008)
- Rich Gaenzler (2009–11)
- Joe Buscaglia (2012–2014)
- Sal Capaccio (2014–2025)
- Steve Tasker (2026–present)

=== Studio hosts ===
- Rich Gaenzler (2004–2008)
- Brent Axe (2009–2011)
- Howard Simon (2004, 2012–2019)
- Sal Capaccio (2012–2013)
- Jeremy White (2012–2026)
- Nate Geary (2020–2026)
- Joe DiBiase (2020–2026)
- Chris Trapasso (2026-present)
- Mitch Morse (2026-present)

=== Engineers ===
- Greg Harvey (____– present)
- Todd Broady (____– present)
- Todd Large (_____– present)
