= Wote =

Wote may refer to:

- WOTE, an American radio station
- Wote, Kenya
- Aman Wote (born 1984), Ethiopian runner
- Walk off the Earth, a canadian indie pop band
