= Mary Travers (disambiguation) =

Mary Travers (1936–2009) was an American singer-songwriter and member of the folk-pop group, Peter, Paul and Mary.

Mary Travers may also refer to:

- Mary Rose-Anna Travers (1894–1941), Québécoise singer known as Madame Bolduc or La Bolduc
- Mary Travers (murder victim) (died 1984), victim of The Troubles murdered by IRA militant Mary McArdle
- Mary Travers Murphy (born 1958), former television journalist and politician
- Mary Widdicombe Travers (c. 1783–1854), Newfoundland entrepreneur and philanthropist
