= WJJL =

WJJL may refer to:

- WJJL (FM), a radio station (90.7 FM) licensed to serve Carbon Hill, Alabama, United States; see List of radio stations in Alabama
- WEBR, a radio station (1440 AM) licensed to serve Niagara Falls, New York, United States, which held the call sign WJJL from 1947 to 2020
