= WJMQ =

- Clintonville, Wisconsin; United States
- Frequency: 92.3 MHz
- Branding: Frog 92.3

Programming
- Format: Country music
- Affiliations: ABC Radio, Jones Radio Network

Ownership
- Owner: Results Broadcasting, Inc.
- Sister stations: WOTE WATK WACD

History
- Former call signs: WFCL-FM (1983–1986)

Technical information
- Licensing authority: FCC
- Facility ID: 58581
- Class: A
- ERP: 6,000 watts
- HAAT: 91.0 meters
- Transmitter coordinates: 44°34′1.00″N 88°44′33.00″W

Links
- Public license information: Public file; LMS
- Webcast: Listen Live
- Website: Official Website

WJMQ (92.3 FM) is a radio station broadcasting a country music format. Licensed to Clintonville, Wisconsin, United States. The station is currently owned by Results Broadcasting, Inc. and features programming from ABC Radio.

== History ==
The station went on the air as WFCL-FM on September 9, 1983. On January 1, 1986, the station changed its call sign to the current WJMQ.

Previous logo
