= WFLR =

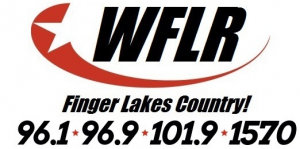
- Dundee, New York; United States
- Broadcast area: Penn Yan, New York
- Frequency: 1570 kHz
- Branding: 96.1–96.9–101.9–1570 WFLR

Programming
- Format: Country
- Affiliations: Motor Racing Network; Performance Racing Network

Ownership
- Owner: The Fingerlakes Radio Group, Inc.
- Sister stations: WAUB, WCGR, WFLK, WGVA, WNYR-FM

History
- Call sign meaning: Finger Lakes Radio

Technical information
- Licensing authority: FCC
- Facility ID: 36407
- Class: B
- Power: 1,000 watts day; 440 watts night
- Transmitter coordinates: 42°32′40″N 76°59′35″W
- Translators: 95.9 W240DO (Geneva); 96.1 W241CN (Penn Yan); 96.9 W245BL (Dundee); 101.9 W270BY (Watkins Glen)

Links
- Public license information: Public file; LMS
- Webcast: Listen Live
- Website: www.fingerlakesdailynews.com

WFLR (1570 AM) is a radio station broadcasting a local news and country music format from studios in Penn Yan, New York. Licensed to Dundee, New York, United States, the station is owned by The Fingerlakes Radio Group, Inc.
