= WEBR =

Radio station in Niagara Falls, New York

- Niagara Falls, New York; United States
- Broadcast area: Buffalo-Niagara Falls metropolitan area
- Frequency: 1440 kHz
- Branding: The Breeze

Programming
- Format: Soft adult contemporary
- Affiliations: NBC News Radio

Ownership
- Owner: William Yuhnke; (Kenmore Broadcasting Communications, Inc.)
- Sister stations: WLVL

History
- First air date: December 21, 1947
- Former call signs: WJJL (1947–2020)
- Call sign meaning: thE BReeze (brand retrofitted to existing call sign previously used on WDCZ from 1924 to 1975)

Technical information
- Licensing authority: FCC
- Facility ID: 39517
- Class: D
- Power: 1,000 watts (day); 55 watts (night)
- Transmitter coordinates: 43°4′43.00″N 79°0′40.00″W
- Translators: 105.3 W287CV (Lockport); 106.9 W295BW (Grand Island)

Links
- Public license information: Public file; LMS
- Webcast: Listen live
- Website: webrradio.com

WEBR (1440 AM) is an commercial radio station licensed to Niagara Falls, New York, United States, serving the Buffalo–Niagara Falls metropolitan area. Owned by William Yuhnke through licensee Kenmore Broadcasting Communications, Inc., the station features a soft adult contemporary format from studios on Kenmore Avenue in Buffalo.

The transmitter is located on Buffalo Avenue (NY State Route 384) in Niagara Falls, near South Hyde Park Boulevard.

== History ==
=== As WJJL ===
WJJL's logo during the ownership of M.J. Phillips (1990s to 2019).

On December 21, 1947, the station signed on as WJJL. The call sign represented the initials of its founding owner, John J. Laux. The station was originally a daytimer, required to go off the air at sunset.

In the late 1940s and early 1950s, Canadian native Thomas Talbot worked for Laux as a salesperson at the station. Eventually, Talbot became sales manager and then owner of WJJL, which was incorporated as the Niagara Frontier Broadcasting Corp. He also owned FM radio station 96.1 WBNY (now WTSS) in Buffalo.

Talbot began one of the first radio "two-way" telephone talk shows in the United States in the early 1950s, which was called Party Line. There was an eight-second delay to avoid potential problem calls.

The mid-morning show was named Viewpoint in the 1960s and continues to be hosted by longtime Niagara Falls fixture and former news director Tom Darro.

Talbot died in 1976, and the station was taken over by his widow, Norma Talbot.

An 18-year-old aspiring country musician named Ramblin' Lou Schriver was one of the station's early on-air personalities. In 1970, he bought his own station, WXRL 1300 AM, in Lancaster, New York.

In WJJL's heyday, the station was locally programmed for Niagara Falls with a full line-up of live, local personalities. An active news department covered Niagara Falls and the surrounding Niagara County.

The station aired a number of live ethnic and specialty programs on weekends. They included the Spanish language Ecos Borincanos program aimed at the Puerto Rican community, which enjoyed a 40-year run, along with the Italian Mattinata D'Oro and Pit Stop for auto-racing fans. Later, Casa Rico, the nation's longest running Italian language program, moved to WJJL, and it continues today on WEBR, renamed "Italian Gold" with Tony Occhiuto as host.

=== Former personalities ===
WJJL was a launching pad for many future top talents. These include former News Director and Viewpoint host Dave McKinley, later an Emmy Award-winning reporter for WGRZ-TV 2 in Buffalo. John Murphy, the radio voice of Buffalo Bills football, worked there early in his career, as did long-time WJYE/WMSX Morning Host Joe Chille, and national voice-over artist (and WRMI Legends shortwave personality) Jeff Laurence. Former WGN Radio-Chicago VP/general manager Tom Langmyer worked there as a summer fill-in personality, news reporter and anchor while in college.

Other noted WJJL alumni include George "Hound Dog" Lorenz, Barry Lillis, Dorothy Shank, WBEN Buffalo talk show host Tom Bauerle, WBFO Buffalo Reporter Dave Debo, Tony Magoo, John Jarrett, Jon Park, David J. Miller, Bob O'Neil, WKBW-TV Buffalo Anchor Melanie Pritchard, WGR Buffalo's Howard Simon, former WIVB-TV Buffalo personality Craig Nigrelli and Cumulus Media Networks, Red Eye Radio, Nationally Syndicated Talk Host and former WBEN Talk Host Gary McNamara. Local, national and satellite radio star Zig Fracassi interned there.

=== Changing ownership ===
The Talbot family sold WJJL to M.J. Phillips, who owned the station from the 1990s until 2020 and operated it as an oldies music station. Unlike other oldies stations, WJJL maintained its focus on 1950s and early 1960s music throughout Phillips's ownership, resisting the format drift to classic hits most other oldies stations experienced. In the 21st century, Phillips encountered financial problems (for a time he was listed as a debtor in possession of the WJJL license) and frequently tangled with a vexatious litigant named Joann who made repeated false filings with the FCC in a failed attempt to wrest control of the station from Phillips.

After WJJL's Niagara Falls offices and studios were destroyed in a fire in 1999, Phillips moved the station to West Seneca, a Buffalo suburb, which is 30 miles from Niagara Falls.

In 2009, WJJL's morning show began broadcasting from a satellite studio in the Niagara Arts and Cultural Center in Niagara Falls. WJJL also carried a daily talk show by former mayor Vince Anello, following Anello's 2011 release from prison for corruption, which continued after the format flip to WEBR until Anello's 2021 death.

From 2000 to 2009, WJJL broadcast weekly games of the City of Buffalo Public School's Harvard Cup football league. The Harvard Cup championship was traditionally played on Thanksgiving. WJJL continued its weekly coverage of Western New York High School Football with a "Game of the Week," focusing on the teams of the former Harvard Cup League. The games featured Rich Kozak as play by play man with Hall of Fame Coach Art Serotte as color analyst. Roger Weiss served as guest analyst and half-time host and "Dr." John Pluta was the sideline reporter. The broadcasts also featured Sean Bruso and Chuck Dockery. The broadcasts helped to foster the Harvard Cup Hall of Fame and HarvardCup.com as the first dedicated website devoted exclusively to high school coverage on the Western New York area.

=== As WEBR ===
==== Adult standards and MOR period ====
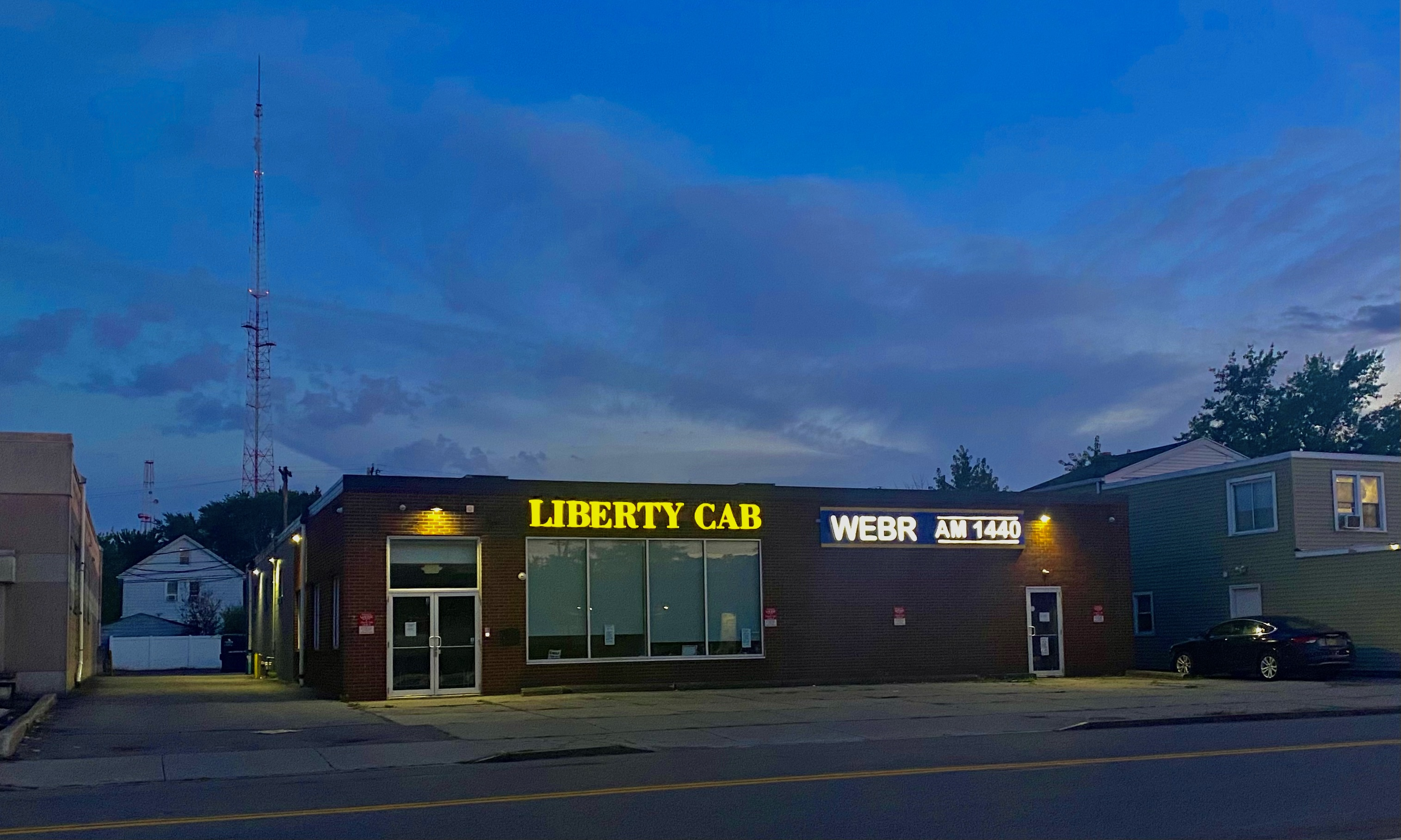
WEBR's studio building on Kenmore Avenue in Buffalo, which it has occupied since 2020.

In 2020, Phillips sold the station to William Yuhnke, who re-launched the station's online presence and began streaming the station on the Internet. Yuhnke owns Liberty Yellow Cab, a taxicab service in the Buffalo area. One of Phillips's minority partners, Jeffrey Lazroe, sued the station shortly after the sale. The station also faces issues with its transmitter, which sits on the property of Superior Lubricants in Niagara Falls, a property that is set to be repurposed; Yuhnke is hoping to find a new site in Niagara Falls but is also talking with interests in North Tonawanda.

On July 3, 2020, WJJL changed its format to adult standards ending the station's decades-long oldies format. It changed its call sign on July 4, 2020, to WEBR, the former call-letters at AM 1340, AM 970 and FM 94.5 in Buffalo. The WEBR call letters were previously used in Buffalo from 1924 until 1993. Don Angelo, a longtime radio programmer and former part-owner of WBBZ-TV, began as general manager. The format change marked the return of adult standards to the Niagara Frontier for the first time since WECK dropped the format in 2017. John Farley, a carryover from WJJL, continues to host a Sunday afternoon oldies block.

The station added a morning show hosted by Gail Ann Huber (a Buffalo radio veteran with experience at WECK, WHTT, and WYRK) and Bob Stilson (formerly at WBEN and WKBW-TV). Other WEBR hosts at the time of launch included Tom Darro (carrying over his talk show from WJJL), original 1970s-era WEBR jockey Jack Horohoe with the "Midday Coffee," and Barry Lillis with the "Make Believe Dance Floor." (Lillis, a WJJL alumnus most famous for his work as WGRZ's weather anchor, returned to broadcasting after over 20 years out of the field). Horohoe unexpectedly died a few months into his second tenure on the station, while Lillis left the station after one year. (He stated that the format tweak that year, while he was "OK" with the music change, had also led to him losing creative control over his show; he was unwilling to voice-track a show in which he had incorporated audience interaction and theater of the mind.) Lillis would return in a weekend position in late 2022, staying there until his retirement in March 2025. WHTT jock Tony Venturoli joined the station in 2021, hosting a classic hits themed block. Al Wallack, who hosted Jazz in the Nighttime on the original WEBR, reprised the show on Sunday afternoons on the current incarnation during its first few months of operation. Wallack died in 2024. Huber left the station near the end of 2022, with Kelly Wahl taking over afternoon drive. Dave Gillen, whose credits include time at 102.5 (the frequency now occupied by WBKV, the format now on WLKK-HD2) and co-founding the World's Largest Disco, served as program director and fill-in host. Gillen departed the station amid controversy and a lawsuit by former operations manager Nancy Freeman, who accused Gillen of sexual harassment and WEBR of retaliating against her. Additional programming included a weekly 80s music show hosted by former 102.5 evening jock John Anthony (essentially a transplant of Anthony's 102.5 show "The 80s at 8" in a different time slot), former WECK program director J.R. Russ's syndicated "Movie Ticket Radio", the Polish American Program with Andy Golebiowski (a show featuring Polish music that deliberately avoids the polka heard on other Buffalo stations' Polish shows), and some scattered brokered talk and public affairs programming.

WEBR's music playlist initially focused on traditional pop, classic jazz, occasional beautiful music instrumentals, vocal harmony groups, and selections from the Great American Songbook. The station broadened the playlist in 2021, adding more soft rock, doo-wop and adult contemporary selections. Another revamp of the playlist, dubbed the "Summer Sound of the City," came with the station's first anniversary in 2021, reviving a different set of jingles from the original WEBR and placing an even greater emphasis on soft oldies, with California sound and yacht rock titles. In January 2022, WEBR brought back the Great American Songbook and traditional pop playlist on Sunday evenings, an arrangement that lasted one year. The station was formerly an affiliate of NBC News Radio.

==== Addition of FM translator ====
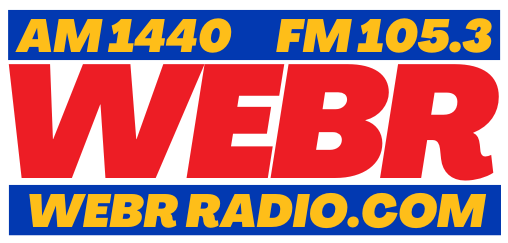
Former logo

In February 2023, WEBR acquired the FM translator that had previously belonged to WLVL (which Yuhnke had acquired at the same time) and flipped to a more explicit classic hits presentation, while maintaining some of its MOR leanings. Venturoli was named program director later that spring; Venturoli then added Mike Jacobs as the new afternoon host, replacing Wahl. Frank Miller succeeded Venturoli as program director in 2024. Miller added Cousin Brucie's new syndicated program in February 2025.

In January 2026, WEBR announced the hiring of Danny Neaverth for a weekly Wednesday night program.

==== The return of Buffalo's Breeze ====
In late February 2023, WEBR acquired another FM translator on 106.9 FM, broadcasting from Grand Island, from Priority Radio. Three years after WTSS (then WMSX) lost its soft adult contemporary music format and the Breeze branding in June 2023, Kenmore Broadcasting Corporation dropped WEBR's oldies format on April 20, 2026, and brought back the old WMSX's "The Breeze" branding and soft adult contemporary music format. This follows Kenmore’s recent acquisition of W295BW bringing the station into Buffalo proper. The station continued to air ethnic programming on weekends alongside its music programming. Syndicated radio host Kadie Daye, a former WYRK morning show host, was added to the station in August 2026. Stilson is scheduled to retire from the station in October, with Darro slated to follow in December.
