= Van Miller =

American sports announcer (1927–2015)

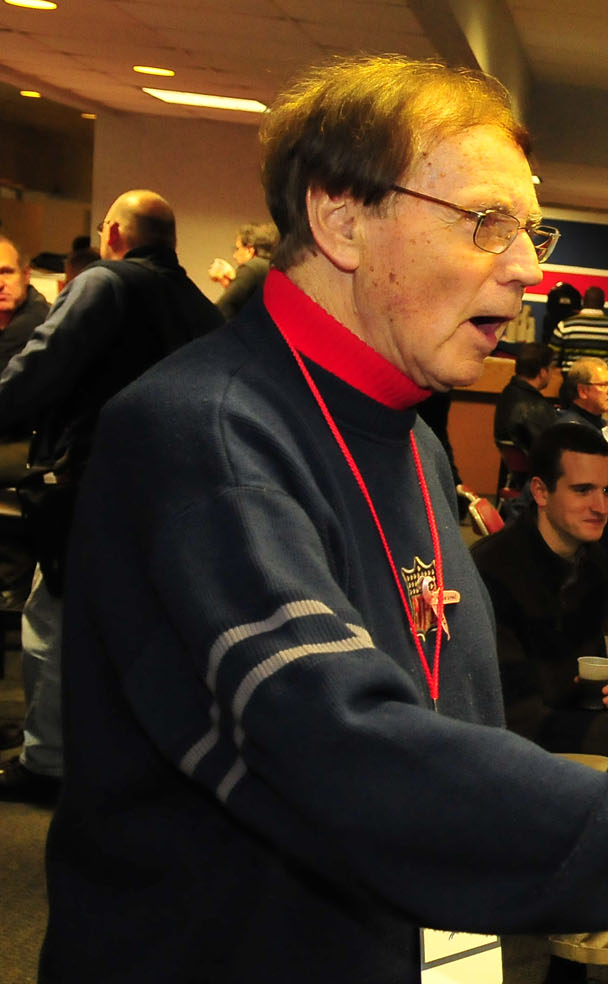
- Miller in 2008
- Born: November 22, 1927; Dunkirk, New York, U.S.
- Died: July 17, 2015 (aged 87); Tonawanda, New York, U.S.
- Years active: 1960–2003

Van Miller (November 22, 1927 – July 17, 2015) was an American radio and television sports announcer from Dunkirk, New York, where he began his career at Dunkirk radio station WFCB calling play-by-play for high school football games. In the 1950s, he moved to Buffalo where he became the chief play-by-play announcer for the Buffalo Bills Radio Network, the official radio broadcasting arm of the Buffalo Bills of the National Football League from the team's inception as an AFL team in 1960 to 1971, and again from 1977 to 2003. At the time of his retirement in 2003, Miller was the longest-tenured commentator with one team (37 years) in pro football history.

== Career ==
On July 30, 1960, Van Miller debuted on the air at War Memorial Stadium to call play-by-play for the Bills' inaugural contest against the Boston Patriots. Besides his status as the "Voice of the Bills," Miller was the sports director for WBEN-TV/WIVB-TV for many years. During that time, he served as a sportscaster, weather reporter, and as host of the local version of It's Academic and Beat the Champ (a ten-pin bowling show), among other shows. Miller also hosted a popular afternoon program for many years on WBEN radio.

Miller called Buffalo Braves and Niagara University basketball, Buffalo Bisons baseball, Buffalo Stallions soccer, University at Buffalo football and, in his early years, high school sports. Miller continued play-by-play for college basketball well into the 1990s for Empire Sports Network, giving the upstart network credibility in its formative years.

With the exception of a seven-season hiatus from 1972 through 1978, when the Bills were being carried on rival station WKBW (and Miller was covering the Buffalo Braves), Miller covered the Bills for most of the team's existence. This period included the AFL championship in 1964 and 1965, and the Super Bowl run of the early 1990s. Miller shared the booth with color men Stan Barron, Jefferson Kaye (a trio known as Van, Stan and Fan, which ended with Barron's death and Kaye's departure to Philadelphia to join NFL Films in 1984) and John Murphy. In 2004, Miller retired and Murphy succeeded him as the Bills' play-by-play voice. Of all of his commentary duties, Miller considered the Bills position his favorite; he took personal regret when WKBW picked up Bills rights in 1972, felt serious discomfort having to wish successor Al Meltzer luck, and expressed great pleasure when WBEN had reacquired rights to the Bills' broadcasts.

Miller's two most famous calls involved plays in which the Bills attempted to lose possession of the ball, both in Super Bowls. The first was Scott Norwood's missed field goal near the end of Super Bowl XXV. Miller also called Jeff Hostetler's game-ending quarterback kneel. However, his most famous call would prove to be Leon Lett's interception and subsequent fumble at Super Bowl XXVII: "Oh Leon, he fumbles!"

In 1995, Miller wrote and performed a song, "I've Got That Phoenix Feeling," which got significant airplay on WBEN and WIVB. Contrary to Miller's prediction, the Bills did not reach Super Bowl XXX, which was played in Phoenix that year.

After 43 years, Miller called his final broadcast for the Bills as they lost 31–0 to the New England Patriots (the same franchise Buffalo had faced for Miller's first broadcast in 1960) in the last game of the 2003 regular season. His headset and spotter boards from his final game are preserved in the archives of the Pro Football Hall of Fame in Canton, Ohio.

== Life after retirement and death ==
Miller retired with Gloria Miller, whom he had married in 1953, in the town of Tonawanda, New York.

During retirement, Miller did guest sports commentary appearances and voiced commercials for some Western New York retail businesses (notably the Grapevine Restaurant, where he was known as "Van the Grapevine Man"). The Pro Football Hall of Fame presented him with its Pete Rozelle Radio-Television Award in 2004. He is an inductee in the Buffalo Broadcasting Hall of Fame (1998), Greater Buffalo Sports Hall of Fame (1999), and the Chautauqua Sports Hall of Fame (2002).

Miller was an avid tennis player and often paired with Jack Ramsay in doubles matches.

Signature calls include: "Fandemonium" – often referring to the celebrations after big Bills wins, "Do you believe it?" after an exciting and often game-changing play, and "Fasten your seatbelts". Miller also had a custom-made routine he used when being interviewed on radio shows, in which he called a fictional game in which the host of the show carries the ball just short of the end zone only to fumble on the goal line, after which Miller mocked anguish.

Miller was inducted onto the Buffalo Bills Wall of Fame on October 19, 2014. Miller suffered various age related health issues in his last years. He died July 17, 2015, at the age of 87, from complications due to a stroke. Most of his estate was auctioned off in February 2017, including a large collection of football memorabilia (Miller received, for instance, championship rings as a member of the Bills staff for every AFL and AFC championship in which the team appeared); he also owned a Maserati.

Media offices
New title	Buffalo Bills announcer 1960–1971	Succeeded by Al Meltzer and Rick Azar
Preceded by Al Meltzer and Rick Azar	Buffalo Bills announcer 1977–2004	Succeeded by John Murphy
Preceded by Chuck Healy	WIVB-TV Sports Anchor –2000	Succeeded by Dennis Williams
