= WCGR =

Radio station in Canandaigua, New York

- Canandaigua, New York; United States
- Broadcast area: Rochester metropolitan area
- Frequency: 1550 kHz
- Branding: 100.1/104.5 The Lake

Programming
- Format: Soft Classic rock
- Affiliations: ABC Radio; Westwood One; New York Giants Radio Network

Ownership
- Owner: Canandaigua Broadcasting, Inc.
- Sister stations: WFLK, WNYR-FM, WGVA, WFLR, WAUB

History
- First air date: 1961
- Former call signs: WCGR (1961–1997); WLKA (1997–1998)

Technical information
- Licensing authority: FCC
- Facility ID: 8504
- Class: D
- Power: 250 watts day
- Transmitter coordinates: 42°52′52″N 77°15′02″W
- Translators: 100.1 W261DR (Victor); 104.5 W283BF (Canandaigua)

Links
- Public license information: Public file; LMS
- Webcast: Listen Live
- Website: lake.fm

WCGR (1550 AM, "100.1/104.5 The Lake") is a radio station broadcasting a soft classic rock format. Licensed to Canandaigua, New York, United States, the station is currently owned by Canandaigua Broadcasting, Inc. and features programming from ABC Radio and Dial Global.

== History ==
The station first went on the air as WCGR in 1961, as a full service middle-of-the-road daytime station with community news. Legendary Miami radio personality Neil Rogers, who was born and grew up in nearby Rochester, is said to have been one of its early announcing staffers. It changed calls to WLKA on June 15, 1997, while moving its WCGR callsign and programming to a full-time, 1000-watt companion facility on 1310 kHz. The 1310 facility was sold the following year to a local religious broadcaster as a companion station to WASB in Brockport, and on October 5, 1998, the 1550 kHz station changed its call sign back to WCGR.

In 2008, WCGR added a simulcast on FM translator W283BF (104.5 MHz), allowing it to broadcast 24 hours a day on the FM band with a signal that covers the local Canandaigua, Victor and Farmington areas with a footprint comparable to the AM signal.

On July 23, 2008, WCGR changed the format of both AM 1550 and 104.5 FM from news/talk, as part of co-owned Finger Lakes News Radio, to oldies music. WCGR management cited clearance issues involving the talk shows that were carried on WCGR via its affiliation with Finger Lakes News Radio, and said competitor WHAM in Rochester would no longer allow WCGR to carry the affected programs as a 24-hour station.

On both AM and FM, the WCGR programming continues to include local news and sports programming from Finger Lakes News Radio.

On the week of August 1, 2011 both 104.5 FM and 1550 AM changed formats from oldies to country, a simulcast from WFLK (Geneva, New York) K 101.7 (hot new country).

On September 1, 2016, WCGR changed their format from country (simulcasting WFLK 101.7 FM) to classic rock, simulcasting WLLW 101.7 FM, branded as "The Wall".

On November 1, 2018, WCGR dropped the WLLW simulcast and switched to a soft classic rock format, branded as "100.1/104.5 The Lake" (simulcast on FM translators W261DR 100.1 FM Victor and W283BF 104.5 FM Canandaigua).

== Previous logo ==
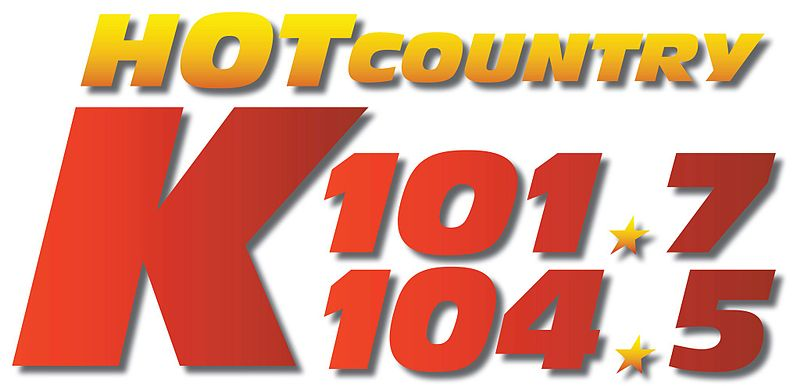
