= WNYR-FM =

Coordinates: 42.806°N 76.846°W

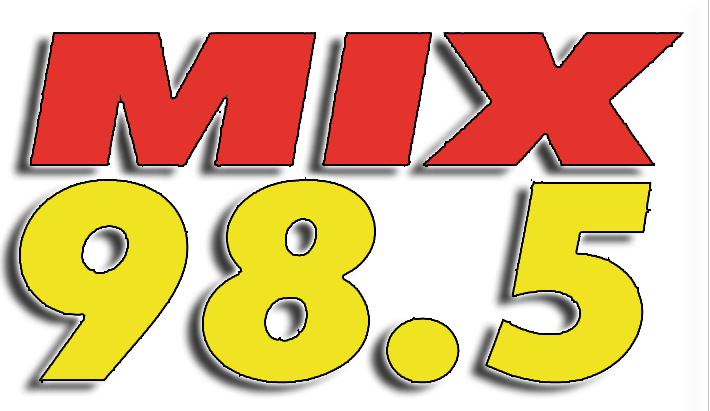
- Waterloo, New York; United States
- Broadcast area: Geneva-Auburn, New York
- Frequency: 98.5 MHz
- Branding: Mix 98.5

Programming
- Format: Adult contemporary
- Affiliations: Compass Media Networks; Premiere Networks

Ownership
- Owner: Finger Lakes Radio Group; (Lake Country Broadcasting, Inc.)
- Sister stations: WAUB; WCGR; WFLK; WFLR; WGVA

History
- First air date: April 19, 1989

Technical information
- Licensing authority: FCC
- Facility ID: 36288
- Class: A
- ERP: 3,200 watts
- HAAT: 136 meters (446 ft)

Links
- Public license information: Public file; LMS
- Webcast: Listen live
- Website: www.fingerlakesdailynews.com/mix-985

WNYR-FM (98.5 MHz) is an adult contemporary music formatted radio station in Waterloo/Geneva, New York. Along with the music, though they also provide Finger Lakes News and events information both through their website and on through the radio. They broadcast throughout the Finger Lakes.
