= Matthew Murphy (New York politician) =

American politician

Matthew J. Murphy Jr. (July 11, 1926 – May 17, 2001) was an American politician from Buffalo, New York. He served as a member of the New York State Assembly from 1974 1992. During his tenure, he served as chairman of the Committee on Tourism.

He is credited as the "father" of the "I Love New York" campaign.

== Family ==
Murphy's son John served as the radio play-by-play announcer for the Buffalo Bills from 2004-2022.
