= WATK =

- Antigo, Wisconsin; United States
- Frequency: 900 kHz
- Branding: Lakes 98.7

Programming
- Format: Classic hits

Ownership
- Owner: Results Broadcasting, Inc.
- Sister stations: WACD, WJMQ, WOTE

History
- First air date: 1948

Technical information
- Licensing authority: FCC
- Facility ID: 433
- Class: D
- Power: 250 watts day 195 watts night
- Transmitter coordinates: 45°6′23.00″N 89°9′9.00″W
- Translator: 98.7 W254AX (Antigo)

Links
- Public license information: Public file; LMS
- Webcast: Listen Live
- Website: WATK Online

WATK (900 AM) is a radio station broadcasting a classic hits format. Licensed to Antigo, Wisconsin, United States. The station is currently owned by Results Broadcasting, Inc.

== History ==
WATK switched from classic country to adult standards in October 2009. The station broadcast the America's Best Music satellite feed from Westwood One.

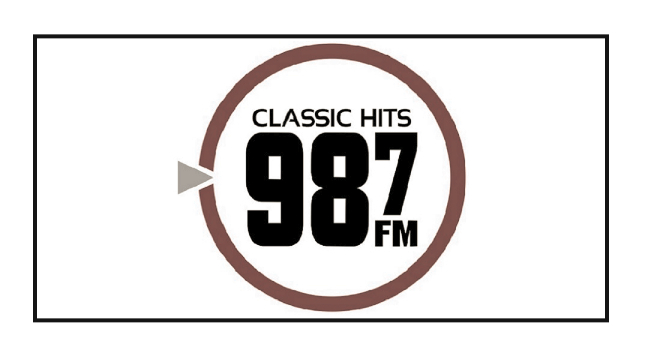
Previous logo

On October 27, 2014, WATK changed their format from adult standards to classic hits, branded as "Classic Hits 98.7" (now simulcasting on FM translator W254AX 98.7 FM Antigo).

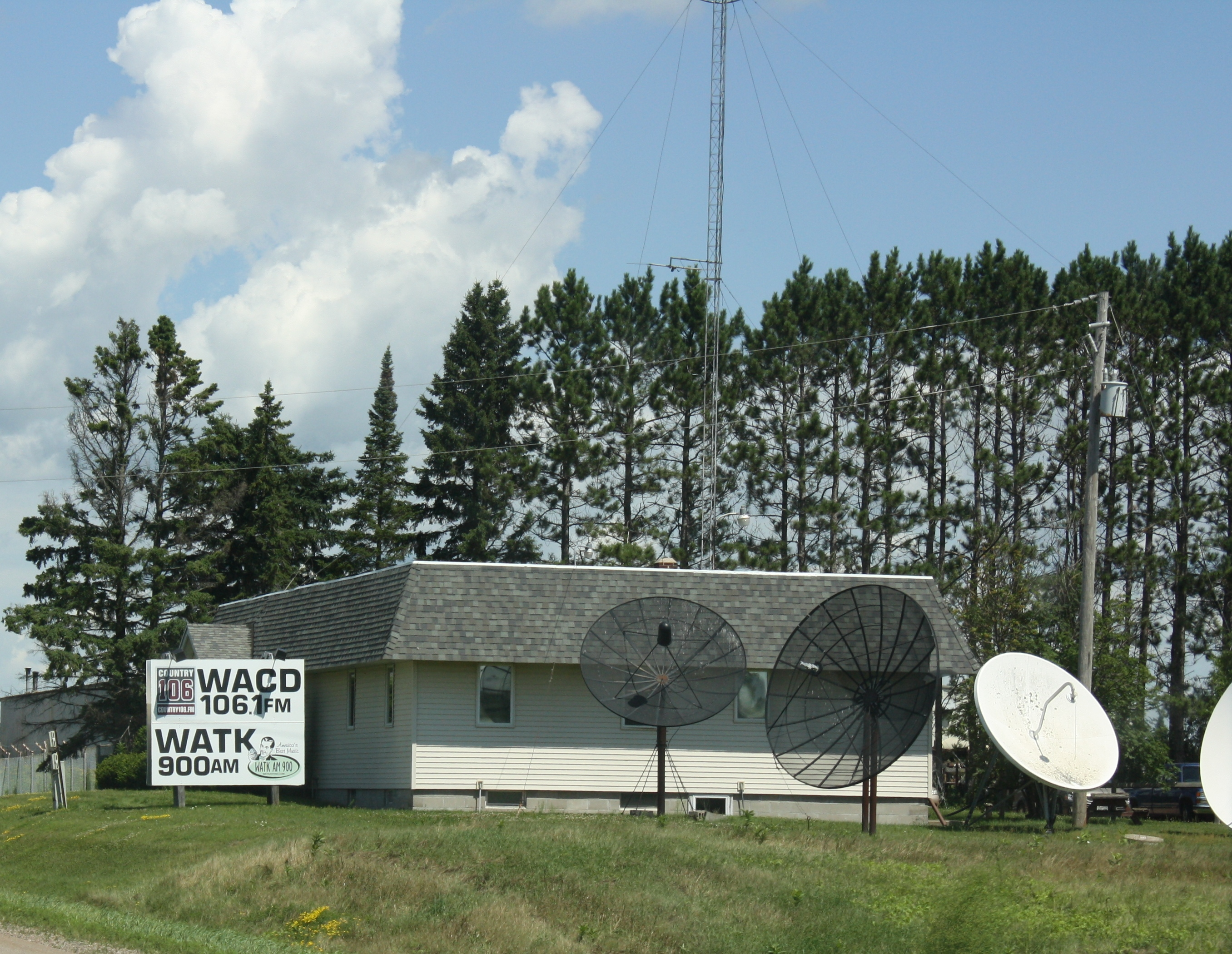
Studios
