= John Murphy (sportscaster) =

Sportscaster in Buffalo, New York from the 1980s to the 2000s

- Born: March 14, 1957 (age 69); Lockport, New York, U.S.
- Education: Syracuse University (B.A.)
- Occupation: Sportscaster
- Years active: 1970s–2022
- Spouse: Mary Travers Murphy
- Children: 2
- Sports commentary career
- Teams: Buffalo Bills, Buffalo Bisons, Buffalo Bulls, Canisius Golden Griffins, Niagara Purple Eagles
- Genres: Play-by-play, color commentary
- Sports: Football, college football, baseball, college basketball

John Murphy (born March 14, 1957) is an American former sportscaster from Buffalo, New York. He is best known as the former voice of the Buffalo Bills Radio Network and host of One Bills Live (formerly The John Murphy Show) on WGR and MSG Western New York. In addition to the Bills, he also served as commentator for the Buffalo Bisons, Canisius College Golden Griffins, Buffalo Bulls and Niagara University Purple Eagles in the 1980s.

== Early life and education ==
Murphy grew up in Lockport, New York. His father, Matthew Murphy, was a member of the New York State Assembly; his brother, Paul Murphy, served as general manager of the Buffalo Niagara Convention Center until his death in December 2020.

Murphy received a degree in broadcasting from the S. I. Newhouse School of Public Communications at Syracuse University in 1978.

== Broadcast career ==
Murphy spent some of his early career at WLVL in his hometown of Lockport, calling high school sports contests. His broadcast partner at WLVL, Frank Williams, would go on to a long career as a play-by-play announcer himself, spending over 30 years at WESB in Bradford, Pennsylvania, though Williams never advanced beyond high school sports.

In November 1984, Stan Barron, the longtime sports director at WBEN, died from thyroid cancer, shortly after calling the Bills' last preseason game of the year. Barron's short-notice death led to Murphy's immediate hiring; Murphy initially served in all of the same capacities that Barron did.

Murphy served as sports director at WBEN from 1984 to 1992 and hosted a talk show on the station until 1995. In 1989, Murphy succeeded Rick Azar as WKBW-TV's 6 PM sports anchor, joining Irv Weinstein and Tom Jolls in Western New York's most popular (at the time) newscast. Murphy was named sports director in 1992, one year after the departure of sports director Bob Koshinski. He held the position for eighteen years, until September 2007, when Murphy balked at taking a twenty-percent pay cut, as other employees had done because of Granite Broadcasting's financial problems.

Murphy remained off television until his non-compete contract clause expired, after which he joined WIVB-TV, WKBW's crosstown rival, in March 2008, to become that station's sports director. He replaced longtime sports director Dennis Williams in the position. Murphy left WIVB in June 2012 to focus full-time on his Bills duties.

During his time at WKBW, he made a cameo in the film Bruce Almighty, the only WKBW anchor to do so.

=== Buffalo Bills ===
Murphy formerly served as the play-by-play voice of the Buffalo Bills radio network, a position he held since the retirement of Van Miller following the 2003 season. Murphy is best known for his association with the Buffalo Bills. From 1984 to 1989, and again from 1994 to 2003, Murphy served as the Bills' color analyst, alongside Miller. From 2012 to 2020, he hosted The John Murphy Show, (later renamed One Bills Live), a Bills-themed talk show on WGR in Buffalo.

On May 9, 2024, Murphy announced his retirement from broadcasting after missing the 2023 season due to a stroke.

== Awards and honors ==
In May 2019, Murphy was announced as an inductee into the Buffalo Broadcasters Association's Hall of Fame. In July 2022, he received the Dick Gallagher Legacy Award from the Greater Buffalo Sports Hall of Fame.

== Other work ==
In September 2023, Murphy released his first book, If These Walls Could Talk: Buffalo Bills: Stories from the Buffalo Bills Sideline, Locker Room, and Press Box.

== Filmography ==
- Bruce Almighty (2003) (as himself)

== Personal life ==
Murphy resides in Orchard Park and is married to former Orchard Park town supervisor (and former WKBW consumer affairs reporter) Mary Travers. Travers and Murphy were the first married couple to work at the same television station in Buffalo at the same time. The couple have two children.

Murphy suffered a stroke between December 31, 2022, and January 1, 2023. Chris Brown, a Bills beat reporter and former play-by-play announcer of the Buffalo Destroyers, has filled in for Murphy since the stroke.

Preceded by Stan Barron	WBEN (AM) Sports Anchor; 1984–1995	Succeeded by Chris "Bulldog" Parker
Preceded by Stan Barron and Jefferson Kaye	Buffalo Bills color commentator 1984–1989	Succeeded by Greg Brown
Preceded by Bob Koshinski	WKBW-TV Sports Anchor; 1989–2007	Succeeded by Jeff Russo
Preceded by Greg Brown	Buffalo Bills color commentator 1994–2004	Succeeded by Alex Van Pelt
Preceded by Van Miller	Buffalo Bills announcer 2004–2022	Succeeded by Chris Brown (interim)
Preceded by Dennis Williams	WIVB-TV Sports Anchor; 2008–2012	Succeeded by Steve Vesey
