= Eric Wood =

American football player (born 1986)

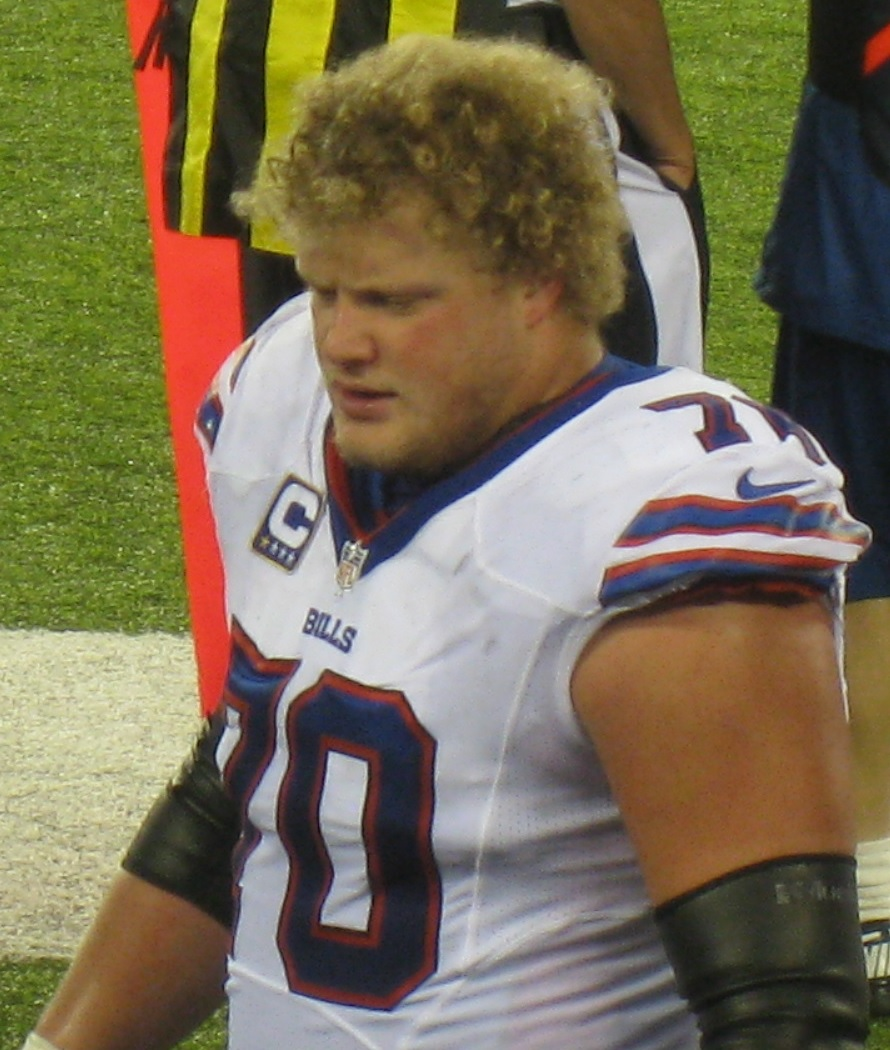
- Wood in 2013

No. 70
- Position: Center

Personal information
- Born: March 18, 1986 (age 40); Cincinnati, Ohio, U.S.
- Listed height: 6 ft 4 in (1.93 m)
- Listed weight: 310 lb (141 kg)

Career information
- High school: Elder (Cincinnati)
- College: Louisville (2004–2008)
- NFL draft: 2009: 1st round, 28th overall pick

Career history
- Buffalo Bills (2009–2017)

Awards and highlights
- Pro Bowl (2015); First-team Freshman All-American (2005); Second-team All-Big East (2006); 2× First-team All-Big East (2007, 2008)

Career NFL statistics
- Games played: 120
- Games started: 120
- Stats at Pro Football Reference

Eric Wood (born March 18, 1986) is an American former professional football player who was a center for the Buffalo Bills of the National Football League (NFL). He played college football for the Louisville Cardinals and was selected in the first round of the 2009 NFL draft by the Bills with the 28th overall pick. Wood played nine seasons in the NFL, including a Pro Bowl appearance, before retiring following the 2017 season due to a neck injury. Since 2019, he has been the color commentator and analyst on the Buffalo Bills Radio Network.

== Early life ==
Wood attended Elder High School in Cincinnati, Ohio, where he played both the tackle and guard positions. His team went 28–2 over the last two seasons, including two consecutive state titles. After playing tight end as a junior, Wood started all 15 games at offensive tackle in his senior year and earned first-team All-League honors.

Considered a two-star recruit by both Rivals.com and Scout.com, Wood was not ranked among the nation's top offensive line prospects. He chose Louisville over Bowling Green, Ohio, Cincinnati, Indiana and Columbia.

== College career ==
After redshirting his initial year at Louisville, Wood started all 12 games at center for the Cardinals in 2005. He earned Freshman All-American honors by Rivals.com, Sporting News and College Football News. Wood was an excellent student, earned Academic All-Big East accolades as well.

Wood remained Louisville's starting center in his sophomore and junior seasons, starting all 13 and 12 games, respectively. Led by quarterback Brian Brohm, the 2007 Cardinals offense ranked sixth nationally with an average of 488.0 yards per game. Wood earned All-Big East honors in both years, and again in his senior season. He finished his career with 49 consecutive starts at center, the second-longest streak in school history behind Travis Leffew (51, 2002–05).

== Professional career ==
Alongside Alex Mack, Wood was considered one of the best centers available in the 2009 NFL draft. He has been compared to Brad Meester by The Sporting News, but his instincts and "nastiness" on the field had scouts comparing him to the NFL's old time centers like Mike Webster of the Pittsburgh Steelers and Tim Grunhard of the Kansas City Chiefs.

Wood was selected with the 28th pick of the 2009 NFL draft by the Buffalo Bills, using the pick acquired from the Philadelphia Eagles via a trade for Jason Peters. With Mack being selected with the 21st pick by the Cleveland Browns, at marked the first time two centers were drafted in round one since the 1983 NFL draft, with Dave Rimington and Don Mosebar.

Pre-draft measurables
Height	Weight	Arm length	Hand span	40-yard dash	10-yard split	20-yard split	20-yard shuttle	Three-cone drill	Vertical jump	Broad jump	Bench press
6 ft 3 7/8 in (1.93 m)	310 lb (141 kg)	33 3/4 in (0.86 m)	10 3/8 in (0.26 m)	5.24 s	1.83 s	3.02 s	4.51 s	7.56 s	30.5 in (0.77 m)	8 ft 3 in (2.51 m)	30 reps
All values from NFL Combine

In his rookie season, Wood was counted on to start at right guard. He joined a completely retooled Bills offensive line that was expected to feature two rookie starters—him, and second-round pick Andy Levitre at left guard—and no players returning to the same position. On July 28, 2009, Wood signed a five-year contract with the Bills, reportedly worth more than $12 million.

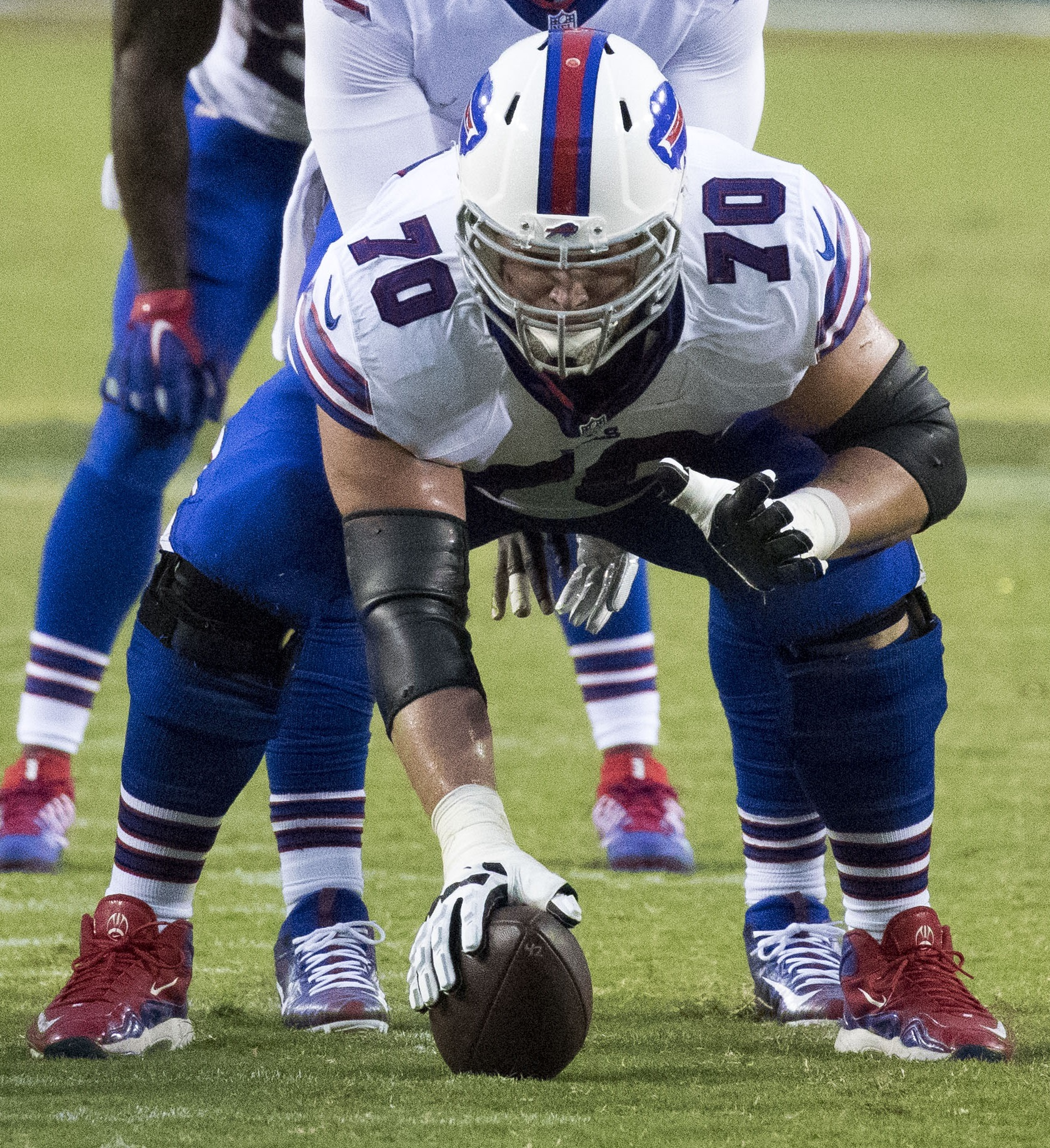
Wood in 2016

Wood immediately became the Bills starting right offensive guard next to center Geoff Hangartner, with Levitre at left guard. On November 22, 2009, in his 10th game, Wood fractured his tibia and fibula in the fourth quarter of an 18–15 loss to the Jacksonville Jaguars, after Jaguars defensive tackle Montavious Stanley ran into Wood's leg. Wood underwent season-ending surgery in a Jacksonville hospital and did not return to Buffalo with the team. He was placed on the injured reserve list on November 24, 2009.

On March 30, 2010, Wood told the Buffalo Bills that his leg was healing well and that he gave it an 80% chance to be ready for training camp. He eventually started 14 games in the 2010 NFL season, missing only Steelers and Vikings games because of an ankle injury. The Bills were playing the same trio up the middle: Wood at right guard, Hangartner at center, and Levitre at left guard.

In 2011, Wood was switched to center, between Levitre and new starting right guard Kraig Urbik. These three have been instrumental in the resurgence in the Bills offense, led by Ryan Fitzpatrick at quarterback and Fred Jackson at running back. However, he was hurt in game 9 and did not play the rest of the year, replaced first by Urbik and then by Colin Brown.

In 2015, the NFL announced Wood as one of the 32 players honored as the Bills' Man of the Year and eligible to win the Walter Payton NFL Man of the Year Award.

It was reported that Wood suffered a broken leg playing in a game against the Seattle Seahawks on November 7, 2016. The Bills reported that this injury would keep Wood out for the remainder of the season. He was placed on injured reserve on November 14, 2016.

On August 26, 2017, Wood signed a two-year, $16 million contract extension with the Bills.

On January 26, 2018, after the Bills made their first playoff appearance since 1999, Wood announced that he had failed his end-of-season physical and would no longer be cleared to play professional football. Adam Schefter of ESPN said the cause of the failed physical, a neck injury, was partially due to wear and tear, but also part of a "complicated medical situation" (Wood later specified that the disc between his second and third vertebrae had come dangerously close to his spinal cord, which he suspected happened during the week 6 game of the 2017 season). Wood had played through the entire 2017 season, handling every offensive snap that year without missing any. He had intended to wait until after the 2018 Pro Bowl to announce the injury; he had been designated as an alternate to the game and did not consider his condition to be a hindrance to playing in the game. News of the injury had leaked to the press two days before the game, and the two Pro Bowlers named to the position for the AFC both played in the game. He reached an injury settlement with the Bills on May 31, 2018, and was officially released.

== Post-playing career ==
In September 2018, Wood signed on as a columnist for The Athletic. He replaced Mark Kelso as color commentator on the Buffalo Bills Radio Network in 2019. Wood opted out of the 2020 season due to travel difficulties associated with the coronavirus pandemic, but returned in 2021. Wood currently hosts the Centered on Buffalo podcast.

Wood was named a community ambassador for the Louisville Kings of the United Football League in 2025 upon the team's launch.

== Personal life ==
Wood is a Christian. He is married to Leslie Wood. They have one daughter and one son together.

Wood created The Evan Wood Fund for John R. Oishei Children's Hospital. The fund is named after his brother Evan Wood who had cerebral palsy and died when he was 11 years old.

Wood is a board member for Kids Cancer Alliance.

Wood was inducted into the Kentucky Pro Football Hall of Fame in 2020.
