= WOTE =

- Clintonville, Wisconsin; United States
- Frequency: 1380 kHz
- Branding: The Franchise Sports Radio

Programming
- Format: Sports
- Affiliations: Fox Sports Radio

Ownership
- Owner: Results Broadcasting, Inc.
- Sister stations: WATK, WACD, WJMQ

History
- First air date: 1983 (as WFCL)
- Former call signs: WRJQ (1981–1982); WFCL (1982–2008)

Technical information
- Licensing authority: FCC
- Facility ID: 58582
- Class: B
- Power: 3,900 watts day 1,800 watts night
- Transmitter coordinates: 44°34′1.00″N 88°44′33.00″W
- Translators: 94.9 W235CQ (Clintonville); 96.5 W243CM (Shawano)

Links
- Public license information: Public file; LMS

WOTE (1380 AM) is a radio station broadcasting a sports format with programming from Fox Sports Radio. Licensed to Clintonville, Wisconsin, United States, the station is currently owned by Results Broadcasting, Inc.

== History ==
The station was assigned the call letters WRJQ on June 8, 1981. On December 29, 1982, the station changed its call sign to WFCL and, on September 29, 2008, to the current WOTE.

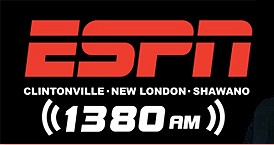
Former logo
