= WLRV =

- Lebanon, Virginia; United States
- Broadcast area: Lebanon, Virginia; Russell County, Virginia
- Frequency: 1380 kHz
- Branding: Victory Radio 1380 WLRV

Programming
- Format: Southern gospel

Ownership
- Owner: Spring City Baptist Church; (Psalm 68 Eleven Media, LLC)

History
- First air date: October 28, 1974
- Call sign meaning: Lebanon Russell Virginia or Where Lives Receive Victory

Technical information
- Licensing authority: FCC
- Facility ID: 29514
- Class: D
- Power: 1,000 watts (day); 63 watts (night)
- Transmitter coordinates: 36°55′18.0″N 82°6′16.0″W

Links
- Public license information: Public file; LMS
- Webcast: Listen live
- Website: wlrv.com

WLRV is a Southern Gospel formatted broadcast radio station licensed to Lebanon, Virginia. WLRV serves Lebanon and Russell County, Virginia. WLRV is owned and operated by Spring City Baptist Church.

== History ==
WLRV fell silent on June 1, 2016 due to financial problems and family illness. The station was purchased by Spring City Baptist Church, and returned to the airwaves in May 2017 with a Southern Gospel format.
