= KVSM =

- Santa Maria, California; United States
- Broadcast area: Santa Maria, California
- Frequency: 1380 kHz
- Branding: La Raza 102.1 y 1380 AM

Programming
- Format: Regional Mexican

Ownership
- Owner: Cristian Martinez

History
- First air date: 2015

Technical information
- Licensing authority: FCC
- Facility ID: 161424
- Class: B
- Power: 650 watts (day); 500 watts (night)
- Transmitter coordinates: 34°58′47.9″N 120°27′15.6″W
- Translator: 102.1 K271BV (Orcutt)

Links
- Public license information: Public file; LMS

KVSM (1380 AM) is a commercial radio station licensed to Santa Maria, California, United States, and broadcasting to the Santa Maria area. The station is owned by Cristian Martinez. and airs a regional Mexican music format. KVSM is rebroadcast on FM translator K271BV in Orcutt on 102.1 MHz.

== History ==
The station was assigned the KVSM call letters on July 24, 2013.

In August 2017, Ether Mining Group sold KVSM to Cristian Martinez for $300,000 plus a time brokerage arrangement; this transaction also included usage rights to FM translator K271BV in Orcutt, owned by Edgewater Broadcasting. The sale closed in December that same year.
