= WFNW =

- Naugatuck, Connecticut; United States
- Broadcast area: Central Naugatuck Valley
- Frequency: 1380 kHz
- Branding: Rádio Press

Programming
- Format: Portuguese contemporary hit radio

Ownership
- Owner: Candido Dias Carrelo

History
- First air date: February 26, 1961
- Former call signs: WNTE (1959-1960 (CP)); WOWW (1960–1978); WNVR (1978–1985); WNAQ (1985–1989); WFLK (1989); WNAQ (1989)

Technical information
- Licensing authority: FCC
- Facility ID: 8517
- Class: B
- Power: 3,500 watts (day); 350 watts (night)
- Transmitter coordinates: 41°30′38.35″N 73°3′16.39″W

Links
- Public license information: Public file; LMS
- Webcast: Listen live
- Website: wfnw1380am.weebly.com

WFNW (1380 KHz, "Rádio Press") is a radio station licensed to Naugatuck, Connecticut. The station is owned by Candido Dias Carrelo. It airs a Portuguese contemporary radio format. The station has been assigned the WFNW call letters by the Federal Communications Commission since February 13, 1989.

By day, WFNW is powered at 3,500 watts. At night, to avoid interference with other stations on 1380 AM, it reduces power to 350 watts. WFNW uses a directional antenna at all times, its transmitter is on Thunderbird Drive in Naugatuck.
