= Chris Brown (sportscaster) =

American sportscaster

- Born: c. 1972 (age 53–54); United States
- Education: University of Missouri
- Occupations: Sportscaster, television host
- Years active: 1980s–present
- Employer: CBS Sports
- Known for: NFL and sports broadcasting
- Notable work: NFL Today

Christopher Brown (born c. 1972) is an American sportscaster who is currently the play-by-play announcer for the Buffalo Bills of the National Football League.

== Career ==
Brown began his career in July 1997 as the Bills' beat reporter for WGR 550 in Buffalo, a position he held until 2003. In 2006, he officially joined the organization as a writer for the Bills website, Bills Insider and Shout magazines.

In May 2020, Brown became an interim host of One Bills Live, a daily sports talk show on WGR, following the departure of John Murphy, paired with Steve Tasker.

In January 2023, Brown replaced Murphy as the play-by-play announcer for the Buffalo Bills Radio Network after the latter suffered a stroke. After the retirement of Murphy in May 2024, the Bills announced Brown to become the full time play-by-play announcer for the Bills in July 2024.

He currently co-hosts the Bills By The Numbers podcast.
