= WGVA =

- Geneva, New York; United States
- Broadcast area: Finger Lakes
- Frequency: 1240 kHz

Programming
- Format: Talk radio
- Affiliations: ABC News Radio; Fox News Radio; Compass Media Networks; Genesis Communications Network; Premiere Networks; USA Radio Network; Westwood One; Buffalo Bills Radio Network; Syracuse Orangemen Radio Network

Ownership
- Owner: Geneva Broadcasting Inc
- Sister stations: WAUB, WCGR, WFLK, WFLR, WNYR-FM

History
- First air date: 1947 (79 years ago)
- Call sign meaning: Geneva

Technical information
- Licensing authority: FCC
- Facility ID: 36290
- Class: C
- Power: 1,000 watts
- Transmitter coordinates: 42°51′37″N 77°0′59″W
- Translator: 106.3 W292FG (Geneva)

Links
- Public license information: Public file; LMS
- Webcast: Listen Live
- Website: fingerlakesdailynews.com/96-1240-wgva

WGVA (1240 AM) is a commercial radio station licensed to Geneva, New York. The station is part of the Finger Lakes Radio Group, and is owned by Geneva Broadcasting, Inc. WGVA simulcasts a talk radio format with co-owned WAUB (1590 AM) in Auburn.

WGVA is powered at 1,000 watts, using a non-directional antenna. Programming is also heard on 250 watt FM translator W292FG at 106.3 MHz.

== Programming ==
Weekdays begin with a news and information show hosted by Ted Baker. The rest of the weekday schedule is mostly nationally syndicated talk shows from Brian Kilmeade, Dave Ramsey, Mark Levin, Ben Shapiro, Jared Dillian, Jim Bohannon and Coast to Coast AM with George Noory. Weekends feature shows on money, health, the outdoors, home improvement, science, law, cars, travel and gardening. Weekend hosts include Rudy Maxa, Dr. Michio Kaku and Lee Habeeb.

WGVA and WAUB carry Syracuse Orangemen football and Buffalo Bills NFL football. Most hours begin with world and national news from CBS Radio News.

== History ==
In 1947, WGVA first signed on the air. It was owned by the Star Broadcasting Company. WGVA was originally powered at only 250 watts; by the late 1970s, it got a construction permit from the Federal Communications Commission to increase its daytime power to 1,000 watts, while keeping 250 watts of power at night.

Prior to the talk radio format that is in effect today, WGVA was an upbeat Top 40 radio station. It had a full-time team of disc jockeys and newscasters. The station played the big hits of the 1960s and 1970s. By the 1980s, the station switched to full service adult contemporary. Talk shows were added and over time, the station made the transition to all-talk.

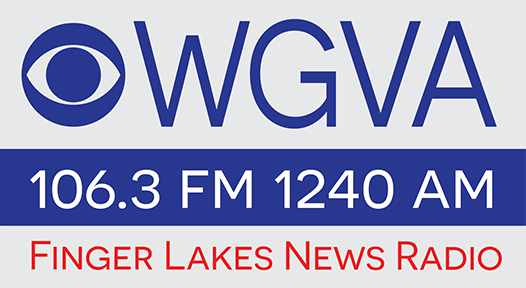
Logo under CBS affiliation
