= WHEW =

- Franklin, Tennessee; United States
- Broadcast area: Nashville, Tennessee
- Frequency: 1380 kHz
- Branding: Bonita 1380

Programming
- Language: Spanish
- Format: Spanish Variety

Ownership
- Owner: SG Communications, Inc.

History
- Former call signs: WIZO (1969–1996)

Technical information
- Licensing authority: FCC
- Facility ID: 681
- Class: D
- Power: 2,800 watts (day only)
- Transmitter coordinates: 35°54′22″N 86°54′21″W

Links
- Public license information: Public file; LMS
- Website: bonita1380amradio.com

WHEW (1380 AM, "Bonita 1380") is an American radio station licensed to serve the community of Franklin, Tennessee. The station's broadcast license is held by SG Communications, Inc.

== Programming ==
WHEW broadcasts a Spanish Variety format branded as "Bonita 1380".

== History ==
It used to be licensed to an earlier ownership group as WIZO, and was assigned the call sign "WHEW" by the U.S. Federal Communications Commission (FCC) on October 1, 1996. Following a series of missteps by the licensee, WHEW's call sign was deleted from the FCC database and the broadcast license cancelled in August 2012. After a lengthy appeal, the station was fully reinstated in September 2013.
