= WAUB =

- Auburn, New York; United States
- Broadcast area: Finger Lakes
- Frequency: 1590 kHz

Programming
- Format: Talk radio
- Affiliations: ABC News Radio; Fox News Radio; Compass Media Networks; Genesis Communications Network; Premiere Networks; USA Radio Network; Westwood One; Buffalo Bills Radio Network; Syracuse Orangemen Radio Network

Ownership
- Owner: Auburn Broadcasting, Inc.
- Sister stations: WCGR, WFLK, WFLR, WGVA, WNYR-FM

History
- First air date: December 24, 1959 (66 years ago)
- Call sign meaning: Auburn

Technical information
- Licensing authority: FCC
- Facility ID: 43791
- Class: B
- Power: 450 watts day; 1,000 watts night
- Transmitter coordinates: 42°54′34″N 76°36′9″W
- Translator: 96.3 W242DC (Auburn)

Links
- Public license information: Public file; LMS
- Webcast: Listen Live
- Website: fingerlakesdailynews.com

WAUB (1590 AM) is a commercial radio station licensed to Auburn, New York. The station is part of the Finger Lakes Radio Group, and is owned by Auburn Broadcasting, Inc. WAUB simulcasts a talk radio format with co-owned WGVA (1240 AM) in Geneva.

By day, WAUB is powered at 450 watts. At night power increases to 1,000 watts. WAUB uses a directional antenna at all times to protect other stations on 1590 AM. Programming is also heard on 250 watt FM translator 96.3 W242DC in Auburn.

== Programming ==
Weekdays begin with a news and information show hosted by Ted Baker. The rest of the weekday schedule is mostly nationally syndicated talk shows from Brian Kilmeade, Dave Ramsey, Mark Levin, Ben Shapiro, Jared Dillian, Jim Bohannon and Coast to Coast AM with George Noory. Weekends feature shows on money, health, the outdoors, home improvement, science, law, cars, travel and gardening. Weekend hosts include Rudy Maxa, Dr. Michio Kaku and Lee Habeeb.

WAUB and WGVA carry Syracuse Orangemen football and Buffalo Bills NFL football. Most hours begin with world and national news from CBS Radio News.

== History ==
On December 24, 1959, WAUB first signed on the air. It began as a 500 watt daytimer station, required to go off the air at sunset. It was owned by the Atom Broadcasting Company.

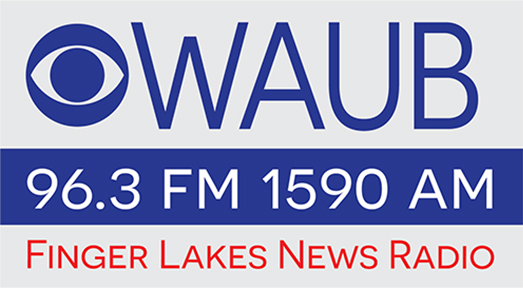
Logo under CBS affiliation
