= Mary Travers Murphy =

Social Activist

Mary Travers Murphy (born July 31, 1958) is the executive director of the Family Justice Center of Erie County, New York. She was formerly a consumer affairs journalist and was part of the Action 7 news team on ABC affiliate WKBW-TV, based in Buffalo. She left that position in June 2004. Prior to joining WKBW, Travers was a reporter for WEBR.

In 2005 she was elected to a four-year term as town supervisor of Orchard Park, New York. In 2009, she did not seek re-election.

== Personal life ==
She is married to John Murphy, the play-by-play announcer for the Buffalo Bills. Travers and Murphy were the first married couple to work at the same television station in the Buffalo market at the same time.

Her hobbies include cooking for her family, worship, reading novels, NPR, & antique ceramics.
