= WBRR =

- Bradford, Pennsylvania; United States
- Broadcast area: Northwestern PA and Southwestern NY
- Frequency: 100.1 MHz
- Branding: 100.1 The Hero

Programming
- Format: Mainstream rock
- Affiliations: United Stations Radio Networks; Buffalo Bills Radio Network

Ownership
- Owner: WESB Incorporated; (Radio Station WESB, Inc.)
- Sister stations: WESB

History
- First air date: 1987; 39 years ago
- Call sign meaning: Bradford Radio

Technical information
- Licensing authority: FCC
- Facility ID: 54826
- Class: A
- ERP: 1,650 watts
- HAAT: 160 meters
- Transmitter coordinates: 41°57′54.00″N 78°37′1.00″W

Links
- Public license information: Public file; LMS
- Webcast: Listen live
- Website: wesb.com/hero/

WBRR (100.1 FM) is a radio station in Bradford, Pennsylvania. The station, operated by sister station WESB, is a classic-leaning mainstream rock format station branded as "100.1 The Hero" (HERO having originated with a previous format as an acronym for "High Energy Rockin' Oldies").

All staff is shared with WESB.

For most of the 1990s and early 2000s, WBRR was an oldies outlet known as "Cool 100". In 2007, major changes were made to the morning show (adding Scott Douglas, who was previously the morning host and program director at classic rock WQRS; Douglas left the station in 2014) and shifted formats to classic rock. In August 2008, Igor was tapped to do nights on WBRR. Igor joined after working at 100.7 WMMS and 92.3 WORM Xtreme Radio in Cleveland and Q92 WIMP in Canton, Ohio. The station subsequently shifted its format to a mainstream rock mix of 1990s’ and New Old Rock. WBRR has filled a niche as the western Twin Tiers' only rock station.

In 2024, WBRR dropped its local morning show in favor of an iHeartMedia syndicated Woody and Wilcox program; local hosts continue to be heard in the midday and afternoon shifts and for local news inserts. In 2024, WBRR signed an agreement with St. Bonaventure University to become the broadcast home of the St. Bonaventure Bonnies men's and women's basketball games; it is only the second such agreement in St. Bonaventure's history, as WPIG had been the flagship for the previous 74 years for the men's team (the women's team had been on several other stations) until WPIG's owners chose not to renew in 2023.
