= WACD =

- Antigo, Wisconsin; United States
- Frequency: 106.1 MHz
- Branding: All Hit Country 106.1

Programming
- Format: Country

Ownership
- Owner: Results Broadcasting, Inc.
- Sister stations: WATK

Technical information
- Licensing authority: FCC
- Facility ID: 49814
- Class: C3
- ERP: 10,000 watts
- HAAT: 84 meters
- Transmitter coordinates: 45°6′23.00″N 89°9′9.00″W

Links
- Public license information: Public file; LMS
- Webcast: Listen Live
- Website: WACD Online

WACD (106.1 FM) is a radio station broadcasting a country music format. Licensed to Antigo, Wisconsin, U.S., the station is currently owned by Results Broadcasting, Inc.

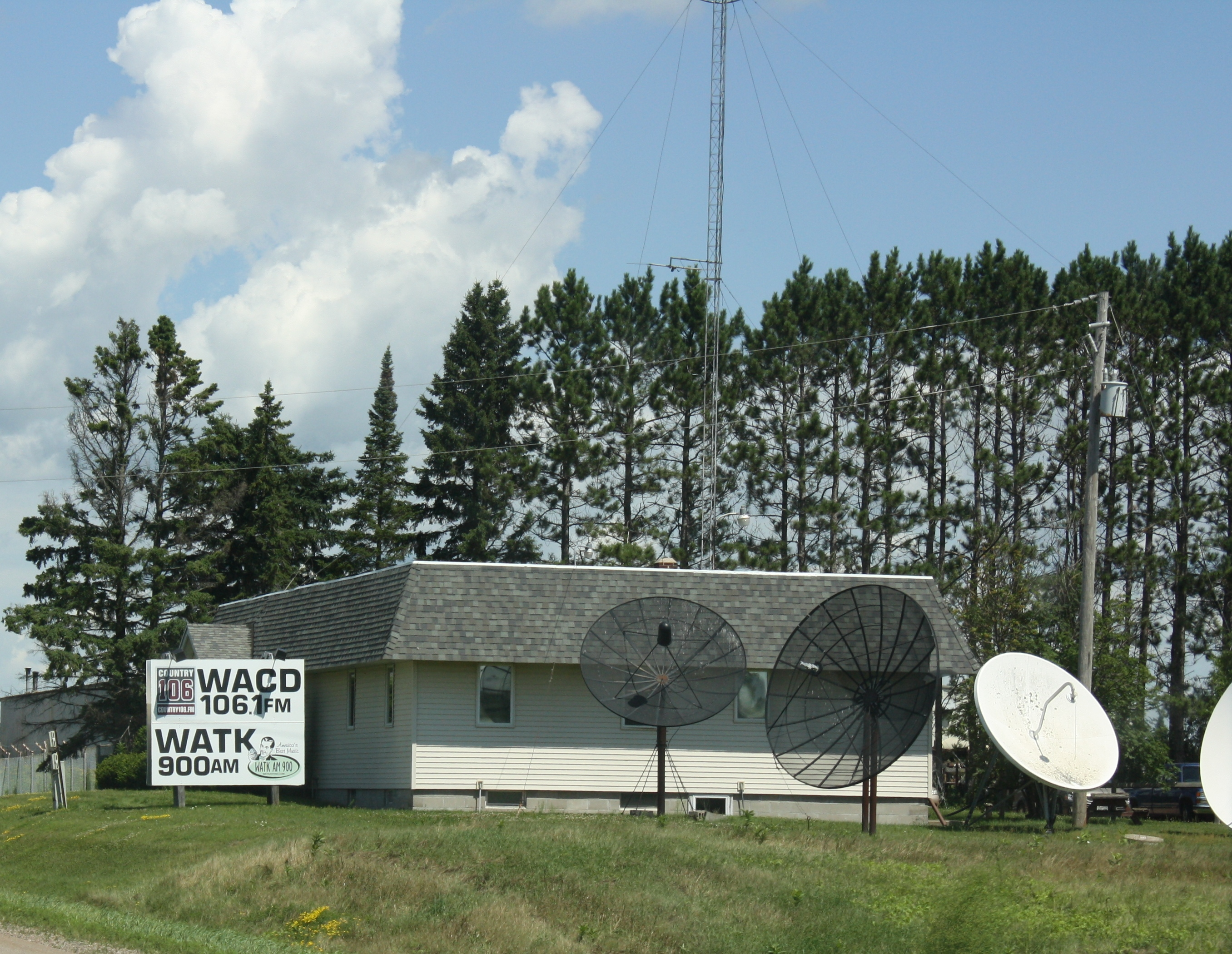
Studios

Previous logo
