= Mark Kelso =

American football player and color commentator (born 1963)

No. 38
- Position: Safety

Personal information
- Born: July 23, 1963 (age 63); Pittsburgh, Pennsylvania, U.S.
- Listed height: 5 ft 11 in (1.80 m)
- Listed weight: 177 lb (80 kg)

Career information
- High school: North Hills (Ross Township, Pennsylvania)
- College: William & Mary
- NFL draft: 1985: 10th round, 261st overall pick

Career history
- Philadelphia Eagles (1985)*; Buffalo Bills (1986–1993)
- * Offseason or practice squad member only

Awards and highlights
- Byron "Whizzer" White NFL Man of the Year Award (1993)

Career NFL statistics
- Interceptions: 30
- Fumble recoveries: 8
- Touchdowns: 3
- Stats at Pro Football Reference

Mark Alan Kelso (born July 23, 1963) is an American former professional football player who was a safety for the Buffalo Bills of the National Football League (NFL). He appeared in four consecutive Super Bowls with the Bills from 1990 to 1993, and served as the color commentator for the Buffalo Bills Radio Network from 2006 until 2019.

== Early life ==
Kelso attended North Hills High School and the College of William & Mary. At William & Mary, Kelso recorded the second-highest interception total in school history with 20. In 1983, Kelso recorded 141 tackles, third all-time in a single season for a player of any position at William & Mary and the most ever by a safety.

== Playing career ==
Kelso was selected by the Philadelphia Eagles in the tenth round of the 1985 NFL draft. He played in eight NFL seasons and his entire career with the Buffalo Bills, from 1986 to 1993. His peak performance as a pro came during the 1988 season when he had intercepted seven passes for 180 yards and one touchdown. Kelso recorded seven interceptions again in 1992 and twice recorded six interceptions in a season (1987 and 1989). He started 99 regular-season games in his NFL career, and 16 playoff games. Kelso was elected as a captain and started in the Bill's four consecutive Super Bowl appearances from 1990 to 1993. His thirty career interceptions rank third all-time for the Bills. Kelso is the recipient of the 1994 "Byron Whizzer White" NFL Man of the Year Award which awards annually one NFL player who goes above and beyond to perform community service in his hometown and team city. He was well known for wearing a "pro cap" on his helmet which was used to reduce the risk of concussions.

== Broadcasting, coaching, and other work ==
From 2006 until 2018, Kelso served as the color commentator for Buffalo Bills radio broadcasts on both WGRF 96.9 FM and WGR 550. He was the development director at Saint Mary's High School in Lancaster, New York, as well as its varsity football defensive coordinator, from the 2003 to 2010 seasons. Kelso left his position at Saint Mary's in order to work with a Georgia-based company named The Hanson Group. Kelso also is a local baseball coach. Prior to that he taught fifth grade at Main Street Elementary School in East Aurora, New York.

Since at least 2018, Kelso has also worked for JTG Daugherty Racing.
