= Al Meltzer =

American sportscaster

- Born: June 26, 1928
- Died: June 12, 2018 (aged 89)
- Other name: Big Al
- Occupation: Sportscaster
- Years active: 1940s–2003
- Height: 6 ft 4 in (193 cm)

Al Meltzer (June 26, 1928 – June 12, 2018), nicknamed "Big Al", was an American sportscaster.

Born in Syracuse, New York, Meltzer worked as a sportscaster for Philadelphia television stations KYW-TV and WCAU, as well as WMAQ-TV in Chicago and for Comcast SportsNet as sports director. He also worked for WPHL-TV where he called play-by-play of Big 5 and 76ers basketball. He has also covered the Philadelphia Eagles, Philadelphia Phillies, and Temple Owls. Previously, he worked in Buffalo, New York at WEBR. He is a member of the Jewish Sports Hall of Fame, Big 5 Hall of Fame, the Philadelphia Sports Hall of Fame and Broadcast Pioneers of Philadelphia Hall of Fame. During the 1970s, Meltzer, while still living in Philadelphia, commuted to Buffalo to serve as the Buffalo Bills Radio Network play-by-play announcer, serving on a team with Rick Azar and Ed Rutkowski. He died at the age of 89 on June 12, 2018.

Meltzer occasionally did voice-over work for NFL Films and was a substitute host for NFL Films' weekly wrapup, This Week in Pro Football (This Week in the NFL starting in 1974).
