= Rick Azar =

American sportscaster (1929–2021)

- Born: Ricardo Carballada; April 24, 1929; Buffalo, New York
- Died: March 25, 2021 (aged 91); Williamsville, New York
- Occupation: Broadcaster
- Years active: 1958–early 2010s
- Employer: WKBW-TV
- Children: 4

Ricardo Carballada (April 24, 1929 – March 25, 2021), known professionally as Rick Azar, was an American broadcaster who spent 31 years at WKBW-TV in Buffalo, New York.

== WKBW-TV career ==
Azar began his career at WHLD and WUSJ, the radio stations in Niagara County, New York; it was at WUSJ that Azar, then known as Dick Corey, was first co-employed with Tom Jolls. Prior to coming to WKBW, Azar was an actor and musician in New York City, as well as a staff announcer for NBC in New York, leaving New York City after failing to secure long-term employment there.

Azar did not become sports director at WKBW until 1965, when the station's original sports director, Stan Barron, left for WBEN-TV; Irv Weinstein moved over from AM 1520 to become news director, while Jolls, then working at WBEN-TV, came over to WKBW-TV to rejoin Azar. Azar, Jolls and Weinstein held their respective positions until Azar's retirement in June 1989. Azar also hosted Buffalo Bandstand, a local franchising of American Bandstand, and on at least one occasion substitute hosted the national show in place of Dick Clark.

Azar also served as a color analyst on WKBW's (now WWKB) radio broadcast of the Buffalo Bills games, play-by-play man on the Bills preseason games televised on WKBW-TV and an intermission host on Buffalo Sabres hockey games televised in the 1970s on Ch 7. Azar also did basketball play-by-play on St. Bonaventure basketball games on Ch 7 during the Bob Lanier era. Azar was noted for his tough, blunt personality and willingness to editorialize on-air in an era when sports talk was not yet a developed medium.

Azar denied rumors that he retired from WKBW in 1989 at 60 years old because of the station's change in ownership (from Capital Cities Communications to Queen City Broadcasting) nor any contract-related disputes. He instead stated that, though he was comfortable being in the public spotlight, he did not feel an overwhelming need for it and felt that he retired at the right time. Such was Azar's popularity that one of the sports anchors hired to replace him (the unrelated Jerry Azar) was chosen specifically because his last name was also Azar.

== Personal life ==
Azar was born in Buffalo but grew up in Brooklyn before returning to Buffalo at the start of World War II. Azar was a graduate of St. Joseph's Collegiate Institute and Canisius College; he chose the surname Azar as a nod to his Hispanic ancestry, as many Spaniard names ended with "-azar." His brother, Carlos Carballada, briefly served as interim mayor of Rochester, New York in 2011 and currently serves as Rochester's commissioner of community and economic development. With his wife, he had four children. He spent much of his retirement in Whispering Pines, North Carolina before returning to Buffalo in 2014.

Azar died March 25, 2021, at age 91 at Millard Fillmore Suburban Hospital in Williamsville, New York, following years of old age-related decline.

Preceded by Stan Barron	WKBW-TV sports director 1965–1989	Succeeded by Bob Koshinski
Preceded by Van Miller	Buffalo Bills announcer (with Al Meltzer); 1971–1977	Succeeded by Van Miller
