= WESB =

- Bradford, Pennsylvania; United States
- Broadcast area: Bradford, Pennsylvania
- Frequency: 1490 kHz
- Branding: B107.5

Programming
- Format: Hot adult contemporary
- Affiliations: ABC News Radio; Westwood One

Ownership
- Owner: WESB Incorporated; (Radio Station WESB, Inc.)
- Sister stations: WBRR

History
- First air date: April 5, 1947
- Call sign meaning: WE Serve Bradford

Technical information
- Licensing authority: FCC
- Facility ID: 54827
- Class: C
- Power: 1,000 watts unlimited
- Transmitter coordinates: 41°57′54.00″N 78°37′1.00″W
- Translator: 107.5 W298CM (Bradford)

Links
- Public license information: Public file; LMS
- Website: wesb.com

WESB (1490 AM) is a radio station licensed to Bradford, Pennsylvania, United States. The station is locally owned under the name "WESB Incorporated." Its sister station is WBRR.

== History ==
Previous logo

The station is a full-service music station with a news department. The national news is provided by ABC Flex Network. Sports coverage includes Bradford High School, Pittsburgh Pirates, NFL Sunday Night Football, NFL Monday Night Football, NFL Thursday Night Football, and NCAA college basketball.

Local hosts and shows include Community Spotlight with news director Andy Paulsen; the All Request Cafe 80’s Lunch with Igor; and Sports Reports with Jimmy Keltz. The syndicated Bob and Sheri Show airs weekday mornings.

On September 17, 2018, WESB signed on an FM translator on 107.5 MHz, also shifting its format to hot adult contemporary and rebranded to B107.5.

The station also carries the very popular listener call-in Gardening Show with Master Gardener Bob Harris, co-hosted by Anne Holliday, from May through October.

== Awards ==
- Anne Holliday wins PAB Award - 2015 - Outstanding Public Affairs Program - LiveLine
- Anne Holliday wins PAB Award - 2016 - Outstanding Local Radio Newscast - ARG News Review
- Anne Holliday wins PAB Award - 2018 - Outstanding Local Radio Newscast - ARG News Review
- Igor wins 2 PAB 2012 Awards- Outstanding Local Radio Personality, Radio Promotional Announcement
- Scott Douglas/Frank Williams win PAB's 2011 Outstanding Local Radio Personality/Team for The Morning Buzz
- Igor wins PAB's 2009 Outstanding Promotional Announcement
- Frank Williams wins PAB's 2009 Outstanding Local Sports Announcer
- Igor wins PAB's 2010 Outstanding Promotional Announcement
- Frank Williams wins PAB's 2010 Outstanding Local Sports Announcer
- Igor wins PAB's 2011 Outstanding Radio Commercial
