= WLLW (FM) =

- Geneva, New York; United States
- Frequency: 101.7 MHz
- Branding: 101.7 The Wall

Programming
- Format: Classic rock

Ownership
- Owner: FLX Local Media

History
- First air date: 1981 (as WECQ-FM)
- Former call signs: WECQ-FM (1981–1993); WFLK (1993–2016)

Technical information
- Licensing authority: FCC
- Facility ID: 40804
- Class: A
- ERP: 5,400 watts
- HAAT: 38 meters
- Transmitter coordinates: 42°51′34″N 77°0′29″W

Links
- Public license information: Public file; LMS
- Webcast: Listen Live
- Website: WLLW Online

WLLW (101.7 FM) is a radio station broadcasting a classic rock format. Licensed to Geneva, New York, United States. The station is currently owned by FLX Local Media.

== History ==
The station went on the air as WECQ-FM on May 29, 1981, launching with a Top 40/CHR format under the branding CQ-102. Throughout the 1980s, it was an affiliate of American Top 40 with Casey Kasem, as well as the affiliate for Auburn Astros baseball. On June 3, 1993, the station changed its call sign and format to Country as WFLK, and on September 1, 2016, to the current WLLW.

On September 1, 2016, WFLK changed their call letters to WLLW and changed their format from country to classic rock, branded as "101.7 The Wall". The WLLW calls and classic rock format moved from 99.3 FM Seneca Falls, NY, which switched to classic hits under the WFLK calls. The current morning show consists of Ken Paradise & Woody Woodruff from 6 to 9 am.

== Previous logo ==
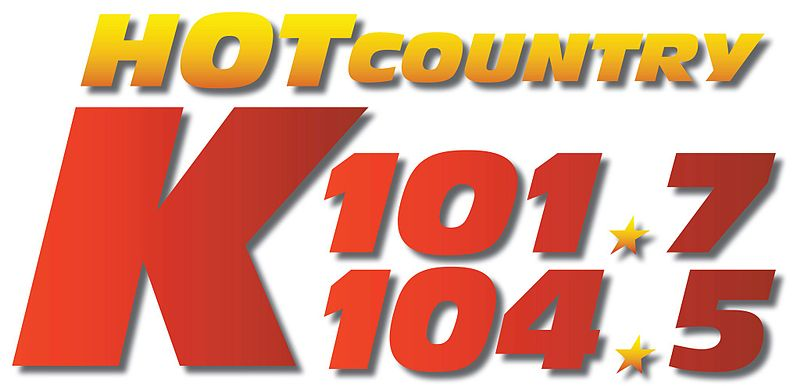
