= WFLK (FM) =

- Seneca Falls, New York; United States
- Broadcast area: Geneva-Auburn, New York
- Frequency: 99.3 MHz
- Branding: Classic Hits 99.3

Programming
- Format: Classic hits

Ownership
- Owner: Finger Lakes Radio Group
- Sister stations: WNYR-FM, WFLR, WGVA, WCGR, WAUB

History
- First air date: 1968 (as WSFW-FM)
- Former call signs: WSFW-FM (1968–2000); WLLW (2000–2016)

Technical information
- Licensing authority: FCC
- Facility ID: 5392
- Class: A
- ERP: 5,000 watts
- HAAT: 109 meters
- Transmitter coordinates: 42.994°N 76.866°W
- Translator: 98.1 K251AJ (Melrose Park)

Links
- Public license information: Public file; LMS
- Webcast: Listen Live
- Website: fingerlakesdailynews.com

WFLK (99.3 MHz) is a classic hits music formatted FM radio station licensed to Seneca Falls, New York and broadcasting to the Finger Lakes.

On September 1, 2016, WLLW and its classic rock format moved to 101.7 FM Geneva, New York, replacing country-formatted WFLK. The 99.3 FM frequency picked up the WFLK calls and switched to a classic hits format, branded as "Classic Hits 99.3" at 5p.m. on September 2.

== Former WLLW Programming ==
- The Bob and Tom Show
- Ken Paradise
- Jeff Michaels
- In the Studio (radio show)
- The House Of Hair
- Floydian Slip.

== Previous logos ==
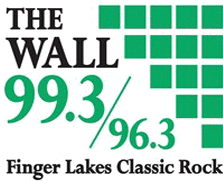
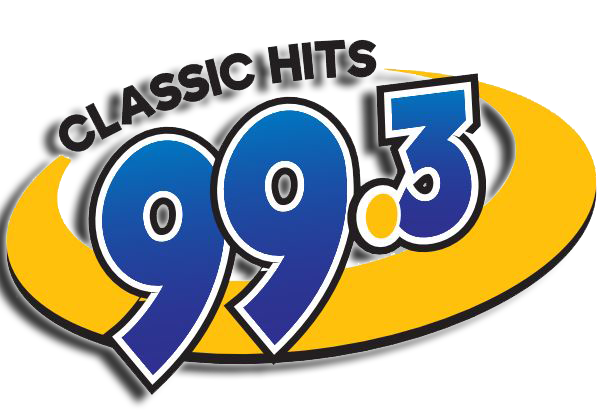
