= Stan Barron =

Former American sports broadcaster

- Born: January 21, 1921; New York City, US
- Died: November 27, 1984 (aged 63); Buffalo, New York, US
- Years active: 1954–1984
- Known for: Sports broadcaster

Stan Barron (January 21, 1921 – November 27, 1984) was an American sports broadcaster.

Barron, a native of New York City, and having previously worked in Joplin, Missouri, is best known for his work in Buffalo, New York, where he spent 32 years of his career, from 1952 until his death. He joined the staff of WKBW-AM 1520 in 1952, when the station was still a full-service network station, and was part of the inaugural on-air staff when WKBW launched a television station (channel 7) in 1958.

In 1965, Barron moved from WKBW to WBEN Radio and TV (mostly for AM 930 but also occasionally channel 4), trading places with Tom Jolls, who coincidentally went from WBEN to WKBW at the same time. At WBEN, Barron hosted the AM station's evening sports talk show "Free Form Sports" as part of the Stan Barron show and was the color commentator (with Van Miller doing play-by-play) for the Buffalo Bills. In addition, Barron held lead play-by-play duties for University of Buffalo Bulls football, Niagara University men's basketball, Canisius Golden Griffins men's basketball, AHL Buffalo Bisons hockey, and Buffalo Bisons baseball at various points in his career. Barron, a major baseball fan, helped orchestrate the return of the baseball Bisons to Buffalo in 1979.

Barron died at the end of November 1984 after a battle with thyroid cancer. He had been forced to retire after the Bills preseason because of his illness.

For his efforts, Barron is a member of the Greater Buffalo Sports Hall of Fame and the Buffalo Broadcasters Association Hall of Fame.
