= Rocketship 7 =

American children's television series (1962–78; 1992–93)

- Early promotional image showing (left to right) Mr. Beeper (later Biff Beeper), Promo the Robot, and Dave Thomas
- Also known as: Space Station
- Genre: Educational

Production
- Camera setup: Multi-Camera
- Running time: 39-41 minutes
- Production company: WTLA-TV

Original release
- Network: ABC
- Release: January 1, 1977 – December 31, 1993

Rocketship 7 was a children's television series that aired weekday mornings on WKBW-TV in Buffalo, New York from 1962 to 1978 and from 1992 to 1993. Rocketship 7 was created to promote the work of Bell Aerospace, an aircraft manufacturer in Wheatfield, and featured a Space Age theme popular at the time and an explicitly educational format, decades before it was made mandatory. The host of the show was Dave Thomas, who had joined WKBW in 1961. Promo the Robot was the show's other main on-air character. Rocketship 7 featured segments with Thomas and Promo along with cartoons and other short programs such as Davey and Goliath, and Gumby. Parents could write in and have their children's birthdays announced "on air", and could even ask Thomas to have the child look behind a chair or some other location to find their birthday present. Thomas left the station in 1978 to join WPVI in Philadelphia, where he assumed the name "Dave Roberts" (He remained at WPVI until his retirement in 2009). When Roberts left, WKBW canceled Rocketship 7.

Rocketship 7 shared some similarities with the Commander Tom Show, a show hosted by Tom Jolls; the two shows bookended WKBW's daytime schedule. The two series never crossed over, due to Thomas and Jolls working different shifts. Commander Tom was also never explicitly identified as the commander of a spaceship.

In 1992, Rocketship 7 was revived as a weekly Saturday morning series. Airing at 7 AM, Captain Mike Randall assumed hosting duties for this version of the show with his sidekick, Yeoman Bob (Stilson), with Randall's wife, his youngest son, a freshly repainted Promo the Robot and Captain Comic (Tim Warchocki) making guest appearances. Jolls, whose Commander Tom's World had ended its run a year prior, made his first and only cameos on Rocketship 7 during this time. Stilson served as the creator of the 1992 version of the series.

Bob would always open the show with "Yo!" Cartoons aired included Super Chicken and George of the Jungle. Recurring feature on the 1992 series included "Crummy Cartoon Theater 2000," a parody of Mystery Science Theater 3000 where Randall and Stilson would riff on public domain cartoon shorts, and "Are You Kidding?", where children would tell riddles and jokes). To keep with the "Rocketship" theme, the station used the term "Planet Earth" as part of the station's mailing address for feedback and contests.

Rocketship 7 was cancelled for good in 1993, as infomercials, public affairs, and educational/informational programming began to dominate the Saturday morning lineup. It was effectively replaced in WKBW's lineup by the late-night hosted movie series Off Beat Cinema.

Former WKBW-TV Graphic Designer and 3D animator Tim Warchocki (who played Captain Comic) is responsible for Promo the Robot's updated fluorescent green and yellow paint job. Prior to the 1992 version of Rocketship 7 Tim was asked to update the robot's look to fit color television and modern design. The original body, designed when the show was still in black and white, was gray and (on color episodes) red.

Rocketship 7 is mentioned in "The X in the File", an episode of the Fox television series Bones. In the episode, Agent Booth is excited to see a photo from the show, and claims he watched it regularly as a child. Booth is played by David Boreanaz, son of Dave Thomas.
