= WERS =

Adult album alternative radio station at Emerson College

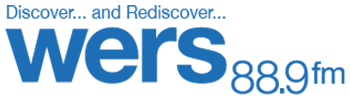
- Boston, Massachusetts; United States
- Broadcast area: Greater Boston
- Frequency: 88.9 MHz (HD Radio)
- Branding: 88.9 WERS

Programming
- Format: Eclectic; adult album alternative
- Subchannels: HD2: WERS Plus (hip hop/R&B)

History
- First air date: November 14, 1949
- Former frequencies: 88.1 MHz (1949–1950)

Technical information
- Licensing authority: FCC
- Facility ID: 19482
- Class: B1
- ERP: 4,000 watts
- HAAT: 186 meters (610 ft)
- Transmitter coordinates: 42°21′8.4″N 71°3′23.2″W
- Translator: See § Translators

Links
- Public license information: Public file; LMS
- Webcast: Listen live HD2: Listen live
- Website: wers.org HD2: wersplus.org

WERS (88.9 FM) is one of Emerson College's two radio stations (the other being campus station WECB), located in Boston, Massachusetts, United States. Programming features over 20 different styles of music and news, including live performances and interviews. WERS stands as the oldest non-commercial radio station in New England, and has been in operation since November 1949.

== Leadership ==
Among the founders of the station was WEEI program director Arthur F. Edes, who first taught broadcasting courses at Emerson in 1932 and helped to plan a campus radio station. The chief architect of WERS in its early years was Professor Charles William Dudley. As of 2026, Emerson College alum Howard Simpson acts as General Manager.

== Translators ==
Broadcast translators for WERS
Call sign	Frequency	City of license	FID	ERP (W)	HAAT	Class	Transmitter coordinates	FCC info
W268AM	101.5 FM	Gloucester, Massachusetts	138772	38	71.1 m (233 ft)	D	42°37′28.3″N 70°39′13.2″W	LMS
W243BG	96.5 FM	New Bedford, Massachusetts	142088	55	53.1 m (174 ft)	D	41°38′25.4″N 70°55′1.1″W	LMS

In June 2007, WERS inaugurated a translator station on 96.5 MHz in New Bedford, Massachusetts, relaying WERS's programming to New Bedford and nearby communities. Another translator, on 101.5 MHz in Gloucester, Massachusetts, on Cape Ann, went on the air in July 2008.

== Sports ==
In the late 1990s and mid-2000s, WERS featured a successful sports-themed program, Sports Sunday, which aired Sundays from noon to 2 pm. The program won three consecutive Associated Press annual awards for student sports programming (2002, 2003, and 2004). Guests of the show included former basketball great Bill Walton, Boston Globe columnist Kevin Paul DuPont, Hockey East commissioner Joe Bertagna, former Northeastern University men’s hockey head coach Bruce Crowder, InsideHockey.com columnist James Murphy, and NHL.com columnist Bob Snow.

Former show hosts include Lon Nichols (current anchor for KLKN in Lincoln, Nebraska), Lowell Galindo (current ESPNU anchor), Tom Gauthier (current radio broadcaster and director of media relations for the Bowling Green Hot Rods), Justin Termine (current anchor and producer for NBA Radio on Sirius), Mike Gastonguay (interned as an associate producer for KXTA’s Loose Cannons), Matt Porter (Palm Beach Post Miami Hurricanes beat reporter), Steve Crowe (Boston Globe part-timer) and Ryan Heisler (noted triathlete).

== See also ==
- Campus radio
- List of college radio stations in the United States
