= Tom Jolls =

American weatherman and children's television host (1933–2023)

- Still image from the Commander Tom Show, c. 1965
- Born: August 16, 1933; Newfane, New York, U.S.
- Died: June 7, 2023 (aged 89); Cheektowaga, New York, U.S.
- Occupation: Television personality
- Spouse: Janice Jolls
- Children: 6

Tom Jolls (August 6, 1933 – June 7, 2023) was an American television personality best known for his 34-year tenure at WKBW-TV in Buffalo, New York. At WKBW, Jolls hosted "The Weather Outside" segments during Eyewitness News, performed many of the station's voiceovers, and served as host of the children's television show, the Commander Tom Show.

== Biography ==
Tom Jolls was born in Newfane, New York, and grew up in Lockport, New York, where he worked at WUSJ from 1951 to 1962. His first television experience came as a personality at the short-lived WBES-TV during its three months in operation in 1953. He moved to Buffalo, working for WBEN (AM)/TV, and in 1965 was effectively traded to WKBW-TV in exchange for Stan Barron. At WKBW, Jolls became the station's evening news weatherman, and before the end of the year, he was also hosting The Superman Show—interstitial segments. These featured Jolls as Captain Tom, later Commander Tom, which aired around broadcasts of Adventures of Superman. The program evolved into The Commander Tom Show and would be on the air in various formats for 26 years.

Jolls, along with news anchor Irv Weinstein and sports anchor Rick Azar, was a nighttime fixture on WKBW. As host of "The Weather Outside," Jolls would stand out in the elements to report on weather conditions, and seeing him shivering or struggling to keep balance in gusty winds became common. Another one of Jolls's trademarks was his "Weather Word," a summation of the weather forecast in one word (a particular favorite of Jolls was salubrious, for beautiful weather), as well as ending his temperature listing by reminding us that it was "...and cooler by the lake!" He also maintained a weather stick as a forecasting aid; it was eventually broken apart by vandals. He had a more laid-back, conversational style to his forecast presentation, contrasted to the hipper, younger approach taken by channel 4's Kevin O'Connell and the manic comedy of channel 2's Barry Lillis.

Jolls never earned any certification in meteorology; he believed that the art of weather forecasting was simple enough that it did not require advanced meteorological training. In attempting to convince Mike Randall, then a feature reporter, to get into weather forecasting, Jolls said "Weather is so easy, High pressure is nice weather, low pressure is bad weather." He also maintained a subscription to AccuWeather and membership in the American Meteorological Society from 1969 onward. He had largely avoided the Great Lakes Blizzard of 1977 since he went home before the worst of the blizzard hit. Jolls noted that the blizzard marked a turning point in weather forecasting on television, as he had been given a much larger, earlier spot in the newscasts after the event since weather had become a much greater priority. After the Blizzard, when Jolls returned, he jokingly delivered the forecast from a lounge chair in front of a campfire.

In 1992, Jolls reprised his Commander Tom character in a recurring role on the weekend morning kids' show Rocketship 7. It was cancelled after one year.

Azar retired in 1989, ending the 24-year run of the anchor team of Weinstein-Jolls-Azar. Weinstein retired in 1998, and Jolls left the air six months later, retiring on June 30, 1999. Mike Randall was named as his successor. Jolls and his wife had 6 children: Suzanne Marie, Thomas Dale, Kathleen Ann, Lisa Ann, Timothy Wilbert and Terrence Leo.

At the time of his death, he was living in his hometown of Newfane. He had spent his winters in Cape Coral, Florida, before deciding to remain in Western New York to be with his family, which included his wife Janice, six children, 17 grandchildren and 12 great-grandchildren.

Jolls, Weinstein, and Azar were all inducted into the Buffalo Broadcasting Hall of Fame in 1998. Jolls was also inducted into the New York State Broadcasters Association Hall of Fame in 2019.

Jolls died at his New York home on June 7, 2023, at the age of 89.

== External links and sources ==
- The Irv, Rick, and Tom Page Fan site by Buffalonian Steve Cichon
