= Irv Weinstein =

Buffalo television news journalist

- Irv Weinstein in 1973
- Born: Irwin B. Weinstein; April 29, 1930; Rochester, New York, US
- Died: December 26, 2017 (aged 87); Mission Viejo, California, US
- Occupations: Broadcaster, television news anchor
- Years active: 1945–1998
- Notable credit: WKBW Eyewitness News
- Spouse: Elaine Weinstein
- Children: Beth Krom, Marc Weinstein, Rachel Lloyd

Irwin B. "Irv" Weinstein (April 29, 1930 – December 26, 2017) was an American local television news anchor and occasional radio actor. He hosted WKBW-TV's Eyewitness News in Buffalo, New York, for 34 years, from 1964 to 1998, becoming an iconic broadcaster well known in both the Buffalo area and in Southern Ontario, which was within WKBW's broadcast area. Weinstein was known for his powerful delivery and sense of humor. Weinstein, weatherman Tom Jolls and sports anchor Rick Azar fronted the broadcast from 1965 until Azar's retirement in 1989. Weinstein was inducted into the Buffalo Broadcasters Hall of Fame in 1998 and the N.Y. State Broadcasters Association in 2006.

== Life and career ==
Born in Rochester, New York, to Lithuanian Jewish parents, Weinstein began his broadcast career while he was in high school, working at WHAM Radio as an actor on several locally produced programs under the tutelage of Bill Hanrahan. He was paid $7 a day for his work on WHAM, in which Weinstein, whose voice was already mature by the age of 15, would often play the roles of adults. Weinstein's work on WHAM eventually led to a single national radio appearance, as a one-scene character on The Aldrich Family, for which he was paid $230, an unusually high sum for the day. He initially hoped to pursue an acting career, but a conversation with Robert Mitchum, who warned Weinstein of a shortage of opportunities in the entertainment industry, convinced Weinstein to attend broadcasting school in New York City instead.

After sending out hundreds of resumes and barely getting any responses, he began his professional career at KWWL-TV in Waterloo, Iowa (which lasted only a few months) and various stations in West Virginia, in-between working low-end jobs and nearly giving up before his wife convinced him not to accept a job with the United States Postal Service. In West Virginia, he took the pseudonym "Mark Roberts" and was influenced by the styles of Paul Harvey. He was hired as a newscaster at WKBW Radio in Buffalo in 1958, a role he chose to be closer to his hometown; initially working under Art Wander, Weinstein eventually became news director. His fast-paced style featured strong writing and alliteration ("pistol-packing punks" referring to petty criminals, or "Buffalo blaze busters" in place of firefighters), and it was here where he began referring to himself as "Irv."

In 1964, Weinstein was hired as news director and anchorman at sister station WKBW-TV, an ABC Network affiliate. At the time, the station's news programs were rated #3 in a three-station market. By 1974, WKBW-TV's Eyewitness News program had an audience larger than the combined audience of the two competing Buffalo stations. It remained the top-rated newscast until Weinstein's retirement in 1998 and beyond. Weinstein's innovations would later be adapted by Mel Kampmann for the national "Action News" franchise.

In 1968, Weinstein briefly returned to his broadcast beginnings as an actor in WKBW radio's Halloween adaptation of Orson Welles' War of the Worlds. Weinstein also appeared in a 1971 remake, which was re-run in 1998. During his 40-year career in Buffalo, Weinstein appeared in numerous stage productions and, in the early 1980s, co-owned The Playhouse, a legit theater in downtown Buffalo.

A WKBW-TV promo for Eyewitness News included a jingle:

"Irv Weinstein, you're really a pro!
Ya got all the news that we wanna know.
You tell it like it is and never throw us a curve,
Nobody says it like Ir-r-r-r-v !
Eye-wit-ness News (Yes-sah!)"

In 1991, Weinstein was caught in a hot mic moment when he critiqued, often harshly, the talent on the station, which was inadvertently made public.

The day of his retirement, December 31, 1998, was proclaimed "Irv Weinstein Day in Erie County" by then-Erie County Executive Dennis Gorski. Five days later, Toronto columnist David Frum wrote a tribute titled "He came from Buffalo" in Canada's National Post newspaper, writing, "The way the French feel about Jerry Lewis, that's how we feel about Irv Weinstein". In October 2004, Weinstein's status as "an icon of television journalism in Buffalo" was discussed on the floor of the Ontario Legislature by MPP Tim Hudak. Weinstein was considered a quintessential part of Buffalo culture during his time with WKBW and beyond. At the time of his retirement, his 33-year tenure with WKBW was the longest for any news anchor with a single television station in Buffalo, a record that would stand until 2017 when Jacquie Walker of WIVB-TV surpassed Weinstein.

Weinstein, who shifted away from the sensationalist approach toward the end of his career, explained that the reason he reported on arson so much compared to, for example, Toronto, was a practical one: Toronto had most of its wood structures burnt down in the 1904 Great Fire of Toronto, while Buffalo still had a large stock of wood-frame houses, and thus there were indeed more fires in Buffalo than in Toronto.

Weinstein was known for using alliteration in his reporting. Either he or WNEW-TV's Mel Epstein coined the phrase "It's 11:00. Do you know where your children are?," a public service announcement now used on numerous other U.S. stations. The phrase "topping tonight's Eyewitness News" continues to be used to open WKBW's newscasts to the present day.

== References in popular culture ==
- Eugene Levy's "Earl Camembert" character on SCTV drew inspiration from Weinstein.
- Producer Brad Grey and comedian Mike Myers cited Weinstein as influences.
- Actor Jim Carrey's character in Bruce Almighty, Bruce Nolan, is reported to be partially based on a real-life WKBW-TV reporter who wanted to replace the retiring Weinstein in 1999 but didn't get the job, and partly on real-life feature reporter Don Polec, who handled lighter and humorous features on WKBW during the 1970s.
- The Buffalo-based comedy rock band Green Jellö parodied Irv and Jolls (as Irv Weinsteingate and Tom Jooles respectively) in the video "Flight of the Skajaquada" from 1992's Cereal Killer.
- In the film Airplane II: The Sequel, as TV news stations around the world report on an imminent plane crash, a Buffalo newscaster (played by Pat Sajak) is reporting a local arson. This was an homage to Weinstein, who was known for covering Buffalo's many arson-induced fires.
- In the early 1990s, the Buffalo Bisons would flash Weinstein's face on their scoreboard during the seventh inning stretch in time to the song "Rock and Roll Pt. 2" by Gary Glitter. The chorus of "Hey!" was replaced with "Irv!".

== Personal life ==
Weinstein and his wife Elaine spent most of their retirement in Irvine, California; they also maintained a second home in Ellicottville, New York until a few years before he died. Irv and Elaine Weinstein were married from 1955 until his death. Their daughter, Beth Krom, served sixteen years on the Irvine City Council, including two terms as mayor. The Weinsteins' son, Marc, is co-owner of Amoeba Music, and their younger daughter, Rachel Lloyd, is an artist and theater administrator in the Pittsburgh area.

In summer 2016, Weinstein was diagnosed with amyotrophic lateral sclerosis, after first experiencing symptoms of the disease in March. With the diagnosis, Weinstein relocated to an assisted living facility in Mission Viejo, California, where he would spend the end of his life. As of November 2016, he could no longer walk but still had full function of his arms and torso and was in good mental condition; he was given a prognosis of five years to live and could still speak (with some audible difficulty as the disease also affected his breathing). By April 2017, Weinstein was no longer able to speak and communicated solely by typing. He died in Mission Viejo on December 26, 2017, aged 87, from complications of the disease.
