= Commander Tom Show =

American children's television series

- Presented by: Tom Jolls
- Country of origin: United States
- Original language: English

Original release
- Network: WKBW-TV
- Release: December 20, 1965 – 1993

The Commander Tom Show is a children's television series that aired weekday afternoons on Channel 7 WKBW-TV in Buffalo, New York, premiering on December 20, 1965.

The host of the show was Tom Jolls, who had joined WKBW as a weatherman earlier in 1965. Commander Tom had replaced The Jungle Jay Nelson Show, a jungle-themed program built around Tarzan films, which had aired in the early 1960s; Nelson was dissatisfied working in television and had used the popularity of his "Jungle Jay" persona in Canada to get work at CHUM, Toronto's preeminent pop music station at the time. When the show launched, it consisted of interstitial segments with Jolls shown around episodes of the Adventures of Superman, a TV series that ran from 1952 till 1958. Dustmop the puppet (a dog) was introduced in 1967. An alligator puppet, Matty the Mod followed, along with the first female puppet Cecily Fripple, modeled after the American comedian Phyllis Diller. A similar appearing puppet was Cecily's evil sister Cecile. Jolls used his own puppets for the program and continued to hold possession of the puppets until his death.

Exactly what Commander Tom was commanding was never made clear during the course of the show's run. The format was meant to evoke the virtues of superheroes, though Commander Tom never had any identifiable superpowers of his own. The show's set, built by the same set designer that had built Rocketship 7's studio, was comparatively barebones, featuring only a window for Jolls's puppets to converse with the commander. During each shows' respective original run, the two never crossed over, as Jolls and Rocketship 7 host Dave Thomas worked different shifts. Over time, while Rocketship 7 maintained an explicitly educational Space Age theme meant to promote the virtues of local business Bell Aerospace, Commander Tom eventually evolved into a more comforting, homely presence, akin to other puppet shows such as Mr. Dressup and Mister Rogers' Neighborhood.

In the early 1970s, Superman (whose rights had moved to the networks) would be replaced with other family and children's programming including re-runs of The Three Stooges, The Flintstones, Batman, Little Rascals, The Munsters, and The Addams Family. Many short animated cartoons also were shown: Warner Bros. Merrie Melodies and Looney Tunes were staples for many years, including some of the earliest Porky Pig and Bugs Bunny shorts from the 1930s. Hanna-Barbera cartoons such as Touché Turtle and Peter Potamus replaced Bugs and his friends after a time. A number of MGM cartoons from the 1930s were shown as well. Near the end of its run, the show was renamed Commander Tom's World and relegated to weekends. In later years, it played such shows as Davey and Goliath, Rainbow Brite, and The Getalong Gang.

After the show was cancelled in 1991, the "Commander Tom" character was merged into another show, a revival of Rocketship 7 in 1992. That, too, came to an end in 1993, and the character of "Commander Tom" had gone for good.

Tom would often travel from school to school to speak to young children. He was an annual event in the Holland Central School district's "Let's Give America a Chance" career day.

== Episode status ==
Jolls noted in 2019 that he held an archive of Commander Tom episodes that he showed to his great-grandchildren.
