= Off Beat Cinema =

American television series

- Genre: Horror / Science-fiction / Comedy / Cult / Foreign
- Created by: James Gillan
- Written by: James Gillan; Jeffrey Roberts
- Directed by: Andy Smyczynski; Albert Hoffman; Jamie Ray Conley; Gary S. Isbrandt
- Starring: Constance Caldwell; Tony Billoni; Jeffrey Roberts; Nia Marcolin
- Theme music composer: David Kane's Them Jazzbeards
- Opening theme: “Tequila Mockingbird”
- Composer: David Kane
- Country of origin: United States
- Original language: English
- No. of seasons: 32

Production
- Executive producer: John Di Sciullo
- Producers: James Gillan; Lou Rera
- Production locations: Buffalo, New York, USA
- Cinematography: Richard John Lee; Chatham Marcolini
- Editors: Joel Barone; Tim Marcolini; Andy Smyczynski
- Running time: 120 minutes

Original release
- Network: WKBW-TV (1993-2012); WBBZ-TV (2012-present); Retro Television Network (2000-present)
- Release: October 31, 1993 – present

Off Beat Cinema is a two-hour hosted movie show that airs on television stations throughout the United States in late-night time slots. It originated from WKBW-TV in Buffalo, New York from its launch on Sunday October 31, 1993 until July 2012. It shifted to local competitor WBBZ-TV on August 4, 2012.

Off Beat Cinema features a broad range of films described by the show's staff as "the Good, the Bad, the Foreign..." but mostly cult movies such as Night of the Living Dead, Santa Claus Conquers the Martians and even more art house fare such as The Third Man in a format not unlike the Creature Double Feature of the 1970s and 1980s. On occasion, a clip show will air featuring themed collections of short films and episodes of film serials and television shows (the annual Christmas special follows this format, with another example being the “Night of Superheroes” that included Flash Gordon and Commando Cody serials and the Fleischer Studios Superman shorts). As with most hosted movie programs of its kind, a large portion of Off Beat Cinema's film catalog consists of films that lapsed into the public domain.

== History ==
=== Creation ===
Off Beat Cinema was created by advertising executive James Gillan and is co-written by Gillan and creative consultant Jeffrey Roberts. It originally started airing in 1993 in the Buffalo/Toronto area on WKBW-TV. The first movie featured was the original "Night of the Living Dead," which has aired every Halloween weekend ever since. On the show's official site, Gillan states, "Off Beat Cinema was created to provide a forum for films that are not regularly shown on television – and in many cases – are not readily available, even on DVD. There is an enormous cache of films out there that an entire generation grew up watching that are otherwise unavailable. We wanted to create a program reminiscent of the hosted late night film shows of the 1960s and 1970s – the kind of show that made you beg your parents to let you stay up late to watch. Where else can you watch Teenagers from Outer Space and a week later watch Bergman’s The Seventh Seal in its original language version?"

The show's producer John Di Sciullo says on the official site that "Off Beat Cinema was originally a reaction to the insidious spread of infomercials and the void of late night television. The program really struck a chord with viewers." Off Beat Cinema has its own slate of advertisers, usually targeting alternative crowds. Poster Art, Terrapin Station (a Grateful Dead inspired head shop in Buffalo, named after the album of the same name), and Mighty Taco, among many other area restaurants, are among the show's numerous sponsors.

The series began originating on WBBZ-TV starting August 4, 2012 airing Saturday night at Midnight. John Di Sciullo moved to that station as executive director of production and promotion. The series is produced in WBBZ's studio at the Eastern Hills Mall in Clarence, which includes (for the first time in the series' history) several live studio audience recordings. (The live audiences ended by 2024, when the Eastern Hills Mall closed its concourse and forced WBBZ to use a back entrance to continue accessing its own studios.) The series also began adding more well-received "classic" films into its rotation after the move to WBBZ, a move that helps contrast the series from the strictly B-movie and Z-movie films that Svengoolie and other midnight-movie series regularly feature.

On January 26, 2013, the show transitioned to high-definition television. The first film to be featured in HD was Hangar 18. Beginning in 2015, the show began filming select interstitials on location.

=== Hosts and special guests ===
Hosts

- "Airborne" Eddy Dobosiewicz as Maxwell Truth (1993–2015)
- Matthew Bauer as Oscar Wild (1993–1995)
- Liz Honig as Zeena (1993–1994 as a regular, with very occasional later appearances though mid-1995)
- Loraine O'Donnell as Luna (1994–1995)
- Anthony Billoni as Bird (1995–present; occasional appearances previously)
- Constance McEwen Caldwell as Zelda (1995–present; Older segments in rotation as of 2024 - limited filmed appearances since late 2023.)
- Jeffrey Roberts as Theodore (2016–present)
- Nia Marcolin as Spectra (2024–present, appearing in newly filmed segments, filling in for "Zelda".)
- Allie Brady as Lana (2025–present, appearing in newly filmed segments)

The series is usually hosted by a trio of beatnik characters who humorously discuss the movies on the show, whilst ingesting significant amounts of coffee at the Hungry Ear Coffeehouse. The specific members of the trio have changed over time, and as well, numerous episodes (especially from 2015/16) feature only a duo hosting. Also, relatively recently, the host trio has been expanded into a quartet.

The show's original trio of hosts were led by the witty and irreverent "Maxwell Truth" ("Airborne" Eddy Dobosiewicz), high-energy bearded "Oscar Wild" (Matthew Bauer), and spacey-but-friendly chick "Zeena" (Liz Honig). Others were also seen in the coffeehouse, usually as extras. Occasionally, an odd aspiring poet named "Bird" was featured as a recurring player.

Zeena was seen less frequently after the first year or so, often being replaced by a few rotating female characters, most frequently Loraine O'Donnell as "Luna". Bauer left the show in 1995, and the character of Oscar was replaced by the pseudo-profound beatnik artist and would-be philosopher "Bird" (Anthony Billoni, who by day serves as an anti-tobacco lobbyist). Shortly thereafter, the third host slot was permanently filled by "Zelda" (Stage and Film Actress Constance Caldwell), who was quite friendly with the boys, but also enjoyed deflating their pretensions with a well-timed barb.

The trio of Maxwell, Zelda and Bird remained as hosts for the next 20 years. Each week they were often joined by guest stars like Emo Philips, Lauren Bacall, Pete Best of "The Beatles," and Keanu Reeves, and music acts like the Barenaked Ladies, the Tragically Hip, and Charming Disaster.

In April 2015, Off Beat Cinema and Dobosciewicz parted ways when the station suspended him for a controversial tweet. For about the next year or so, Bird and Zelda hosted the program as a duo. Beginning in March 2016, the third host position was intermittently filled by "Theodore," played by Jeffrey Roberts and described as a "cinematic theologian." (He became permanent third host by June,)

Beginning in 2023, the character of Zelda was seen only very occasionally, though actress Caldwell did not leave the show entirely. In 2024, the group introduced "The Mysterious Spectra," a mystic who fills in for Zelda when Caldwell is unavailable and is portrayed by Nia Marcolin. A fourth character, Lana, began making occasional appearances in 2025, portrayed by Allie Brady.

Interstitial segments are shot in black and white. Interstitial music on Off Beat Cinema is provided by David Kane's Them Jazzbeards and is typically fusion in style.

=== Syndication ===
Off Beat Cinema can also be seen nationwide Saturday nights at 10pm Eastern/Pacific on many Retro TV affiliates while also streamed at that time on the Retro website, www.getafteritmedia.com. The show also airs on the Vision Communications stations (WYDC Corning, WJKP-MyTV Corning, and WBGT-CD Rochester), Deerfield Media's flagship station TV8 in Vail, Colorado, SGTN in Atlanta, Georgia and Beaumont, Texas, and many other stations. Due to the shift of the originating station to WBBZ-TV, it is no longer seen on cable television in Canada, as that station is not authorized for carriage in that country; the station can be seen in most parts of the Niagara Region via antenna, either through WBBZ or through Retro affiliate WBNF-LD.

=== Home video releases ===
A one-disc "The Best of Off Beat Cinema" DVD was released by a local distributor in 2003. Due to the time limits of the medium, only clips of the featured films were presented, along with a large selection of studio segments. Select episodes have also been released on YouTube.

=== Spin-off ===
In 2024, WBBZ announced that the show would produce a limited-run series spin-off, Jazz Scene Buffalo, featuring jazz musicians performing at the Hungry Ear Coffeehouse. The three episodes were edited together as a special episode of Off Beat Cinema on the syndication network. A fourth episode was produced in mid-2024.
