= Brenda Brenon =

American journalist

Brenda Brenon is a former sportscaster. She was the first woman to be included on an NHL broadcast team on network television.

== Early life ==
Brenon grew up in the suburbs outside of Buffalo, New York. She was the youngest of ten children. She graduated from high school in three years and from Buffalo State College in three as well.

== Career ==
=== Buffalo ===
In 1985, she was hired by WKBW-TV sports director Rick Azar as a part-time sports producer. She later moved into an on-camera role, reporting on the Buffalo Sabres. During her tenure at Channel 7, Brenon was credited with breaking the story about Clint Malarchuk's obsessive–compulsive disorder.

=== National work ===
During the 1994 NHL All-Star Game in New York City, Brenon was the intermission host and rinkside reporter for NBC Sports. This was the first time a female was involved in an on-air role during NHL broadcast in North America. She continued in the role for ABC Sports during the '94 NHL playoffs, while also working as a rinkside reporter for ESPN'S NHL broadcasts.

=== Boston ===
Brenon married The Boston Globe hockey writer Kevin Dupont in August 1994. She resigned from Channel 7 shortly thereafter to move to Boston with her husband.

In 1995, Brenon began writing for The Boston Globe. She was also hired to serve as one of six rotating anchors for NewSport's Scoreboard Central.

In September 1995, she was hired by NESN to host the network's Boston Bruins telecasts. She would also do feature pieces for its Front Row program. On July 31, 1997, NESN eliminated the role of rinkside reporter and Brenon was dismissed. However, she returned to her job in September after the United States Department of Labor ordered the network to rehire her with back pay under the Family and Medical Leave Act of 1993, which provides job protection during maternity. Brenon did not return for the 1998–99 Bruins season, as her position of between-periods reporter was eliminated.
