= WKBW-TV =

Television station in Buffalo, New York

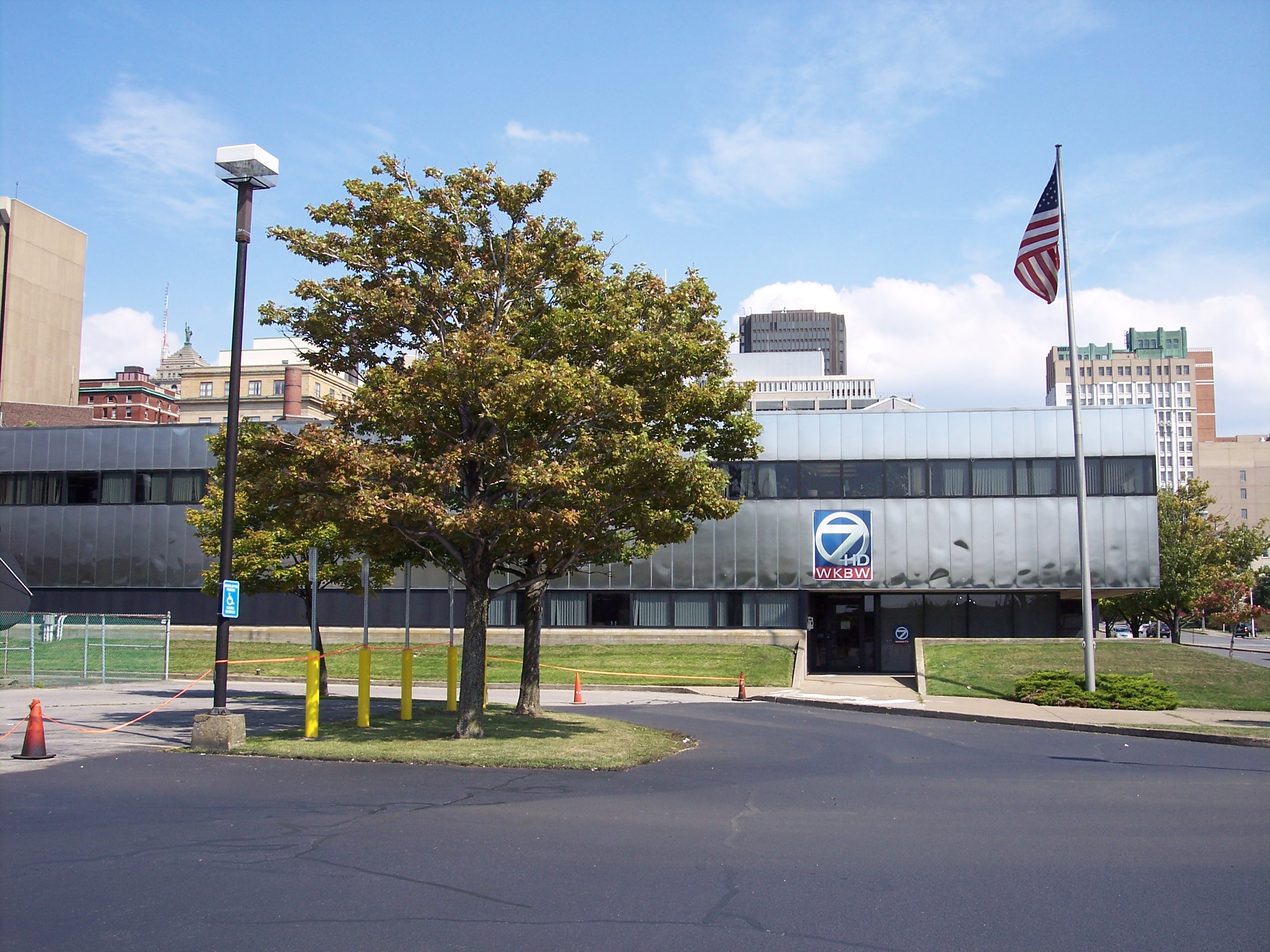
- WKBW-TV's studio and office facility in downtown Buffalo.
- Buffalo, New York; United States
- Channels: Digital: 34 (UHF); Virtual: 7
- Branding: 7ABC; 7 News

Programming
- Affiliations: 7.1: ABC; for others, see § Subchannels

Ownership
- Owner: E. W. Scripps Company; (Scripps Broadcasting Holdings LLC)

History
- First air date: November 30, 1958
- Former channel numbers: Analog: 7 (VHF, 1958–2009); Digital: 38 (UHF, until 2020)
- Call sign meaning: Adopted as sister station to randomly assigned sequential call letters of WKBW (AM). Later backronyms included "Well Known Bible Witness" and "We Know Buffalo's Watching".

Technical information
- Licensing authority: FCC
- Facility ID: 54176
- ERP: 660 kW
- HAAT: 432 m (1,417 ft)
- Transmitter coordinates: 42°38′15″N 78°37′11″W

Links
- Public license information: Public file; LMS
- Website: www.wkbw.com

WKBW-TV (channel 7) is a television station in Buffalo, New York, United States, affiliated with ABC. Owned by the E. W. Scripps Company, the station maintains studios at 7 Broadcast Plaza in downtown Buffalo and a transmitter on Center Street in Colden.

WKBW-TV is one of a number of local Buffalo television stations that are available over-the-air and on cable television in Canada, particularly in Southern Ontario. For years, it was carried via microwave to cable systems in such areas as Corning and Horseheads; this ended when WENY-TV signed on as the ABC affiliate for the Elmira market.

== History ==
=== Clinton Churchill/CapCities ownership (1957–1986) ===
The Channel 7 frequency was hotly contested during the 1950s; the Buffalo Courier-Express and former WBUF-TV owner Sherwin Grossman tried several times to gain rights to the channel allocation (to compete with The Buffalo News's WBEN-TV), but was unable to secure a license. The competition for the channel 7 allocation continued to grow when the city's first UHF station, WBES-TV, failed. Clinton Churchill, original owner of 50,000 watt radio station WKBW (1520 AM, now WWKB), was granted the license to operate the station in 1957. He beat out, among other competitors, the owners of WWOL, an entity known as "Great Lakes Television," and, informally, Bernard Obletz, who already owned the former WBES-TV license but was convinced by this point that UHF could not compete with VHF. WKBW-TV was originally intended to be an independent station. However, after WBUF was shut down by its second owner, NBC, on September 30, 1958, then-ABC affiliate WGR-TV (channel 2, now WGRZ) re-added NBC programs. As a result of the network shuffle, WKBW-TV premiered as ABC's new Buffalo affiliate when it went on the air on November 30, 1958. The station's studios were originally located at 1420 Main Street in the former Churchill Tabernacle Church, with WKBW radio located next door at 1430 Main Street.

Churchill sold the WKBW stations to Capital Cities Broadcasting (which later became Capital Cities Communications) in 1961, earning a handsome return on his original investment into WKBW radio in 1926. CapCities would serve as WKBW-TV's longest-tenured owner, owning it and its radio sister for 25 years, and the station would reach its peak during Capital Cities' ownership. WKBW-TV produced iconic children's programing such as Rocketship 7 and The Commander Tom Show from the 1960s to the 1980s. A staple of its morning programming for multiple years was Dialing for Dollars, which later became AM Buffalo after the Dialing for Dollars franchise was discontinued; AM Buffalo continued to air on WKBW-TV until June 23, 2023. Under Capital Cities' ownership, in 1978 the WKBW stations moved their studios from Main Street to their present location, "7 Broadcast Plaza", on Church Street a few blocks southwest of Niagara Square.

In 1977, WKBW-TV unsuccessfully sued the Canadian Radio-Television Commission (CRTC) over simultaneous substitution rules. In Capital Cities Communications Inc v Canadian Radio-Television Commission, WKBW-TV argued that the CRTC did not have jurisdiction to enforce simultaneous substitution if the stations simulcasting an American program did not broadcast across a provincial line (in WKBW's case, the stations in question were in Toronto and Hamilton, both of which were primarily carried only in the province of Ontario). The Supreme Court of Canada ruled in the CRTC's favor, declaring broadcasting to be a federal undertaking under Canadian law, and that whether the station broadcast across a provincial line was irrelevant to that fact.

=== Queen City Broadcasting/Granite Broadcasting Co. years (1986–2014) ===
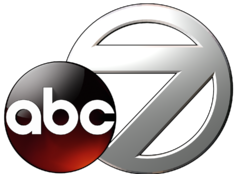
Granite Broadcasting's version of the Circle 7 logo, used on WKBW from 2003 to 2014.

When Capital Cities announced its acquisition of ABC in March 1985, it was required to divest stations to stay within Federal Communications Commission (FCC) ownership limits of the era. The company announced the sale of WKBW-TV to J. Bruce Llewelyn's Queen City Broadcasting in August of that year; the sale of the station would be completed in early 1986, shortly after Capital Cities completed its acquisition of ABC. At that point, WKBW radio was sold to Price Communications and had its call letters changed to WWKB (that station is currently owned by Audacy). In late 1993, Granite Broadcasting acquired a 45% minority stake in WKBW-TV from Queen City Broadcasting. A year-and-a-half later, in June 1995, Granite bought the remaining 55% interest in the station.

Until 2000, New York Lottery drawings were shown on WKBW-TV (these have since moved to WGRZ and were discontinued in October 2013; they have since been reinstated). WKBW-TV, through at least the early 2000s, operated the Niagara Frontier radio reading service on its second audio program feed, though it was pulled after the Super Bowl XXXVIII halftime show controversy in 2004 due to content concerns and the FCC's stricter enforcement of obscenity laws, which included some RRS titles. WNED-FM's subcarrier then was contracted to carry the service from then on.

From 2006 to April 2009, WKBW-TV operated WNGS, owned at the time by Equity Media Holdings, under a local marketing agreement for most of that time while channel 67 was affiliated with the then-Equity-owned Retro Television Network. Equity went bankrupt in 2009, selling off RTN to company shareholder Henry Luken's Luken Communications by January 2009 (which led to WNGS and other Equity stations dropping the network) and the Equity stations being liquidated, with WNGS sold to the Daystar Television Network in April 2009 (the station has since been resold to a local group run by Philip A. Arno). As a result of the changes, WKBW-TV ended the LMA with WNGS which has since changed its call to WBBZ-TV.

=== The Scripps era (2014–present) ===
WKBW Circle 7 logo, used from September 2014 to December 2021.

On February 10, 2014, the E. W. Scripps Company announced that it would acquire WKBW-TV as well as MyNetworkTV affiliate WMYD in Detroit from Granite Broadcasting for $110 million. The FCC approved the sale on May 2. The sale was completed on June 16. The completion of the purchase resulted in WKBW-TV becoming Scripps' first station in the state of New York. With Scripps' acquisition of WKBW-TV, each of Buffalo's "Big Three" network affiliates have at one point or another been owned by a company with newspaper interests; WIVB-TV, founded in 1948 as WBEN-TV, was owned by the Butler family, then-owners of the Buffalo Evening News, from its inception until the early 1970s (and both had shared partial ownership by Warren Buffett's Berkshire Hathaway from 2014 to 2017, via BH's stake in Media General); Gannett Company, publishers of USA Today and various other newspapers around the country, acquired WGRZ-TV in 1996. E. W. Scripps spun-off their papers to Journal Media Group on April 1, 2015, while Gannett's broadcasting and digital media operations were spun off to the new Tegna on June 29, 2015.

On September 24, 2020, a consortium made up of Scripps and Berkshire Hathaway announced the proposed purchase of Ion Media, including its Ion Television owned-and-operated station in the Buffalo market, WPXJ-TV (channel 51). Scripps chose not to retain WPXJ as Buffalo has fewer than eight unique television station owners, not enough to permit a duopoly in any case. WPXJ was instead included in a package of stations resold to Inyo Broadcast Holdings.

On December 31, 2021, beginning with the 11 p.m. newscast, WKBW had its first major rebrand in 18 years. The station changed its logo to a new one that it had been using for its digital operations for the previous few months.

== Programming ==
Until recently, WKBW-TV signed off on Saturday and Sunday mornings for a half-hour from 4 to 4:30 a.m.; there was no station information, but the American and Canadian national anthems were played before and after the test pattern, like Sinclair-owned stations WUTV (channel 29) and WNYO-TV (channel 49), which continue to sign off on Monday mornings.

=== Past local programming ===
- AM Buffalo, the outgrowth of WKBW's version of Dialing for Dollars, was a talk show that by the 21st century consisted mostly of brokered segments with paid sponsors as "guests". A PM Buffalo version aired between 2004 and 2008. Longtime hosts included Liz Dribben, Nolan Johannes, Dave Roberts, Brian Kahle, Linda Pellegrino, Jon Summers, and Melanie Camp. On June 1, 2023, the Buffalo Broadcasters Association reported that WKBW-TV was cancelling the program after 59 years.
- Rocketship 7, a morning children's show hosted by weatherman Dave Thomas and "Promo the Robot" from 1962 until Thomas left the station for WPVI-TV in Philadelphia in 1978 (changing his on-air moniker to Dave Roberts in the process). Thomas also hosted Dialing for Dollars which became AM Buffalo in 1978. A revival aired from 1992 to 1993 immediately after Commander Tom was canceled; this version, effectively a retooled version of Commander Tom with new hosts, featured Commander Mike (Randall) and sidekick "Yeoman Bob", with guest appearances by Commander Tom.
- The Commander Tom Show was an afternoon children's show hosted by WKBW-TV weatherman Tom Jolls from 1965 until 1991 when budget cuts forced its cancellation. In its last decade, the show aired on weekends only.
- In Conversation was a program that aired in the 1960s and 1970s, in which Liz Dribben would interview celebrities on tour in Buffalo.
- Off Beat Cinema, a collection of offbeat B movies, was created at WKBW-TV in 1993; it ran on WKBW-TV in overnight Friday and/or Saturday time slots from 1993 to 2012, and was also syndicated to the Retro Television Network. The program moved to WBBZ-TV in August 2012.
- WKBW-TV aired an annual 12-hour Variety Kids telethon each March, with Mr. Food (until his 2012 death) and Clint Holmes co-hosting along with WKBW-TV's personalities. In 2020, the telethon moved to WGRZ and WBBZ-TV.
- Dyngus Day Diary was an annual special summarizing Buffalo's annual Dyngus Day parade. It was hosted by "Airborne Eddy" Dobosiewicz, a local comedian, historian, and on-again/off-again WKBW contributor.
- As part of a perpetual contract, WKBW was the local broadcast outlet for Monday Night Football games that feature the Buffalo Bills. In 2022, WKBW surrendered its rights and WGRZ acquired them. With Monday Night Football moving to a more extensive simulcast schedule with ESPN and ABC from 2023 onward, WKBW has indirectly regained rights to most Bills MNF appearances. WKBW was also the longtime home of Bills preseason games before the Bills signed a statewide agreement with WIVB owner Nexstar Media Group.
- Countdown to 19/20## (title changed each year to correspond with the coming year) was an annual tradition held on New Year's Eve. The multi-part broadcast covered, most notably, official coverage of the Buffalo Ball Drop (formerly the 97 Rock Ball Drop), billed as the second-largest New Year's Eve ball drop in the United States (behind only the more famous Times Square Ball); the event was televised in synchronized split screen alongside the national New Year's Rockin' Eve broadcast and has been carried by the station since 1988. Also covered by the broadcast were local First Night celebrations. For 2025, the local coverage was cut to a split screen of the Buffalo ball drop and subsequent fireworks, as New Year's Rockin' Eve aired in its entirety.

=== Internet initiatives ===
During the 1990s and through much of the 2000s, WKBW-TV was proactive in its ventures on the Internet. The station was among the first in Western New York to launch a website in the mid-1990s and was the first to offer RSS feeds and podcasts. WKBW-TV streamed its noon newscasts live online, one of the few major network affiliates to offer a video stream at the time (the feed was removed from the WKBW.com page in April 2007, but remained in operation through at least mid-2008; Scripps reactivated the stream in 2015). On demand video of newscasts is available. WKBW-TV redesigned its website in April 2007 using the YouNews TV platform for locally contributed viewers photos and videos. In December 2010, the station's webmaster was laid off. The station's website continued to be managed internally by Granite until October 2014, when a Scripps-run modern site designed for compatibility with both traditional PC and mobile tablet and smartphone platforms came online, along with the standard Scripps interface for the station's mobile/tablet apps.

=== Financial difficulties and cutbacks ===
WKBW-TV's then-owner Granite Broadcasting filed for bankruptcy in 2006; as a result, the station group as a whole was hit hard by financial difficulties. Longtime anchors were either dismissed or saw significant pay cuts. The station still produced less news content during the week than its competitors (24 1/2 hours, compared to 36 for WGRZ/WUTV and up to 40 for WIVB-TV/WNLO), is the only one that does not produce a weekend morning newscast; both competitors also produce 10 p.m. newscasts for other stations, which WKBW does not. From September to November 2008, no Saturday newscasts were produced and the station again suspended its Saturday 6 p.m. newscast in 2010 and 2011 (though its late newscast now airs after college football). From 2005 to 2012, the station only employed two meteorologists compared to WIVB-TV's four and WGRZ's five (WKBW-TV used general assignment reporters on weekend weather forecasts during this time) and only two sports anchors compared to WGRZ's four (WIVB-TV also currently has just two sports reporters). The station also relied more on photojournalists than its competitors, and as a result, it has fewer general assignment reporters. As the Great Recession set in at the start of 2008, ABC prime time and syndicated early prime programming was often preempted with paid programming to make up lost revenue, but this practice has effectively ended as ABC has mandated full, in-pattern carriage of its schedule outside true breaking news and severe weather situations. Since January 31, 2008, union employees at that station who work as producers, engineers, reporters, photographers and assignment desk editors, had been working without a contract. Talks were ongoing between NABET Local 25 and the management at WKBW-TV, though recent contract offers have been rejected. The two sides, after significant acrimony and a complaint to the National Labor Relations Board, came to an agreement on March 4, 2011. Upon WKBW-TV general manager Bill Ransom's retirement, his replacement, Mike Nurse, made a concerted effort to reverse the damage done during Ransom's tenure, boosting the weather staff to four meteorologists (all of which are natives to Western New York), revamping the morning show with new hosts and a new name and moving to a three-man sports department. Scripps further increased the staff to five meteorologists and again revamped the news department largely with familiar names in Buffalo television.

== News operation ==
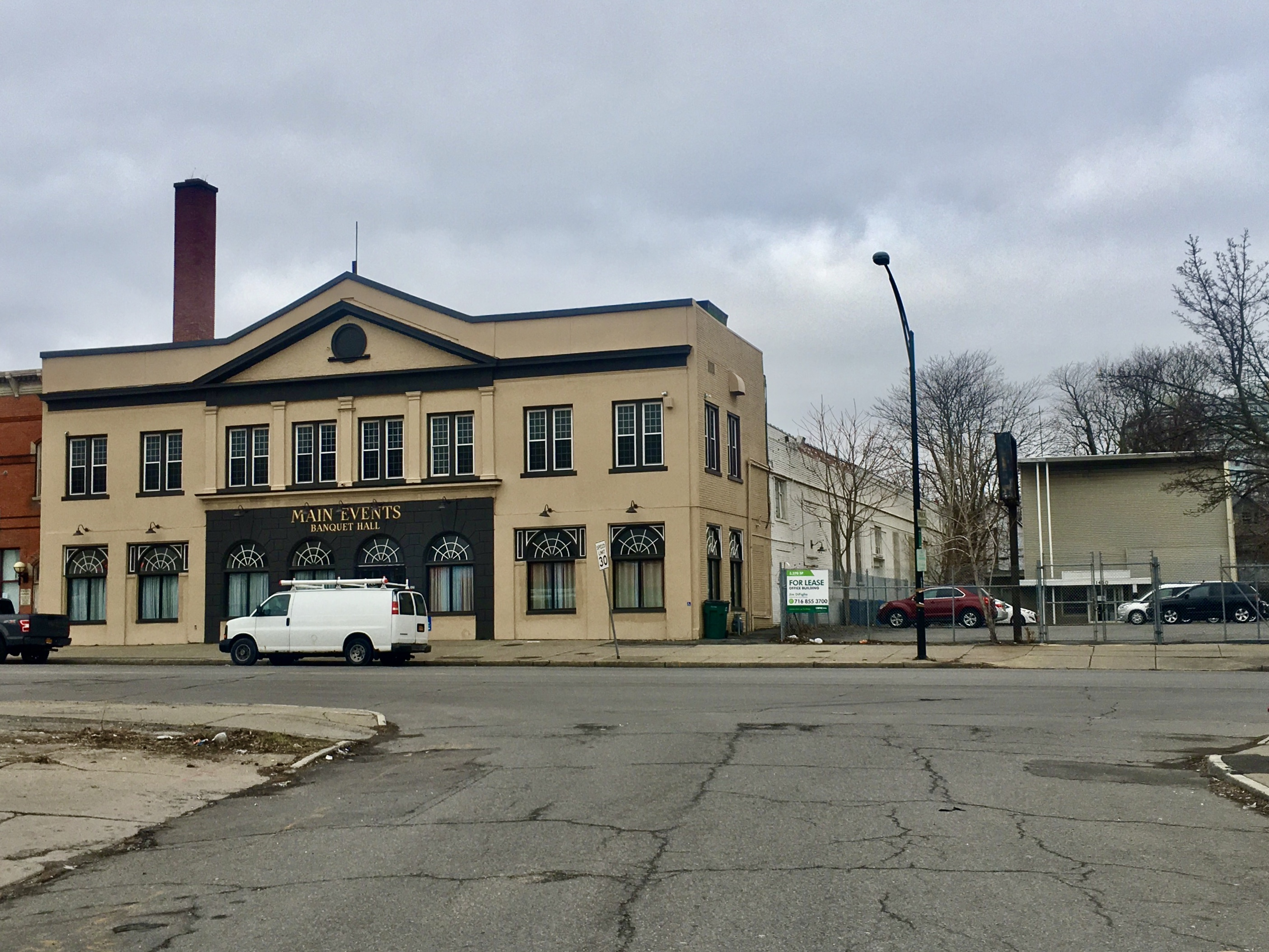
The original studio of WKBW, which housed the station from its sign on in 1958 to 1978.

WKBW-TV currently broadcasts 32 hours of locally produced newscasts each week (with six hours each weekday and one hour each on Saturdays and Sundays). In addition, the station produces a half-hour sports wrap-up program Sunday Sports Final, which airs Sunday evenings after the 11 p.m. newscast. Along with forecasts for WKBW-TV's news programs, WKBW-TV's weather staff also provides forecasts for two local radio stations owned by Townsquare Media, WTSS and WYRK, as well as for Audacy-owned WBEN.

=== The Irv, Rick and Tom era (1970–1989) ===
The station had news operations from its beginning, but ceased broadcasting a 6 p.m. newscast in the fall of 1965, due to a mass exodus of viewers to WBEN-TV. In lieu of a 6 p.m. newscast, WKBW-TV's evening newscast aired at 7:20 p.m. in its early years. From 1970 to September 1, 2003, and again from October 27, 2008, to December 31, 2021, WKBW-TV has called its news operation Eyewitness News and used variations of the iconic circle 7 logo until 2022. However, since the fall of 1972, it borrowed most of the basic elements of the "Action News" format used at longtime sister station WPVI-TV in Philadelphia, combined with the format news director Irv Weinstein developed and called "Rock 'n' Roll Radio News" (modified for television). It even used "Move Closer to Your World," the theme song made famous by WPVI-TV (though it was known by the station as "The Eyewitness News Theme" and WKBW, through its employee Walt Liss, claimed to be the station that originated it—despite the theme bearing strong similarities to WPVI's existing theme by Tom Sellers). Furthermore, WKBW-TV was a source for much of WPVI-TV's on-air talent. Weinstein was WKBW-TV's main anchor from 1964 until his retirement on New Year's Eve 1998, doubling as news director for most of that time. From 1965 to 1989, he was partnered with sports director Rick Azar and weatherman Tom Jolls (who had been poached from WBEN-TV and did double duty as host of Commander Tom); the three formed the longest continuously running anchor team in television history until Azar's retirement in 1989. The noon newscast, during the mid-1970s, featured the first pairing of the long-running WPVI anchor team of Jim Gardner and Dave Thomas (now known as Dave Roberts), with Danny Neaverth frequently filling in for Thomas. Gardner's successor, Don Postles, would largely remain in Buffalo but would become better known on another station as the anchor at WIVB-TV for 30 years. Prior to 1983, the station adhered to the National Association of Broadcasters's Seal of Good Practice. The station's morning news program, the first in Western New York, debuted in 1989. Good Morning Western New York (the program's title from 1989 to 2000 and from September 2009 to September 2010) initially started at 6 a.m., before moving up to 5:30 a.m. in 1996 and 5 a.m. by 2000; as of August 2016, it currently starts at 4:30 a.m. Between 2000 and September 1, 2003, and from October 27, 2008, to 2009, the morning show was known as Eyewitness News This Morning and from September 2, 2003, to October 24, 2008, was known as 7 News This Morning (WKBW-TV's morning show predated by seven years the next competitor, WIVB-TV, which did not debut its morning newscast, Wake Up! until 1994. WGRZ-TV followed suit with Daybreak in 1996).

=== 1989–2003 ===
From about 1989 until February 1997, the station identified itself as News Channel 7, but kept the Eyewitness News name for its newscasts out of posterity, resulting in rather long station announcements (for example, "From WKBW-TV News Channel 7, this is Eyewitness News at 5"); a similar situation arose on then-CBS affiliate WJXT in Jacksonville, Florida, from 1997 to 2002, that station also continued to call its newscasts Eyewitness News while identifying as WJXT NewsChannel 4 for general purposes. During this era, it also reorchestrated the "Move Closer to Your World" theme with a more futuristic synthesizer-based version. From 1998 to 2002, it used the slogan "Your Hometown Advantage". Eyewitness News had been the most-watched newscast in the Buffalo market for years and was at times even more popular in the Toronto market than the local news programs in that area. Some critics have contended this was due to Canadian viewers' attitudes that local Toronto television newscasts were "staid" and "boring" as contrasted with WKBW-TV's "tabloid" and "sensational" style of production, with American television stations approaching local news coverage as a "product" rather than a "public service", as is Canada's tradition. However, in 2000, the Nielsen ratings system switched the Buffalo market from a diary market to an automatically metered market and in part because of WKBW-TV's inflated reputation (coupled with Weinstein's and Jolls' respective retirements), eventually rival WIVB-TV overtook the #1 spot, although it was still very much a three-way battle between the market's local news stations.

Beginning in the mid-1990s, Granite forced changes upon the station in the search for more profits from their stations at the cost of their longtime reputations (the same issues befell a sister ABC affiliate, WPTA, in Fort Wayne, Indiana), and refused to renew its longtime bedrock syndicated programming, including Oprah, which served as the lead-in for WKBW-TV's 5 p.m. news; rival WIVB-TV picked up the show along with Wheel of Fortune and Jeopardy! to serve as the lead-in to WIVB-TV's prime time programming at a time when CBS began to rebuild its ratings strength and channel 4 picked up most of the games of the Buffalo Bills through the NFL on CBS. The replacement with lower-cost (and often lower-rated) syndicated programming, which often lasted less than three seasons, if even that, hastened the decline of channel 7's ratings, while WIVB took advantage of Granite's lack of investment in the former market leader.

In 2000, WKBW-TV displaced longtime 5 p.m. anchor Kathleen Leighton to mornings in favor of former channel 4 weather anchor Maria Genero, who had hosted Good Day New York downstate for New York City's Fox affiliate, WNYW. Genero's experience as an evening news anchor was minimal and within months, Leighton quit the station, with Genero being moved to mornings. Not long afterward, WIVB-TV passed WKBW-TV for first place in nearly all timeslots—the first time in almost 30 years that WKBW-TV had lost the lead. In 2002, after four years of using "Your Hometown Advantage", WKBW-TV adopted the franchised slogan "Live, Local, Late Breaking" and launched WNY Live! on September 2, 2002, with local management intent on using the program for long-term sustaining feature segments. Granite management didn't see growth in the show however and soon converted it into an advertorial program (a fate soon also pushed upon AM Buffalo). The show was effectively a 'dead zone' for the station's ratings and offered little-to-no lead-in support as viewers with channels 2 and 4 stuck with their newscasts after 5 p.m., leaving WKBW's ratings marooned with no support outside network lead-ins.

The station's presentation of its newscasts had also grown incomparable to that of WGRZ and WIVB, often looking dated even at that time due to Granite's struggles to attain revenue and replace and add new on-air equipment and disinvested from supporting a news helicopter and weather department upgrades; when they did so, they instead purchased late-model equipment and software which made the station look 'small market', a jarring image compared to how its local and Canadian competitors treated Buffalo and Toronto as a competitive and broad multi-national market, with even Toronto stations becoming more aggressive in their reporting and imaging.

In September 2003, however, came the most damaging change, as Granite and management dropped the last remnants connecting channel 7 to its glory days under Capital Cities.

=== First 7 News era (2003–2008) ===
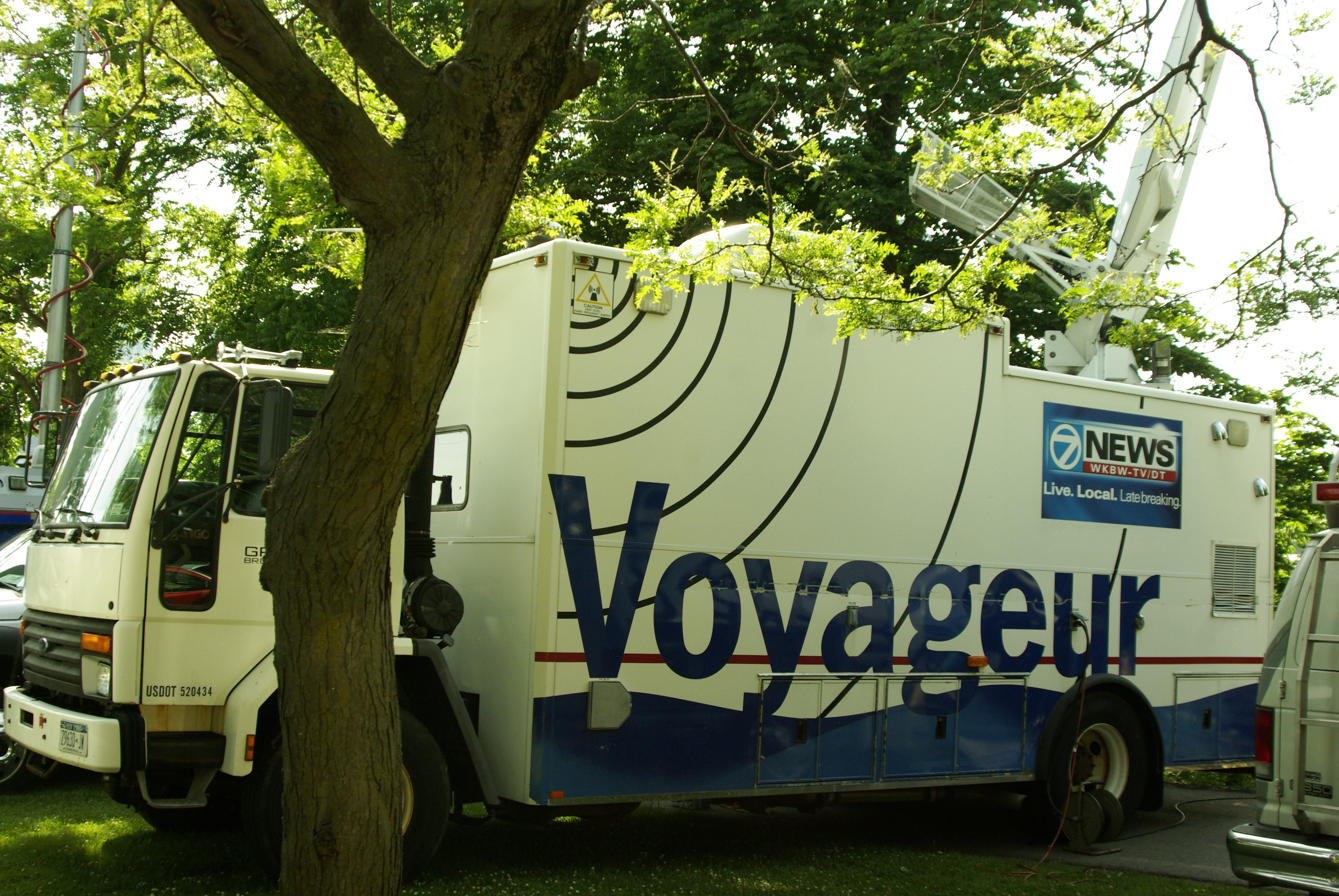
WKBW-TV satellite truck with branding from the 7 News era.

WKBW-TV decided to adopt a new identity, thus bringing the Eyewitness News era to an end. The station's newscasts were rebranded as 7 News in September 2003 and "Move Closer to Your World" was dropped in favor of a more contemporary news music package (Right Here, Right Now by 615 Music). From 2006 to 2007, WKBW-TV also produced Sportsnite, a nightly sports talk program hosted by members of WKBW-TV's sports department, that aired weeknights at 7 p.m. on WNGS. However, in April 2007, due to poor ratings despite a barrage of advertising, the Buffalo Sabres being in the playoffs and the upcoming 2007 NFL draft, Sportsnite was canceled. WNGS was not available on satellite providers during Sportsnite's run, therefore limiting the show's audience. Through 2009, WKBW-TV continued to produce a special version of Sportsnite, Sportsnite Niagara, in cooperation with Niagara University during college hockey and basketball season. WKBW-TV suspended its Saturday newscasts in September 2008, during college football season; the station resumed those newscasts that December after football season ended (in previous years, each newscast was delayed approximately one hour in the event of football games).

=== Return to Eyewitness News (2008–2011) ===
The station revived "Move Closer to Your World" for promotions celebrating the station's 50th anniversary, for the intro to breaks during its newscasts. It also reintroduced the theme for the introduction to its 11 p.m. newscasts on September 19, 2008 (along with the restoration of the "Do you know where your children are?" speech), and began using the Eyewitness News name for its 2 a.m. one-minute news brief. On October 22, 2008, WKBW-TV news anchors launched what has been described as the "Big Tease," an announcement that an ostensibly top-secret "major change" was coming; although only a few of the senior members of the staff knew about the change, it was widely predicted to be a revival of the Eyewitness News name and classic theme. On October 27, 2008, beginning with its morning newscast, the Eyewitness News brand permanently returned to WKBW-TV's newscasts, and "Move Closer to Your World" was fully restored to all of the station's newscasts. Nevertheless, the station retained the 2003 studio set and graphics package for the next two years and the 7 News branding and "Live, Local, Late Breaking" slogan were relegated to the 2 a.m. news brief. Preliminary results were promising: due to this and WIVB-TV's carriage disputes with Time Warner Cable and Atlantic Broadband, WKBW-TV's newscasts climbed back to a strong second place, behind WGRZ. Although it had retreated back to third when WIVB-TV returned to the two cable providers, WKBW-TV kept a number of viewers gained during the dispute and has made the Buffalo market's television newscasts a much closer three-way ratings race again, with only the station's morning newscast still in distant third. Ratings have waffled since that time. From September 2009 to September 2010, the title of the morning newscast was changed to Good Morning WNY. After Bridget Blythe's departure in October 2010, the morning show reverted it back to the Eyewitness News This Morning title, with Ginger Geoffery and Patrick Taney as anchors. The morning show increased its popularity in key demographics, tying WIVB-TV for second place in the ratings in May 2011; however, ratings for the 11 p.m. newscast dropped to fourth place among the market's late evening news broadcasts, behind the WIVB-TV-produced 10 p.m. newscast on WNLO. WKBW-TV also updated its set and graphics in October 2010. Ratings somewhat rebounded by October 2011; WKBW-TV's 11 p.m. newscast jumped to second place, behind WIVB-TV but ahead of WGRZ.

=== Upgrade to high definition ===
On August 13, 2011, beginning with its 6 p.m. newscast, WKBW-TV became the first television station in the Buffalo market to begin broadcasting its local newscasts in high definition. The move coincided with WKBW-TV's decision to outsource its master control operations to a company in Atlanta, Georgia; although it resulted in the loss of several Buffalo jobs, the master control outsourcing was far less expensive than attempting to upgrade the existing master control room from standard definition to HD. Rival WGRZ, which had been using a mix of HD graphics and upconverted SD video, announced its intentions to upgrade to true HD in response to this, which it did on October 29, 2011. Market leader WIVB-TV, which originally announced no intention to upgrade to true HD, announced its intentions to upgrade to true HD in response to its two rivals, which it did on February 1, 2012. WKBW-TV's studio cameras are true HD; however, the bulk of the station's news video is produced in 4:3 standard definition, which is then upconverted to a 16:9 aspect ratio.

=== 2010–2013 ===
The early 2010s were a time of upheaval for the WKBW-TV newsroom as Ransom and news director John Di Sciullo, two key leaders, departed the station (Ransom retired, while Di Sciullo left for WBBZ). Ransom's replacement, Michael Nurse, sought to overhaul the relatively undermanned newsroom by increasing the staff and overhauling the morning show. Brought in to host the newly branded Good Morning were out-of-market newcomers Cole Heath and Tiffany Lundberg, with meteorologist and feature reporter Mike Randall held over from the previous staff. However, WIVB-TV strengthened their morning show staff at the same time, undermining any possible gains WKBW-TV may have made with its re-staffing and the morning show lost a third of its audience in the fall of 2013, even with promos for the morning show during Bills preseason coverage (which may have actually backfired, as the ad campaign had portrayed Heath and Lundberg as unable to pronounce the names of towns in the station's coverage area).

=== Scripps takes over (2014–2021) ===
In August 2014, one year after the revamp, Good Morning was canceled, Heath and Lundberg were fired, and Randall was demoted to weekends (at his request, to accommodate his acting career). In its place, a straight Eyewitness News-branded newscast with a particular focus on weather was introduced, featuring Gray and meteorologist Andy Parker (who at the time was meteorologist for competitor Daybreak on market-leading WGRZ), both of whom returned to WKBW-TV after several years elsewhere; already on-staff meteorologist Autumn Lewandowski also contributes. Scripps planned on using WKBW-TV's morning show as a pilot system to test the format; had it been successful, the company would have rolled out the new format on its other stations across the United States. The format wasn't well received, and the morning show was reformatted to a more standard newscast beginning on September 21, 2015, with Gray being replaced by Katie Morse, who came over from then-Time Warner Cable News in a trade that sent 12-year news veteran John Borsa to Time Warner Cable News. On the evening news front, veteran anchorman Keith Radford was signed to a contract extension following the Scripps takeover while Sports Reporter Jeff Russo was promoted to co-anchor.

On September 27, 2014, WKBW-TV adopted the standardized imaging and graphics used by other Scripps stations, and changed its circle 7 logo, the last remaining remnant of the 7 News era, to the once-ABC O&O proprietary version, matching that of new sister station WXYZ-TV in Detroit; by coincidence, like WKBW-TV, WXYZ-TV was another station sold off by ABC to Scripps in the Capital Cities-ABC merger of 1986 to comply with ownership limits. Its Eyewitness News branding was initially retained, albeit with a slight alter to "7 Eyewitness News," until it was dropped in January 2022. The station initially continued to incorporate the classic "Move Closer to Your World" theme into its newscast openings until 2016 when it was dropped completely in favor of the Scripps "Inergy" theme, a move that caused a decline in viewership, since the theme had been used for over four decades (with a hiatus during the 7 News era), and was a longtime television staple among a number of Western New Yorkers and Southern Ontarians.

In early 2015, WKBW, in partnership with the Western New York Chevy Dealers, introduced the "7 First Alert Mobile Weather Lab"; a specialized SUV designed for storm chasing, complete with a dashcam, multiple radar sources, and a built-in weather station for live broadcasts. This made WKBW the first and only television station in the Buffalo market that owns and operates their own storm chaser vehicle.

In December 2015, Co-Anchor, Joanna Pasceri, was replaced by newcomer, Ashley Rowe, who joined Keith Radford and Jeff Russo at the anchor desk.

In August 2016, WKBW hired Don Paul, the longtime chief meteorologist at rival WIVB. It also promoted Sports Reporter Joe Buscaglia to Sports Director, and added one half hour to its morning newscasts to begin at 4:30 a.m. in response to its rivals. The hiring of Paul and another reporter, Ali Touhey, was originally to provide personnel for a weekend morning newscast that Scripps had planned to launch on the station in early 2016, but Scripps postponed, then ultimately canceled the newscast before it debuted. As a result, WKBW's First Alert weather team had eight meteorologists on their payroll (including two freelancers and mostly off-air graphic artist Dave Vogan), by far the most of any station in the market. Citing budget issues, WKBW released Paul after his two-year contract expired in December 2018; he eventually returned to WIVB.

In April 2017, WKBW received a brand new set which is inspired by the Scripps graphics package.

In fall 2017, WKBW began airing The Now, a local/national hybrid lifestyle and soft news magazine, in the 7 p.m. time slot, following World News Tonight and preceding The List. It initially outrated WIVB's 6:30 p.m. newscast on WNLO, the only comparable competition, but ratings quickly collapsed after several months.

WKBW has an association with Syracuse University's S. I. Newhouse School of Public Communications, employing entry-level graduates of the university as part of the school's Journalism Career Program. Most move on to other stations in the Scripps portfolio within a few years.

On August 6, 2019, it was announced that General Manager, Michael Nurse, as well as two key Sales Managers, were let go. Although details were not provided, it was speculated that the changes occurred as a result of the station's continuing ratings woes, and a preference for Scripps to move the station in a new direction. Marc Jaromin was hired to replace Nurse. Jaromin criticized his technical and on-air staff for multiple technical and editorial errors during a December 21 simulcast of an NFL Network Thursday Night Football game airing on a Saturday night with the Bills against the rival New England Patriots (a game that effectively determined that season's AFC East division championship), stating the game broadcasts and pre-game and post-game shows were well below the broadcast standards for an NFL market station.

On December 18, 2020, longtime AM Buffalo host Linda Pellegrino retired after three decades of hosting the morning show. Melanie Camp, who joined AM Buffalo several months prior, took over as host three days later.

In 2020, WKBW and reporter Charlie Specht were honored with an Alfred I. duPont–Columbia University Award for an investigation into a church cover-up of child sexual abuse inside the Catholic Diocese of Buffalo.

Lead anchor Keith Radford, who had been reduced to a part-time schedule in 2019, announced his intent to retire at the end of 2020; however, he ended up staying until June 2021. He was replaced by 5:30 pm anchor, Jeff Russo.

=== Second 7 News era (2022–present) ===
On January 1, 2022, WKBW ditched its Eyewitness News branding for the second time after 13-plus years. Its newscasts returned to the "7 News" brand for the first time since October 26, 2008. With the change, WKBW also abandoned its circle 7 logo for the first time since the late 1950s, instead adopting a standalone block sans-serif 7 closely resembling the station's first logo from 1958.

In June 2022, Ashley Rowe opted to leave to spend more time with family and was replaced by Lia Lando.

In October 2023, the station hired Michael Wooten, a longtime reporter and anchor for rival WGRZ, to host a new 5:30 p.m. newscast focusing on long-form interviews and features.

In 2024, WKBW and the 7 News I-Team were honored as an Alfred I. duPont–Columbia University Award finalist for an investigation into police misconduct. It marked the second time the station was honored by the university.

By 2026, Scripps's investment into WKBW's operations were regarded as a failure, as the station remained in a distant third place. Scripps began retreating on its investment in 2026 by cutting personnel as part of a broader company-wide staff reduction and pre-recording select newscasts.

=== Notable former staff ===
- Rick Azar – sports director (1958–1989; first voice ever heard on WKBW as he signed on the station in 1958, was the station's sports director for 28 years)
- Stan Barron – sports director (1958–1965); the station's first sports director (Azar held other duties for the time)
- Brenda Brenon – sports reporter (1987–1994)
- Melanie Camp – host of AM Buffalo (2020–2022)
- Liz Dribben – co-host of Dialing for Dollars (1964–1968)
- Jim Gardner – anchor (1974–1976)
- Tom Jolls – weather forecaster/Commander Tom Show host (as Commander Tom 1965–1991), announcer (1965–1999)
- Jeff Kaye – announcer (1965–1977)
- John Murphy – sports director (1989–September 16, 2007)
- Danny Neaverth – weather (1970s)
- Mike Randall – meteorologist and feature reporter (1983–2023)
- Dave Thomas – host of Dialing for Dollars/Rocketship 7 (1960s–1978)
- Tommy Shannon – host of Buffalo Bandstand (1960s)
- Clip Smith – sports/weather anchor (1971–1989)
- Mark Thompson – reporter and weather anchor
- Mary Travers – "Action 7" consumer reporter (now known as "Mary Travers-Murphy")
- Irv Weinstein – reporter/anchor (1964–1998)
- Frankie Yankovic – host of Polka Time (1962)

== Technical information ==
=== Subchannels ===
The station's signal is multiplexed:

Subchannels of WKBW-TV
Subchannel	Res.	Short name	Programming
7.1	720p	WKBW-HD	ABC
7.2	480i	Bounce	Bounce TV
7.3	480i	Grit	Grit
7.4	480i	Mystery	Ion Mystery
7.5	480i	HSN	HSN
7.6	480i	MVSGLD	MovieSphere Gold
49.2	480i	Nest	The Nest (WNYO-TV)

Broadcast on behalf of another station

Between 2009 and 2015, the station had not multiplexed its channels. The two networks carried by WKBW-TV on its digital subchannels prior to 2009 (Retro Television Network, via WNGS, and the now-defunct World Championship Sports Network) were later carried on WGRZ-TV; Retro is now on WBXZ-LD. It was announced that WKBW-TV would air the Laff network on 7.2 starting on April 15, 2015; however, the launch was delayed due to equipment issues. Both Laff and Escape, which airs on 7.3, debuted on April 28, 2015. Shortly following WUTV dropping its affiliation with the network, WKBW added Grit as a third subchannel in mid/late June 2017.

=== Analog-to-digital conversion ===
WKBW-TV ended regular programming on its analog signal, over VHF channel 7, on June 12, 2009, the official date on which full-power television stations in the United States transitioned from analog to digital broadcasts under federal mandate. The station's digital signal remained on its pre-transition UHF channel 38, using virtual channel 7. VHF channel 7 was reassigned to WNGS (channel 67, now WBBZ-TV), at the time under the control of WKBW, for its post-transition digital channel.

On March 13, 2020, WKBW moved its physical frequency down to channel 34 (previously held by WVTT-CD, which moved down the dial to VHF channel 11) as the result of a domino effect stemming from the broadcast spectrum auction. The station's virtual channel 7 did not change.

== See also ==
- Bruce Almighty
- Circle 7 logo
