= WBES-TV =

Television station in Buffalo, New York (1953)

- Buffalo, New York; United States
- Channels: Analog: 59 (UHF)

Programming
- Affiliations: Independent

Ownership
- Owner: Buffalo-Niagara Television Corporation

History
- First air date: September 29, 1953
- Last air date: December 19, 1953

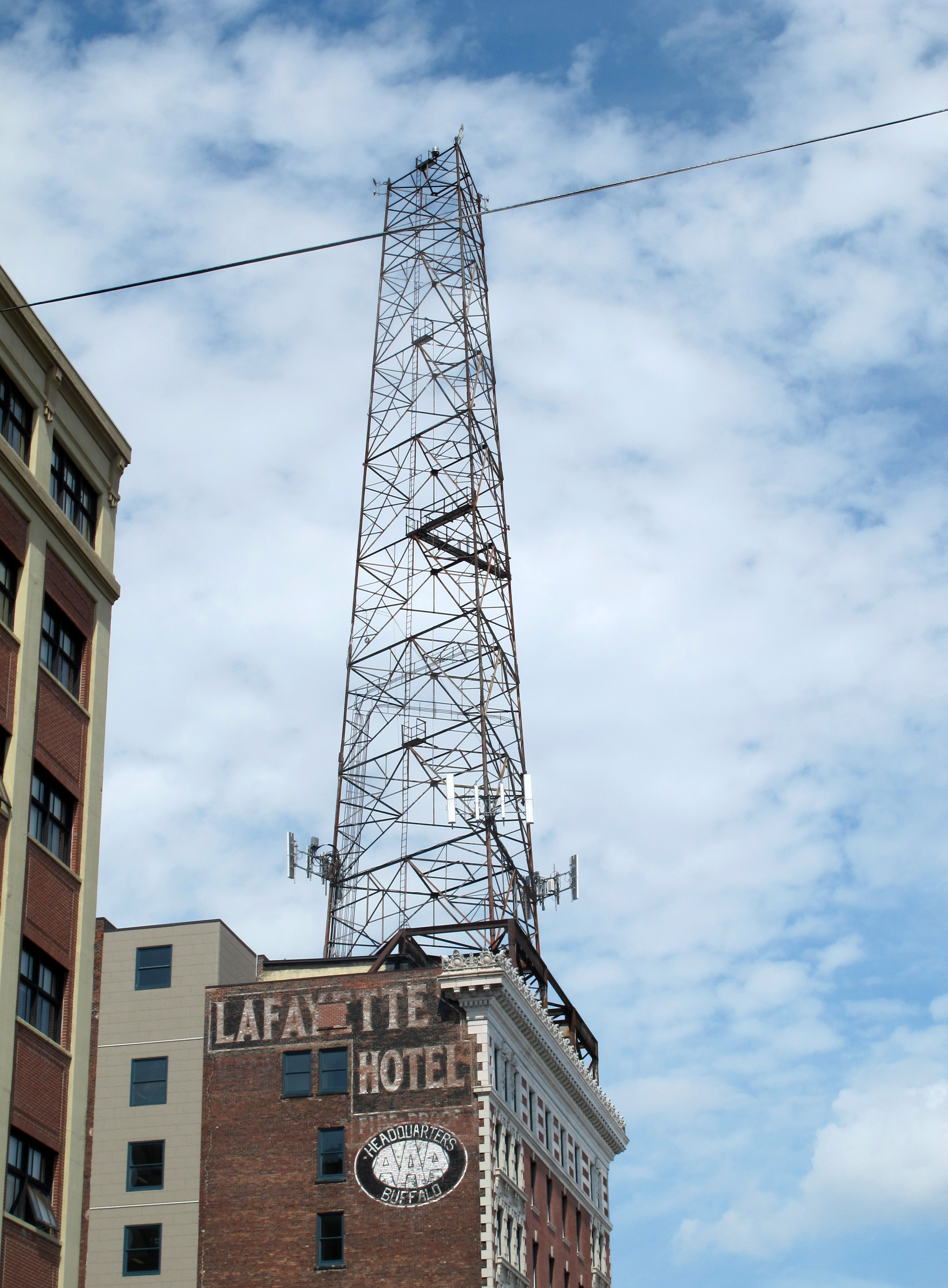
WBES-TV tower atop Hotel Lafayette

WBES-TV was an early UHF television station in Buffalo, New York. The station was formerly owned by the Buffalo-Niagara Television Corporation, a subsidiary of local law firm Diebold & Millozzi.

== History ==
The station operated on UHF channel 59 from studios in the Hotel Lafayette in Buffalo. WBES-TV, the second UHF station (and third TV station overall) in Western New York, was very short-lived, signing on September 29, 1953 and shutting down for the last time on December 19 of the same year. An independent station for its entire existence, WBES-TV was plagued by technical and financial problems, the primary factor in the station's failure. Its efforts to affiliate with a network were rejected, as the networks were waiting on the remaining VHF allocations to be built.

Tom Jolls, at the time a radio personality at Lockport's WUSJ, was one of the station's personalities. He would eventually return to television a decade later, first with WBEN-TV (channel 4, now WIVB-TV), then more permanently with WKBW-TV (channel 7), where he spent 24 years as a weatherman.

After WBES-TV was shut down, Buffalo was left with two stations, market leader WBEN-TV and fellow UHF upstart WBUF-TV (channel 17); WGR-TV (channel 2) signed on for the very first time on August 14, 1954, using WBES-TV's broadcast tower.

In 1955, WBES-TV's channel 59 allocation was sold to Frontier Television, who in 1957 petitioned the Federal Communications Commission to move the allocation to channel 29. Planned as WNYT-TV, the new station would have operated out of the studios of WBUF and used equipment donated by that station. The FCC granted the move, though Frontier would never bring it to air after its chairman determined that competing against VHF channels was not economically feasible; channel 29 eventually made it to air as WUTV in 1970.
