= Dave Roberts (broadcaster) =

American television personality

- Born: David Thomas Boreanaz; February 14, 1936 (age 89); Buffalo, New York, U.S.
- Occupations: Weatherman, broadcaster
- Years active: 1954–2009
- Spouse: Patti Boreanaz (m. 1961)
- Children: 3; including David Boreanaz

David Thomas Boreanaz (born February 14, 1936) is an American retired television broadcaster who broadcast under the stage names Dave Thomas in Buffalo, and Dave Roberts in Philadelphia, Pennsylvania. He was the main weatherman for WPVI-TV in Philadelphia from 1983 until his retirement in 2009.

== Early life and education ==
Roberts was born in Buffalo, New York, to a working-class family, and he is of Valle d'Aosta (northern Italian) descent. The name Boreanaz corresponds to Slovene Borjanac (literally, 'resident of Borjana'). Roberts attended Syracuse University as a speech and dramatic arts student, graduating with dual majors in English and communications.

== Career ==
Roberts began working as a radio broadcaster at WAER-FM in Syracuse, New York, in 1954, later moving to WOLF-AM. His television broadcasting career began at WBUF in Buffalo in 1956. Two years later, Roberts served as the U.S. Army's news director for the Caribbean Forces Radio-TV Network, located in the Panama Canal Zone, as well as working in New York City as a broadcaster for Armed Forces Radio. In 1961, Roberts joined WKBW-TV as the station's weatherman and as the host of the children's show Rocketship 7, as well as hosting Dialing for Dollars. In Buffalo, because the use of ethnic surnames was at that time discouraged, he temporarily adopted David Thomas as his stage name.

He is also a member of the Screen Actors Guild; he has had roles in Blow Out, All My Children, Doogie Howser, M.D. and thirtysomething. His son David Boreanaz became famous for playing the vampire Angel in both Buffy the Vampire Slayer and its spin-off, Angel, as well as his role as FBI Agent Seeley Booth on Bones and as MCPO Jason Hayes on SEAL Team. Roberts made an uncredited cameo appearance, as an extra in the FBI office, in the 100th episode of Bones, "The Parts in the Sum of the Whole", which was directed by his son.

=== 6ABC ===
In 1978, Roberts joined WPVI-TV in Philadelphia as a co-host for the morning television show AM Philadelphia. To avoid possible confusion with Lisa Thomas-Laury, he changed his stage name from David Thomas to Dave Roberts. After the death of Jim O'Brien on September 25, 1983, he began reporting the weather for WPVI's Action News. In 1993, Roberts became a recipient of the National Weather Association's "Weathercaster Seal of Approval". In 2000, he was inducted into the Broadcast Pioneers of Philadelphia Hall of Fame, and selected "Person of the Year", the Broadcast Pioneers of Philadelphia's highest honor. The following year, he was inducted into the Buffalo, New York Broadcasting Hall of Fame.

On November 18, 2009, at age 73, Roberts announced his retirement from WPVI-TV. His last on-air appearance was on December 11, 2009, during the 6 p.m. newscast alongside long-time colleague Jim Gardner. Upon his retirement he was honored by the Philadelphia City Council for his broadcasting and charity work. In 2011 he and his son David were jointly awarded the gold medal by the Pennsylvania Association of Broadcasters for their successful careers in broadcasting and acting respectively.

== Personal life ==
Roberts and his wife Patti have two daughters and a son, David Boreanaz, who is an actor, director and producer. Roberts has made several uncredited appearances on his son's show Bones as an extra.

Roberts is well regarded for his community service. He is active with numerous charities in the Philadelphia metropolitan area and has hosted the Jerry Lewis MDA Telethon. He has been granted the "Man of the Year Achievement Award" by the Central Delco Lodge #2438, Order of the Sons of Italy in America, as well as being selected as "Person of the Year" by the Muscular Dystrophy Association.
