= Melanie Camp =

Australian actress

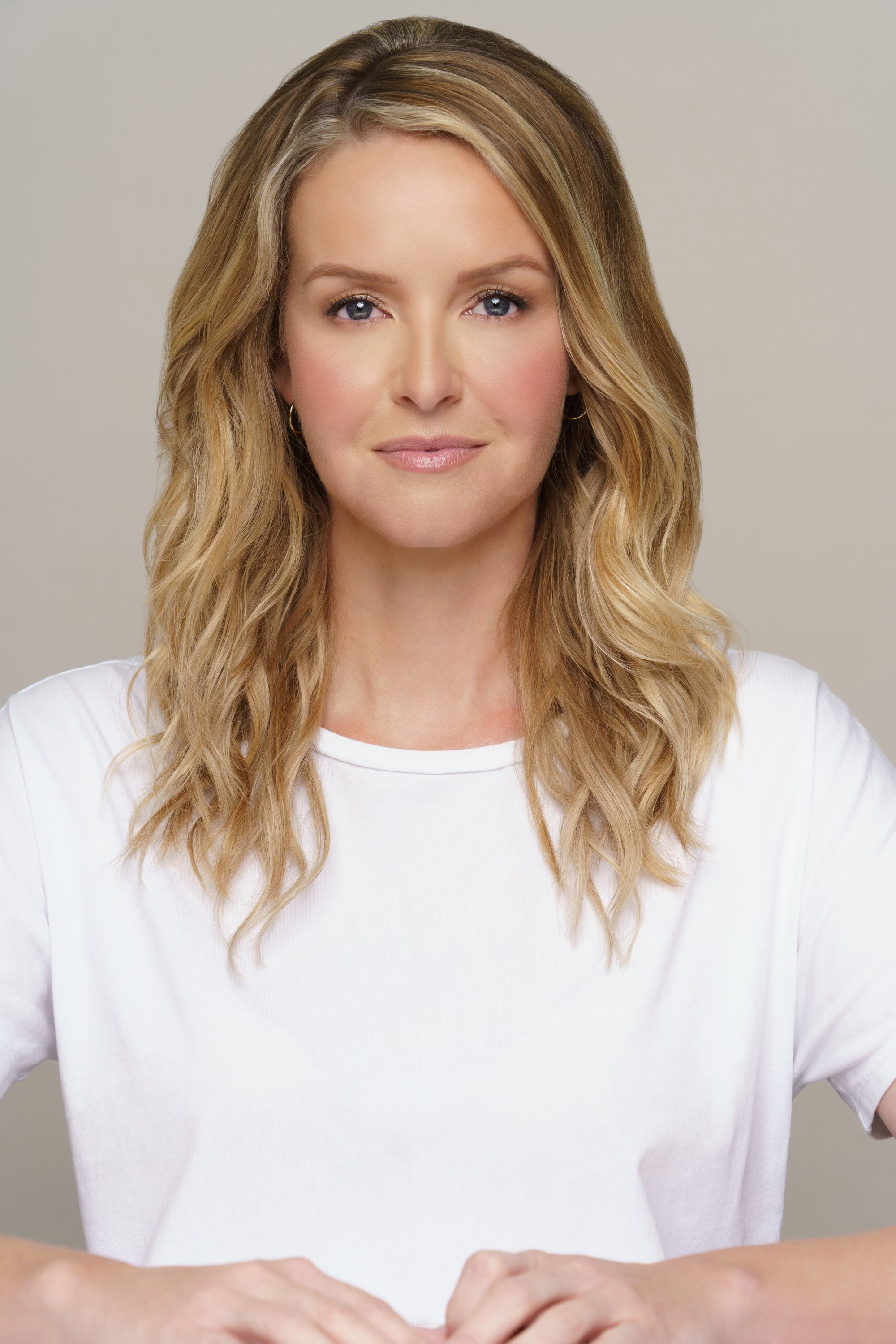
- Born: April 11, 1979 (age 46); Perth, Western Australia

Melanie Camp is a media professional based in Houston, Texas.

== Career ==
Melanie Camp is a local television correspondent. She is part of the team on "Houston Life", a live, daytime lifestyle show that airs weekdays on KPRC-TV.

Camp attempted to interview Shaquille O'Neal.

Camp was co-host on AM Buffalo, a weekday morning program on WKBW-TV, working alongside longtime host Linda Pellegrino, who retired in December 2020. After that, Camp started hosting the show. AM Buffalo was cancelled after 45 years.

She was in the gangster spoof "Hit Team".

She is a member of the fake band TigerTripp. Their single "The Ice Cream Song" was released in October 2014 and the music video had over 70,000 views on YouTube.
