= Mike Randall (entertainer) =

American actor, journalist, and writer

- Born: Michael E. Randall; November 2, 1953 (age 72); United States
- Occupations: Meteorologist, actor, playwright

Michael E. Randall (born November 2, 1953) is an American actor, playwright, meteorologist and reporter from Buffalo, New York. He is best known within his native Western New York for his long run on WKBW-TV, where was an on-air personality for 40 years from 1983 to 2023 and was the chief meteorologist from 1999 to 2013, and outside Western New York for his stage shows.

== Television career ==
Randall holds seals of approval from the National Weather Association (seal #9708542, which he has held since at least the early 1990s) and the American Meteorological Society (seal #1558, which he earned some time in the 2000s). Randall was the first and, until one-time Randall protege Andy Parker also earned his NWA seal, the only television meteorologist in Western New York to carry the NWA seal. His broadcasting education was obtained from Onondaga Community College, among others (Randall never actually graduated and had dropped out of four different colleges by the start of his broadcast career).

Prior to 1983, Randall worked at WFSB in Hartford and WDBJ-TV in Roanoke, as well as a brief stint as a commercial spokesman for, among others, the New York Lottery in 1978.

Randall joined WKBW-TV in 1983 as a feature reporter, filling a role previously held by Don Polec. His features are still occasionally rerun on WKBW today. In 1989, Randall was paired with Ann Edwards to host Good Morning Western New York, the first morning newscast in the Buffalo market. The series was originally conceived as being similar in format to The David Letterman Show, the short-lived morning show hosted by David Letterman in 1980, with an emphasis on humor. The show required him to learn weather forecasting, and although Tom Jolls had told Randall that a formal meteorology degree was not necessary, Randall enrolled in the program at Mississippi State University and earned a bachelor's degree in meteorology. From 1992 through 1993, Randall was named "Captain" of the children's television program Rocketship 7, on which he appeared with his wife and son. Upon Jolls's retirement in 1999, Randall was named chief meteorologist and moved to the station's evening newscasts. He was moved back to mornings in 2009 in an effort to revive the ratings of Good Morning Western New York.

In 2013, Randall came to an agreement with WKBW to keep him at the station through the end of 2015. The agreement reduced Randall's workload (Randall moved to weekends in September 2014) and granted him the title of senior meteorologist, allowing him to focus more time on his stage work. In September 2015, Randall renewed his contract with WKBW through the end of 2017. As part of the agreement, Randall was to move to a new weekend morning newscast (which never debuted), to make way for Don Paul, whom WKBW signed to cover weekend evenings.

Randall is a 2017 inductee of the Buffalo Broadcasters Association's 2017 Hall of Fame.

On July 19, 2023, Randall announced his retirement from WKBW, with his final appearance scheduled for August 24. Randall's departure came 40 years after his arrival at the station.

== Acting and theatrical work ==
Randall is known as a character actor and impersonator performing primarily in one-man shows. His best known impersonations are those of 19th century authors Mark Twain and Charles Dickens. The Twain performances are known as Mark Twain Live! and have been running since 1972. As Dickens, Randall traditionally recites the book A Christmas Carol as Dickens used to do on stage during his lifetime. He studied theater at State University of New York at Geneseo.

In 1975, Hal Holbrook, the creator of Mark Twain Tonight, filed a lawsuit against the then 22-year-old Randall alleging that Randall had plagiarized Holbrook's work, singling out Randall mainly because he had done a show in New York City, infringing on Holbrook's territory, and because he wanted to use the "accessible" Randall as an example to deter further Twain impersonators from plagiarizing his work. The two reached a settlement stating that Randall could not use any of Holbrook's work in future productions, but that Randall could continue impersonating Twain.

Randall also has a puppet show, "Reading is Magic with Mike Randall and Friends," which is geared toward children and encourages them to read.

In 2016, Randall wrote Shoot the Weatherman, a short two-hander one-act play in which a lawyer takes a meteorologist hostage for making an inaccurate forecast. It was followed in 2017 with Guns and Roses, a comedy in which a churchgoing couple purchases a gun to their young adult son's dismay.

Outside of his own shows, Randall has also appeared in Shakespeare in Delaware Park and at Buffalo's New Phoenix Theatre.
