= Liz Dribben =

American radio and television producer and host

Elizabeth L. Dribben
- Born: Elizabeth Louise Dribben; August 20, 1937; Detroit, Michigan
- Died: January 20, 2011 (aged 73); New York, New York
- Resting place: Cheektowaga, New York
- Occupations: Journalist, producer
- Known for: WKBW-TV; CBS Radio

Elizabeth L. Dribben (August 20, 1937 – January 20, 2011) was an American radio and television producer and host. She is best known for her time as a producer for CBS News from 1972 to 1993. Her previous work included at WKBW-TV in Buffalo, New York, and radio stations WEVD and WNYC in New York City.

== Early life ==
Dribben was born in Detroit, Michigan. The daughter of Louis Dribben and Clara Franklin. Her father was a special investigator for the US Immigration and Naturalization Service and her mother was an attorney, graduating from the University of Buffalo Law School in 1928. Her maternal grandparents were Polish Jews who immigrated to the US in the early 20th century, first to Kentucky and then to Buffalo, New York. Her paternal grandparents were Russian Jews who immigrated to New York City in the late 19th century. Her father died when she was only 10 months old. Dribben was an inquisitive child always asking questions. She was raised by her mother and her mother’s parents in Buffalo. She graduated from Lafayette High School at age 16, in 1954, and the University of Buffalo in 1958, majoring in drama and speech.

== Career ==
After graduating from college, she worked for a brief time at the University of Buffalo radio station WBFO-FM and in 1959 she began her television career at WKBW-TV as a production assistant. In 1964 she became co-host with Nolan Johannes of WKBW-TV's Dialing for Dollars. She also hosted her own show In Conversation, becoming the first woman TV anchor in Buffalo. In Conversation was a daily morning program featuring one-on-one interviews with well-known personalities of the day including Phyllis Diller, Jerry Lewis, Carol Burnett, Harry Belafonte, and Bill Russell. She left WKBW-TV in 1968 after a dispute over fair pay for equal work and went to New York City in search of better opportunity.

In New York, she did freelance work for Associated Press and ABC News until she found her dream job as a producer at CBS News Radio where she worked closely for 21 years with Dan Rather, Diane Sawyer, Mike Wallace, Ed Bradley, Douglas Edwards, Dallas Townsend, Charles Kuralt, and Charles Osgood. After leaving CBS in 1993 she became an adjunct professor at the Columbia School of Journalism teaching radio reporting.

== Personal life ==
Liz Dribben had no siblings and never married. She lived in Buffalo, New York until her move to New York City in 1969, where she died in 2011 at the age of 73. She is buried at Temple Beth El Cemetery in Cheektowaga, New York.

== Awards ==
- Buffalo Broadcasters’ Hall of Fame 2001 inductee.
- Lafayette High School Hall of Fame 2008 inductee.
