= Clip Smith =

American radio personality

Warren P. "Clip" Smith (April 22, 1941 – August 21, 2004) was a Buffalo, New York media personality and newsman. Smith was a sports reporter at WKBW-TV from 1971 until being fired in December 1988, and later returned to radio in Buffalo at WGR and WBEN (AM) as a conservative talk show host and commentator. He was the play-by-play announcer for the University at Buffalo Bulls in the mid-1980s. He is remembered for his "Clipley's Believe It or Don't" segments and the puns and one-liners he worked into his broadcasts. He was killed at age 63 in a car accident in Niagara County, New York. At the time of his death, Smith was a member of the Lockport Board of Education and had been a three-time candidate for mayor of Lockport, New York. In May 2005, Rep. Thomas M. Reynolds of New York paid tribute to Smith, noting that the "Clipper" earned his reputation for "his strong opinions, as well as his quick wit and one-liner quips."
