= Weather stick =

Native American meteorological tool

A weather stick is a traditional means of weather prediction used by some Native Americans. It consists of a balsam fir or birch rod mounted outdoors which twists upwards in low humidity and downwards in high-humidity environments. These sticks were first used by the Native Americans of the American northeast and the Canadian east and southeast, who noted the behavior of dry branches before the arrival of weather changes. The weather stick is a rare example of a weather prediction tool that predates the mercury barometer

== See also ==
- Barometry
