= Kevin Dupont =

American sports journalist

- Born: January 11, 1953 (age 73); Springfield, Massachusetts, USA
- Education: Boston University
- Occupation: Journalist
- Spouse: Brenda Brenon (m. 1994)
- Awards: (2002) Elmer Ferguson Memorial Award

Kevin Paul Dupont (born January 11, 1953) is an American sports journalist. During his career, Dupont has worked for the Boston Herald, The New York Times, and The Boston Globe. While with The Boston Globe in 2002, Dupont was awarded the Elmer Ferguson Memorial Award by the Hockey Hall of Fame.

== Early life ==
His father served in the United States Army, where he met his future wife in England. After giving birth to Dupont's older sister, the family moved to Bedford, Massachusetts, where he was born on January 11, 1953. Dupont graduated from Bedford High School in 1971 and was later inducted into their Athletic Hall of Fame.

== Career ==
In 1977, Dupont was hired as a sportswriter for the Boston Herald American, covering the Red Sox. Later, in 1979, Dupont was elected to the Baseball Writers' Association of America Board of Directors starting in 1980. He eventually left the Boston Herald American for The New York Times, where he covered the New York Islanders, New York Rangers, and New Jersey Devils until 1985. Due to his successful journalism career with the Times, Dupont was hired full-time with The Boston Globe as a beat writer.

In 2002, Dupont was awarded the Elmer Ferguson Memorial Award by the Hockey Hall of Fame.
