= Do you know where your children are? =

American public service announcement

"Do you know where your children are?" – a public service announcement

"Do you know where your children are?" is a question used as a public service announcement (PSA) for parents on American television from the late 1960s through the late 1980s. Accompanied by a time announcement, this phrase is typically used as a direct introduction for the originating station's late-evening newscast, typically at either 10:00 p.m. or 11:00 p.m.

== History ==
While the phrase itself had appeared in newspapers as early as the 19th century, usage of it in broadcasting started in the early 1960s following the enactment of nightly youth curfews for minors in multiple large cities.

When proposing a nightly youth curfew in the state in early 1961, Massachusetts state senator William X. Wall urged all radio and television broadcasters to ask the question on air, so as to remind parents to check up on their children. The first high-profile usage of the phrase was by KHJ-TV (KCAL-TV channel 9 since December 1989) in Los Angeles in 1964, which had the question read on-air by booth announcers during the nightly 10:00 p.m. station break. Following the adoption of a 10:30 p.m. curfew in Baltimore, WJZ-TV (channel 13) began running the announcement at 11:00 p.m. in consultation with the city's mayor Thomas D'Alesandro III; (Note: Thomas D'Alesandro III had proposed the curfew while still serving in Baltimore City Council; he became the mayor of Baltimore concurrent with WJZ-TV adopting the phrase.) this followed a series of documentaries produced by the station regarding issues facing younger generations and was inspired by positive reception of the PSA on Milwaukee television. WJZ-TV's owner Westinghouse Broadcasting quickly adopted this phrase for other stations owned by the chain, including KYW-TV (channel 3) in Philadelphia and WBZ-TV (channel 4) in Boston.

WNEW-TV (channel 5) in New York City, along with WKBW-TV (channel 7) in Buffalo, New York, are two of the more notable stations to have utilized this announcement. WNEW-TV began using the phrase spoken by Mel Epstein, WNEW-TV's director of on-air promotions, in 1967 in response to the rising level of crime in the city; it is still used by the station (known as WNYW since 1986) on a nightly basis. During the COVID-19 pandemic, the announcement was adjusted to encourage people to stay home during the pandemic with the phrase "Stay home. Stay safe. Stay strong. We're all in this together."

Outside of the United States, it was used at the beginning of the 9pm news on the Nigerian Television Authority in the 1980s.

== In popular culture ==
The PSA was featured on Time magazine's "Top 10 Public-Service Announcements" list.

The PSA was often parodied. The line appeared in the Simpsons episode "Bart After Dark", upon which Homer Simpson responded to the television, "I told you last night – no!", and as the tagline for the 1984 film Repo Man, as well as the 1999 film 200 Cigarettes. In X-Men comics at the time, fictional ads paid for by anti-mutant villains would ask, "Do you know what your children are?"

Michael Jackson's compilation album Xscape, posthumously released in 2014, includes a track titled "Do You Know Where Your Children Are", which was originally recorded in 1986 by Jackson before his "Bad" sessions, and was reworked between 2013 and 2014. In it, Jackson narrates the events of an underage girl who undergoes child sexual abuse and neglect.
