= Charming Disaster =

American goth band

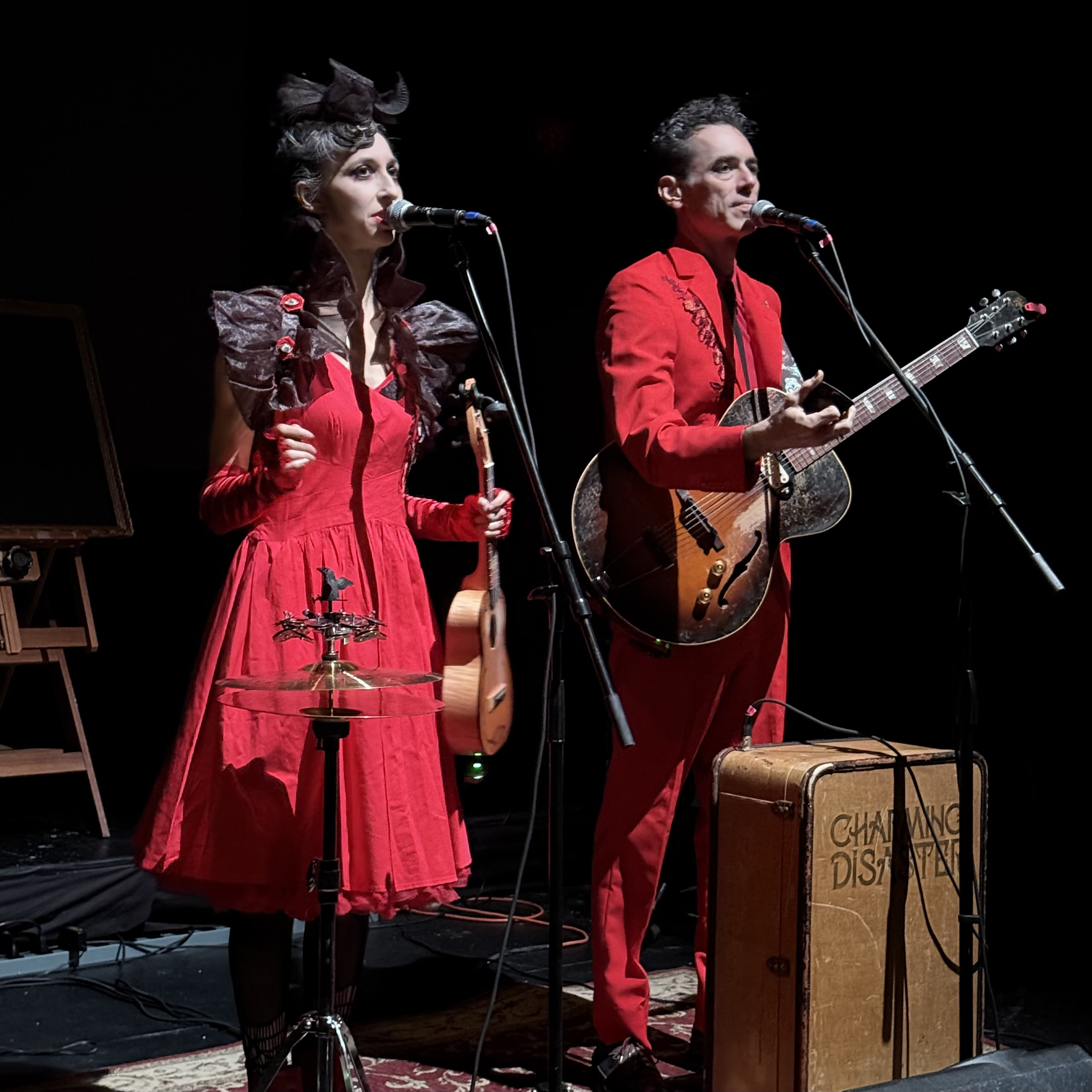

Background information
- Origin: Brooklyn, New York, United States
- Genres: Folk music, Dark cabaret
- Years active: 2012-present
- Members: Ellia Bisker; Jeffrey Morris
- Website: https://www.charmingdisaster.com/

Charming Disaster is an American musical duo from Brooklyn, New York formed in 2012 by Ellia Bisker and Jeff Morris. They are known for their songs involving myth, magic, folklore, science and the occult. Goldmine magazine described them as "[a] cross between Edward Gorey and Tim Burton set to music” who draw inspiration from the murder ballads of the Americana tradition. Their performances often overlap with other types of performance, including retro forms like the crankie (a small-scale moving panorama). They’ve opened for acts like the goth cabaret performer Voltaire, cello-rock act Rasputina, and the duo the Dresden Dolls.

== Career ==
=== Early History (2012—2013) ===
In August 2012, both Bisker and Morris were artists in bands of their own (Sweet Soubrette and Kotorino respectively). Bisker saw a Kotorino concert by chance and suggested writing songs together. They began drafting songs surrounding macabre subjects, such as a woman in love with a ghost, taking a road trip in a stolen car, and the romantic tension between a knife thrower and their assistant. They began performing as Charming Disaster in 2013.

=== Love, Crime & Other Trouble and Cautionary Tales (2014—2017) ===
In 2014, Charming Disaster began touring regularly. The podcast Welcome to Night Vale featured the band's song Ghost Story on an episode, almost immediately growing a cult following of dedicated fans.

The band's first studio album Love, Crime & Other Trouble was released in 2015, with Cautionary Tales to follow in 2017. They continued to regularly tour and wrote songs that would appear on future albums.

=== SPELLS + RITUALS and touring with Rasputina (2018—2020) ===
The band began touring full-time and included a variety of non-standard venues to their tour roster, such as graveyards, burlesque shows, a fetish club, and art galleries. In 2019, Spells + Rituals was released and they played nearly 100 shows in that year, and joined cello-rock troupe Rasputina for their Halloween tour.

=== The Pandemic Years (2020-2022) ===
In 2020, the band canceled all tour dates scheduled due to the COVID-19 pandemic. To supplement these missing dates and stay connected with their fans, the duo began hosting a weekly virtual concert known as the Quarantine Livestream. These shows were opportunities to play familiar songs, debut new music, and host an eclectic ensemble of guests, including puppeteers, milliners, authors, astrophysicists, visual artists and practicing witches. During this lull in touring activity and unable to record in a proper studio, the duo decided to record tracks for what would become “Our Lady of Radium” at Ellia’s parents’ home, which was sitting vacant just outside New York City. Working with just two microphones, the pair tracked all the instruments themselves (ukuleles, guitars, vocals, glockenspiel, bass, pots and pans, breath sounds, drum kit and piano).

=== Our Lady of Radium, Super Natural History, Time Ghost, and The Double (2022—Present) ===
They released their concept album inspired by the life, work, and science of Marie Curie, Our Lady of Radium, in 2022. Post-Covid, the band saw a revitalization on all fronts. They released three albums in consecutive years and began touring again, including their first international tour to Germany and Switzerland in 2024. In 2025 the duo released The Double, touring the continental US, the United Kingdom, and Scotland in support of the album.

== Discography ==
Studio Albums
Year	Album
2015	Love, Crime & Other Trouble
2017	Cautionary Tales
2019	SPELLS + RITUALS
2022	Our Lady of Radium
2023	Super Natural History
2024	Time Ghost
2025	The Double

Love, Crime & Other Trouble Track List

1. Ghost Story 4:01
2. Ocean City 3:31
3. Showgirl 5:26
4. Wolf Song 3:30
5. Artichoke 3:03
6. Secretary 3:29
7. Grifters 3:15
8. Osiris 3:11
9. Deep in the High 4:48
10. Knife Thrower 4:15
11. I Know You Know 3:00

Cautionary Tales Track List

1. Sympathetic Magic 5:13
2. Snake Bit 4:20
3. Selene and Endymion 4:18
4. Phosphorescent Lilies 4:50
5. Ragnarok 3:28
6. Little Black Bird 5:21
7. Days Are Numbered 6:48
8. Infernal Soiree 4:32
9. What Remains 4:05
10. String Break Song 2:57

SPELLS + RITUALS Track List

1. Blacksnake 4:24
2. Wishing Well 4:09
3. Baba Yaga 2:52
4. Devil May Care 4:09
5. Blue Bottle Blues 3:56
6. Heart of Brass 3:29
7. Keep Moving 2:50
8. Belladonna Melodrama 5:21
9. Fire Eater 3:00
10. Be My Bride of Frankenstein 3:45
11. Soft Apocalypse 2:22

Our Lady of Radium Track List

1. Bad Luck Hard Rock 4:04
2. Forces of Nature 5:10
3. Elemental 2:57
4. Power of the Sun 4:44
5. Eat Drink Sleep 4:54
6. Darkened Room 2:57
7. Radium Girls 3:43
8. A Glow About Her 4:41
9. Our Lady of Radium 4:49

Super Natural History Track List

1. Monsters 3:00
2. Mold and the Metals 4:03
3. Grimoire 4:05
4. Hellebore 4:00
5. Bat Song 4:45
6. Disembodied Head 2:55
7. Six Seeds 4:10
8. Paris Green 2:21
9. Manta Rays 2:53
10. Wrong Way Home 3:45

Time Ghost Track List

1. Cherry Red 4:27
2. Stockholm Syndrome 4:09
3. Ouroboros 4:29
4. I Am A Librarian 4:25
5. Houdini 3:34
6. Murderer 3:56
7. Driving to Idaho 3:00
8. East River Ferry Waltz 3:56
9. Longest Night of the Year 3:40
10. Spooky Action 4:05

The Double Track List

1. Black Locust 4:32
2. New Moon 4:23
3. Trick of the Light 4:52
4. Time Machine 3:38
5. Scavengers 3:35
6. Beautiful Night 3:03
7. Vitriol 3:50
8. Haunted Lighthouse 5:45
9. Gang of Two 3:48
10. Green Things 5:07
