= Jim Gardner (broadcaster) =

American retired news anchor (born 1948)

- Born: James Goldman; May 17, 1948 (age 78); New York City, New York, U.S.
- Education: Ethical Culture Fieldston School; Columbia University (BA)
- Occupation: News anchor
- Years active: 1970–2022
- Employer: WPVI-TV (1976–2022)
- Spouse: Amy
- Children: 4

James Goldman (born May 17, 1948), known professionally as Jim Gardner, is an American retired news anchor.

== Early life and education ==
Gardner was born in New York City and grew up on the Upper East Side in a Reform Jewish household. His father was Joseph Goldman, a professor and chairman of the ear, nose and throat department of Mount Sinai Medical Center. Through his father, he is the step-grandson of noted rabbi Mordecai Kaplan. He attended Ethical Culture Fieldston School. In 1970, he received his Bachelor of Arts degree in political science from Columbia University. As a student, he was a play-by-play announcer for football and basketball, and reported on the Columbia University protests of 1968 for the university's radio station, WKCR-FM.

== Career ==
In 1970, Gardner became a desk assistant, writer, and producer for 1010 WINS in New York City. In 1972, Gardner became a reporter for WFAS radio in White Plains, New York, and soon became news director. While not finding work in television, he considered re-enrolling for a graduate program at Brown University. Two years later, he began his television broadcast career at WKBW-TV in Buffalo, New York. He took the stage name Gardner because of antisemitism in the Buffalo community, and the thought that there were too many Jewish names on staff.

Gardner worked for WPVI in Philadelphia from June 1, 1976 to December 21, 2022. He started as a reporter and noon anchor, before anchoring the 5:30 PM news by November 1976. He had solo anchored the 6:00 PM weekday newscasts since May 11, 1977, replacing Larry Kane; he also solo anchored the 11:00 PM weekday newscast between May 11, 1977 and January 11, 2022. He covered every Democratic and Republican presidential convention from 1980 on, and interviewed every president and major presidential candidate from 1976 to 2022. Gardner has also traveled to the scene of breaking news across the world.

On November 10, 2021, Gardner announced his intentions to retire from broadcasting at the end of 2022. Prior to his retirement, Gardner left his position as anchorman on Action News at 11:00 PM on January 11, 2022, and remained on the 6:00 PM broadcast until his retirement and final broadcast at 6:00 PM on December 21, 2022.

== Awards and honors ==
Since 1987, Temple University awards The Jim Gardner Journalism Prize. Gardner funds a scholarship at Temple for one student at the school's college of media and communication.

The City of Philadelphia honored Jim Gardner on June 22, 2017 "for his hard work and dedication in the City of Philadelphia over the past 41 years."

Jim Gardner Way, the 4100 block of Monument Road outside the WPVI studios, was dedicated in 2022 in his honor. Additionally the studio from which all Action News broadcasts emanate from is now officially known as the Jim Gardner Studio.

- 1996 - Broadcast Pioneers of Philadelphia Person of the Year
- 2003 - Broadcast Pioneers of Philadelphia Hall of Fame
- 2022 - John Cardinal Foley Award for Excellence in Communication
- 2022 - The Walt Disney Company honored Gardner with their Mousecar award for his long service to that company, which owns WPVI-TV.

== Personal life ==
Gardner is married to former WPVI-TV sales executive Amy Goldman, who serves as chair of the Radnor Township School District board, and has two children with her, and two other children from a previous marriage. They live in Villanova.

== Filmography ==
=== Film ===
Year	Title	Role	Notes
2016	Team Foxcatcher	Self	Documentary

=== Television ===
Year	Title	Role	Notes
2002	Philly	News Anchor	Episode: "Thanks for the Mammaries"
2012	West Wing Week	Self	Episode: "True to Ourselves and Our History"
2018	Jeopardy!	Self / Clue Giver	2 episodes
2021	Philly D.A.	Self	Episode #1.7
2022	Abbott Elementary	Self	Episode: "Light Bulb"
