= Mark Longietti =

American politician and lawyer

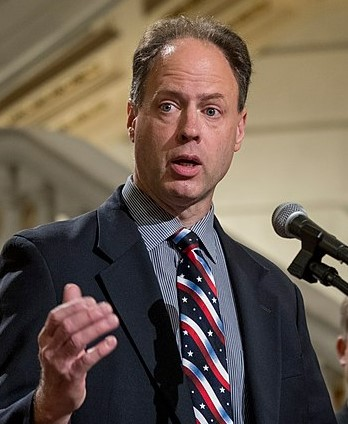

Member of the Pennsylvania House of Representatives from the 7th district
- In office January 2, 2007 – November 30, 2022
- Preceded by: Michael C. Gruitza
- Succeeded by: Parke Wentling

Personal details
- Born: January 16, 1964 (age 62) Sharon, Pennsylvania, U.S.
- Party: Democratic
- Spouse: Tina
- Education: Westminster College (BA); Boston College (JD)
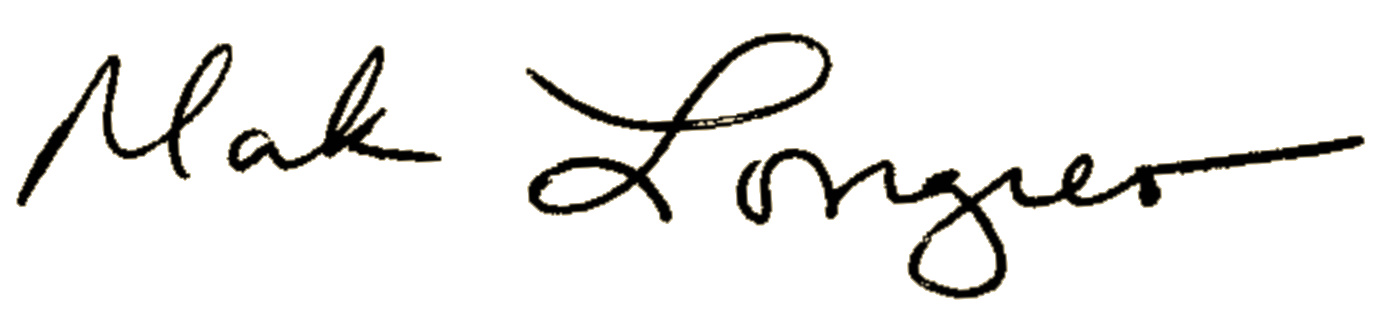
- Signature

Mark Alfred Longietti (born January 16, 1964) is an American politician and lawyer. A Democrat, he is a former member of the Pennsylvania House of Representatives, representing the 7th District from 2007 to 2022.

== Early life and education ==
Longietti was born on January 16, 1964, in Sharon, Pennsylvania. He graduated from Sharpsville Area High School in 1981. In 1985, Longiette graduated summa cum laude from Westminster College with a bachelor of arts in economics and political science. He earned his juris doctor from Boston College Law School in 1988.

== Legal career ==
Longietti previously clerked for the president judge of the Court of Common Pleas of Mercer County, Pennsylvania. He began practicing law in 1989, specializing in municipal law. Longietti served as solicitor for Mercer County, Sharon City School District, Sharpsville Area School District, Reynolds School District, Findley Township, and Delaware Township.

== Political career ==
Longietti was first elected to the Pennsylvania State Democratic Committee in 1994. He attended the 1996, 2000, and 2004 Democratic National Convention as both a delegate and an alternate delegate.

In 2006, Longietti was elected to the Pennsylvania House of Representatives, representing the 7th District. He was continuously reelected until retiring in 2022. During his tenure, Longietti served as ranking member on the House Education Committee.

Following his retirement from the State House, Longietti was hired by the city of Hermitage in a newly-created position as director of business and community development.

== Electoral history ==
2006 Pennsylvania House of Representatives election, District 7
| Party | Candidate | Votes | % |
|---|---|---|---|
| Democratic/Republican | Mark Longietti | 17,756 | 99.52 |
| Write-in | | 85 | 0.48 |
| Total votes | | 17,841 | 100.00 |

2008 Pennsylvania House of Representatives election, District 7
| Party | Candidate | Votes | % |
|---|---|---|---|
| Democratic/Republican | Mark Longietti (incumbent) | 25,941 | 99.49 |
| Write-in | | 133 | 0.51 |
| Total votes | | 26,074 | 100.00 |

2010 Pennsylvania House of Representatives election, District 7
| Party | Candidate | Votes | % |
|---|---|---|---|
| Democratic/Republican | Mark Longietti (incumbent) | 16,884 | 99.49 |
| Write-in | | 86 | 0.51 |
| Total votes | | 16,970 | 100.00 |

2012 Pennsylvania House of Representatives election, District 7
| Party | Candidate | Votes | % |
|---|---|---|---|
| Democratic/Republican | Mark Longietti (incumbent) | 24,586 | 99.48 |
| Write-in | | 128 | 0.52 |
| Total votes | | 24,714 | 100.00 |

2014 Pennsylvania House of Representatives election, District 7
| Party | Candidate | Votes | % |
|---|---|---|---|
| Democratic/Republican | Mark Longietti (incumbent) | 14,930 | 99.24 |
| Write-in | | 114 | 0.76 |
| Total votes | | 15,044 | 100.00 |

2016 Pennsylvania House of Representatives election, District 7
| Party | Candidate | Votes | % |
|---|---|---|---|
| Democratic/Republican | Mark Longietti (incumbent) | 27,497 | 99.55 |
| Write-in | | 125 | 0.45 |
| Total votes | | 27,622 | 100.00 |

2018 Pennsylvania House of Representatives election, District 7
| Party | Candidate | Votes | % |
|---|---|---|---|
| Democratic/Republican | Mark Longietti (incumbent) | 21,573 | 99.32 |
| Write-in | | 147 | 0.68 |
| Total votes | | 21,720 | 100.00 |

2020 Pennsylvania House of Representatives election, District 7
| Party | Candidate | Votes | % |
|---|---|---|---|
| Democratic/Republican | Mark Longietti (incumbent) | 28,282 | 97.84 |
| Write-in | | 625 | 2.16 |
| Total votes | | 28,907 | 100.00 |
