= Hermitage School District (Pennsylvania) =

School district in Pennsylvania

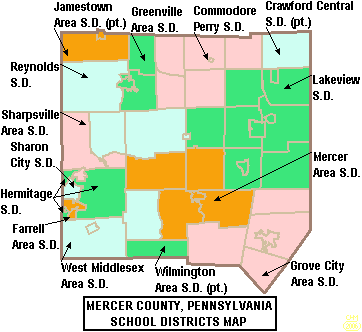

Address
- 411 N Hermitage Road Hermitage, Mercer County, Pennsylvania, 16148-3316; United States

District information
- Type: Public

Other information
- Website: hermitagesd.net

Hickory High School

Location
- 640 North Hermitage Road; Hermitage, (Mercer County), Pennsylvania 16148; United States; 41.242126°N 80.446594°W

Information
- Type: Public high school
- Principal: Vincent D'Angelo (Grades 8-10); Chris Gill (Grades 11-12)
- Staff: 63.15 (FTE)
- Enrollment: 789 (2023-24)
- Student to teacher ratio: 12.49
- Colors: Black and red
- Nickname: Hornets
- Website: Hickory High School

The Hermitage School District is a small, suburban/urban, public school district serving parts of Mercer County, Pennsylvania. It incorporates the city of Hermitage, Pennsylvania, a former township that has transitioned into city status. The district is made up of three discontinuous pieces that surround Farrell Area School District and Sharon City School District. Hermitage School District encompasses approximately 29 square miles (75 km^{2}). According to 2010 federal census data, it served a resident population of 16,220. By 2010, the district's population declined to 16,209 people.

According to the Pennsylvania Budget and Policy Center, 31.6% of the district's pupils lived at 185% or below the Federal Poverty level as shown by their eligibility for the federal free or reduced price school meal programs in 2012. In 2009, the district residents’ mean per capita income was US$23,227, while the median family income was $46,994. In Mercer County, the median household income was $42,573. In the Commonwealth, the median family income was $49,501 and the United States median family income was $49,445, in 2010. By 2013, the median household income in the United States rose to $52,100.

The Hermitage School District operates Karen A. Ionta Elementary School, Artman Elementary School, Delahunty Middle School, and Hickory High School. The district is one of the 500 public school districts of Pennsylvania. Hickory High School students have access to Mercer County Career Center programs and services. The Midwestern Intermediate Unit IU4 provides the district with a variety of services, like specialized education for disabled students, hearing, speech and visual disability services and professional development for staff and faculty.

== Extracurricular activities ==
The district offers a wide variety of clubs, activities and an extensive sports program.

=== Sports ===
The district funds:

Boys

- Baseball – AA
- Basketball – AAA
- Cross Country – AA
- Football – AA
- Golf – AA
- Indoor Track and Field – AAAA
- Soccer – AA
- Swimming and Diving – AA
- Tennis – AA
- Track and Field – AA
- Wrestling – AA

Girls

- Basketball – AA
- Cross Country – AA
- Golf – AA
- Indoor Track and Field – AAAA
- Soccer (Fall) – AA
- Softball – AAA
- Swimming and Diving – AA
- Girls' Tennis – AA
- Track and Field – AAA
- Volleyball – AA

Middle School Sports

Boys

- Basketball
- Cross Country
- Football
- Soccer
- Track and Field
- Wrestling

Girls

- Basketball
- Cross Country
- Soccer (Fall)
- Track and Field
- Volleyball

According to PIAA directory July 2013

== Notable alumni ==
- Andre Coleman (1990), former NFL wide receiver
- Sean Rowe (1993), Presiding Bishop of the Episcopal Church of America
- Rod White (1995), Olympic gold medal winning archer

== Free speech court case ==
Hermitage School District was party to a student discipline case which was appealed by the American Civil Liberties Union (ACLU) to the Supreme Court of the United States. Known as Layshock v. Hermitage School District, the district lost the case when the Supreme Court refused to review it. An earlier court ruled the student's actions were protected by free speech rights. The student, Justin Layshock, received $10,000 in damages plus legal fees.
