= Layshock v. Hermitage School District =

- Court: United States Court of Appeals for the Third Circuit
- Full case name: Layshock v. Hermitage School District
- Argued: December 10 2008
- Decided: February 4 2010
- Citation: 593 F.3d 249

Case history
- Procedural history: Affirmed decision for the plaintiff from 412 F.Supp.2d 502 (W.D. Pa. 2006)

Holding
- The defendants violated the plaintiff's First Amendment free speech rights.

Case opinions
- Majority: Theodore McKee

Laws applied
- First Amendment to the United States Constitution

Layshock v. Hermitage School District, 593 F.3d 249 (2010), was a freedom of speech case of the United States Court of Appeals for the Third Circuit concerning the online speech of a public school student. The appeals court affirmed the decision of the district court that the student's suspension for parodying his principal online was unconstitutional.

== Background ==
In December 2005 Justin Layshock, then a senior at Hickory High School in the Hermitage, Pennsylvania school district, created a false MySpace profile in his principal Eric Trosch's name, designed to look like it was created by the principal himself. On that page Layshock mocked the man's personal appearance and implied that he had substance abuse issues. The parody profile quickly gained popularity among the school's students, and word of its existence eventually reached Trosch, who found it "degrading", "demeaning", "demoralizing", and "shocking". Trosch inquired with local police about having Layshock arrested for harassment and reputational damage.

Layshock was suspended from school, sent to an alternative education program, and told that he would be prohibited from attending his graduation the following spring. The school later allowed Layschock to attend graduation but left the suspension on his record.

Layshock's parents sued the school district under the United States civil code, claiming that his suspension was a retaliation for his speech and therefore a violation of his First Amendment rights. The parents also claimed that while precedents like Tinker v. Des Moines Independent Community School District affirmed that public school officials could restrict some student speech if it disrupted the education process, Layshock's speech did not fall under such precedents because it was conducted online, after school hours, and outside the physical boundaries of the school.

In 2007, the district court ruled that the suspension violated Layshock's constitutional rights and sent the matter to a jury to determine compensatory damages. The school district appealed this decision to the Third Circuit.

== Opinion ==
The Third Circuit set out to determine if a school district can punish a student for expressive conduct that originated outside of the classroom, when that conduct did not disturb the school environment and was not related to any school sponsored event. The court applied the Tinker precedent from 1969, in which the U.S. Supreme Court ruled that student expression may not be suppressed unless school officials reasonably conclude that it will "materially and substantially disrupt the work and discipline of the school." The court also applied Morse v. Frederick from 2007, in which the Supreme Court ruled that public schools could restrict student speech that takes place outside of school grounds, but only at official school-sanctioned events.

Hermitage School District claimed to have authority over Layshock's actions because he had occasionally used the school computer network to access his fake MySpace profile of Trosch. The circuit court rejected this reasoning per Thomas v. Board of Education in which the Second Circuit ruled that information may be stored on school grounds or in school facilities, but the school has no authority over the expression of that information if the expression takes place outside of school grounds.

Ultimately, the Third Circuit ruled that Hermitage School District could not punish Layshock for his off-campus speech simply because that speech reached inside the school via computer networks. The fact that Layschock's speech was arguably vulgar was ruled irrelevant per J.S. v. Bethlehem Area School District and related precedents because Layshock made no threats and did not advocate violence. Thus Layshock's suspension by the school district was ruled unconstitutional, affirming the district court ruling. The suspension was stricken from Layshock's permanent record. The school district ultimately paid Layschock and his parents $15,000 in damages and $506,500 in attorneys' fees.

== Impact ==
Layshock v. Hermitage School District has been named as an important free speech precedent as the courts navigated the uncertainty of the early Internet and the extent of protected speech for public school students. However, the matter of student speech that originates outside of school grounds, but then possibly disrupts the educational experience when it reaches other students inside the school, was left vague and unsettled. Such confusion can be seen in the contradictory ruling by the Fourth Circuit in Kowalski v. Berkeley County Schools. That contradiction was partially, but not completely, resolved by the U.S. Supreme Court in 2021 in Mahanoy Area School District v. B.L.
