= Leonard Greenspoon =

American biblical scholar (1945–2025)

Leonard J. Greenspoon
- Born: December 5, 1945; Richmond, Virginia
- Died: May 22, 2025 (aged 79)
- Occupations: Biblical scholar, professor
- Organizations: Clemson University; Creighton University
- Known for: Septuagint studies; Bible translation; Jewish civilization

Academic background
- Education: University of Richmond; Harvard University

Academic work
- Notable works: Textual Studies in the Book of Joshua (1983); biography of Max Leopold Margolis

Leonard Jay Greenspoon (December 5, 1945 – May 22, 2025) was an American scholar of biblical studies whose research included the Septuagint, Bible translation, and Jewish civilization. He was for many years the Philip M. and Ethel Klutznick Chair in Jewish Civilization at Creighton University and a longtime contributor to Biblical Archaeology Review.

== Early life and education ==
Greenspoon was born in 1945 in Richmond, Virginia. His father was a Ukrainian Jewish immigrant, and his mother was an American Jew from Richmond. He earned both his bachelor’s and master’s degrees in classical studies at the University of Richmond, where he specialized in Greek and Latin. His master’s thesis examined the political activities of Philo. Initially beginning doctoral studies in Classics at Harvard University, he shifted to biblical and ancient Near Eastern studies, studying under George Ernest Wright and Frank Moore Cross. His Ph.D. dissertation was completed in 1977 and later published as Textual Studies in the Book of Joshua (1983).

== Academic career ==
From 1975 to 1996, Greenspoon was on the faculty of Clemson University. In 1996, he joined Creighton University as the Klutznick Chair in Jewish Civilization, as well as professor of theology and of classical and Near Eastern studies. In this role he organized annual symposia that produced more than 25 edited scholarly volumes.

Greenspoon specialized in Septuagint studies and contributed to a new English translation of the Septuagint. From 1993 to 1999 he was president of the International Organization for Septuagint and Cognate Studies. His other research topics included Bible translations in general, Jewish history and culture, the Dead Sea Scrolls, the Holocaust, and Jewish humor. Over his career, he published more than 200 articles and book chapters, as well as several monographs and edited collections.

== Writings for general audiences ==
Greenspoon wrote regularly for general audiences, including contributions to Bible Review and later Biblical Archaeology Review, where his column "The Bible in the News" ran from 2001 to 2016. This column discussed biblical themes as they appeared in contemporary media and scholarship.

In a 1989 Bible Review article, "Mission to Alexandria," Greenspoon summarized scholarly debates about the origins of the Septuagint for a general readership. He also wrote about humor and religion, as well as food and Judaism.

== Honors and recognition ==
In 2018, colleagues published a Festschrift in his honor, Found in Translation: Essays on Jewish Translation in Honor of Leonard J. Greenspoon (Purdue University Press).

In 2020, he received Creighton University’s Research Award.

== Personal life and death ==
Greenspoon was married to Ellie Greenspoon for 55 years. They had two daughters, Galit and Talya, and three grandchildren. He died on May 22, 2025, at the age of 79.

== Selected works ==
- Textual Studies in the Book of Joshua (Scholars Press, 1983).
- Max Leopold Margolis: A Scholar's Scholar (Scholars Press, 1987).
- The Bible in the News: How the Popular Press Relates, Conflates and Updates Sacred Writ (Biblical Archaeology Society, 2012).
- Jewish Bible Translations: Personalities, Passions, Politics, Progress (Jewish Publication Society, 2020).
