= Pennsylvania House of Representatives, District 7 =

American legislative district

Pennsylvania's 7th State House of Representatives district
Representative
Parke Wentling; R–Greenville
- Population (2022): 65,917

The Pennsylvania House of Representatives District 7 is located in western Pennsylvania and has been represented by Republican Parke Wentling since 2023.

== District profile ==
The 7th Pennsylvania House of Representatives District is located in Mercer County and includes the following areas:

- Clark
- Farrell
- Greene Township
- Greenville
- Hempfield Township
- Hermitage
- Jamestown
- Lackawannock Township
- Pymatuning Township
- Sharon
- Sharpsville
- Shenango Township
- South Pymatuning Township
- West Middlesex
- West Salem Township
- Wheatland

== Representatives ==
Representative	Party	Years	District home	Notes
Prior to 1967, seats were apportioned by county.
Reid L. Bennett	Democrat	1967 – 1980	Sharpsville	Moved from the 2nd Mercer County District.
Michael Gruitza	Democrat	1981 – 2006	Hermitage	
Mark Longietti	Democrat	2007 – 2022	Farrell	
Parke Wentling	Republican	2023 – present	Greenville	Redistricted from 17th district.

== Recent election results ==
PA House election, 2024: Pennsylvania House, District 7
Party	Candidate	Votes	%
Republican	Parke Wentling (incumbent)	Unopposed	
Total votes		25,583	100.00
Republican hold			

PA House election, 2022: Pennsylvania House, District 7
Party	Candidate	Votes	%
Republican	Parke Wentling (incumbent)	13,559	51.40
Democratic	Timothy McGonigle	12,818	48.60
Total votes		26,377	100.00
Republican gain from Democratic			

PA House election, 2020: Pennsylvania House, District 7
Party	Candidate	Votes	%
Democratic	Mark Longietti (incumbent)	Unopposed	
Total votes		28,297	100.00
Democratic hold			

PA House election, 2018: Pennsylvania House, District 7
Party	Candidate	Votes	%
Democratic	Mark Longietti (incumbent)	Unopposed	
Total votes		21,573	100.00
Democratic hold			

PA House election, 2016: Pennsylvania House, District 7
Party	Candidate	Votes	%
Democratic	Mark Longietti (incumbent)	Unopposed	
Total votes		27,497	100.00
Democratic hold			

PA House election, 2014: Pennsylvania House, District 7
Party	Candidate	Votes	%
Democratic	Mark Longietti (incumbent)	Unopposed	
Total votes		14,930	100.00
Democratic hold			

PA House election, 2012: Pennsylvania House, District 7
Party	Candidate	Votes	%
Democratic	Mark Longietti (incumbent)	Unopposed	
Total votes		24,586	100.00
Democratic hold			

PA House election, 2010: Pennsylvania House, District 7
Party	Candidate	Votes	%
Democratic	Mark Longietti (incumbent)	Unopposed	
Total votes		16,884	100.00
Democratic hold			
