= The Bible: A History =

2003 illustrated reference book by Stephen M. Miller and Robert V. Huber

- Authors: Stephen M. Miller; Robert V. Huber
- Language: English
- Subject: History of the Bible
- Genre: Reference
- Publisher: Lion Publishing
- Publication date: March 2003
- Publication place: United Kingdom
- Media type: Print (hardback)
- Pages: 256
- ISBN: 978-0-7459-5072-3
- OCLC: 57167854

The Bible: A History — The Making and Impact of the Bible is a 2003 illustrated reference book by American authors Stephen M. Miller and Robert V. Huber. It traces how the Bible was written, copied, translated, and used over roughly 2,000 years, and how it has shaped art, politics, and culture. The book was published in hardback by Lion Publishing in the United Kingdom in March 2003. A United States edition was issued the following year by Good Books, an imprint of Skyhorse Publishing. The book has been translated into eight languages.

The book is built from two-page topical spreads that combine text with photographs, artwork, maps, and charts. It does not summarize the contents of the Bible itself. Instead, it focuses on how the Bible came to be, how it has been interpreted, and how it has influenced the wider world.

== Content ==
The Bible: A History is organized into five sections, covering the Old and New Testaments, the period from the 4th to the 14th centuries, the Reformation and its legacy, and the modern era. Each subject is treated in a two-page spread that pairs the main text with sidebars, illustrations, maps, and timelines.

The book includes profiles of figures involved in the writing and interpretation of the Bible, among them Moses, Ezra, Philo, Paul, Jerome, Augustine, Francis of Assisi, Martin Luther, and twentieth-century liberation and feminist theologians. It follows the development of writing from cuneiform and hieroglyphs to the alphabet, and traces the production of biblical texts on papyrus and parchment scrolls, in medieval manuscripts, through the printing press, and into digital formats.

Other sections cover translation, from the Septuagint through modern English versions; the spread of Christianity; the formation of the biblical canon; and the Bible's relationship to topics including slavery, sexism, and abortion. The book also discusses modern methods of biblical interpretation and the use of the Bible in film, poetry, fiction, drama, and visual art.

== Reception ==
Writing in Reform in June 2003, the reviewer signed "DB" called the book "a beautifully illustrated and thoroughly researched book" in "the best traditions of Lion Publishing." The review described the style as "lucid, lively" and noted that the book "does not attempt to help readers grasp the contents of the Bible" but rather "helps them to understand the vital role the Bible has played in history over the past 2000 years." The review concluded that "any serious student of the Bible will want this on their bookshelves."

Charlie Murray, reviewing the book for Library Journal in March 2004, said it filled "a gap left by the more academic, and thus more narrowly focused, histories of Israel and New Testament times." He called it "an excellent resource… packed with up-to-date scholarly information, presented in a style that is accessible to the informed general reader," and praised the illustrations as readily identifiable and helpful in clarifying the text. Murray highly recommended the book, especially for public libraries.

John Pare, reviewing the book for the theological journal Anvil in August 2004, called it "an attractively produced book" and praised its introductions to debates over the canon, translation, and interpretation. Pare noted that "a work of this scope is broad-brush and selective" and questioned where the book leaves its readers, writing that "however much the consistency and survival of the Bible bear witness to the faithfulness of God, the impact of the Bible tells us a lot about the often competing interests and beliefs of its readers."

Leonard J. Greenspoon, writing in Religious Studies Review in October 2004, was strongly enthusiastic, opening his review with the claim that "page for page, word for word, picture for picture, and, yes, dollar for dollar… there is, simply put, nothing like this book." He praised the breadth of coverage, "from the oral tradition to 'The Bible in Moving Images,'" and singled out chapter topics such as "Unflattering History," "The 'Almost' Scriptures," "The Bible and Slavery," and "Using and Abusing the Bible." He noted that the book included full-color illustrations of works "rarely illustrated" elsewhere, and reported from classroom use that it was "accessible to students and virtually error-free." Greenspoon concluded that it was "a volume to own, to recommend to libraries, and to give (as I have done) as a gift."

Publishers Weekly, in a November 2004 review, described the volume as one that aims to introduce readers to "the remarkable story" of how the Bible came to be and changed the world. The review noted that Miller, a Protestant, and Huber, a Catholic, "make a sincere effort to present an ecumenical narrative using a variety of academic approaches," and that topics such as the Bible's relation to slavery, sexism, and abortion are "handled in a broadminded way." The reviewer criticized what was described as the book's reliance on a "faith-based understanding" of the Bible's history and its treatment of church history, but concluded that readers "looking for an accessible introduction to the composition and transmission of the Bible will find the bulk of this book edifying."

Reviewing the 2015 Lion UK reissue for Library Journal in January 2016, Graham Christian described the book as "a direct, easy-to-read compendium of current knowledge about Christian Scriptures," covering the development of the Hebrew Scriptures and Christian Gospels, the history of the canon, medieval and later reception, translation, and the Bible's spread outside Europe. He observed, however, that the work "reads like a long encyclopedia entry and doesn't engage with the trickier points of authorship, historiography, or theology." His verdict was that it was "a respectable, useful, nonpartisan account of Christian Scripture… a useful summary and solid first text on the Bible; suitable for public libraries."

== Publication history ==
The book was first published in hardback by Lion Publishing in the United Kingdom in March 2003. A United States edition followed in 2004 from Good Books of Intercourse, Pennsylvania. Lion also issued a condensed version under the title The One-Stop History of the Bible.

The book has been translated into the following languages:

- Arabic: Dar El Thaqafa, 2008. ISBN 9-7721-3826-3.
- Chinese (Simplified): 圣经的历史, translated by Huang Jianbo and Wen Juhong. Beijing: Central Compilation and Translation Press, 2008. ISBN 978-7-8021-1661-0.
- Dutch: De geschiedenis van de Bijbel. Kampen: Uitgeverij Kok, 2004. ISBN 978-9-0435-0928-2
- German: Die Bibel. Stuttgart: Kreuz Verlag, 2004. ISBN 3-7831-2398-4.
- Hungarian: A Biblia története. Budapest: Kálvin Kiadó, 2004. ISBN 9-6330-0971-5.
- Polish: Historia Biblii, translated by Ewa Czerwińska. Warsaw: Oficyna Wydawnicza Vocatio, 2005. ISBN 8-3714-6124-0.
- Portuguese (Brazilian): A Bíblia e sua história — o surgimento e o impacto da Bíblia, translated by Magda D. Z. Hof and Fernando H. Hof. Barueri, SP: Sociedade Bíblica do Brasil, 2006. ISBN 978-8-5311-0890-7.
- Slovak: História Biblie: Vznik Biblie a jej vplyv na dejiny ľudstva, translated by Jana Šlopeková and Jana Jurčová. Banská Bystrica: Slovenská biblická spoločnosť, 2006. ISBN 8-0854-8641-5.
