= Hermitage, Pennsylvania =

City in Pennsylvania, US

- City
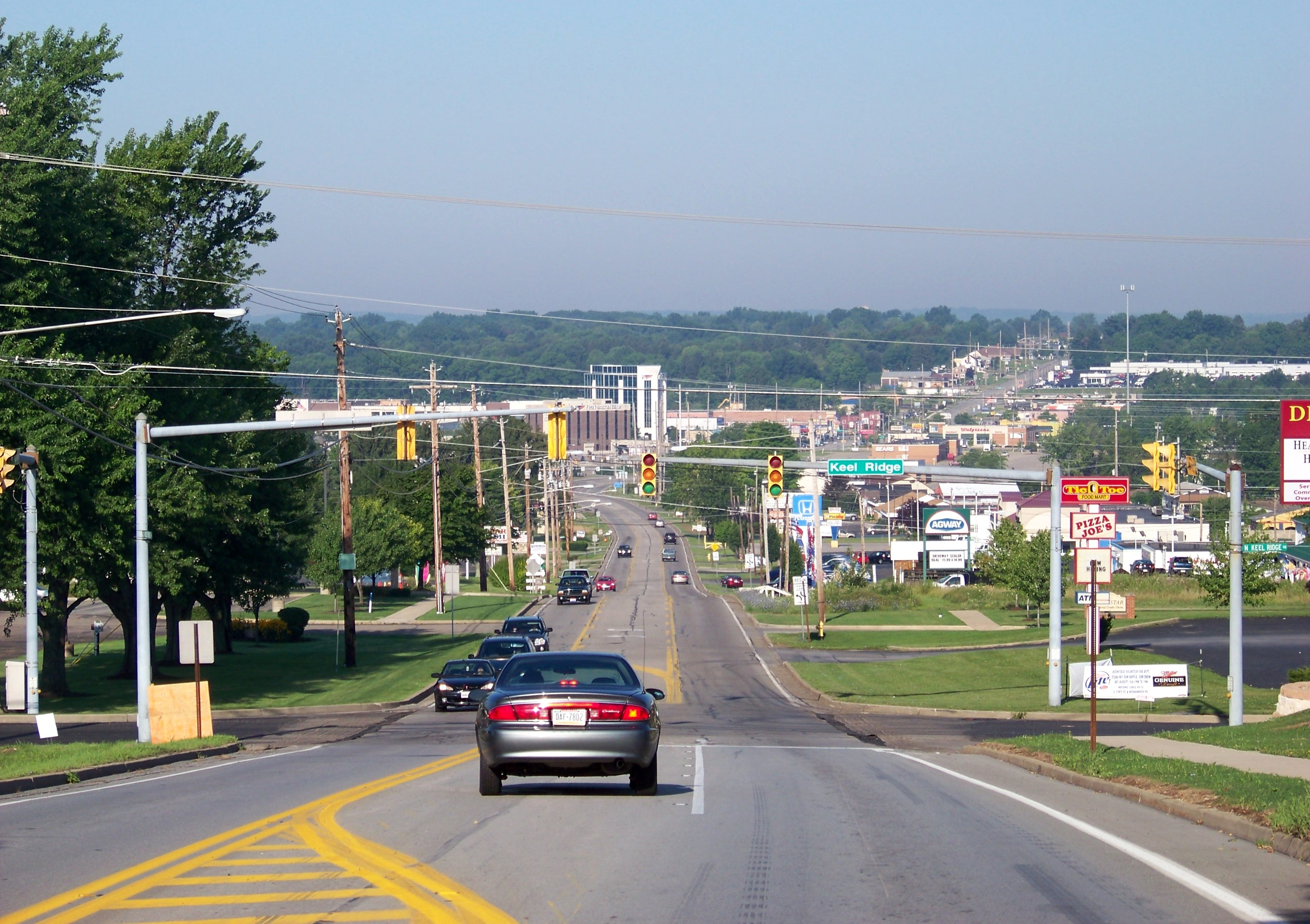
- Entering town from the east

- Flag Seal

- Location of Hermitage in Mercer County, Pennsylvania

- Location within Pennsylvania Location within the United States
- Coordinates: 41.23250°N 80.46056°W
- Country: United States
- State: Pennsylvania
- County: Mercer
- Established: 1796

Area
  - Total: 29.56 sq mi (76.56 km^{2})
  - Land: 29.46 sq mi (76.30 km^{2})
  - Water: 0.10 sq mi (0.26 km^{2})

Population (2020)
  - Total: 16,230
  - Density: 550.9/sq mi (212.71/km^{2})
- Time zone: UTC-5 (EST)
  - Summer (DST): UTC-4 (EDT)
- Zip code: 16148
- Area code: 724
- FIPS code: 42-34064
- Website: www.hermitage.net

Hermitage is a city in western Mercer County, Pennsylvania, United States. The population was 16,230 at the 2020 census, making it the largest city in Mercer County. It is located about 15 miles (24 km) northeast of Youngstown and about 60 miles (97 km) northwest of Pittsburgh. It is the principal city of the Hermitage micropolitan area, which includes all of Mercer County.

== History ==
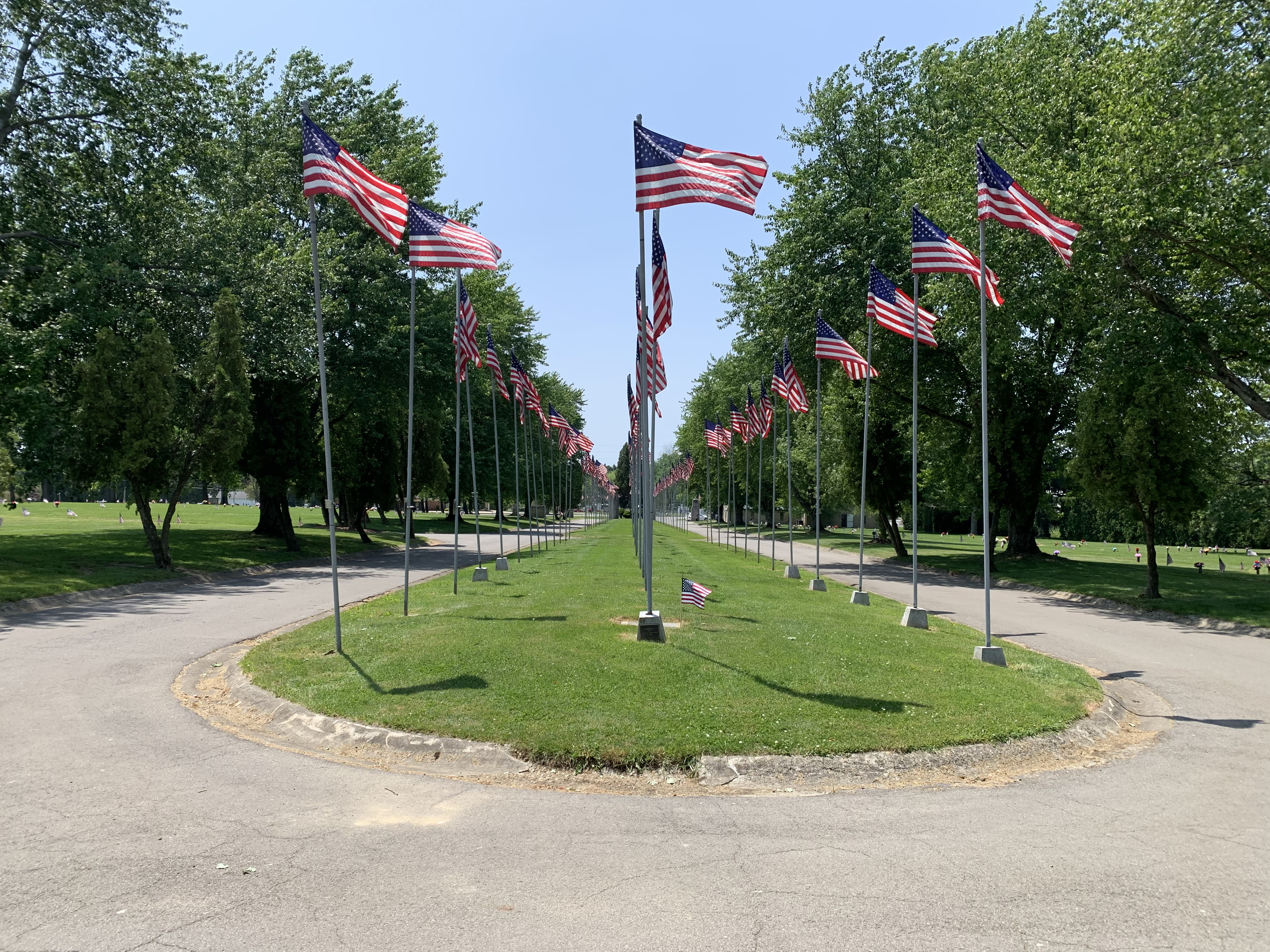
Avenue of Flags commemorates victims of the Iran Hostage Crisis.

Hermitage was first settled in 1796 and incorporated in 1832 as Hickory Township from portions of the Shenango and Pymatuning townships. Following the incorporation of the cities of Sharon and Farrell and the boroughs of Sharpsville and Wheatland, the remainder of the Township was incorporated into a first class township.

The Home Rule Charter and Optional Plans Law was passed in 1972, allowing for municipalities to establish their own home rule charters. A home rule charter in Hickory Township was approved on May 21, 1974, by a vote of 1,375 to 546, and was to become effective on January 1, 1976. The name Hermitage was selected in the November 1975 election, over alternatives "Mount Hickory" and "Hickory Hills", following a campaign by the Board of Commissioners. On November 8, 1983, voters approved by a margin of 1971 to 1846 to reclassify the Township of Hermitage to a city. Hermitage became a third class city on January 1, 1984.

On May 31, 1985, Hermitage was struck by an F5 tornado that killed 18 people and injured 310. It was the strongest tornado ever recorded in Pennsylvania. On May 31, 2015, the 30th anniversary of the F5, an EF0 tornado touched down in the southern part of town. It flipped two cars, damaged the canopy at a Sheetz gas station and downed a few trees and branches.

In 2004, local politicians proposed the creation of "Shenango Valley City", a municipality from the merger of Hermitage with Farrell, Sharpsville, Sharon, and Wheatland, with the issue being put on the ballot in the form of a referendum. Then-governor of Pennsylvania Ed Rendell voiced support for the measure and would be joined by Kathleen McGinty, secretary of the Pennsylvania Department of Environmental Protection, and Dennis Yablonsky, secretary of the Pennsylvania Department of Community and Economic Development, with the trio touring the region to urge for voters to pass the motion. The city would largely be an expansion of Hermitage, whose city government would be retained, including the office of mayor and its nine-member city council. The merger would have kept the various independent school districts intact. The effort would ultimately be defeated, and via the ordinance, the issue of merger could not be brought up again until 2009.

The neighboring borough of Wheatland merged into Hermitage on January 1, 2024.

== Geography ==
According to the United States Census Bureau, the city has a total area of 29.6 square miles (77 km^{2}), of which 29.5 square miles (76 km^{2}) is land and 0.1 square miles (0.26 km^{2}) (0.37%) is water. Based on area, Hermitage is the third largest city in Pennsylvania.

The Shenango River Lake north of Hermitage is run by the US Army Corps of Engineers.

== Demographics ==
Historical population
Census	Pop.	Note	%±
1880	49		—
1920	4,569		—
1930	3,984		−12.8%
1940	4,295		7.8%
1950	6,725		56.6%
1960	12,635		87.9%
1970	15,399		21.9%
1980	16,365		6.3%
1990	15,300		−6.5%
2000	16,157		5.6%
2010	16,220		0.4%
2020	16,230		0.1%

=== 2020 census ===
As of the 2020 census, Hermitage had a population of 16,230. The median age was 49.9 years. 18.0% of residents were under the age of 18 and 28.1% of residents were 65 years of age or older. For every 100 females there were 88.7 males, and for every 100 females age 18 and over there were 86.6 males age 18 and over.

80.0% of residents lived in urban areas, while 20.0% lived in rural areas.

Racial composition as of the 2020 census
Race	Number	Percent
White	14,403	88.7%
Black or African American	801	4.9%
American Indian and Alaska Native	26	0.2%
Asian	217	1.3%
Native Hawaiian and Other Pacific Islander	8	0.0%
Some other race	102	0.6%
Two or more races	673	4.1%
Hispanic or Latino (of any race)	218	1.3%

There were 7,290 households in Hermitage, of which 22.2% had children under the age of 18 living in them. Of all households, 45.7% were married-couple households, 17.1% were households with a male householder and no spouse or partner present, and 31.5% were households with a female householder and no spouse or partner present. About 34.6% of all households were made up of individuals and 20.1% had someone living alone who was 65 years of age or older.

There were 7,849 housing units, of which 7.1% were vacant. The homeowner vacancy rate was 2.2% and the rental vacancy rate was 8.0%.

=== 2000 census ===
As of the 2000 census, there were 16,157 people, 6,809 households, and 4,616 families residing in the city. The population density was 548.3 inhabitants per square mile (211.7/km^{2}). There were 7,104 housing units at an average density of 241.1 per square mile (93.1/km^{2}). The racial makeup of the city was 94.97% White, 3.09% African American, 0.04% Native American, 0.80% Asian, 0.01% Pacific Islander, 0.23% from other races, and 0.85% from two or more races. Hispanic or Latino people of any race were 0.66% of the population.

There were 6,809 households, out of which 26.4% had children under the age of 18 living with them, 54.9% were married couples living together, 10.2% had a female householder with no husband present, and 32.2% were non-families. 29.4% of all households were made up of individuals, and 15.7% had someone living alone who was 65 years of age or older. The average household size was 2.32 and the average family size was 2.87.

In the city, the population was spread out, with 21.7% under the age of 18, 5.5% from 18 to 24, 24.6% from 25 to 44, 24.7% from 45 to 64, and 23.6% who were 65 years of age or older. The median age was 44 years. For every 100 females, there were 87.9 males. For every 100 females age 18 and over, there were 83.4 males.

The median income for a household in the city was $39,454, and the median income for a family was $46,994. Males had a median income of $41,506 versus $25,217 for females. The per capita income for the city was $23,227. About 6.3% of families and 8.2% of the population were below the poverty line, including 12.1% of those under age 18 and 6.5% of those age 65 or over.

== Education ==
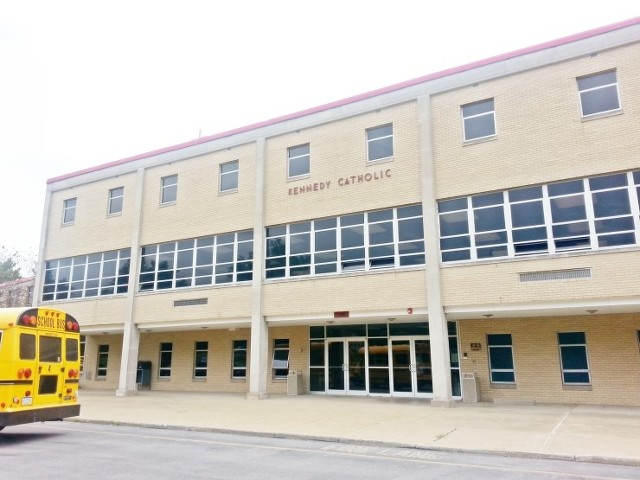
Kennedy Catholic High School

Hermitage is served by the public Hermitage School District, which includes Karen A. Ionta Elementary School, Artman Elementary School, Delahunty Middle School, and Hickory High School. The city is also served by the private Kennedy Catholic High School under the Roman Catholic Diocese of Erie.

== Media ==
Hermitage is covered by the six-day daily newspaper The Herald of adjacent Sharon, Pennsylvania.

Because of Hermitage's location near the Pennsylvania/Ohio border, it is served by WKBN-TV (CBS), WFMJ-TV (NBC), WYTV (ABC), WYFX-LD (Fox) and WBCB (CW), all broadcast from nearby Youngstown, Ohio.

Hermitage is served by AM radio stations such as WLOA (1470 AM) (Farrell, PA), WPIC (790 AM) (Sharon, PA), WKBN (570 AM) (Youngstown, OH) and FM radio stations such as WYFM/"Y-103" (102.9 FM), WLLF/"The River" (96.7 FM) (Mercer, PA), WYLE/"Willie 95.1" (95.1 FM) (Grove City, PA), WMXY/"Mix 98.9" (98.9 FM) (Youngstown, OH).

== Tourism ==
- Avenue of Flags – includes a War on Terror Memorial
- Buhl Farm Golf Course

== Notable people ==
- Sincere Carry, college basketball player for the Kent State Golden Flashes
- Andre Coleman, former National Football League wide receiver and kick returner
- Michael Gruitza, former member of the Pennsylvania House of Representatives from the 7th district
- Jon Kolb, former National Football League offensive tackle and center
- Mark Longietti, former member of the Pennsylvania House of Representatives from the 7th district
- Sean Rowe, Presiding Bishop of the Episcopal Church of America
- Rob Spon, professional basketball coach
- Rod White, former gold-medal US Olympic Team archer

== International relations ==
Hermitage is twinned with:

- Žipov, Slovakia

== See also ==
- Buhl Farm Golf Course
