= Temple Beth Israel (Sharon, Pennsylvania) =

Reform Jewish synagogue in Sharon, Pennsylvania, US

- Location of the former synagogue in Pennsylvania

Religion
- Affiliation: Judaism (1888–2013): Orthodox (1888–c. 1940); Conservative (c. 1940–1945); Reform (1945–2013); Christianity (since 2014)
- Ecclesiastical or organizational status: Synagogue (1888–2013); Church (since 2014)
- Ownership: Greater New and Living Way Temple of the Apostolic Faith
- Status: Closed as a synagogue (2013); merged with Congregation Rodef Sholom of Youngstown, Ohio

Location
- Location: 840 Highland Road, Sharon, Pennsylvania
- Country: United States
- Interactive map of Temple Beth Israel
- Coordinates: 41°14′20″N 80°29′38″W

Architecture
- Established: 1888 (as a congregation)
- Completed: 1903 (first synagogue); 1950 (Highland Road)

Temple Beth Israel was a Jewish synagogue located at 840 Highland Road in Sharon, Pennsylvania, in the United States. Originally called House of Israel Congregation, it was founded in 1888 as an Orthodox congregation by Eastern European Jews. The congregation merged with Congregation Rodef Sholom of Youngstown, Ohio in July, 2013; and the former synagogue building was sold to a Christian church in 2014.

== Early history ==
Eastern European Jews first settled in Sharon in the 1880s. In August, 1888 they founded the Orthodox Temple Beth Israel (originally called House of Israel Congregation) so that they would have place to worship for Rosh Hashanah the following month. J.M. Rabinowitz (or Rabinovitz) served as cantor, ritual circumciser, Hebrew teacher, and ritual slaughterer.

Services were initially held on the second floor of 62 Shenango Street. The first permanent synagogue building was constructed in 1903. By 1907 the synagogue had 40 member families, and its annual revenues were $1,000 (today $34,600). Services were held on Shabbat and the Jewish holidays. The congregational school had two teachers and 25 students. A dissenting group who wanted more traditional services formed the Shaarah Torah synagogue. A number of years later Shaarah Torah re-merged with Beth Israel.

A new sanctuary was added to the building in 1924, in time for High Holy Days that year. Beth Israel's first full-time rabbi, Maurice Moskowitz, was hired in 1929. He served until 1934, and was succeeded that year by Aaron Shapiro, who served until 1936. Shapiro was succeeded by Meyer Finkelstein, who served until 1937, and then by Harry Seeve, who served from 1937 to 1941.

Sidney Riback joined as rabbi in 1941; by this time the synagogue had moved to Conservative Judaism. By 1942 there were approximately 140 Jewish families in Sharon, and the women of House of Israel had formed a sisterhood.

== Move to Reform ==
The members voted to reform services in 1945, and hired a new rabbi, M. Robert Syme. Born in 1920 in Winnipeg, Manitoba, he was a graduate of the Jewish Institute of Religion. When he arrived in Sharon, it had a Jewish population of approximately 150 families, and Beth Israel was its only synagogue.

Syme changed synagogue ritual, adopted the Union Prayer Book, and added a choir and organ. These changes were resisted by some members. Syme also discovered that Sharon's Orthodox Jewish population was sharing space with Beth Israel's congregation, worshiping in the basement. He felt it important that the Orthodox Jews be able to pray in the sanctuary too; so, on Friday nights he followed the Reform service in the Union Prayer Book, using an organ, while on Saturday mornings he followed the services from an Orthodox siddur (prayer book), praying without an organ. (Orthodox services normally do not use musical instruments, since the playing of musical instruments on Shabbat and many holidays are forbidden by Jewish law.) While living in Sharon, Syme also walked to synagogue and kept a kosher home, in accordance with Jewish law, to show that he was the rabbi of all of Sharon's Jews.

Looking for the greater challenge, opportunity, and money a larger congregation could provide, Syme eventually resigned in 1948, moving to Temple B'nai Abraham of Butler, Pennsylvania. Syme would become better known as rabbi of Detroit's Temple Israel, where he served for almost 47 years, starting in 1953.

== Events since 1948 ==
Syme was succeeded in 1948 by Meyer M. Abramowitz. Born in Rochester, New York in 1918, Abramowitz had an unusual educational background; he was a graduate of the Orthodox Hebrew Theological College, Columbia University and the Conservative Jewish Theological Seminary of America (both in 1943), and the Reform Jewish Institute of Religion, where he was ordained in 1946. He had served from 1938 to 1944 as a cantor and director of Jewish education at the Forest Hills Jewish Center, from 1944 to 1946 as its student rabbi, and from 1946 to 1948 as its rabbi. Abramowitz served until 1956, moving the following year to Temple B'rith Sholom of Springfield Illinois, where served the rest of his rabbinical career.

In 1949, the congregation started using the Union Prayer Book for High Holy Days, and Beth Israel joined the Union for Reform Judaism (then Union of American Hebrew Congregations). That same year, the members began construction of the building at 840 Highland Road (at Euclid Avenue). The building was completed by September 1950, in time for Rosh Hashanah.

Abramowitz was succeeded as rabbi by Robert Bergman (1957–1961) and Joseph Hewzog (1961–1974). Hewzog was succeeded by Samuel Weingart in 1974. Raised in Des Moines, Iowa, Weingart was a graduate of State University of Iowa, and had been ordained at Hebrew Union College-Jewish Institute of Religion in 1962. He served until 1985, and later served as rabbi of Temple Israel of West Lafayette, Indiana.

Weingart was succeeded as rabbi in 1985 by Stephen Sniderman. A native of Toronto, Canada, Sniderman was a graduate of York University and was ordained at Hebrew Union College in 1975. He served until 1996, and was succeeded that year by Jacques Cukierkorn. Cukierkorn. Due to falling membership, the synagogue closed its doors and merged with Congregation Rodef Sholom (now Congregation Ohev Beth Sholom) in nearby Youngstown in July 2013. The Highland Road building was sold to a local Apostolic Christian congregation for roughly $40,000 and renamed Greater New and Living Way Temple of the Apostolic Faith.
