= Paul McKee (writer) =

Dr. Paul McKee
- Born: October 14, 1899; Sharon, Pennsylvania
- Died: November 26, 1974 (aged 75); Greeley, Colorado
- Education: Doctorate
- Alma mater: University of Iowa
- Occupations: Professor and author
- Spouse: Grace McCullough
- Writing career
- Language: English
- Genre: Children's reading primers

Dr. Paul McKee (October 14, 1898 – November 26, 1974) was a university professor, a writer of children's books, and was regarded as "one of the most eminent scholars in his field". McKee earned a doctorate at the University of Iowa before joining the faculty at the University of Northern Colorado.

== Books ==
- A Primer for Parents
- English for Meaning 3
- English for Meaning 4
- English for Meaning 6
- English for Meaning 8
- Primer for Parents: How Your Child Learns to Read
- Reading and Literature in the Elementary School
- Reading for Meaning 1
- Reading: A Program of Instruction for the Elementary School
- Sky Lines
- The Teaching of Reading in the Elementary School

=== Reading for Meaning series ===
- Bright Peaks
- Climbing Higher
- Come Along
- Getting Ready to Read: A Pre-Reading Program
- High Roads
- Looking Ahead
- On We Go
- The Big Show
- Tip
- Tip and Mitten
- Up and Away
- With Jack and Janet

=== Language for Meaning series ===
- Building Your Language
- Communicating Ideas
- Enriching Your Language
- Improving Your Language
- Let's Talk
- Making Words Work
- Mastering Your Language
- Perfecting Your Language
- Sharing Experiences
