= Michael Gruitza =

American politician

Michael C. Gruitza

Member of the Pennsylvania House of Representatives from the 7th district
- In office January 6, 1981 – November 30, 2006
- Preceded by: Reid L. Bennett
- Succeeded by: Mark Longietti

Personal details
- Born: May 2, 1951 (age 75) Sharon, Pennsylvania, U.S.
- Party: Democratic
- Spouse: Joan Shaw

Michael C. Gruitza (Romanian: Gruița; born May 2, 1951) is a former Democratic member of the Pennsylvania House of Representatives.

Gruzita attended Kennedy Catholic High School, graduating in 1969.

He earned a degree from Gannon College in 1973 and a law degree from Ohio Northern University in 1977.

He was first elected to represent the 7th legislative district in the Pennsylvania House of Representatives in 1980. He retired prior to the 2006 elections.
