= James Henry Taylor =

American mathematician

- Born: February 21, 1893; Sharon, Pennsylvania, U.S.
- Died: March 30, 1972 (aged 79)
- Education: University of Nebraska Omaha; University of Chicago; Princeton University

James Henry Taylor (February 21, 1893 – March 30, 1972) was a professor of mathematics at George Washington University from 1929–1958, and professor emeritus from 1959 until his death.

== Early life ==
Born on February 21, 1893, in Sharon, Pennsylvania, Taylor died of cancer on March 30, 1972, at the age of 79. In addition to the title of professor, Taylor was also referred to as an emeritus of mathematics in Residence from 1958 until his death.

Taylor was a graduate of three different universities. The first was the University of Nebraska Omaha. Secondly he enrolled in the University of Chicago. Lastly, he attended Princeton University where he was a National Research Fellow.

== Military service ==
Before becoming a professor, Taylor was a Second Lieutenant in the United States Army in World War I from August 1917 to August 1918. As a Second Lieutenant, the entry-level rank for most commissioned officers, Taylor led a platoon-size element. He was then promoted to First Lieutenant and saw duty in France in the 351st Infantry, a position he held until June 1919. (Washington Post, Dr. James H. Taylor, Mathematician at GW).

During World War II, he was a mathematical advisor at Fort Belvoir in Virginia and at the Department of Terrestrial Magnetism at the Carnegie Institute. According to DTM, "scientists bring the perspective of several disciplines to broad questions about nature."

After World War I, he was a National Research Fellow in Mathematics from September 1924 until September 1925. During the summer of 1919, he was a "boilermaker’s helper," at the Chicago, Burlington and Quincy Railroad Shops in Havelock, Nebraska. He worked with the Nebraska Department of Public Works computing road coasts during the summers of 1921 and 1922.

== Teaching career ==
Taylor began his teaching career as an assistant in mathematics at the University of Nebraska in 1919, where he taught for a year until becoming an instructor from 1920 to 1922. He then transferred to Northwestern University in Chicago in 1923, where he was a part-time math instructor for a year. In 1924, Taylor received his Ph.D. in mathematics from the University of Chicago. He furthered his profession in 1925 when he became an assistant professor of mathematics at Lehigh University in Bethlehem, Pennsylvania. After working for a year at Lehigh, Taylor began working at the University of Wisconsin, again as an assistant professor of mathematics from 1926 until 1929. Then, in 1929, he started his career at the George Washington University where he was a full-time professor of mathematics for the first time.

During the time that Taylor taught at the George Washington University from 1929–1958 the mathematics department was relatively basic. He taught classes in advanced analytics, geometry, and tensor analysis. In 1950–1951 the department expanded a little, offering 34 classes ranging from college algebra to analytic geometry to plane trigonometry. Taylor taught continued to teach classes in advanced analytic geometry and vector analysis, in addition to integral equations, differential geometry, and tensor analysis.

After teaching at the George Washington University for almost thirty years Taylor retired in 1959. In 1963 he moved to Wichita, Kansas. Taylor died nine years later from cancer and a memorial was established in his honor with the American Cancer Society. The burial was held in La Veta, Colorado.

George Washington University established The Taylor Prize in Mathematics in his honor.

== Professional affiliations ==
Taylor was a member of the American Mathematical Society, which was founded in 1818 to further the interests of mathematics research and scholarship. In the sciences, he was a member of the American Association for the Advancement of Science, the Geophysics Society, and the Washington Academy of Sciences. He was a Phi Beta Kappa at the University of Nebraska, a Sigma Xi, and a member of the Masons and the Cosmos Club.

Taylor was published in numerous mathematical works and was listed in Who’s Who in America. He was the author of a book on vector analysis, involving magnitude and direction, and wrote several articles on various mathematical topics. In December 1944, Taylor wrote an article on the "Terrestrial Magnetism and Atmospheric Electricity." Taylor wrote another article entitled, "Parallelism and Transversality in a Sub-Space of a General (Finsler) Space." This article was presented to the American Mathematical Society on April 16, 1972.
