= Avenue of Flags =

Park in Hermitage

Coordinates: 41.23450°N 80.46136°W

Avenue of Flags is a park in Hermitage, Pennsylvania, United States, erected during the Iran hostage crisis of 1979–1981 to honor the American diplomats held hostage in Tehran, Iran. The park is on the grounds of the Hillcrest Memorial Park cemetery and is open to the public.

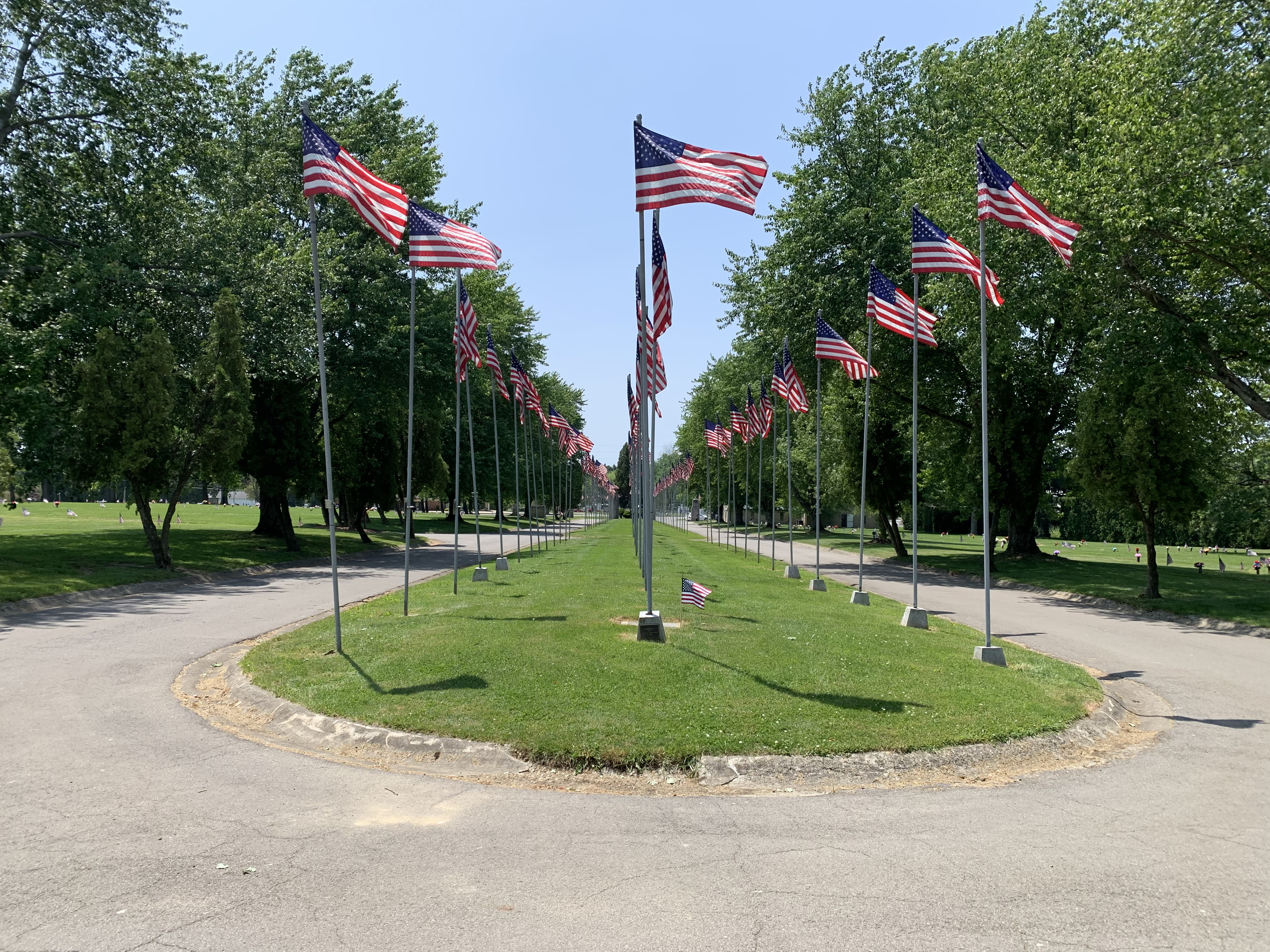
Avenue of 444 Flags

The memorial began as a single American flag, surrounded by flags representing each of the 50 states, and was created by Tom Flynn, the owner of the adjacent Hillcrest Memorial Park cemetery. On February 11, 1980, the 100th day of captivity, Flynn decided to erect 100 flags and raise one flag every day afterward until the hostages were freed. The American hostages were held in Iran from November 4, 1979, to January 20, 1981. At the end, there were 444 flags, one for each day of captivity. One Canadian flag also flies on the avenue as a tribute to the Canadians from the Canadian Embassy in Tehran who risked their lives to save six hostages from captivity. There is also an eternal flame which burns in front of the monument dedicated to the eight American servicemen who died in the failed hostage rescue attempt on April 25, 1980.

The Avenue of the Flags is now run by the Non-profit Avenue of Flags Foundation.
