= Intermediate units in Pennsylvania =

School service agencies in Pennsylvania

In Pennsylvania, intermediate units are regional educational service agencies, established by the Pennsylvania General Assembly. Intermediate units are public entities and serve a given geographic area's educational needs and function as a step of organization above that of a public school district, but below that of the Pennsylvania Department of Education.

== Description ==
=== Governance ===
Intermediate units are governed by a board of directors; each member is also a member of a local school board from the IU's region. Board members are elected by school directors of all the region's school districts for three-year terms that begin July 1. IU board members have a separate fiduciary responsibility to the IU and are not intended to be representatives of their home districts. They are funded by school districts, state and federal program specific funding and grants. IUs do not have the power to tax. Annual budgets of the intermediate unit must be approved by a majority of the school boards in the districts it serves.

=== Creation ===
The Pennsylvania state system of intermediate units (IU) was created in 1970, as part of the public school system of the Commonwealth, replacing the 67 county superintendents of schools offices which had existed since the 1850s. Act 102 created the boundaries for each IU, assigned every school district to an intermediate unit, established a system of governance and a mechanism for funding IUs, and identified a broad array of services IUs may provide. These include: curriculum development and instructional improvement; educational planning services; instructional materials services (technology); continuing professional development; pupil personnel services; management services; and, state and federal agency liaison services.

== List of intermediate units ==
There are twenty-nine intermediate units in the Commonwealth of Pennsylvania, each serving a given region:

IU number and name		Counties served	Website
IU1	Intermediate Unit 1	Fayette, Greene, Washington	IU1 website
IU2	Pittsburgh–Mt. Oliver Intermediate Unit	Allegheny (Pittsburgh Public Schools only)	IU2 website
IU3	Allegheny Intermediate Unit (AIU)	Allegheny (except Pittsburgh Public Schools)	IU3 website
IU4	Midwestern Intermediate Unit (MIU)	Butler, Lawrence, Mercer	IU4 website
IU5	Northwest Tri-County Intermediate Unit	Crawford, Erie, Warren	IU5 website
IU6	Riverview Intermediate Unit	Clarion, Forest, Jefferson, Venango	IU6 website
IU7	Westmoreland Intermediate Unit	Westmoreland	IU7 website
IU8	Appalachia Intermediate Unit	Bedford, Blair, Cambria, Somerset	IU8 website
IU9	Seneca Highlands Intermediate Unit	Cameron, Elk, McKean, Potter	IU9 website
IU10	Central Intermediate Unit (CIU)	Centre, Clearfield, Clinton	IU10 website
IU11	Tuscarora Intermediate Unit (TIU)	Fulton, Huntingdon, Juniata, Mifflin	IU11 website
IU12	Lincoln Intermediate Unit	Adams, Franklin, York	IU12 website
IU13	Lancaster–Lebanon Intermediate Unit	Lancaster, Lebanon	IU13 website
IU14	Berks County Intermediate Unit	Berks	IU14 website
IU15	Capital Area Intermediate Unit (CAIU)	Cumberland, Dauphin, Perry	IU15 website
IU16	Central Susquehanna Intermediate Unit	Columbia, Montour, Northumberland, Snyder, Union	IU16 website
IU17	Bradford Lycoming Sullivan Tioga (BLaST) Intermediate Unit	Bradford, Lycoming, Sullivan, Tioga	IU17 website
IU18	Luzerne Intermediate Unit	Luzerne, Wyoming	IU18 website
IU19	Northeastern Educational Intermediate Unit	Lackawanna, Susquehanna, Wayne	IU19 website
IU20	Colonial Intermediate Unit	Monroe, Northampton, Pike	IU20 website
IU21	Carbon Lehigh Intermediate Unit	Carbon, Lehigh	IU21 website
IU22	Bucks County Intermediate Unit	Bucks	IU22 website
IU23	Montgomery County Intermediate Unit	Montgomery	IU23 website
IU24	Chester County Intermediate Unit	Chester	IU24 website
IU25	Delaware County Intermediate Unit	Delaware	IU25 website
IU26	Philadelphia Intermediate Unit	Philadelphia (Philadelphia Public Schools)	IU26 website
IU27	Beaver Valley Intermediate Unit	Beaver	IU27 website
IU28	Armstrong–Indiana (ARIN) Intermediate Unit	Armstrong, Indiana	IU28 website
IU29	Schuylkill Intermediate Unit	Schuylkill	IU29 website

== See also ==
- List of Pennsylvania state agencies
