= Northwest Tri-County Intermediate Unit =

School district in Pennsylvania

Coordinates: 41.87582°N 80.12208°W

The Northwest Tri-County Intermediate Unit, also known as IU5, is one of the 29 intermediate units in Pennsylvania. This regional educational service agency was created by the state's General Assembly in 1971, and is headquartered in Edinboro, PA. The unit serves Crawford, Erie, and Warren counties.
