= Kowalski v. Berkeley County Schools =

- Court: United States Court of Appeals for the Fourth Circuit
- Full case name: Kowalski v. Berkeley County Schools
- Argued: March 25 2011
- Decided: July 27 2011
- Citation: 652 F.3d 565

Case history
- Procedural history: Affirmed decision for the defendants from 2009 WL 10675108 (N.D. W.Va. 2000)

Holding
- The defendants did not violate the plaintiff's First Amendment free speech rights.

Case opinions
- Majority: Paul V. Niemeyer

Laws applied
- First Amendment to the United States Constitution

Kowalski v. Berkeley County Schools, 652 F.3d 565 (2011), was a freedom of speech case of the United States Court of Appeals for the Fourth Circuit concerning the online speech of a public school student. The appeals court affirmed the decision of the district court that the student's suspension for online harassment of a fellow student was constitutional.

== Background ==
When Kara Kowalski was a senior at Musselman High School in Berkeley County, West Virginia, school officials suspended her for five days for creating and maintaining a MySpace profile called S.A.S.H., which Kowalski claimed stood for "Students Against Sluts Herpes". A classmate claimed that the acronym actually stood for "Students Against Shay's Herpes", and that the page was largely dedicated to ridiculing a fellow student (known only as Shay N.). Kowalski was suspended after Shay N. and her parents complained to the principal of the school.

Kowalski sued the school district under the United States civil code, claiming that her suspension was a retaliation for her speech and therefore a violation of her First Amendment rights. Kowalski also claimed that the school's code of conduct deprived her of due process rights to appeal her suspension, while the suspension caused her emotional distress.

Kowalski argued that her use of the MySpace page was not a school-related activity and her expression did not occur on school grounds. Therefore it was "private out-of-school speech" that did not cause an in-school disruption of the type that officials could restrict per the Tinker v. Des Moines Independent Community School District precedent. The school district argued that Kowalski could be suspended because her speech specifically targeted her fellow student Shay N., possibly disrupting that student's education experience. The school also cited its own code of conduct that forbade harassment of fellow students.

In 2009, the district court ruled that the suspension did not violate Kowaski's constitutional rights because it caused in-school disruptions and invited harassment of other students. Kowalski appealed this decision to the Fourth Circuit.

== Opinion ==
The Fourth Circuit set to determine whether Kowalski's speech fell within the school’s legitimate interest in maintaining order and protecting the well-being and educational rights of its students. Per the Tinker precedent, public schools may restrict student speech that disrupts the educational environment; and per Bethel v. Fraser, schools can restrict student speech that is "lewd and vulgar".

The circuit court found that Kowalski's speech fell within the bounds of both of these precedents, because it caused a disruption that does not qualify for First Amendment protection per the Tinker precedent. The MySpace page functioned as a platform for students to direct verbal attacks, defamatory statements, and vulgar labels toward a classmate, and the court held that this was speech that public school officials are not required to tolerate. The court also cited a Sixth Circuit precedent affirming the ability of public schools to prevent or punish speech-related harassment of students. Despite the fact that Kowalski created the MySpace page outside of school grounds, this was found to be in-school speech due to the disruption it caused within the school as Shay N. was targeted for harassment.

Ultimately, the circuit court affirmed the district court ruling, holding that the school’s punishment of Kowalski for her home-based online harassment of Shay N. was permissible and not a violation of Kowalski’s First Amendment free speech rights. Kowalski's claim that the school's code of conduct had deprived her of due process was rejected by the court because all students had been made aware of the code and its requirements, while such a code is permitted to be flexible and does not require the specificity of a criminal code. Kowalski's claim of intentional infliction of emotional distress by the school district was also rejected because under West Virginia law, there was no evidence that her safety was at risk.

Kowalski appealed the ruling to the United States Supreme Court, but certiorari was rejected.

== Impact ==
Kowalski v. Berkeley County Schools has been cited as an important precedent for the law of cyberbullying in public schools, though some commentators claim that the ruling restricts student speech rights and causes confusion on the matter of speech that takes place outside of school grounds. Such confusion can be seen in the contradictory ruling by the Third Circuit in Layshock v. Hermitage School District. That contradiction was partially, but not completely, resolved by the U.S. Supreme Court in 2021 in Mahanoy Area School District v. B.L.
