= Reid Bennett =

American politician

Reid L. Bennett

Member of the Pennsylvania House of Representatives from the 7th district
- In office January 7, 1969 – November 30, 1980
- Preceded by: District created
- Succeeded by: Michael Gruitza

Member of the Pennsylvania House of Representatives from the Mercer County district
- In office January 5, 1965 – November 30, 1968

Personal details
- Born: February 7, 1929 Sharpsville, Pennsylvania
- Died: January 26, 2000 (aged 70) Estero, Florida
- Party: Democratic

Reid L. Bennett (February 7, 1929 – January 26, 2000) was a former Democratic member of the Pennsylvania House of Representatives.
