= Elisha Qimron =

Israeli scholar (born 1943)

- אלישע קימרון
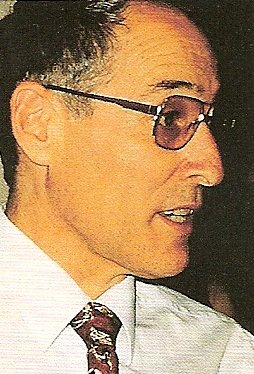
- Elisha Qimron
- Born: 5 February 1943 (age 83)
- Education: Hebrew University of Jerusalem (Ph.D., 1976)
- Occupations: Scholar, Professor of Hebrew Language
- Employer: Ben‑Gurion University of the Negev
- Known for: Research on the Hebrew of the Dead Sea Scrolls; work on 4QMMT; publication and reconstruction of scrolls
- Awards: Israel Prize in Jewish Studies (2018)

Elisha Qimron (Hebrew: אלישע קימרון; born 5 February 1943) is an academic who studies ancient Hebrew, with specialization in the Dead Sea Scrolls.

== Early life and education ==
Qimron was born in 1943 in Tel Aviv in Mandatory Palestine, and grew up in Hanita, a kibbutz in northern Israel. He received his undergraduate degree and master's degree from the Hebrew University of Jerusalem, where he also earned his Doctor of Philosophy degree in 1976.

== Career ==
Qimron is an emeritus professor in the Department of Hebrew Language at Ben-Gurion University of the Negev, in Israel. For several decades, he has been one of the team of international scholars working on the Dead Sea Scrolls, particularly on the texts found in Cave 4 at Qumran.

In 1979 Qimron was asked by John Strugnell, the editor-in-chief of the Dead Sea Scrolls publication team, to assist in completing long-overdue work on the Halakhic Letter (4QMMT) on which Strugnell had been working alone since 1959. The work on the fragments was eventually completed and published in 1994. Qimron was the first Israeli scholar on the team.

== Controversy and lawsuit ==
During the late 1970s and the early 1980s, many scholars felt frustrated at the delay in publishing the Dead Sea Scrolls. It was generally known that most of the texts had been translated but still had not been available to researchers. Some also complained about the proprietary attitude of some of Strugnell's team toward the scrolls that they were working on, which made access to them difficult, if not impossible, in some cases.

Hershel Shanks, of the Biblical Archaeology Society, decided that the reconstructions of the Dead Sea Scrolls should be made available to scholars. In 1992, he published the two-volume A Facsimile Edition of the Dead Sea Scrolls. It included, without permission, material on the Halakhic Letter (4QMMT) that Qimron had been working on for some 11 years. Qimron had even given the document its title.

Qimron decided to sue the Biblical Archaeology Society for breaching his copyright on the grounds that the research it had published was his intellectual property, as he had reconstructed about 40% of the published text. Such reconstruction is unique in the sense that if the original photographs had been given to 100 researchers, that number of different reconstructions would be made.

In 1993, Judge Dalia Dorner of the Israeli Supreme Court awarded Qimron the highest compensation allowed by law for aggravation in compensation against Shanks and others. A 2000 appeal in front of Judge Aharon Barak and colleagues upheld the verdict.

== Honors and awards ==
In 2018, Qimron was selected to receive the Israel Prize in Jewish studies for his work on the Dead Sea Scrolls. He has also won several other awards including the Robert and Michel Asraf Academy Prize, the Zalman Shazar Prize for the Study of the History of Israel, and the Mifal HaPais Landau Prize for Science and Research.

== Personal life ==
Qimron is married and has three children. His sister was the linguist Leah Tzivoni.

== Publications ==
- Elisha Qimron, John Strugnell et al. (1994) Discoveries in the Judaean Desert Volume X. Qumran Cave 4: V: Miqsat Ma'ase Ha-Torah. Oxford University Press.
- Elisha Qimron. (1996). The Temple Scroll: A Critical Edition with Extensive Reconstructions. Ben-Gurion University of the Negev.
- Edited by Donald W. Parry and Elisha Qimron. (1999). Studies on the Texts of the Desert of Judah – STDJ 32. Brill Academic Publishers.
- Elisha Qimron. The Hebrew of the Dead Sea Scrolls. Harvard Semitic Studies, Scholars Press, Atlanta.
- Edited by Donald W. Parry and Elisha Qimron. (1999). The Great Isaiah Scroll (1QIsaª). A New Edition Brill Academic Publishers.
- Elisha Qimron. (2010). The Dead Sea Scrolls: The Hebrew Writings. Volume 1. Yad Ben-Zvi Press.
- Elisha Qimron. (2013). The Dead Sea Scrolls: The Hebrew Writings. Volume 2. Yad Ben-Zvi Press.
- Elisha Qimron. (2014). The Dead Sea Scrolls: The Hebrew Writings. Volume 3: Between Bible and Mishnah. Yad Ben-Zvi Press.
