= Montgomery County Intermediate Unit =

School district in Pennsylvania

Coordinates: 40.12671°N 75.36691°W

The Montgomery County Intermediate Unit (MCIU) was founded in Norristown, Pennsylvania, United States and is located in Montgomery County, Pennsylvania. It is one of 29 Intermediate Units formed by the Pennsylvania General Assembly in 1971 to provide support to local school districts. Created to replace the County Office of Superintendent, Intermediate Units provide special services as needed by the educational community in their service area. MCIU services are designed to align with the educational and social service needs of Montgomery County's schools. It was originally located at 1605 West Main Street in rural Norristown, before being moved to a much larger location at 2 West Lafayette Street in downtown Norristown in 2017.

The MCIU is governed by a 22-member board of directors composed of representatives from each of the 22 component school districts in Montgomery County. Services are provided through nine divisions: Curriculum, Instruction and Professional Development; Human Resources; Technology and Information Services; Legislative Services and Grant Development; Financial and Management Services; Nonpublic School Services; PaTTAN; Special Education, and Communications. Funding sources include state subsidy, government and foundation grants, contributions from districts and fees for service.
