= Midwestern Intermediate Unit IV =

School district in Pennsylvania

Midwestern Intermediate Unit IV is an Intermediate Unit educational services agency based in Grove City, Pennsylvania. It serves Butler, Lawrence, and Mercer counties. It has a staff of more than 700 people and serves 27 school districts.
