= Hershel Shanks =

American biblical archaeologist (1930–2021)

- Born: March 8, 1930; Sharon, Pennsylvania, U.S.
- Died: February 5, 2021 (aged 90); Washington, D.C., U.S.
- Education: Haverford College; Columbia University; Harvard University
- Occupations: Lawyer, biblical archaeologist
- Known for: Founder and long-time editor of the Biblical Archaeology Review

Hershel Shanks (March 8, 1930 – February 5, 2021) was an American lawyer and amateur biblical archaeologist who was the founder and long-time editor of the Biblical Archaeology Review.

For more than forty years, he communicated the world of biblical archaeology to general readers through magazines, books, and conferences. Shanks was "probably the world's most influential amateur Biblical archaeologist," according to The New York Times book critic Richard Bernstein.

== Life and career ==
Shanks was born in Sharon, Pennsylvania, where his father owned a shoe store. He graduated from Haverford College (English), Columbia University (sociology) and Harvard Law School. After over three decades of legal practice, he became interested in archaeology during a year spent in Jerusalem.

In 1974, he founded the Biblical Archaeology Society and in 1975 the Biblical Archaeology Review, which he edited until transitioning to Editor Emeritus in 2018. He has written and edited numerous works on biblical archaeology. He used the pseudonym "Adam Mikaya" for a few articles published in the Biblical Archaeology Review. He also wrote works on the Dead Sea Scrolls.

In a legal case before the Israeli Supreme Court in 1993, Shanks and others were successfully sued by leading Dead Sea Scrolls scholar Elisha Qimron for breach of copyright when Shanks, without permission, published material written by Qimron in A Facsimile Edition of the Dead Sea Scrolls. In 2000, Shanks' appeal of the earlier decision was dismissed.

Shanks was the editor of Moment Magazine for 15 years from 1987.

His television appearances included Who Wrote the Bible? (1996), The Naked Archaeologist (2005), and Mysteries of the Bible.

Shanks died from complications of COVID-19 at his home in Washington, D.C., on February 5, 2021, one month and three days short of his 91st birthday.

== Works ==
=== Books ===
- Shanks, Hershel (1973). The City of David: A guide to Biblical Jerusalem. Tel Aviv, Israel: Bazak Israel Guidebook Publishers. ISBN 9780960709212. OCLC 2378283.
- ——— (1993). In the Temple of Solomon and the Tomb of Caiaphas. Washington, DC: Biblical Archaeology Society. ISBN 9781880317112. OCLC 645662424.
- ——— (1995). Jerusalem: An Archaeological Biography. New York: Random House. ISBN 9780679445265. OCLC 32778599.
- ——— (1998). The Mystery and Meaning of the Dead Sea Scrolls. New York: Random House. ISBN 9780679457572. OCLC 37499858.
- ——— (1999). 101 Best Jewish Jokes. Illustrated by Dave Clark. Washington, DC: Moment Publications. ISBN 9780967163208. OCLC 1026500545.
- ———; Witherington III, Ben (2003). The Brother of Jesus: The Dramatic Story & Meaning of the First Archaeological Link to Jesus & His Family. San Francisco: HarperSanFrancisco. ISBN 9780060556600. OCLC 51865713.

=== Edited by ===
- ———; Mazar, Benjamin, eds. (1984). Recent Archaeology in the Land of Israel. Washington, DC: Biblical Archaeology Society. ISBN 9780961308902. OCLC 10802842.
- ———, ed. (1988). Ancient Israel: A Short History from Abraham to the Roman Destruction of the Temple. Washington, DC: Biblical Archaeology Society. ISBN 9781880317532. OCLC 40395711.
- Hershel Shanks, editor, Early Israel, Biblical Archaeology Society 1990, ISBN 0-685-45487-8
- Hershel Shanks, editor, Christianity and Rabbinic Judaism: A Parallel History of Their Origins and Early Development, Biblical Archaeology Society 1992, ISBN 1-880317-08-7
- Hershel Shanks, editor, Understanding the Dead Sea Scrolls: A Reader From the Biblical Archaeology Review, Vintage Press reprint 1993, ISBN 0-679-74445-2
- Hershel Shanks and Suzanne F. Singer, editors, Cancel My Subscription: The Best of Queries and Comments from Letters to Biblical Archaeology Review, Biblical Archaeology Society 1995, ISBN 1-880317-44-3
- Hershel Shanks, editor, Abraham & Family: New Insights into the Patriarchal Narratives, Biblical Archaeology Society 2000, ISBN 1-880317-57-5
- Hershel Shanks, editor, City of David: Revisiting Early Excavations, English translations of Reports by Raymond Weill and Louis-Hugues Vincent, Notes and Comments by Ronny Reich, Biblical Archaeology Society 2004, ISBN 1-880317-70-2

=== Memoir ===
- ——— (2010). Freeing the Dead Sea Scrolls and Other Adventures of an Archaeology Outsider. Continuum. ISBN 978-1-4411-5217-6.
