= Parke Wentling =

American politician

Member of the Pennsylvania House of Representatives
- Incumbent
- Assumed office January 6, 2015
- Preceded by: Michele Brooks
- Constituency: 17th District (2015-2022); 7th District (2023-present)

Personal details
- Born: May 14, 1972 (age 54) Greenville, Pennsylvania, U.S.
- Party: Republican
- Spouse: Jennifer
- Children: 2
- Education: California University of Pennsylvania (BS, MS)
- Website: Official website

Parke H. Wentling (born May 14, 1972) is an American politician and current member of the Pennsylvania House of Representatives, representing the 7th District since 2023. A Republican, Wentling previously represented the 17th District from 2015 until 2022.

== Early life, education, and career ==
Wentling was born on May 14, 1972, in Greenville, Pennsylvania. He was raised in Greenville and graduated from Greenville Area High School in 1990. Wentling earned a Bachelor of Science degree from California University of Pennsylvania in 1997 and a Master in Science from Clarion University of Pennsylvania in 2010. From 1997 to 2014, Wentling taught at Wilmington Area School District.

== Political career ==
In 2014, Wentling was first elected to represent the 17th District in the Pennsylvania House of Representatives. He was twice re-elected to represent the 17th District in 2018 and 2020. Following redistricting, Wentling was moved to the 7th District, which he was elected to represent in 2022.

In 2019, Wentling was chosen to chair the Joint Legislative Air and Water Pollution Control and Conservation Committee. a body he has served on since 2017.

In 2021, Wentling, a member of the Pennsylvania Historical and Museum Commission, penned an op-ed where he denounced historical markers falling victim to "revisionist history driven by woke cancel culture." He contended that the Commission's implementation of Diversity, Equity, Inclusion, and Access led to markers getting removed for ideological reasons, comparing the Commission to the Ministry of Truth in George Orwell's dystopian novel 1984. Wentling also blamed "unelected bureaucrat far-left ideologues within [Governor Tom Wolf's] administration using their positions to implement a belief system they cannot enact through legislative means." and suggested privatizing the erection and maintenance of historical markers. A spokesman for the Commission partially pushedback on Wentling's assertions, stating that any markers that were removed were done so because of "outdated cultural references" written by the Commission's predecessor body. The spokesman also said any removals or replacements were done with the cooperation of historical experts.

== Personal life ==
Wentling lives in Greenville, Pennsylvania with his wife Jennifer and their two children. They attend Zion’s Reformed Church in Greenville where Wentling also serves as a deacon.

== Electoral history ==
2014 Pennsylvania House of Representatives Republican primary election, District 17
Party	Candidate	Votes	%
Republican	Parke Wentling	2,039	42.71
Republican	Edward J. Franz	1,363	28.55
Republican	Gary J. Temple	613	12.84
Republican	Patrick James Gehrlein	582	12.19
Republican	David George Biros	177	3.71
Total votes		4,774	100.00

2014 Pennsylvania House of Representatives election, District 17
Party	Candidate	Votes	%
Republican	Parke Wentling	11,197	67.32
Democratic	Wayne E. Hanson	5,435	32.68
Total votes		16,632	100.00

2016 Pennsylvania House of Representatives election, District 17
Party	Candidate	Votes	%
Republican	Parke Wentling (incumbent)	18,937	71.27
Democratic	Wayne E. Hanson	7,633	28.73
Total votes		26,570	100.00

2018 Pennsylvania House of Representatives election, District 17
Party	Candidate	Votes	%
Republican	Parke Wentling (incumbent)	Unopposed	
Total votes		12,934	100.00

2020 Pennsylvania House of Representatives election, District 17
Party	Candidate	Votes	%
Republican	Parke Wentling (incumbent)	Unopposed	
Total votes		26,567	100.00

2022 Pennsylvania House of Representatives election, District 7
Party	Candidate	Votes	%
Republican	Parke Wentling	13,559	51.36
Democratic	Timothy M. McGonigle	12,818	48.55
Write-in		25	0.09
Total votes		26,402	100.00
