= Žipov =

- Municipality
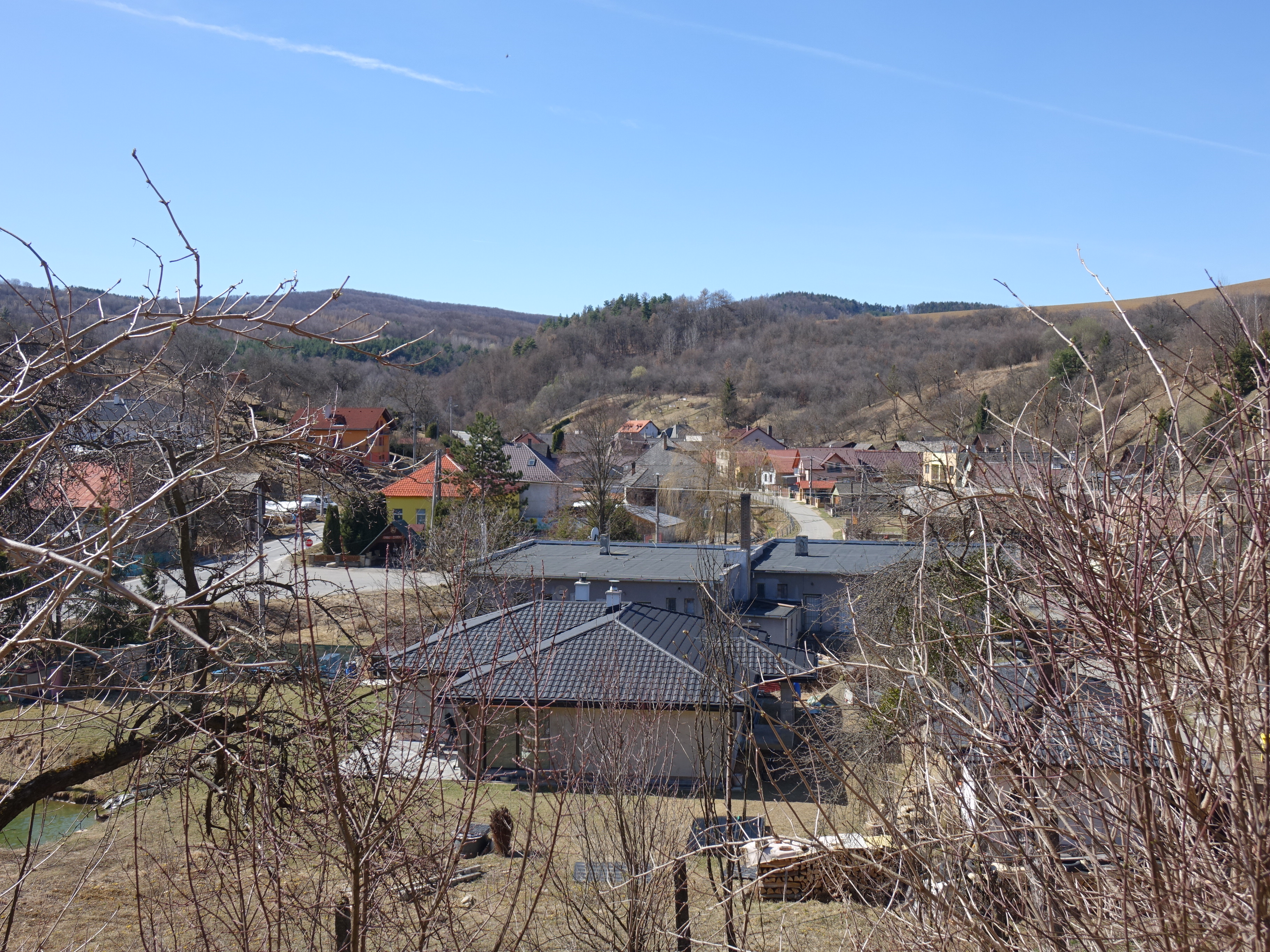

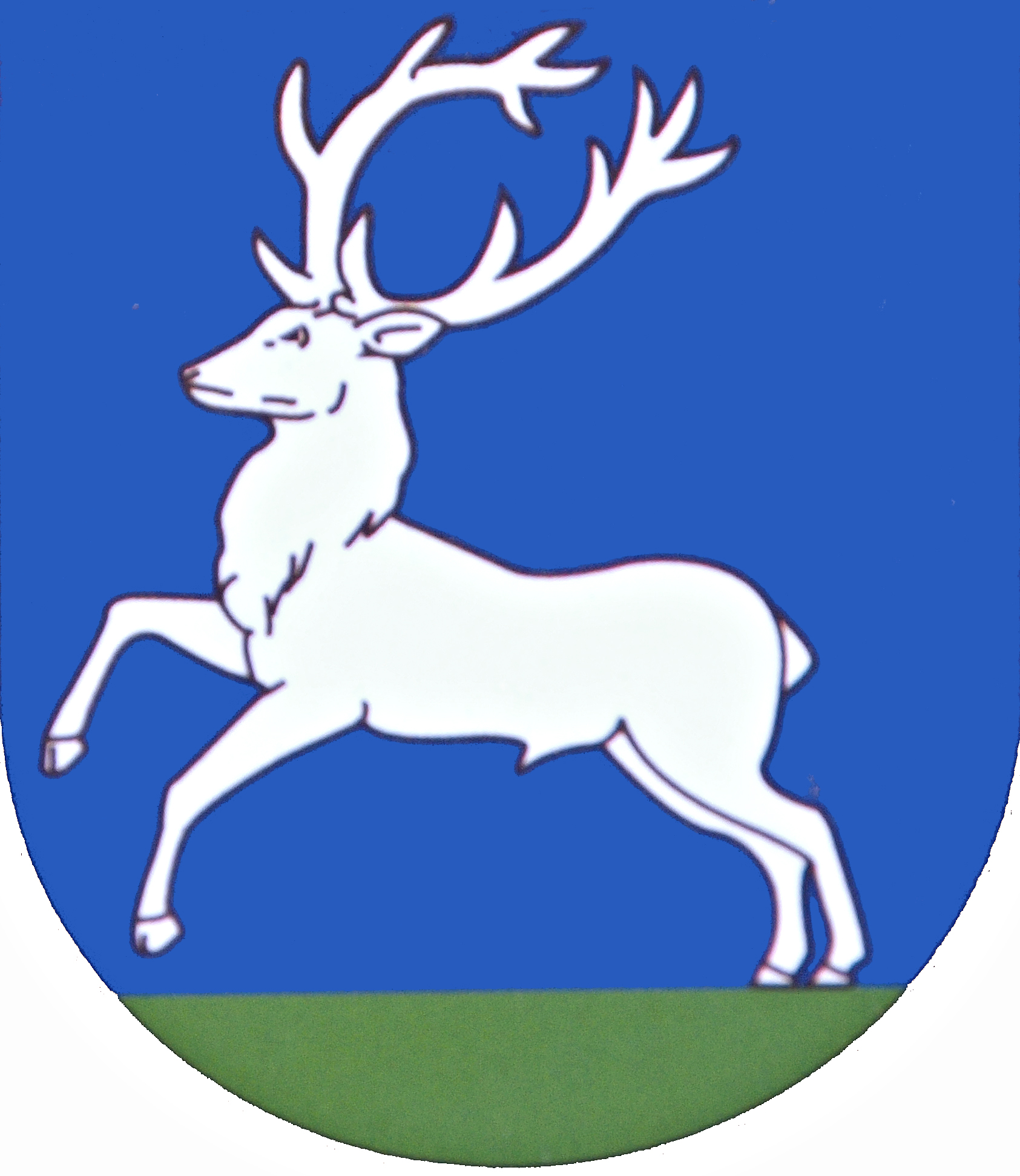
- Flag Coat of arms

- Location of Žipov in the Prešov Region Location of Žipov in Slovakia
- Coordinates: 48.97°N 21.10°E
- Country: Slovakia
- Region: Prešov Region
- District: Prešov District
- First mentioned: 1405

Area
  - Total: 7.64 km^{2} (2.95 sq mi)
- Elevation: 391 m (1,283 ft)

Population (2025)
  - Total: 285
- Time zone: UTC+1 (CET)
  - Summer (DST): UTC+2 (CEST)
- Postal code: 824 1
- Area code: +421 51
- Vehicle registration plate (until 2022): PO
- Website: zipov.sk

Žipov (Hungarian: Sárosizsép) is a village and municipality in Prešov District in the Prešov Region of eastern Slovakia.

== History ==
In historical records the village was first mentioned in 1354.

== Geography ==
The municipality lies at an altitude of 391 metres (1,283 ft) and covers an area of 7.64 km^{2} (2.95 sq mi) (2025).

== Population ==
Population statistic (10 years)
Year	1995	2005	2015	2025
Count	266	248	294	285
Difference		−6.76%	+18.54%	−3.06%

Population statistic
Year	2024	2025
Count	287	285
Difference		−0.69%

It has a population of 285 people (31 December 2025).

=== Ethnicity ===
Census 2021 (1+ %)
Ethnicity	Number	Fraction
Slovak	290	98.63%
Not found out	4	1.36%
Total	294	

In year 2021 was 294 people by ethnicity 290 as Slovak, 4 as Not found out, 2 as Rusyn and 1 as Russian.

Note on population: The difference values of population numbers in the table "Population statistic" and in the sections "Ethnicity" & "Religion" is caused by the use of various statistical methods.

=== Religion ===
Census 2021 (1+ %)
Religion	Number	Fraction
Roman Catholic Church	246	83.67%
Evangelical Church	29	9.86%
None	8	2.72%
Greek Catholic Church	4	1.36%
Not found out	3	1.02%
Total	294	

In year 2021 was 294 people by religion 246 from Roman Catholic Church, 29 from Evangelical Church, 8 from None, 4 from Greek Catholic Church, 3 from Not found out, 2 from Eastern Orthodox Church, 1 from Christian Congregations in Slovakia and 1 from Other.
