= J.S. v. Bethlehem Area School District =

- Court: Supreme Court of Pennsylvania
- Full case name: J. S., a minor, by and through his parents and natural guardians H. S. and I. S., v. Bethlehem Area School District, Thomas Doluisio and A. Thomas Kartsotis
- Decided: September 25, 2002
- Citation: 807 A.2d 803 (Pa. 2002)

Case history
- Prior actions: Student expulsion affirmed, Northampton County Court; Affirmed, 807 A.2d 847 (Pa. Cmwlth. 2000)

Case opinions
- Majority: Justice Ralph J. Cappy

J.S. v. Bethlehem Area School District, 757 A.2d 412 (Pa. 2002), was a case of the Supreme Court of Pennsylvania, which found the Bethlehem Area School District could punish a student for derogatory and allegedly threatening comments made on a website about a teacher, even though the site was created off-campus.

== Background ==
Justin Swidler, a 14-year-old from Hanover Township, Northampton County, Pennsylvania, was in 1998 an eighth grade student at the Nitschmann Middle School of the Bethlehem Area School District. Some time prior to May 1998, Swidler created a website called "Teacher Sux", in which he mocked then Nitschmann Principal Thomas Kartsotis and algebra teacher Kathleen Fulmer. The site included animated images of Kartsotis getting hit by a slow-moving bullet, and an image of Fulmer transforming into a picture of Adolf Hitler. One section of the website entitled "Why should she die?" listed several reasons Fulmer should be killed, followed by the sentence, "Take a good look at the diagram and the reasons I give, then give me $20 to help pay for the hitman." The school district learned of the website in May 1998 and contacted local police authorities and the Federal Bureau of Investigation, both of which conducted investigations but ultimately declined to press criminal charges.

The Bethlehem Area School District began disciplinary hearings against Swidler as a result of the website and, after two days of hearings in August 1998, the school board voted to permanently expel him. The board concluded the student violated the district's Student Code of Conduct by making threatening and harassing comments, and showing disrespect toward a teacher. Swidler filed an appeal with the Northampton County Court seeking to reverse the expulsion, claiming the website was protected speech under the First Amendment and that the district violated his constitutional rights. Swidler's attorneys also claimed the website included exaggerations and hyperbole and was never meant to be seen by his teachers or anyone other than his friends. The site could not be considered a serious threat, the lawyers claimed, and so should not have been treated as such by the school board. In May 1999, radio talk show host Laura Schlessinger referred to Swidler's case on her show four times in a single month, referring to Swidler as a "little creep" and urging her audience to send money to the Bethlehem Area School District to help fight the lawsuit.

On July 23, 1999, Judge Robert E. Simpson Jr. ruled in favor of the school district, claiming the website was disruptive and threatening, did not constitute protected speech and was a reasonable basis for expulsion. Simpson ruled there was ample evidence for the school board to determine that the site hindered the school's educational process, and wrote in his decision, "The federal constitution does not compel teachers, parents and elected school officials to surrender control of the American public school system to public school students." Swidler appealed the decision to the Commonwealth Court of Pennsylvania, but on February 15, 2002, a three-judge panel ruled 2-1 to uphold the previous decision.

On Wednesday November 29, 2000 a Northampton County, Pennsylvania jury awarded a settlement of $450,000 to teacher Kathleen Fulmer for violation of her privacy, and $50,000 to her husband for loss of consortium. The jury also found that Mr. and Mrs. Swidler were negligent in the supervision of their son, Justin.

Swidler, a graduate of Duke University law school, is an employment attorney in New Jersey.

== Supreme Court ruling ==
The Supreme Court of Pennsylvania issued its ruling September 25, 2002, upholding the expulsion and the two court decisions that reaffirmed it. The court had found that the website did not reflect a serious threat or expression that Swidler meant to seriously harm Fulmer or Kartsotis, describing it as "a sophomoric, crude, highly offensive and perhaps misguided attempt at humor or parody". However, the court determined the site did disrupt the Bethlehem Area School District environment, and that justified the decision to expel Swidler. Even though the website was created off-campus, the court found there was a "sufficient nexus between the web site and the boy school campus to consider the speech as occurring on-campus."

Although the Supreme Court deemed the website not to be a serious threat, the ruling determined that it was taken seriously enough by some students that they met with counselors, and by some teachers that they voiced concerns for school safety. According to the majority opinion, which was written by Justice Ralph J. Cappy, "The atmosphere of the entire school community was described as that as if a student had died. [...] Complete chaos is not required for a school district to punish free speech."
