= Sharon, Pennsylvania =

City in Pennsylvania, US

- City
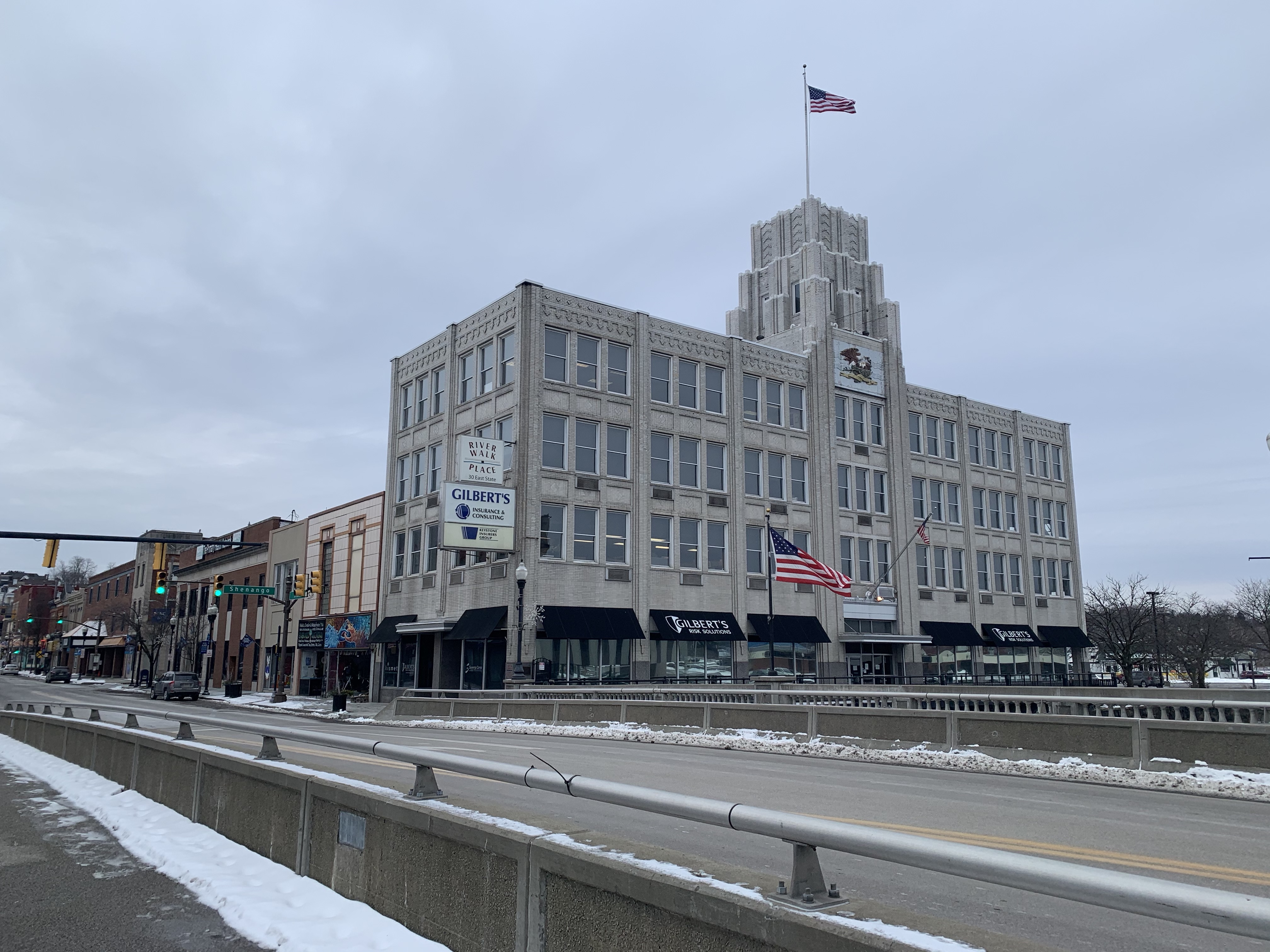
- Downtown Sharon

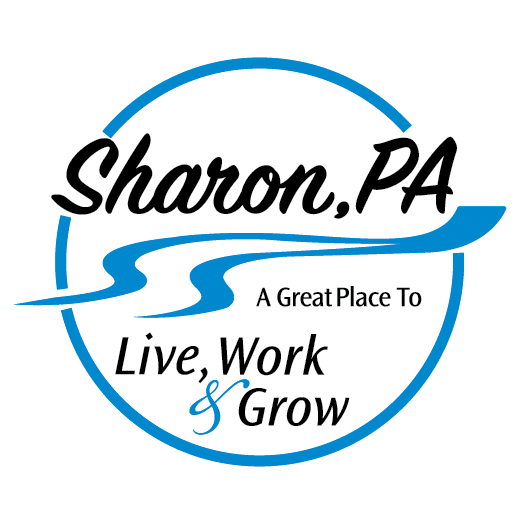
- Logo

- Location of Sharon in Mercer County, Pennsylvania.

- Location within Pennsylvania Location within the United States
- Coordinates: 41°13′48″N 80°29′56″W
- Country: United States
- State: Pennsylvania
- County: Mercer
- Established: 1795
- Incorporated (borough): October 6, 1841
- Incorporated (city): December 17, 1917

Government
  - Type: Home Rule

Area
  - Total: 3.77 sq mi (9.77 km^{2})
  - Land: 3.77 sq mi (9.77 km^{2})
  - Water: 0 sq mi (0.00 km^{2}) 0%
- Elevation: 1,000 ft (300 m)

Population (2020)
  - Total: 13,147
  - Density: 3,485.2/sq mi (1,345.65/km^{2})
- Time zone: UTC-4 (EST)
  - Summer (DST): UTC-5 (EDT)
- Zip Code: 16146
- Area codes: 724, 878
- FIPS code: 42-69720
- Website: www.cityofsharon.net

Sharon is a city in western Mercer County, Pennsylvania, United States. The city, located along the banks of the Shenango River on the state border with Ohio, is about 15 miles (24 km) northeast of Youngstown, about 65 miles (105 km) southeast of Cleveland and about 60 miles (97 km) northwest of Pittsburgh. The population was 13,147 at the 2020 census. It is part of the Hermitage micropolitan area.

== History ==
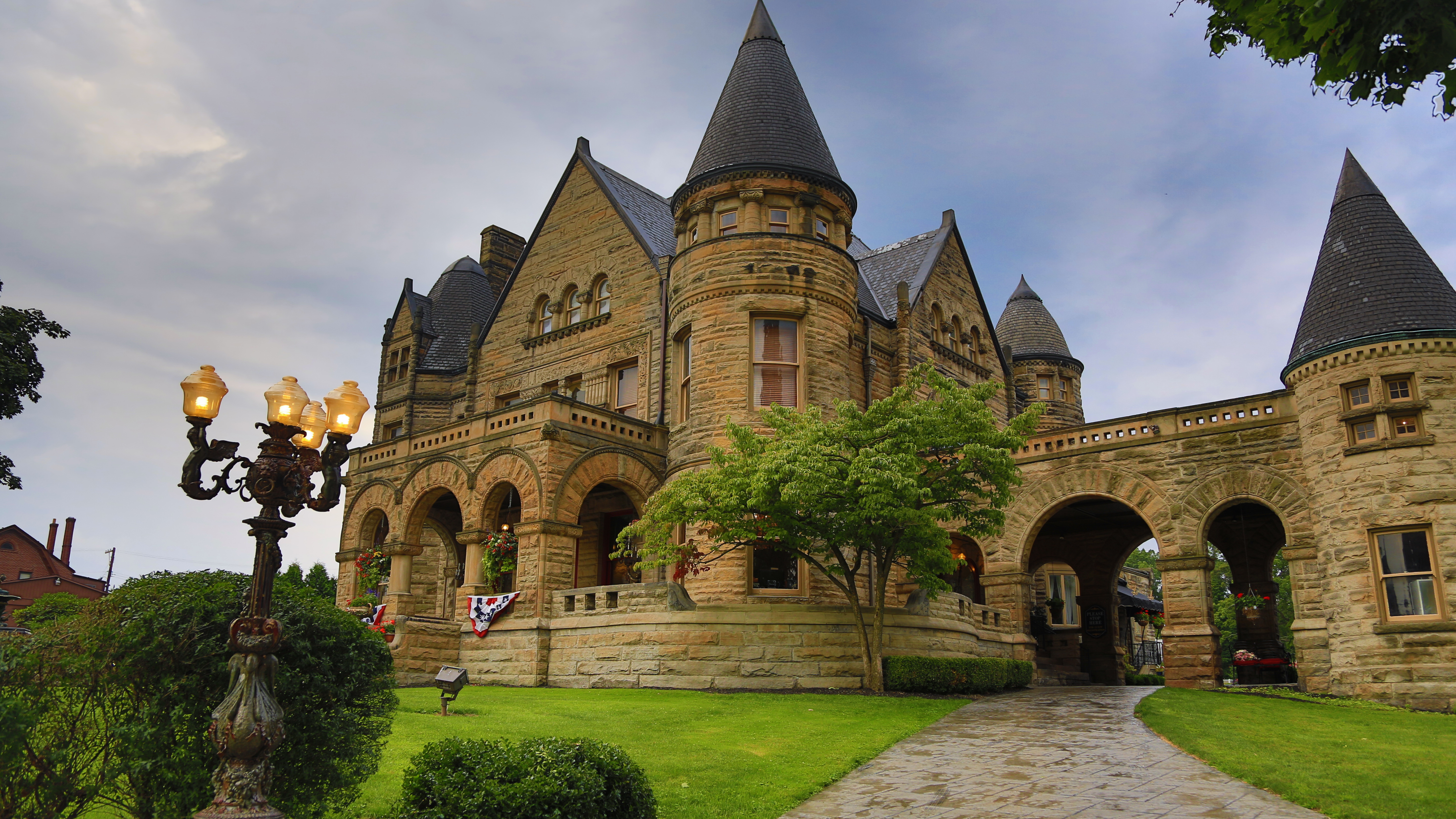
Frank H. Buhl Mansion

The Sharon area was first settled in 1795. It was incorporated as a borough on October 6, 1841, and incorporated as a city on December 17, 1918. The city operated under the Pennsylvania third-class city code until 2008, at which point it adopted a home rule charter under which the elected position of mayor was replaced with a hired city manager and financial officer.

The founding families of Sharon first settled on a flat plain bordering the Shenango River, between two hills on the southwestern edge of what is today Sharon's downtown business district. According to local legend, the community received its name from a Bible-reading settler who likened the location to the Plain of Sharon in Israel.

Initially a center of coal mining, Sharon's economy transitioned to iron and steelmaking and other heavy industry after the arrival of the Erie Extension Canal in the 1840s. Following extensive national deindustrialization of the 1970s and 1980s, the city's economy diversified and is now based primarily on light industry, education, health care, and social services.

Prior to Prohibition in 1919, Sharon was home to a large commercial beer brewery, Union Brewing Co., which was forced to close its doors like many U.S. breweries of the era. During World War II the Westinghouse Electric Corporation at Sharon produced 10,000 torpedoes for the US Navy.

In 2004, local politicians proposed the creation of the city of Shenango Valley, a new municipality consisting of Sharon as well as Hermitage, Sharpsville, Farrell, and Wheatland with the issue being put on the ballot in the form of a referendum. Then Governor of Pennsylvania, Ed Rendell voiced support for the measure and would be joined by Kathleen McGinty, Secretary of the Department of Environmental Protection, and Dennis Yablonsky, Secretary of the Department of Community and Economic Development with the trio touring the region to urge for voters to pass the motion. The city would largely be an expansion of Hermitage, whose city government would be retained including the office of mayor and its nine-member city council. The merger would have kept the various independent school districts intact. The effort would ultimately be defeated, and via the ordinance, the issue of merger could not be brought up again until 2009.

== Geography ==
Sharon is located at 41°13′48″N 80°29′56″W in southwestern Mercer County. The city borders the city of Hermitage to the north and east, the city of Farrell to the south, and on the west the census-designated places of Masury and West Hill, Ohio.

According to the U.S. Census Bureau, the city has a total area of 3.8 square miles (9.8 km^{2}), all land. The Shenango River flows through the city and provides drinking water to Sharon and several surrounding communities.

== Demographics ==
Historical population
Census	Pop.	Note	%±
1850	541		—
1860	900		66.4%
1870	4,221		369.0%
1880	5,684		34.7%
1890	7,459		31.2%
1900	8,916		19.5%
1910	15,270		71.3%
1920	21,747		42.4%
1930	25,908		19.1%
1940	25,622		−1.1%
1950	26,454		3.2%
1960	25,267		−4.5%
1970	22,653		−10.3%
1980	19,057		−15.9%
1990	17,493		−8.2%
2000	16,328		−6.7%
2010	14,038		−14.0%
2020	13,147		−6.3%

=== 2020 census ===
As of the 2020 census, Sharon had a population of 13,147. The median age was 40.6 years. 22.9% of residents were under the age of 18 and 18.5% of residents were 65 years of age or older. For every 100 females there were 93.9 males, and for every 100 females age 18 and over there were 88.9 males age 18 and over.

100.0% of residents lived in urban areas, while 0.0% lived in rural areas.

There were 5,714 households in Sharon, of which 26.8% had children under the age of 18 living in them. Of all households, 30.2% were married-couple households, 23.8% were households with a male householder and no spouse or partner present, and 37.2% were households with a female householder and no spouse or partner present. About 37.3% of all households were made up of individuals and 14.8% had someone living alone who was 65 years of age or older.

There were 6,793 housing units, of which 15.9% were vacant. The homeowner vacancy rate was 4.0% and the rental vacancy rate was 17.8%.

Racial composition as of the 2020 census
Race	Number	Percent
White	9,606	73.1%
Black or African American	2,191	16.7%
American Indian and Alaska Native	26	0.2%
Asian	87	0.7%
Native Hawaiian and Other Pacific Islander	5	0.0%
Some other race	112	0.9%
Two or more races	1,120	8.5%
Hispanic or Latino (of any race)	316	2.4%

=== 2000 census ===
As of the 2000 census, there were 16,328 people, 6,791 households, and 4,189 families residing in the city. The population density was 4,342.6 inhabitants per square mile (1,676.7/km^{2}). There were 7,388 housing units at an average density of 1,964.9 per square mile (758.7/km^{2}). The racial makeup of the city was 86.44% White, 10.85% African American, 0.21% Asian, 0.18% Native American, 0.02% Pacific Islander, 0.23% from other races, and 2.08% from two or more races. Hispanic or Latino of any race were 0.88% of the population.

From the Census Ancestry Question, Sharon has the following ethnic make-up: German 21%, Irish 14%, Italian 11%, Black or African American 11%, English 8%, Polish 5%, Slovak 5%, Welsh 3%, Scots-Irish 2%, Hungarian 2%, Dutch 2%, French (except Basque) 2%, Croatian 1%, Scottish 1%, Russian 1%, Swedish 1%, Arab 1%, Slavic 1%, American Indian tribes, specified 1%. Sharon's Jewish community is served by the Reform Jewish Temple Beth Israel.

There were 6,791 households, out of which 28.1% had children under the age of 18 living with them, 40.7% were married couples living together, 16.6% had a female householder with no husband present, and 38.3% were non-families. 33.7% of all households were made up of individuals, and 15.5% had someone living alone who was 65 years of age or older. The average household size was 2.33 and the average family size was 2.97.

In the city, the population was distributed with 24.4% under the age of 18, 8.0% from 18 to 24, 27.2% from 25 to 44, 22.0% from 45 to 64, and 18.5% who were 65 years of age or older. The median age was 38 years. For every 100 females, there were 88.3 males. For every 100 females age 18 and over, there were 83.7 males.

The median income for a household in the city was $26,945, and the median income for a family was $34,581. Males had a median income of $30,072 versus $20,988 for females. The per capita income for the city was $15,913. About 14.0% of families and 17.6% of the population were below the poverty line, including 25.8% of those under age 18 and 8.8% of those age 65 or over.

== Arts and culture ==
The Frank H. Buhl Mansion is a historic mansion that was built in 1891 for the Buhl family, which owned the Sharon Iron Works. The ashlar sandstone residence has 2 1/2 storeys. Noted Youngstown architect Charles Henry Owsley (1846–1935) designed it in the Richardsonian Romanesque style. It was added to the National Register of Historic Places in 1977.

Shenango River Lake is a reservoir along the Shenango River. It is one of 16 flood control projects in the Pittsburgh district of the United States Army Corps of Engineers. It is a popular site for camping, fishing and outdoor recreation.

Sharon has hosted annual WaterFire festivals since 2013, a free public art installation designed by Barnaby Evans which consists of 80 burning braziers along the Shenango River in downtown Sharon. On average, WaterFire Sharon events host 40,000 visitors.

Sharon is the home of the original Quaker Steak & Lube, which opened in 1974, and formerly The Vocal Group Hall of Fame.

== Education ==
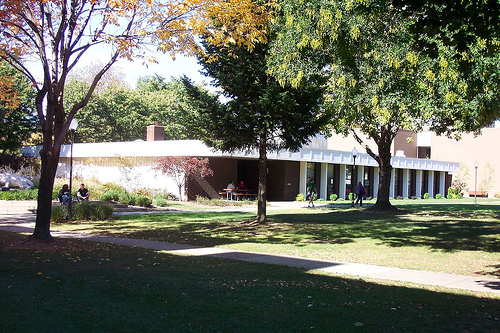
Science Building and Forker Laboratory on the Penn State Shenango Campus in Sharon

Children in Sharon are served by the Sharon City School District. The district colors are black and orange, and the school mascot is the Tiger. The following schools currently serve Sharon:

- Case Avenue Elementary School – grades K-6
- C.M. Musser Elementary School – grades K-6
- West Hill Elementary School – grades K-6
- Sharon Middle School – grades 7-8
- Sharon High School – grades 9-12

St. Joseph's School served as the parochial school for Sharon until 2011 when it closed as part of a merger between Notre Dame School and Kennedy Catholic High School to form the Kennedy Catholic Family of Schools. Parochial school students in Sharon now attend St. John Paul II Elementary School, Kennedy Catholic Middle School and Kennedy Catholic High School in nearby Hermitage.

Sharon is home to the Shenango campus of Pennsylvania State University, which offers several two-year and four-year degrees. It also hosts Laurel Technical Institute, a for-profit trade school, and the Sharon Regional Health System School of Nursing.

== Media ==
Because of Sharon's location on the Pennsylvania/Ohio border, it is served by WKBN-TV (CBS), WFMJ-TV (NBC), WYTV (ABC), WYFX-LD (Fox) and WBCB (CW), all broadcast from nearby Youngstown, OH.

Sharon is served by AM radio stations such as WLOA (1470 AM) (Farrell, PA), WPIC (790 AM), WKBN (570 AM) (Youngstown, OH), and by FM radio stations such as WYFM/"Y-103" (102.9 FM), WLLF/"Sportsradio" (96.7 FM) (Mercer, PA), WYLE/"Willie 95.1" (95.1 FM) (Grove City, PA), WMXY/"Mix 98.9" (98.9 FM) (Youngstown, OH) and WWIZ/"Z-104" (West Middlesex, PA).

== Notable people ==
- Mike Archie – former National Football League running back
- Carmen Argenziano – actor Stargate SG-1
- Teryl Austin – National Football League coach, Pittsburgh Steelers, Senior Defensive Assistant/Secondary coach
- Jane J. Boyle – judge
- Johnny Broderick – pianist, composer, songwriter, and one half of the vaudeville duo Arren and Broderick
- Frank H. Buhl – steel businessman and philanthropist
- Charles M. Bundel – US Army brigadier general
- Tony Butala – founder, lead vocalist, The Lettermen, president Vocal Group Hall of Fame
- Mike Connell – former National Football League punter
- John Daverio – professor of music
- Jonathan Dresel – Drummer for Jimmy Kimmel Live and his older brother Bernie Dresel, Grammy Award-winning LA studio drummer known for the Simpsons, Family Guy and many others.
- Nate Dunn – artist, Pennsylvania Impressionism School
- John H. Garvey – President, Catholic University of America (2010–2022)
- Charlie Gibson – catcher for the Philadelphia Athletics (1905)
- Bob Golub – stand-up comedian, actor, writer, filmmaker
- Mick Goodrick – jazz guitarist
- Erwin Hahn – physicist
- Randy Holloway – former National Football League defensive end
- Marc Howard – former Philadelphia news anchor
- Marlin Jackson – National Football League cornerback
- Benjamin Jarrett – Republican member of the U.S. House of Representatives
- Jane Katz – (born 1943), Olympic swimmer
- John Kiriakou – former CIA officer convicted of violating the Intelligence Identities Protection Act; notable in waterboarding debate
- Ty Longley – guitarist, Great White
- John D. MacDonald – best-selling crime novelist
- Jack Marin – former National Basketball Association player
- Paul McKee – professor and author of children's reading primers
- Hugh McKinnis – former Canadian Football League and National Football League running back
- Bill Murray – nationally syndicated cartoonist and children book illustrator
- Grover Norquist - founder and president, Americans for Tax Reform
- Lester Rawlins – actor
- Sean Rowe – Presiding Bishop of the Episcopal Church of America
- Mike Sebastian – former halfback in the National Football League and second American Football League
- Frank Secich – author, rock musician and member of the group Blue Ash
- Hershel Shanks – founder, Biblical Archaeology Society, editor, Biblical Archaeology Review
- Willie Somerset – ABA All-Star professional basketball player
- Lorenzo Styles – former linebacker for Atlanta Falcons and St. Louis Rams; head coach for the Marion Blue Racers
- James Henry Taylor – professor of mathematics
- Leo Yankevich – poet, translator, editor of The New Formalist

== See also ==
- Buhl Farm Golf Course
- Buhl Mansion
- Penn State Shenango Campus
- Sharon City School District
- Vocal Group Hall of Fame
