= City Seminary of Sacramento =

Seminary in Sacramento, California, US

Coordinates: 38.536°N 121.492°W

City Seminary of Sacramento is a conservative, evangelical seminary in Sacramento, California.

== History ==
Established in 2000, it offers a seminary education to students from a variety of denominational backgrounds. It is dedicated to the philosophy that "no student called to the preaching ministry should be denied an education for financial reasons." Since its founding, the seminary has raised private funding to supply all scholarship requests, and as a matter of policy, forbids students to go into debt to pay for tuition.

In 2021, the Board of Governors approved the launch of the Seminario Reformado de las Américas, based in Quito, Ecuador, offering a similar tuition debt-free program for Spanish-speaking students in North and South America. All faculty are drawn from the Reformed Church in the United States, United Reformed Churches in North America, Presbyterian Church of America, and Reformed Presbyterian Church of North America. The City Seminary student body was initially drawn largely from among the Sacramento area's minority communities and catered primarily to older working students with families that could not afford to leave their employment and travel to a distant seminary,, but today draws students to its online classes and degree programs both in the United States, and internationally. Seminario Reformado de las Américas offers both the MDiv, Master of Arts in Theology, snd Bachelor of Divinity through distance learning.

City Seminary grants undergraduate divinity, as well as Master of Divinity degrees. City Seminary of Sacramento is accredited by the Association of Reformed Theological Seminaries (ARTS), under oversight of the Council for Higher Education Accreditation (CHEA). The curriculum is a classical Reformed studies program that emphasizes proficiency in Greek and Hebrew, with a strong emphasis on presuppositional apologetics and biblical inerrancy. Either men or women may enroll in most classes and programs, but the Bachelor of Divinity and Master of Divinity degree are awarded only to men for theological reasons.
