= Sharon City School District =

School district in Pennsylvania, USA

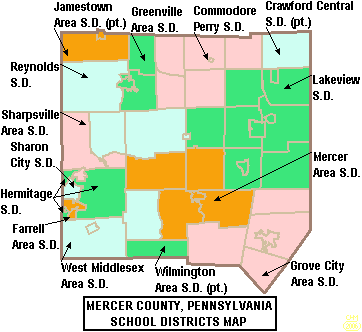

Address
- 215 Forker Boulevard Sharon, Pennsylvania, 16146; United States

District information
- Type: Public school district
- Motto: Tradition. Innovation. Excellence.
- Grades: KG–12
- Schools: 5
- NCES District ID: 4221330

Students and staff
- Enrollment: 1,882 (2022–23)
- Teachers: 164.20 (on an FTE basis)
- Student–teacher ratio: 11.46

Other information
- Website: www.sharon.k12.pa.us

The Sharon City School District is a small, urban, public school district serving the city of Sharon on the western edge of the U.S. state of Pennsylvania.

== Description ==
Sharon City School District encompasses approximately 5 square miles (13 km^{2}). According to 2000 United States census data, it serves a resident population of 16,328. In 2009, the district residents’ per capita income was $15,913, while the median family income was $34,581. In the Commonwealth, the median family income was $49,501 and the United States median family income was $49,445, in 2010. By 2010, Sharon City School District's population declined to 14,028 people.

In school year 2022–23, the Sharon City School District provided basic educational services to 1,882 pupils through the employment of 164.20 full-time equivalent teachers.

Sharon City School District currently operates four schools:

- Case Avenue Elementary School (grades K-6) built 1923, expanded 1950, renovated 1976 demolished 2011, rebuilt 2013
- C.M. Musser Elementary School (grades K-6) built 1958, renovated and expanded 2000
- West Hill Elementary School (grades K-6) built 1961, renovated and expanded 2000
- Sharon Middle-High School (grades 7–12) built 1969, renovated 2003

== Extracurriculars ==
Sharon City School District offers a wide variety of clubs, activities and an extensive sports program.

=== Sports ===
The District funds:

Boys

- Baseball - AA
- Basketball- AAA
- Cross Country - AA
- Football - AA
- Golf - AA
- Soccer - AA
- Swimming and Diving - AA
- Tennis - AA
- Track and Field - AA
- Wrestling - AA

Girls

- Basketball - AA
- Cross Country - AA
- Soccer (Fall) - A
- Softball - AA
- Swimming and Diving - AA
- Girls' Tennis - AA
- Track and Field - AA
- Volleyball - AA

Middle School Sports:

Boys

- Basketball
- cross Country
- Football
- Soccer
- Track and Field
- Wrestling

Girls

- Basketball
- Cross Country
- Soccer
- Track and Field
- Volleyball
