= Biblical Archaeology Society =

Non-denominational organization that supports and promotes biblical archaeology

The Biblical Archaeology Society was established in 1974 by American lawyer Hershel Shanks, as a non-sectarian organisation that supports and promotes biblical archaeology. Its current publications include the Biblical Archaeology Review, whilst previously circulating the Bible Review (1985–2005) and Archaeology Odyssey (1998–2006). The Biblical Archaeology Society also publishes books about biblical archaeology aimed at a general readership. The Society has, for more than 45 years, run seminars and tours offering an opportunity to learn directly from archaeologists and scholars. It also produced videos (DVD) and CDs on archaeology and biblical archaeology.

The Biblical Archaeology Society has gained global traction through its popular publication The Biblical Archaeology Review. It has also been involved in multiple authenticity scandals.

== History ==
The Biblical Archaeology society was founded by lawyer, turned amateur archaeologist, Hershel Shanks in 1974. Despite having never studied archeology or religion, Shanks was inspired by a year-long sabbatical to the archaeological digs of Jerusalem. Upon his return, Hershel published an article in The Israel Exploration Journal and approached U.S magazines hoping to produce a similar suite of columns regarding biblical archeology. These propositions were rejected, which led Shanks to establish his own publication, Biblical Archeology Newsletter. In 1974, the Biblical Archeology Society was a recognised nonprofit corporation and by 1975, the group had published its first edition of the new Biblical Archaeology Review. Shanks considered himself as an 'outsider' of the field and attributes Israeli archaeologist Yigael Yadin as crucial in assisting his early efforts in making archaeology accessible through the society. It was these early publications that Shanks suggests have led to now infamous excavation sites, such as David's burial palace and the entrance to Hezekiah's Tunnel. Shanks suggested that his desire was merely to publish 'a little newsletter about Israel as a land of stones' and that the subsequent successful circulation of the review was 'a dream'. By the early 2000s, the Biblical Archaeology Society had reached its peak of 250,000 subscribers and had earned Shanks a position as "the world's most influential amateur biblical archaeologist." The Biblical Archaeology Society, along with its founder, has been said to have 'transformed… the trajectory' of not only archaeological studies, but the understanding of 'Jewish and Christian worlds'.

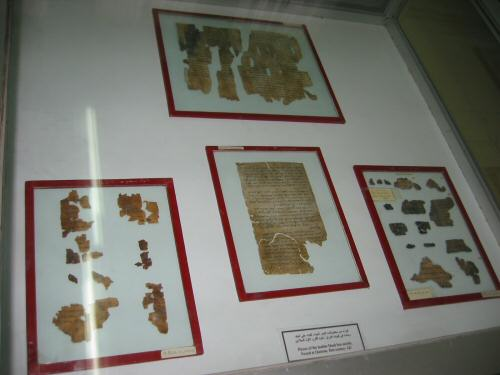
An image of the discovered Dead Sea Scrolls framed in the Museum of the Bible, Washington D.C.

In 1985, the Biblical Archaeology Society, under the direction of Shanks, focused its operations on the accessibility of the Dead Sea Scrolls. The scrolls formed some of the oldest biblical writings, and as such, were deemed crucial in illuminating the development of both Christianity and Judaism. However, Shanks took issue with the 'monopoly' over access to the scrolls, given to a select group within Israel's Antiquities Department. The Biblical Archaeology Review had characterised the push for access as a "matter of intellectual freedom and the right to scholarly access". By 1991, the scrolls became widely publicised after the Biblical Archaeology Society published a two-volume of the scroll photographs and a computer generated version in a "final act in the drama to access the Dead Sea Scrolls". By 2001, the society had released almost all the transcriptions from the Scrolls to the general public, which was said to have 'changed the rules of the game' regarding public access to hushed archaeological finds.

Shanks served as editor for 42 years, retiring at the end of 2017. Robert R. Cargill was selected to replace Shanks as editor of the Society and associated publications in 2018. Cargill stepped down in 2021 and was replaced by Glenn J. Corbett. Hershel Shanks died in 2021, apparently due to the Covid-19 virus.

== Activities ==
=== The Biblical Archaeology Review ===
The Biblical Archaeology Society is the publisher of its own magazine, Biblical Archaeology Review, which has generated extensive public following. BAR is both nonsectarian and "non-academic" and as such, has been attributed with setting the agenda for discourse surrounding issues relating to both the Bible and archaeological matters. Shanks declared that he saw an overall failure in experts publishing the results of their excavations, and as such, sought to remedy this through the creation of BAR. Contributors to the Biblical Archaeology Review are that of scholars, researchers and archaeological experts. The Society's review has been suggested to have "a kind of de facto control" over mainstream media regarding biblical archaeological endeavours and as such, is considered "the gate keeper" for most major news outlets.

The review discusses both the latest discovers and controversies of the archaeological field, providing a multi-medic publication with photography, maps and diagrams. It is through this publication that the Biblical Archaeology Society has raised the important need to publish the Dead Sea Scrolls in an egalitarian fashion. BAR also promoted a renewed comprehensive archaeological analysis on the Temple Mount, in addition to a report on matters of litigation, regarding a lawsuit involving Muslims accused of destroying a historic site for three of the world's major faiths. In addition, the publication allows for a forum in which the analytical studies of important biblical artefacts can be questioned.

The content of The Biblical Archaeology Review is considered to articulate the academic field of archaeology and biblical studies in a manner that is understood and easily digested to a broader general audience. That is, their publication has been argued as a palliative for the archaeology field's lost ability to communicate beyond the academy itself and for bridging the gap between academic scholarship and the lay public's desire for key archaeological questions. The review was said to have "simplified esoteric" scholarship and writings, to which they were attributed with "tantalising headlines". The Society's delivery of archaeological news through the Biblical Archaeology Review has been suggested to use sensationalist tactics.

The Biblical Archaeology Society has produced an additional two smaller publications, publishing the Bible Review from 1985 to 2005 and Archaeology Odyssey from 1998 to 2006. The Society also publishes the daily blog Bible History Daily and hosts lecture series and site tours with prominent scholars in the fields of archaeology and biblical studies.

=== Meetings ===
The Biblical Archaeology Society is the host of annual seminars and meetings in which contemporary archaeological and biblical matters are discussed. In doing this, they compete with other archaeological conferences and organisations, such as American Society of Overseas Research and the Society for Biblical Literature. Biblical Archaeology Society seminars and meetings are presented for a broad public with interest in biblical archaeology, unlike ASOR and SBL and others, whose meetings are targeted to scholars and working archaeologists.

=== Excavations and discoveries ===
The Biblical Archeology Society adopts a historical archaeology approach to their excavations, whereby their researchers seek to understand the relationship between sacred or ancient texts and the geography in which they are found. The Biblical Archaeology Society publishes an annual Digs Guide, which lists upcoming excavation projects in Israel and Jordan for which volunteers are welcome to apply to join. Additionally, the Society offers an ongoing Scholarship Program which provides funding for individuals to participate in excavations.

The Biblical Archaeology Society has collaborated on and conducted multiple excavations, including that of the Umayri and Tall Jalul Reubenite sites. Their contributions to the Umayri excavation assisted in developing a greater understanding surrounding the biblical genealogies and nature of the settlement process in relation to the Hebrew tribe of Reuben. Similarly, during the excavation of Tall Jalal numerous fragmentary specimens were uncovered, including iconographic figurines of animals representative as deities or apotropaic forces. The Society's excavations led to the discovery and opening of "Jerusalem's newest archaeological attraction", directed by one of its founding members Eilat Mazar. The Ophel City Wall site was discovered to lie below the Temple Mount and above the City of David, further leading to revelations surrounding one of the Bible’s most coveted kings, Solomon. Subsequently, in 2009 the Society announced, in an addition of the Biblical Archaeology Review, its discovery in Ophel of a clay seal (bulla) dated to the 8th century BC ruler, King Hezekiah. Discovered by Eilat Mazar, the bulla was deemed as being inscribed with the name of Isaiah, one of the most important Old Testament prophets. However, some scholars contest the biblical origins of the bulla as the prophet is not referred to as a definite article, merely "prophet", not "the prophet".

== Controversies ==
=== Ivory pomegranate ===
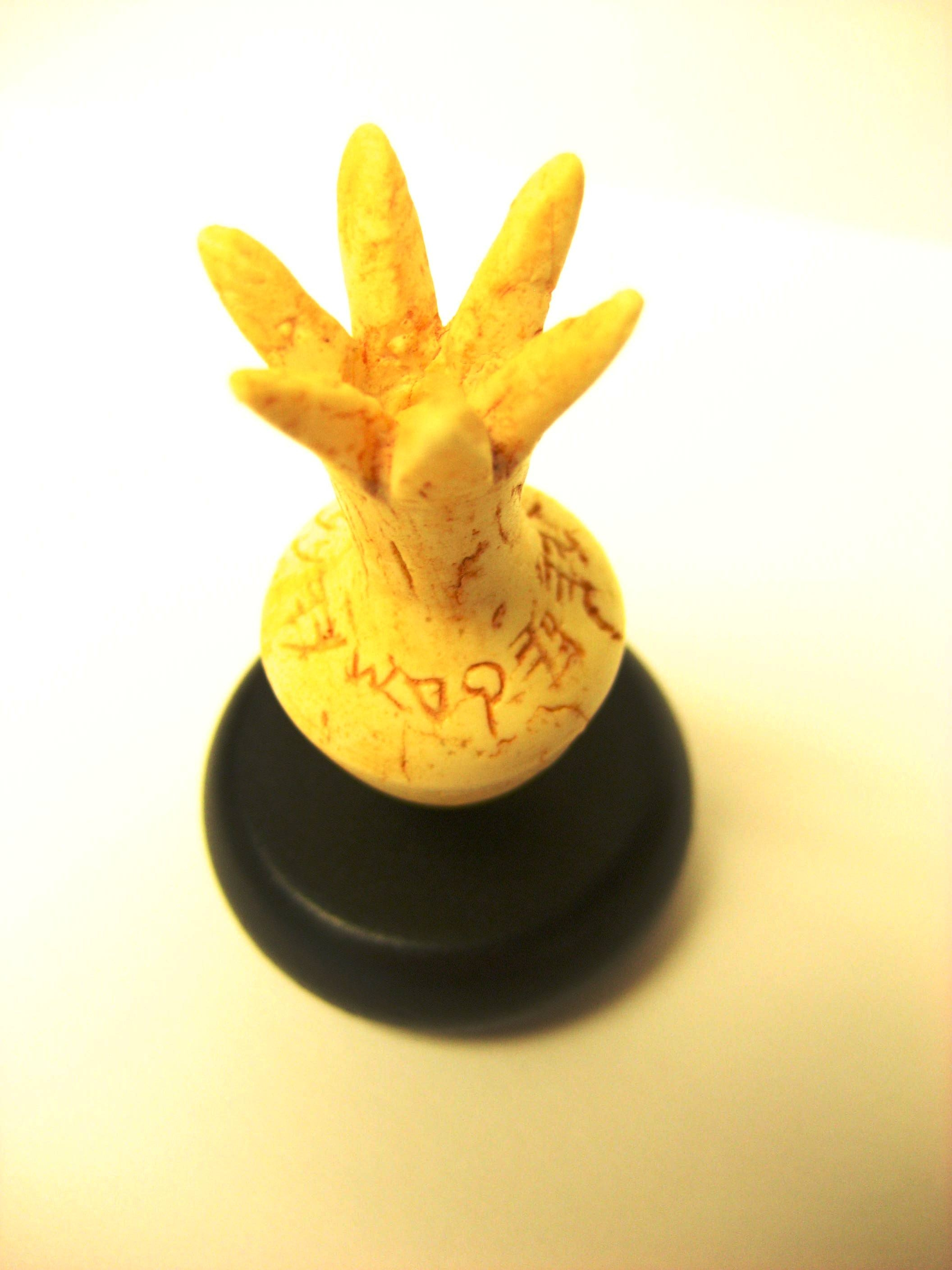
A photo of the reconstructed artifact

The Biblical Archaeology Society and its founder Hershel Shanks were first involved in a dispute of authenticity after the discovery of an ivory pomegranate with the inscription "Holy to the priests, belonging to the Temple of Yahweh", said to be the only remaining artefact from the First Temple of Solomon. After being purchased by academic epigraphist André Lemaire in a Jerusalem antiquities dealership for US$3,000, Shanks provided an accessible account of the pomegranate's discovery in the Biblical Archaeology Review. The pomegranate went on to sell for an inflated price, to which Shanks claimed credit due to its promotion in the Biblical Archaeology Society's publication. However, the Israel Antiquities Authority later deemed the inscription a fake and charged Lemaire with forgery.

=== The Limestone Ossuary ===
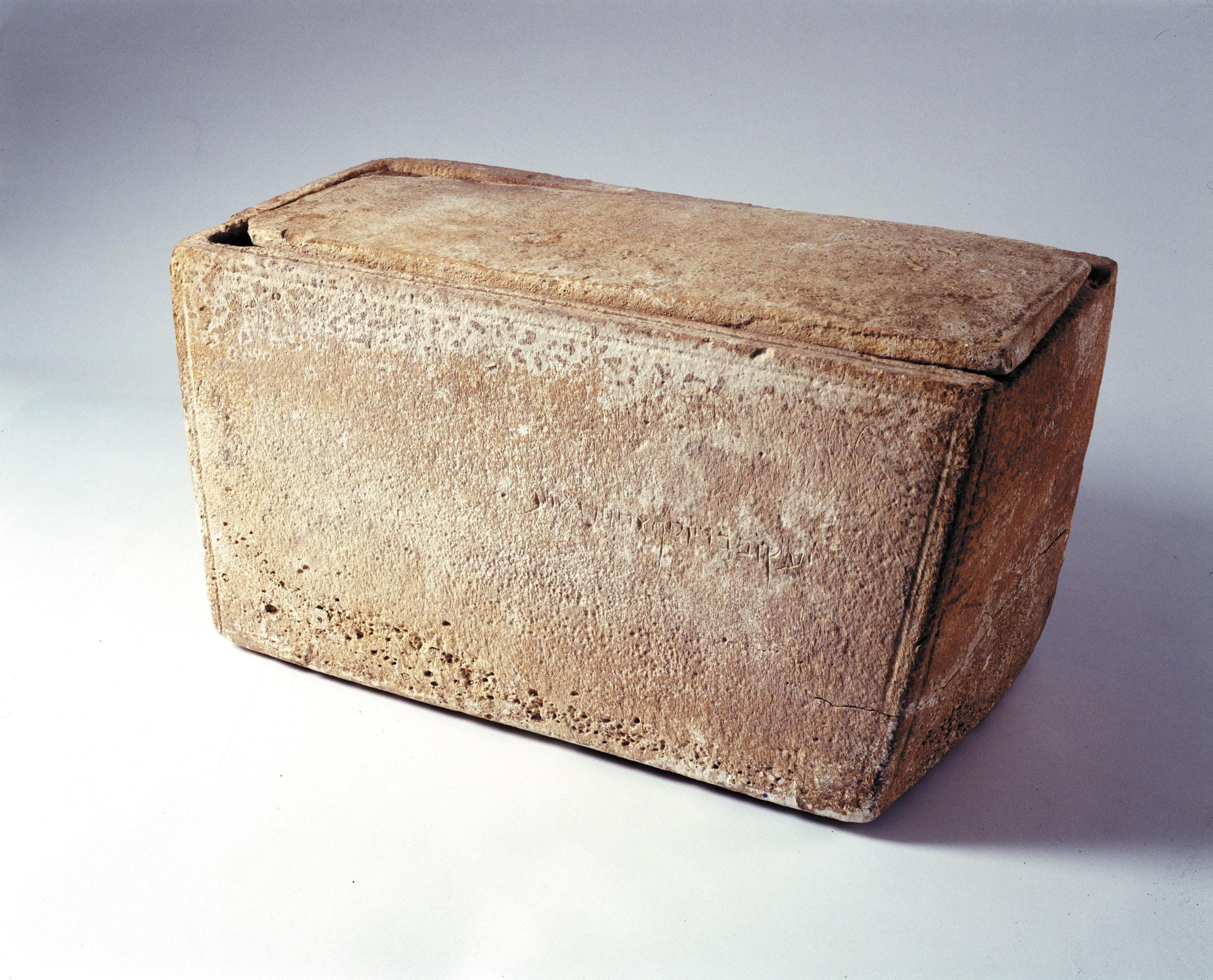
The limestone ossuary attributed to James, the brother of Jesus.

The Biblical Archaeology Society was subsequently involved in a global scandal, again regarding matters of authenticity surrounding items authenticated by Lemaire. In May 2002, Tel Aviv engineer Oded Golan purchased a limestone ossuary (burial box) from the 1st century, adorned with the Aramaic inscription "James, Son of Joseph, Brother of Jesus". Realising the potential significance of the piece, Golan invited Lemaire to examine the ossuary’s inscriptions. Lemaire and the Biblical Archaeology Society presented the ossuary to the Geological Survey of Israel for analysis, to which they found no reason to doubt its authenticity. Subsequently, in 2002 Lemaire published an ‘exclusive’ article on his find in an issue of the Biblical Archaeology Review. The following day, the Ossuary has cause a media frenzy and featured in major newspapers around the world, including The New York Times and The Washington Post. Subsequently, the Society collaborated with the Royal Ontario Museum to exhibit the ossuary, attracting 95,000 visitors and generating Shanks alone US$28,000. The Biblical Archaeology Society subsequently published a book and sold the television rights of the Ossuary, generating a documentary that was later released on DVD. The Society was suggested to have commercially exploited the object, without technically owning the Ossuary.

The box's revelation ignited divided opinions amongst scholars, with some archaeologists promptly and publicly questioned the authenticity of the ossuary due to its purchasing from an antiquities dealer, rather than being excavated under controlled conditions by professional archaeologists. Again, the Israel Antiquities Authority deemed the Ossuary to be a forgery and that the inscription was a modern addition to an ancient limestone casket. The Authority suggested that the discovery was "the fraud of the century". The Ossuary's original dealer was subsequently charged, and later acquitted, for operating an international forgery ring and for faking the inscription in question. It has been suggested that his acquittal was a matter of an underfunded prosecution and an in-comprehensive investigation, with the judge conceding that the trial did not necessarily prove the objects authenticity. Shanks and his society were deemed 'the loudest supporters' of the object, particularly evident in their continual public persecution of scholars who deem the Ossuary to be forgery. Shanks maintains that scepticism surrounding the ossuary's authenticity can be deduced to two scientists on the committee for the Israeli Antiquities Authority, Professor Yuval Goren and Dr Avner Ayalon. Regarding the Biblical Archaeology Society's ongoing insistence of the Ossuary's authenticity, some scholars have suggested at the financial motives and public exposure gained through its legitimacy. The authenticity of the ossuary remains undetermined, as whilst the individuals involved were acquitted, the judge refused to rule on the alleged forgery itself.

=== Dead Sea Scrolls ===
Whilst the Biblical Archaeology Society was decisive in the releasing of the Dead Sea Scrolls, in August 2000, Israeli scholar Elisha Qimron brought forth a suit against them for infringement of copyright, material and moral, in their publication of A Facsimile of the Dead Sea Scrolls. Qimron objected to both the publication of a working composite scroll text 'MMT' of which for years he had been actively engaged in translating, in addition to the publications forward whereby Shanks alluded to the preventative and controlling behaviours of interested scholars. Shanks and the Biblical Archaeology Society refuted this claim, suggesting that the work was published in an attempt to illuminate "how hard the establishment was working to keep things to themselves." This argument was quashed by the District Court in that they suggested Shanks had confused "the right to research the Scroll … with the taking of another person's work." Shanks, through the Biblical Archeology Society had been selling the volumes of photos for $195 a set. The court ruled that the Biblical Archaeology Society was to halt distribution of its two-volume compilation of Dead Sea Scroll photographs in Israel. The Judge concluded that Qimron did in fact have copyright to his work due to the necessary assembly of 'MMT' depending on linguistic research, consisting original creation. Subsequently, Shanks and the Biblical Archeology Society were sued over copyright violation and liable for $100,000 in damages due to loss of publishing royalties, loss of income, mental anguish and injury to Qimron's reputation.

In his 2010 autobiography Freeing the Dead Sea Scrolls: And Other Adventures of an Archaeology Outsider, Shanks addresses events and admits that the Biblical Archaeology Society was often charged with accusations of "controversy". The book also discusses yet another controversy the society was involved in, whereby it was associated with the discovery of the Yehoash Plaque, a 15-line Hebrew inscription that was also deemed a forgery. However, Shanks goes on to accuse the Israel Antiquities Authority of "engaging in politicised archaeology" on matters of authenticity.
