= Biblical Archaeology Review =

American quarterly magazine

- Editor: Glenn J. Corbett
- Categories: Archaeology
- Frequency: Quarterly
- Circulation: 118,000
- Publisher: Biblical Archaeology Society
- Founder: Hershel Shanks
- Founded: 1975
- Country: United States
- Based in: Washington, D.C.
- Website: www.biblicalarchaeology.org/magazine/
- ISSN: 0098-9444

Biblical Archaeology Review, sometimes referred to as BAR, is a quarterly magazine. It seeks to connect the academic study of archaeology to a broad general audience seeking to understand the world of the Bible, the Near East, and the Middle East (Syro-Palestine and the Levant). Since its first issue in 1975, Biblical Archaeology Review has covered the latest discoveries and controversies in the archaeology of Israel, Turkey, Jordan and the surrounding regions as well as the newest scholarly insights into both the Hebrew Bible and the New Testament. The magazine is published by the nonsectarian and nonprofit Biblical Archaeology Society (BAS).

== Sister publications ==
Bible Review was also published by BAS from 1985 to 2005, with the goal of communicating the academic study of the Bible to a broad general audience. Covering both the Old and New Testaments, Bible Review presented critical and historical interpretations of biblical texts, and "reader-friendly Biblical scholarship". After 2005, Bible Review merged into BAR.

Archaeology Odyssey was published from 1997 to 2005, covering classical archaeology.

== Online access ==
The full runs of both Bible Review and Archaeology Odyssey, plus every issue of BAR since 1975, are available to Biblical Archaeology Society All Access Members in the BAS Library.

== Editors-in-chief ==
From its founding in 1975 until 2017, the editor-in-chief was Hershel Shanks. After Shanks' retirement at the end of 2017, Robert R. Cargill was selected as the next editor. Cargill stepped down in March 2021 and was replaced by Glenn J. Corbett.

- Hershel Shanks (1975–2018)
- Robert R. Cargill (2018–2021)
- Glenn J. Corbett (since 2021)

== Publishers ==
- Hershel Shanks (1975–2003)
- Susan Laden (since 2004)
