= Pennsylvania Route 718 =

State highway in Mercer County, Pennsylvania, US

Pennsylvania Route 718

Route information
- Maintained by PennDOT
- Length: 11.113 mi (17.885 km)
- Existed: 1930–present

Major junctions
- South end: PA 318 in Shenango Township
- PA 418 / PA 760 in Wheatland US 62 / US 62 Bus. in Sharon; PA 846 in Hermitage
- North end: SR 305 at the Ohio state line near Hartford, OH

Location
- Country: United States
- State: Pennsylvania
- Counties: Mercer

Highway system
- Pennsylvania State Route System; Interstate; US; State; Scenic; Legislative
← PA 715	→ PA 722

Pennsylvania Route 718 (PA 718) is an 11.1-mile-long (17.9 km) state highway located in Mercer County, Pennsylvania. The southern terminus is at PA 318 in Shenango Township. The northern terminus is the Ohio state line in South Pymatuning Township.

== Route description ==
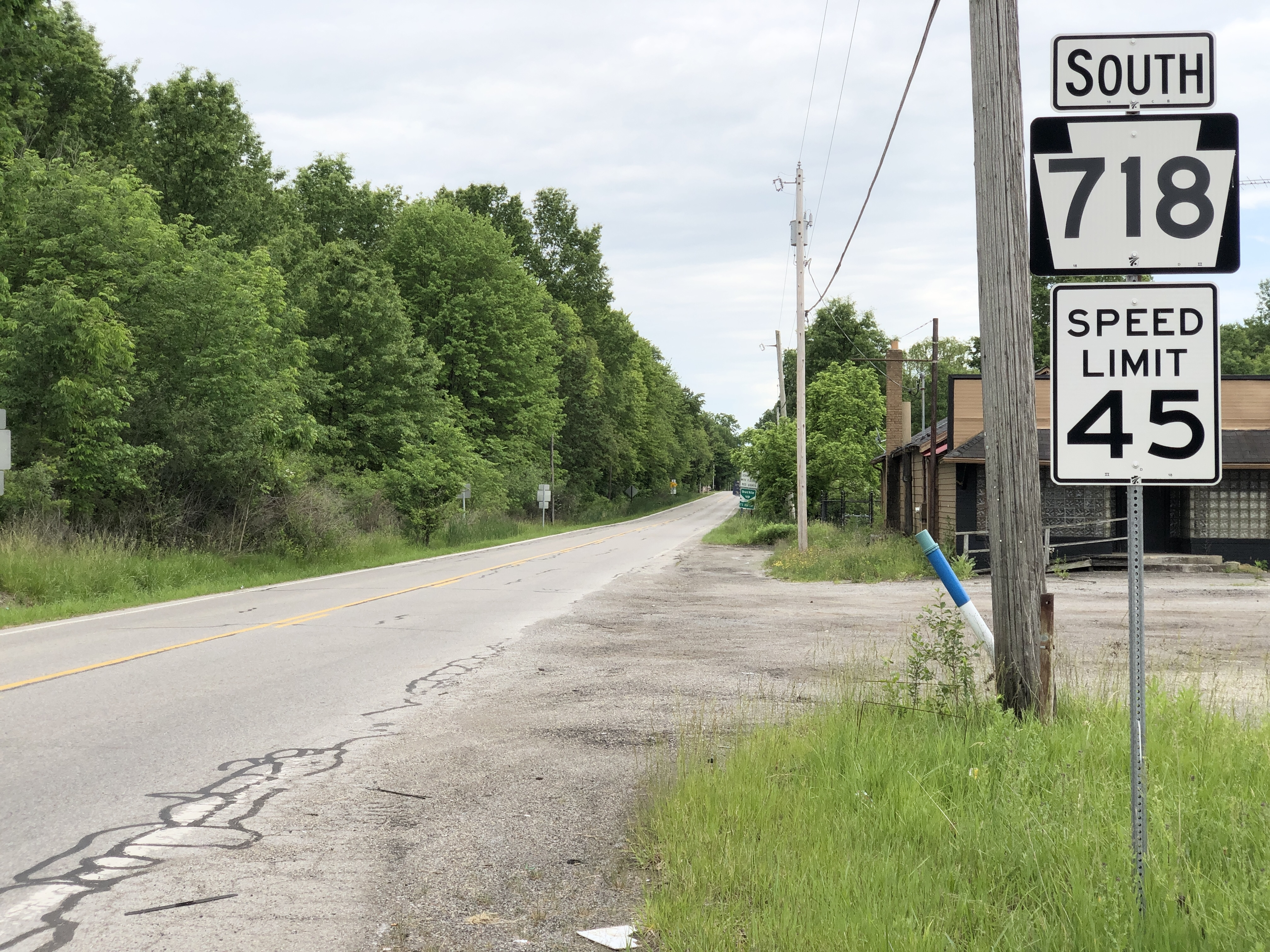
PA 718 eastbound past SR 305 at the Ohio state line in South Pymatuning Township

PA 718 begins at an intersection with PA 318 in Shenango Township, heading north on two-lane undivided Seig Hill Road. The road runs through wooded areas with some homes, passing under I-80. The route passes through agricultural areas prior to crossing the Shenango River into the borough of Wheatland. At this point, PA 718 becomes Council Street and heads through industrial areas, crossing Norfolk Southern's Wheatland Industrial Track railroad line. Farther north, PA 718 reaches an intersection with PA 418 and PA 760. At this intersection, PA 418 continues north along Council Street and PA 718 turns west to form a concurrency with PA 760 on Broadway Road. The two routes pass residential areas to the north and industrial areas to the south with a few businesses. The road enters the city of Farrell and turns to the north, continuing to the west of developed neighborhoods and to the east of the Norfolk Southern railroad line as it passes more industry, including a large steel mill. PA 718/PA 760 crosses into the city of Sharon, where the road becomes Dock Street and passes under US 62, with a connection provided by local streets. From here, the road continues into downtown Sharon and reaches an intersection with US 62 Business.

At this junction, PA 760 ends and PA 718 makes a left turn to head west on US 62 Business. The two routes run along East State Street through the commercial downtown, crossing Norfolk Southern's Wheatland Industrial Track before heading across the Shenango River and becoming West State Street. PA 718 splits from US 62 Business by heading north along North Water Avenue. The road passes through industrial areas along the western bank of the Shenango River, crossing Norfolk Southern's Meadville Line. Farther north, the route passes homes to the west and riverside industry to the east, becoming the border between the city of Hermitage to the west and Sharon to the east. PA 718 fully enters Hermitage and heads through forested areas with a few homes, coming to an intersection with the southern terminus of PA 846. The route continues north from this point and enters South Pymatuning Township, where the road name becomes Ivanhoe Road. The road passes through more wooded areas of residences before heading into more agricultural surroundings. PA 718 turns northwest onto Tamarack Drive and passes through a mix of woods and farms with a few homes, reaching the Ohio border. At this point, the road continues west into Ohio as SR 305.

== Major intersections ==
The entire route is in Mercer County.

Location	mi	km	Destinations	Notes
Shenango Township	0.000	0.000	PA 318 (Hubbard–Middlesex Road)	Southern terminus
Wheatland	2.150	3.460	PA 418 north (Council Street) / PA 760 south (Broadway Avenue)	Southern end of PA 760 concurrency; southern terminus of PA 418
Sharon	4.741– 4.800	7.630– 7.725	US 62	Roundabout; access via Connelly Boulevard
Sharon	4.884	7.860	US 62 Bus. (East State Street) PA 760 ends	Northern terminus of PA 760; southern end of US 62 Bus. concurrency
Sharon	5.158	8.301	US 62 Bus. (West State Street)	Northern end of US 62 Bus. concurrency
Hermitage	7.147	11.502	PA 846 north (River Road)	Southern terminus of PA 846
South Pymatuning Township	11.113	17.885	SR 305 west	Continuation into Ohio
1.000 mi = 1.609 km; 1.000 km = 0.621 mi: Concurrency terminus
