= Pennsylvania Route 318 =

State highway in Mercer County, Pennsylvania, US

Pennsylvania Route 318

Route information
- Maintained by PennDOT
- Length: 15.916 mi (25.614 km)

Major junctions
- West end: SR 304 at the Ohio state line near West Middlesex
- I-376 in West Middlesex
- East end: PA 158 in Mercer

Location
- Country: United States
- State: Pennsylvania
- Counties: Mercer

Highway system
- Pennsylvania State Route System; Interstate; US; State; Scenic; Legislative
| ← PA 317 | → PA 319 |

Pennsylvania Route 318 (PA 318) is a 15.9-mile-long (25.6 km) state highway located in Mercer County, Pennsylvania. The western terminus is at the Ohio state line in Shenango Township near West Middlesex where the road continues as Ohio State Route 304. The eastern terminus is at PA 158 in Mercer.

== Route description ==
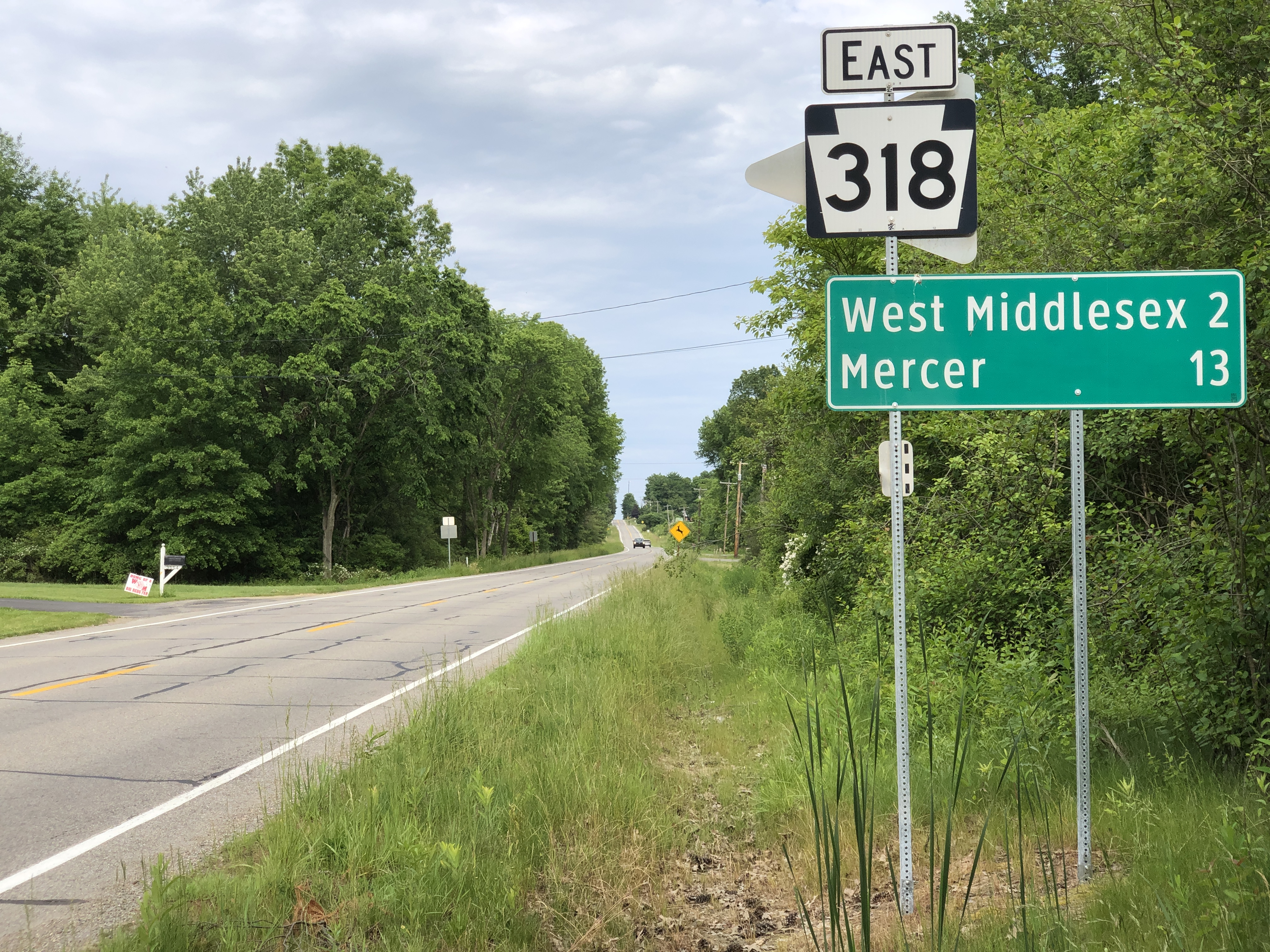
PA 318 eastbound past PA 718 in Shenango Township

PA 318 begins at the Ohio border in Shenango Township, where the road continues west into that state as SR 304. From the state line, the route heads east on two-lane undivided Hubbard-Middlesex Road, passing through areas of farms and woods with some homes. PA 318 reaches an intersection with PA 718 and continues through more forested areas with residences. The route heads into the borough of West Middlesex and becomes Main Street, crossing the Shenango River into residential and commercial areas. In the center of town, the road crosses PA 18. PA 318 continues past more homes prior to heading back into Shenango Township, where it becomes Mercer West Middlesex Road. The route heads east-northeast through rural areas of residences, reaching an interchange with I-376.

Past this interchange, PA 318 continues through areas of farmland and woodland with homes, passing under I-80. The road continues into Lackawannock Township and runs through the communities of Bethel and Greenfield. Upon heading into East Lackawannock Township, the route curves south then east, passing through agricultural areas. PA 318 passes through a mix of fields and forests as it turns northeast onto Pulaski Mercer Road. The road makes a curve east and enters the borough of Mercer, where the name becomes West Butler Street. In Mercer, PA 318 passes homes before reaching its eastern terminus at PA 158.

== Major intersections ==
The entire route is in Mercer County.

| Location | mi | km | Destinations | Notes |
|---|---|---|---|---|
| Shenango Township | 0.000 | 0.000 | SR 304 west (East Liberty Street) – Hubbard | Western terminus of PA 318 at Ohio state line |
| Shenango Township | 1.348 | 2.169 | PA 718 north (Seig Hill Road) – Wheatland, Sharon | Southern terminus of PA 718 |
| West Middlesex | 3.495 | 5.625 | PA 18 (Sharon Road) | |
| Shenango Township | 4.279 | 6.886 | I-376 (Beaver Valley Expressway) to I-80 – Hermitage, Sharon | Exit 1C (I-376), originally westbound entrance to / eastbound exit from I-376 only. Became a full interchange in October 2014. |
| Mercer | 15.916 | 25.614 | PA 158 (South Shenango Street) | Eastern terminus of PA 318 |
1.000 mi = 1.609 km; 1.000 km = 0.621 mi

== PA 318 Alternate Truck ==
PA Route 318 Alternate Truck
- Location: Mercer County, Pennsylvania
- Existed: 2013–2018

Pennsylvania Route 318 Alternate Truck is a truck route around a weight-restricted bridge over the Little Neshannock Creek on which trucks over 33 tons and combination loads over 39 tons are prohibited. The route follows PA 18, US 62, and PA 158. The route was signed in 2013, but it was decommissioned in 2018 following a bridge repair.
