= Pennsylvania Route 760 =

State highway in Mercer County, Pennsylvania, US

Pennsylvania Route 760

Route information
- Maintained by PennDOT
- Length: 5.419 mi (8.721 km)
- Existed: 2009–present

Major junctions
- South end: I-80 / I-376 in Shenango Township
- PA 18 in Shenango Township; PA 418 / PA 718 in Hermitage
- North end: US 62 / US 62 Bus. / PA 718 in Sharon

Location
- Country: United States
- State: Pennsylvania
- Counties: Mercer

Highway system
- Pennsylvania State Route System; Interstate; US; State; Scenic; Legislative
← PA 756	→ PA 763

Pennsylvania Route 760 (PA 760) is a state highway located in Mercer County, Pennsylvania. The route runs from an interchange with Interstate 80 (I-80) and I-376 in Shenango Township to an intersection with U.S. Route 62 Business (US 62 Bus.) and PA 718 in Sharon. The road was designated as the northernmost part of PA 60 until 2009, when I-376 was extended from the Pittsburgh area to I-80 along PA 60.

== Route description ==
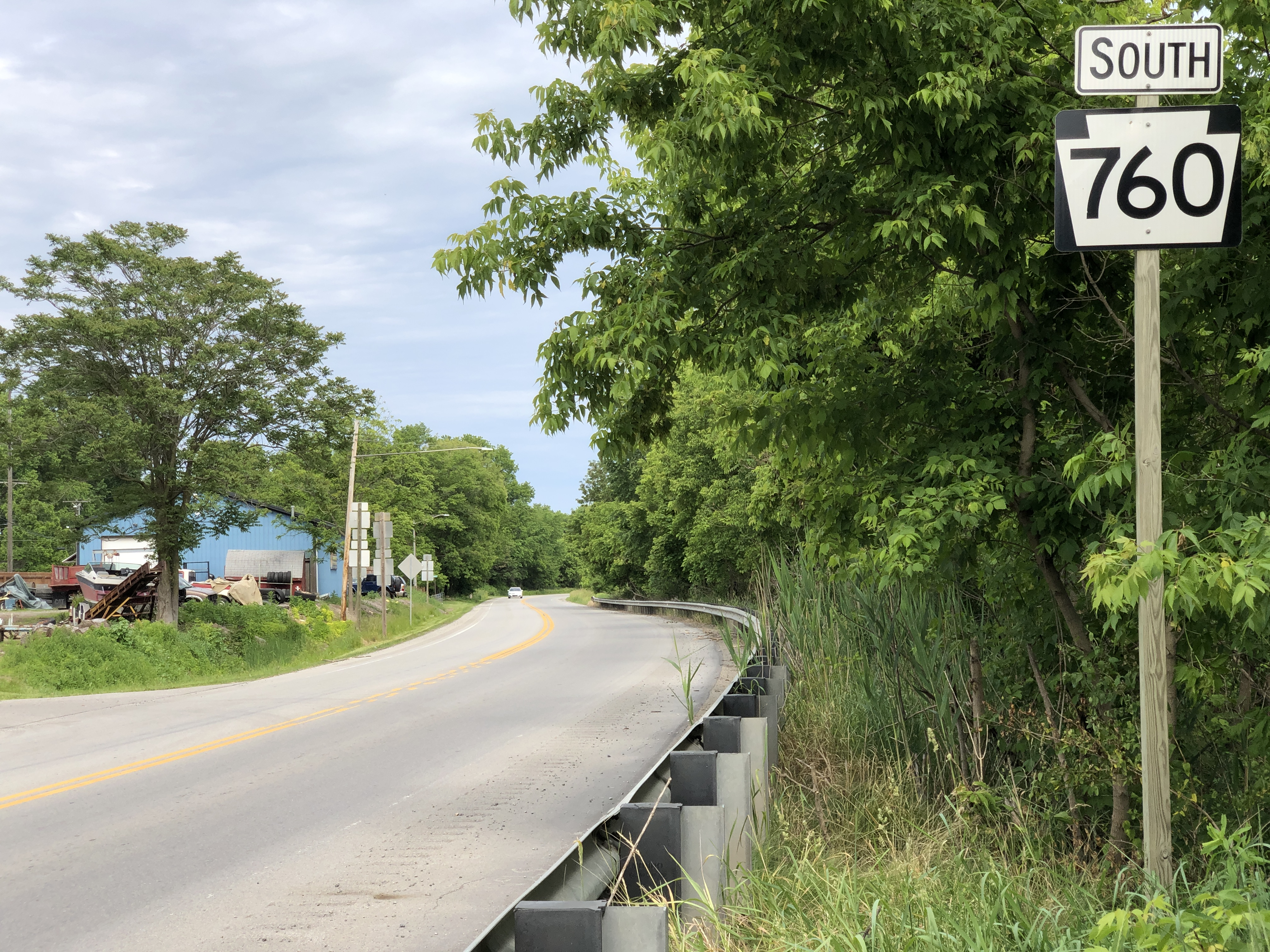
PA 760 southbound past PA 418/PA 718 in Wheatland

PA 760 begins at an interchange with I-80 and I-376 in Shenango Township, heading to the west as a four-lane freeway. South of here, the road continues as I-376. A short distance after beginning, the route reaches the PA 18 interchange, at which point the freeway ends. From this point, PA 760 turns to the northwest and becomes two-lane undivided Broadway Avenue. The road enters the city of Hermitage and passes a mix of woods and industrial establishments. The route turns more to the west as it comes into the former borough of Wheatland (now part of Hermitage) and intersects PA 718 and the southern terminus of PA 418. At this intersection, PA 718 forms a concurrency with PA 760, and the two routes pass residential areas to the north and industrial areas to the south with a few businesses. The road enters the city of Farrell and turns to the north, continuing to the west of developed neighborhoods and to the east of Norfolk Southern's Wheatland Industrial Track railroad line as it passes more industry, including a large steel mill. PA 718/PA 760 crosses into the city of Sharon, where the road becomes Dock Street and passes under US 62, with a connection provided by local streets. From here, the road continues into downtown Sharon and reaches a roundabout at Connelly Boulevard and an intersection with US 62 Business. At this junction, PA 760 ends and PA 718 makes a left turn to head west on US 62 Business.

== History ==
What is now PA 760 was originally designated as solely PA 718 and as an unnumbered road east of the PA 418/PA 718 intersection though the portion south of the PA 18 intersection was part of PA 18 constructed as a bypass of West Middlesex. When the PA 60 freeway was completed up to I-80, the PA 60 designation was applied onto this stretch of road. After I-376 was extended up the PA 60 freeway to I-80 from the Pittsburgh area in November 2009, PA 60 was reduced to its current alignment in Allegheny County while the former PA 60 north of I-80 became PA 760. The PA 760 trailblazers were installed in May 2010.

== Major intersections ==
The entire route is in Mercer County.

Location	mi	km	Exit	Destinations	Notes
Shenango Township	0.000	0.000		I-376 east – New Castle	Continuation east; former PA 60
Shenango Township	0.000	0.000	1	I-80 – Mercer, Youngstown	Signed as exits 1B (east) and 1A (west); exit 4B on I-80; exit nos. correspond to I-376
Shenango Township	0.519– 0.739	0.835– 1.189		PA 18 (New Castle Road) – Sharon, West Middlesex	
Shenango Township	0.739	1.189	Northern end of freeway section		
Hermitage	2.754	4.432		PA 418 north / PA 718 south (Council Street)	Southern end of PA 718 concurrency; southern terminus of PA 418
Sharon	5.345– 5.404	8.602– 8.697		US 62	Roundabout; access via Connelly Boulevard
Sharon	5.419	8.721		US 62 Bus. / PA 718 north (East State Street)	Northern terminus; northern end of PA 718 concurrency
1.000 mi = 1.609 km; 1.000 km = 0.621 mi: Concurrency terminus
