= Pennsylvania Route 418 =

State highway in Mercer County, Pennsylvania, US

Pennsylvania Route 418

Route information
- Maintained by PennDOT
- Length: 2.750 mi (4.426 km)
- Existed: 1928–present

Major junctions
- South end: PA 718 / PA 760 in Wheatland
- North end: US 62 in Hermitage

Location
- Country: United States
- State: Pennsylvania
- Counties: Mercer

Highway system
- Pennsylvania State Route System; Interstate; US; State; Scenic; Legislative
← PA 417	→ PA 419

Pennsylvania Route 418 (PA 418) is a 2.75-mile-long (4.43 km) state highway located in Mercer County, Pennsylvania. The southern terminus is at PA 718/PA 760 in Wheatland. The northern terminus is at US 62 in Hermitage.

== Route description ==
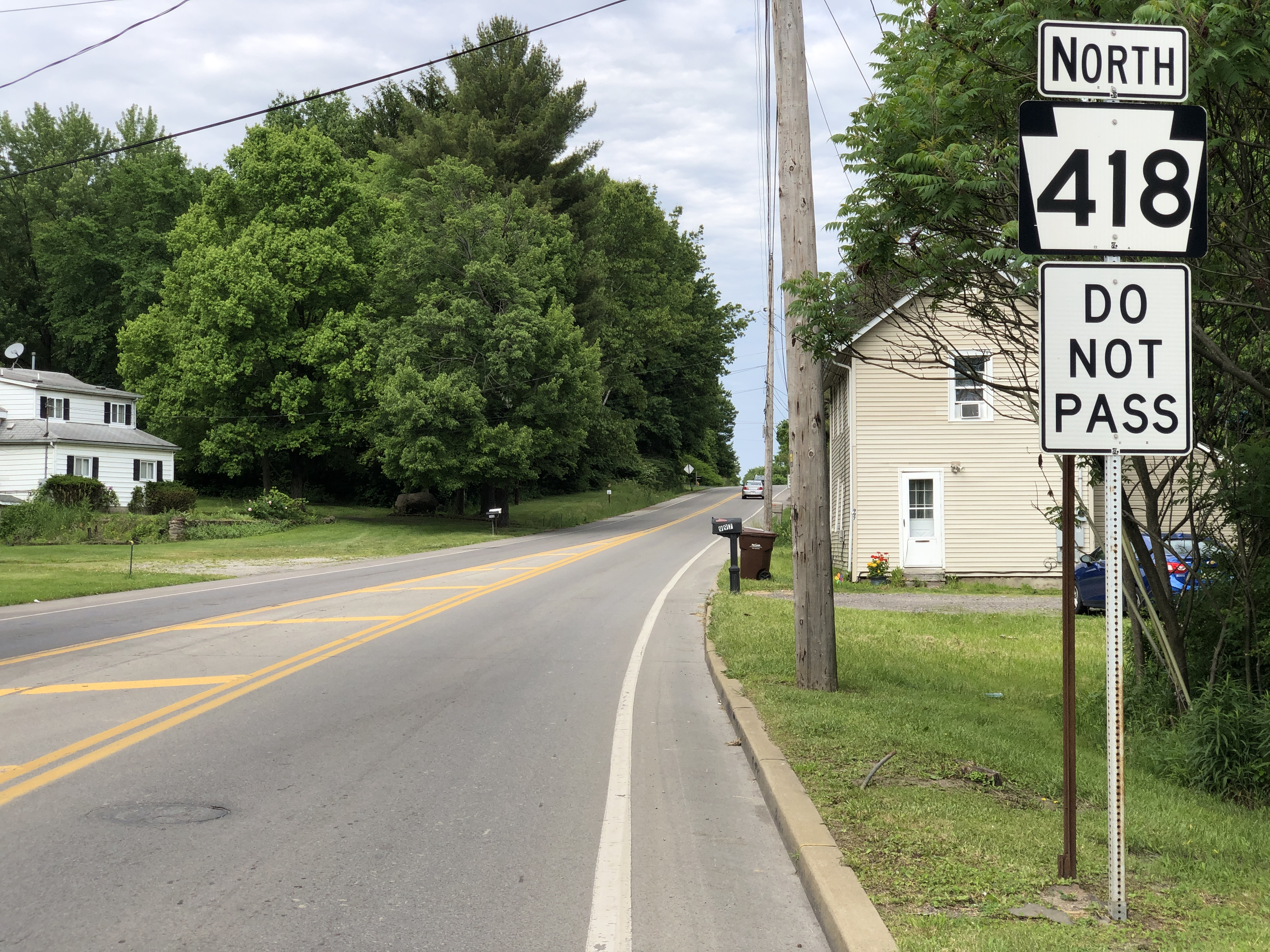
PA 418 northbound in Hermitage

PA 418 begins at an intersection with PA 718 and PA 760 in the borough of Wheatland, heading north on two-lane undivided Council Street. The route passes through residential areas, turning northeast onto Mercer Avenue and heading into the city of Farrell. The road passes more homes and reaches an intersection with PA 518. A short distance after this junction, PA 418 enters the city of Hermitage and heads into more wooded areas with a few residences. The route turns north onto Maple Drive and reaches its northern terminus at US 62.

== Major intersections ==
The entire route is in Mercer County.

Location	mi	km	Destinations	Notes
Wheatland	0.0	0.0	PA 718 / PA 760 (Council Street / Broadway Road) – Farrell, Sharon	Southern terminus
Farrell	1.1	1.8	PA 518 (Sharon New Castle Road)	
Hermitage	2.7	4.3	US 62 (Shenango Valley Freeway)	Northern terminus
1.000 mi = 1.609 km; 1.000 km = 0.621 mi
