= West Middlesex, Pennsylvania =

Borough in Pennsylvania, US

- Borough
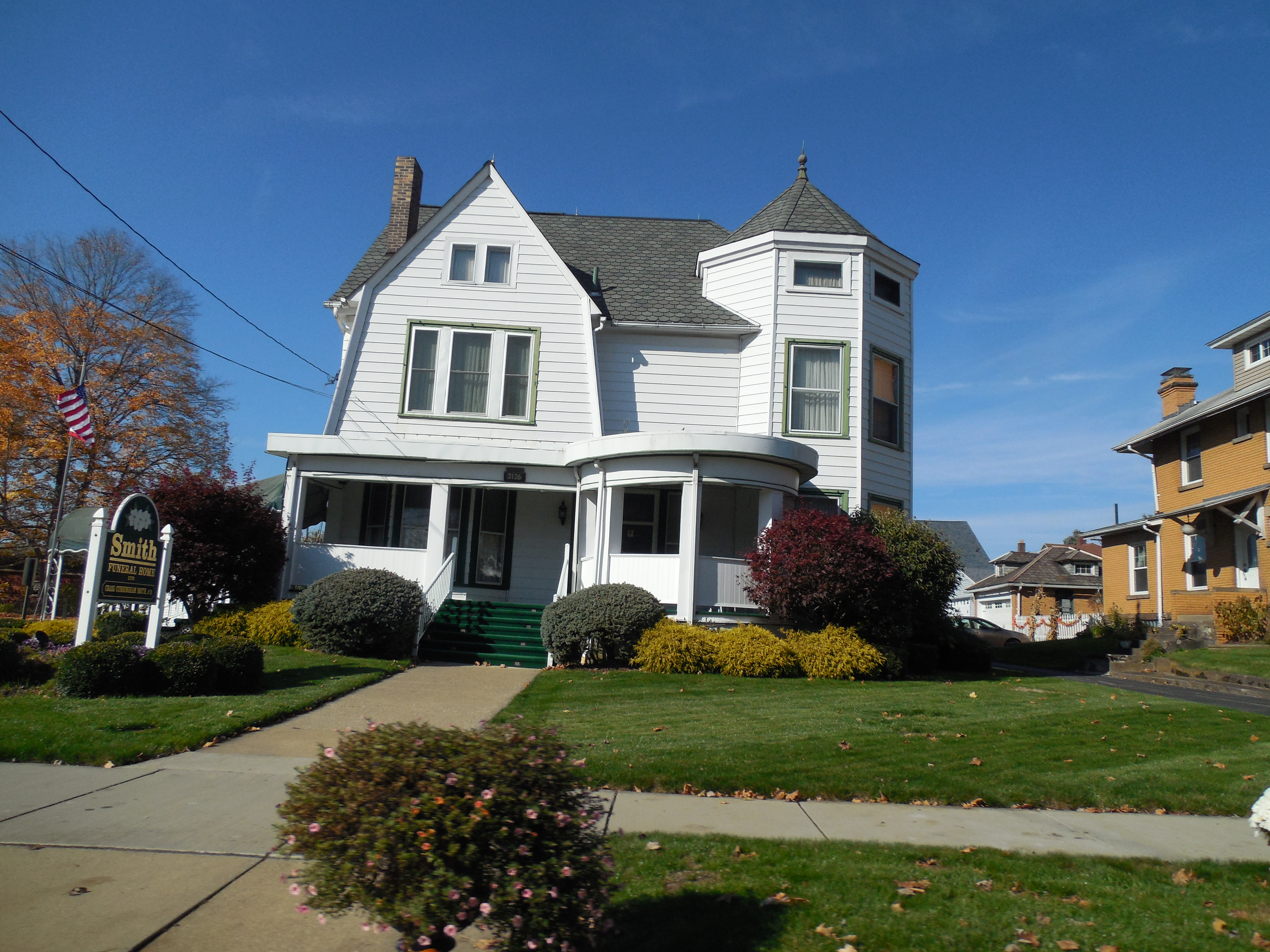
- Main Street funeral home, October 2014

- Location of West Middlesex in Mercer County, Pennsylvania.

- Location of West Middlesex within Pennsylvania
- Coordinates: 41°10′25″N 80°27′25″W
- Country: United States
- State: Pennsylvania
- County: Mercer
- Established: 1836

Government
  - Mayor: Stacey Curry

Area
  - Total: 0.85 sq mi (2.19 km^{2})
  - Land: 0.85 sq mi (2.19 km^{2})
  - Water: 0 sq mi (0.00 km^{2})
- Elevation (center of borough): 860 ft (260 m)
- Highest elevation (eastern border): 980 ft (300 m)
- Lowest elevation (Shenango River): 820 ft (250 m)

Population (2020)
  - Total: 815 ▼
  - Estimate (2021): 809
  - Density: 949.9/sq mi (366.75/km^{2})
- Time zone: UTC-4 (EST)
  - Summer (DST): UTC-5 (EDT)
- Zip code: 16159
- Area code: 724
- FIPS code: 42-83496
- Website: http://www.boroughofwestmiddlesex.com/

West Middlesex is a borough along the Shenango River in southwestern Mercer County, Pennsylvania, United States. The population was 815 at the 2020 Census. It is part of the Hermitage micropolitan area.

== Geography ==
West Middlesex is located at 41°10′25″N 80°27′25″W (41.173630, -80.456874).

According to the United States Census Bureau, the borough has a total area of 0.9 square miles (2.3 km^{2}). The Shenango River runs through West Middlesex, making it part of the Shenango Valley.

== History ==
West Middlesex is one of the oldest localities in Mercer County. Samuel Byers, Andrew Wylie, William Bell, Richard Vanfleet and several others arrived in the vicinity in the late 18th century. In 1787, James Gibson received a plot of land west of the Shenango River for military services. Shortly thereafter, ownership of that land passed to Jacob Edeburn. In 1818, Jacob's son William Edeburn built a log grist mill on part of the land. It was purchased by James McConnell in 1821, who built a log house nearby.

In 1830, Edeburn built a sawmill, and McConnell built a flour mill. James Gilkey, cultivator of the "Neshannock potatoes," surveyed the site and platted the town in 1836 on McConnell's land. A store and a tavern were opened about the time the town was platted, and in 1840 the post office was established, with Robert Young as the first postmaster.

In 1864 West Middlesex was incorporated as a borough. The first burgess was D. Edeburn, and the first members of the council were C.W. Watson, Hiram Veach and G.R. Tuttle.

West Middlesex was one of the first places in the Shenango Valley to become a center of the iron business. The old Middlesex furnace, erected in 1845, was a charcoal-burning plant. Additional coke and ore furnaces followed, including the Fannie (1873, remodeled in 1885) and the Ella (1882).

== Demographics ==
Historical population
Census	Pop.	Note	%±
1870	888		—
1880	918		3.4%
1890	966		5.2%
1900	930		−3.7%
1910	1,157		24.4%
1920	1,349		16.6%
1930	1,181		−12.5%
1940	1,126		−4.7%
1950	1,217		8.1%
1960	1,301		6.9%
1970	1,293		−0.6%
1980	1,064		−17.7%
1990	982		−7.7%
2000	929		−5.4%
2010	863		−7.1%
2020	818		−5.2%
2021 (est.)	809	▼	−1.1%

As of the census of 2010, there were 863 people, 368 households, and 244 families residing in the borough. The racial makeup of the borough was 96.9% White, 1.2% African American, 0.3% Asian, 0.6% from other races, and 1.0% from two or more races. Hispanic or Latino of any race were 0.3% of the population.

There were 391 housing units and 368 households, out of which 26.6% had children under the age of 18 living with them, 46.5% were married couples living together, 14.9% had a female householder with no husband present, and 33.7% were non-families. 30.2% of all households were made up of individuals, and 9.3% had someone living alone who was 65 years of age or older. The average household size was 2.35 people, and the average family size was 2.88 people.

The age distribution was 20.2% under the age of 18, 9.2% from 18 to 24, 24.2% from 25 to 44, 30.9% from 45 to 64, and 15.5% who were 65 years of age or older. The median age was 43.3 years old.

According to the 2015 American Community Survey, the median income for a household in the borough was $46,103, and the median income for a family was $53,750. Among full-time, year-round workers, males had a median income of $45,526 versus $33,675 for females. About 13.6% of families and 16.6% of the population had annual incomes below the poverty line.

=== Political affiliation ===
West Middlesex has supported Republican politicians by comfortable margins in recent years. The town is presently represented by Republican Mike Kelly in the House of Representatives, and voted for GOP incumbent Donald Trump in the 2020 presidential election by a 30 percentage point margin as opposed to Democratic challenger Joe Biden.

== Education ==
The West Middlesex Area School District serves the borough of West Middlesex and its two neighboring townships, Shenango Township and Lackawannock Township. The school district serves students in grades K-12, and it also offers Head Start preschool.

Historically, West Middlesex has served students since shortly after the town was platted. A small frame house was built in 1837 for school sessions and church services, and in 1855, it was replaced by a two-story building: the first story for education, and the second story for worship. A three-story brick union schoolhouse was built in 1868.

== Transportation ==
West Middlesex is the location of the northwestern terminus of Interstate 376, which gives West Middlesex a direct highway connection to Pittsburgh as well as its primary airport. West Middlesex also lies directly on the path of Interstate 80, itself running cross-country between the New York metropolitan area and San Francisco Bay Area, and is accessible to downtown West Middlesex via I-376. The junction of I-80 and I-376 is also the southern terminus of Pennsylvania Route 760, which continues north into Mercer County. West Middlesex's downtown area is centered at the intersection of Pennsylvania State Routes 18 and 318.

No public transportation nor rail lines exist within West Middlesex; the closest bus stops to West Middlesex are in New Wilmington.

West Middlesex is the home of an eponymous airport, though it exclusively serves general aviation and has no regularly scheduled commercial flights. The closest airports with regularly scheduled commercial service are Youngstown–Warren Regional Airport and Pittsburgh International Airport.

== Notable people ==
- Alfred M. Landon, former Governor of Kansas and Republican presidential candidate.
- R. J. Bowers, former professional football player.

== See also ==
- List of towns and boroughs in Pennsylvania
