= Pennsylvania Route 518 =

State highway in Mercer County, Pennsylvania, US

Pennsylvania Route 518

Route information
- Maintained by PennDOT, City of Farrell, City of Sharon
- Length: 8.560 mi (13.776 km)

Major junctions
- South end: PA 18 in Hermitage
- PA 418 in Farrell; US 62 in Sharon; US 62 Bus. in Sharon
- North end: PA 18 in Hermitage

Location
- Country: United States
- State: Pennsylvania
- Counties: Mercer

Highway system
- Pennsylvania State Route System; Interstate; US; State; Scenic; Legislative
← PA 516	→ PA 519

Pennsylvania Route 518 (PA 518) is an 8.5-mile-long (13.7 km) state highway located in Mercer County, Pennsylvania. The southern terminus is at PA 18 in Hermitage. The northern terminus is at PA 18 in Hermitage.

== Route description ==
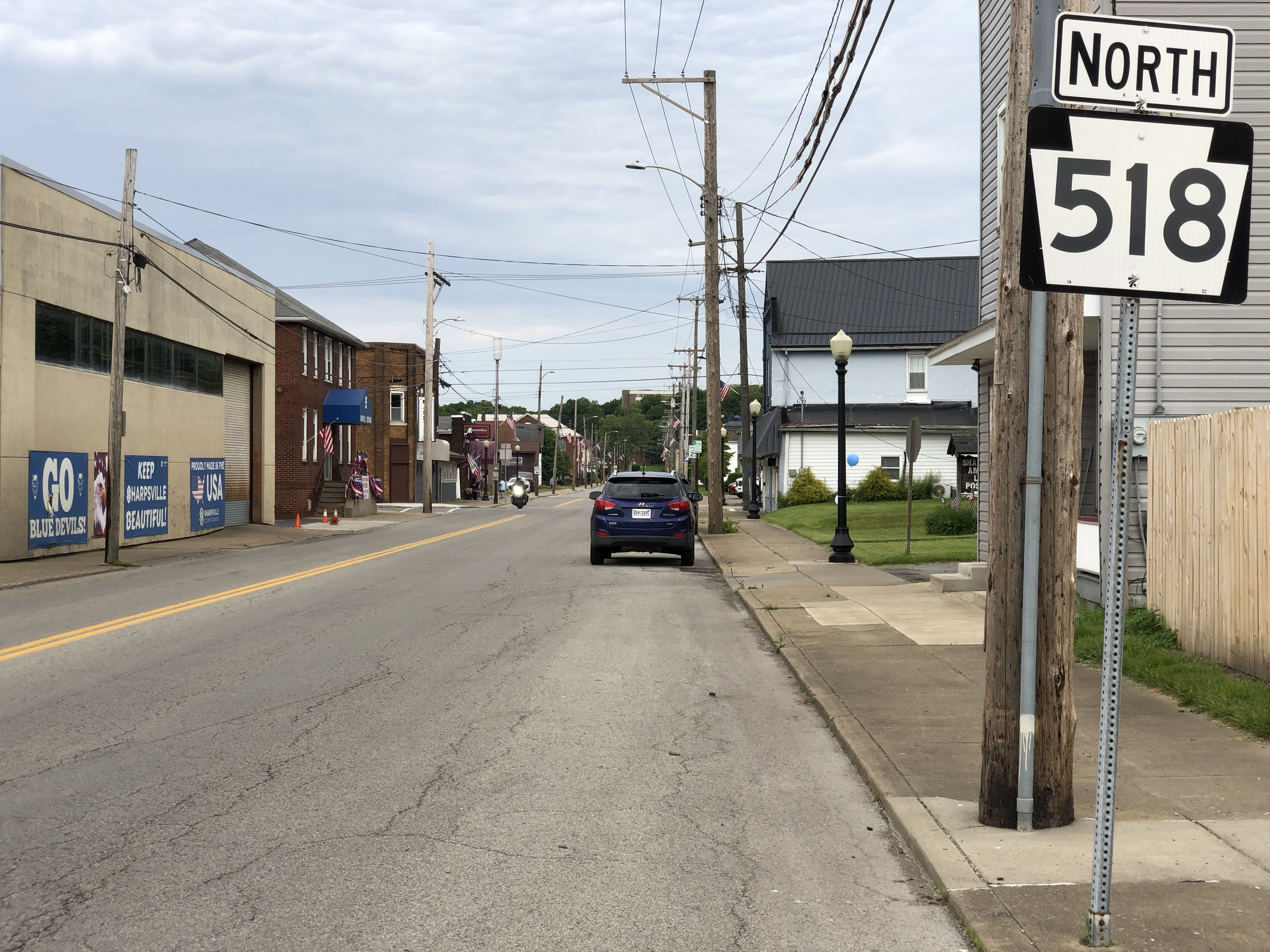
PA 518 northbound in Sharpsville

PA 518 begins at an intersection with PA 18 in the city of Hermitage, heading northwest on two-lane undivided Longview Road. The road passes through wooded areas of homes, heading into the city of Farrell and becoming Sharon New Castle Road. In this area, the route heads through more dense residential development and intersects PA 418. PA 518 heads into commercial areas and becomes the border between the city of Sharon to the north and Farrell to the south, with the name of the road becoming Division Street. The route continues past a mix of homes and businesses, and becomes city-maintained after Indiana Avenue. It fully enters Sharon as it turns north onto Stambaugh Avenue. The road is lined with several residences as it comes to an intersection with U.S. Route 62 (US 62). PA 518 passes a mix of residential and commercial establishments as it reaches US 62 Business (US 62 Bus.). At this point, state maintenance resumes and the route turns west to form a concurrency with US 62 Business on East State Street. The road continues west past several businesses along with some homes.

PA 518 splits from US 62 Business in the center of Sharon by heading north on North Sharpsville Avenue. The road passes industrial areas to the west and a mix of residences and businesses to the east. The route makes a curve to the east into residential areas, becoming Thornton Street, prior to turning north onto Hall Avenue. The road passes more homes and runs through a small portion of Hermitage prior to entering the borough of Sharpsville. Here, PA 518 bends to the north-northeast along West Ridge Avenue, eventually curving to the east-northeast. Continuing through residential areas, the route makes a turn north onto South 7th Street before turning east onto West Main Street a block later. Along this road, PA 518 passes a mix of homes and businesses prior to making a turn south onto South Walnut Street. At this point, the road passes more residences, curving to the east. PA 518 crosses back into Hermitage and becomes Lamor Road as it passes through wooded areas of homes, reaching its terminus at another intersection with PA 18.

== Major intersections ==
The entire route is in Mercer County.

Location	mi	km	Destinations	Notes
Hermitage	0.000	0.000	PA 18 (South Hermitage Road) / Longview Road – West Middlesex	Southern terminus
Farrell	1.507	2.425	PA 418 (Mercer Avenue)	
Sharon	3.130	5.037	US 62 (East Connelly Boulevard)	
Sharon	3.280	5.279	US 62 Bus. east (East State Street) / Stambaugh Avenue	South end of US 62 Bus. overlap
Sharon	3.876	6.238	US 62 Bus. west (East State Street) to South Sharpsville Avenue / I-80	North end of US 62 Bus. overlap
Hermitage	8.560	13.776	PA 18 (North Hermitage Road) / Lamor Road (SR 3020) – Greenville, West Middlesex	Northern terminus
1.000 mi = 1.609 km; 1.000 km = 0.621 mi: Concurrency terminus
