= Pennsylvania Route 846 =

State highway in Mercer County, Pennsylvania, US

Pennsylvania Route 846

Route information
- Maintained by PennDOT
- Length: 12.41 mi (19.97 km)

Major junctions
- South end: PA 718 in Hermitage
- North end: PA 18 in Greenville

Location
- Country: United States
- State: Pennsylvania
- Counties: Mercer

Highway system
- Pennsylvania State Route System; Interstate; US; State; Scenic; Legislative
← PA 845	→ PA 847

Pennsylvania Route 846 (PA 846) is a 12.41-mile-long (19.97 km) state highway located in Mercer County, Pennsylvania. The southern terminus is at PA 718 in Hermitage. The northern terminus is at PA 18 in Greenville.

== Route description ==
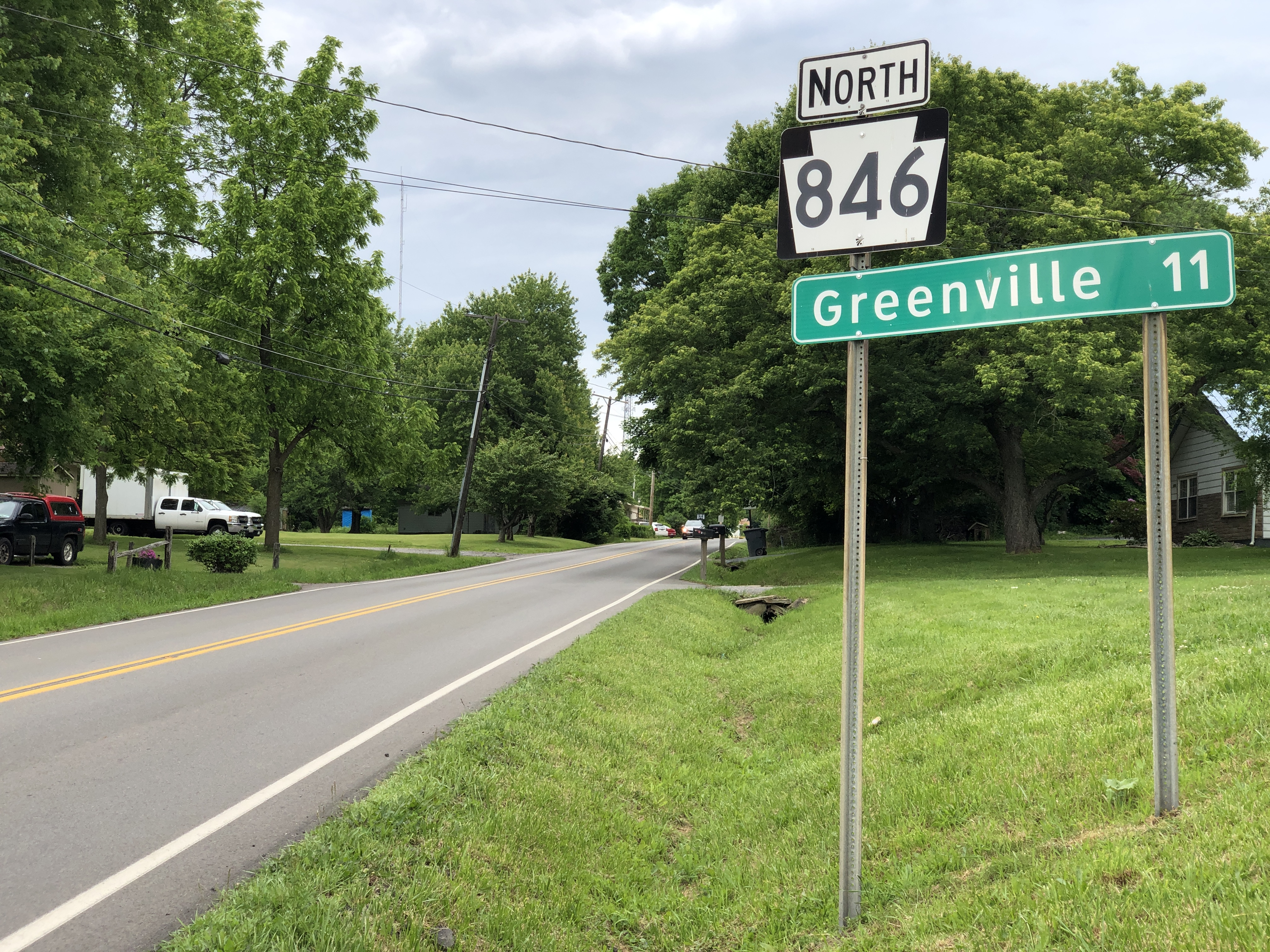
PA 846 northbound in South Pymatuning Township

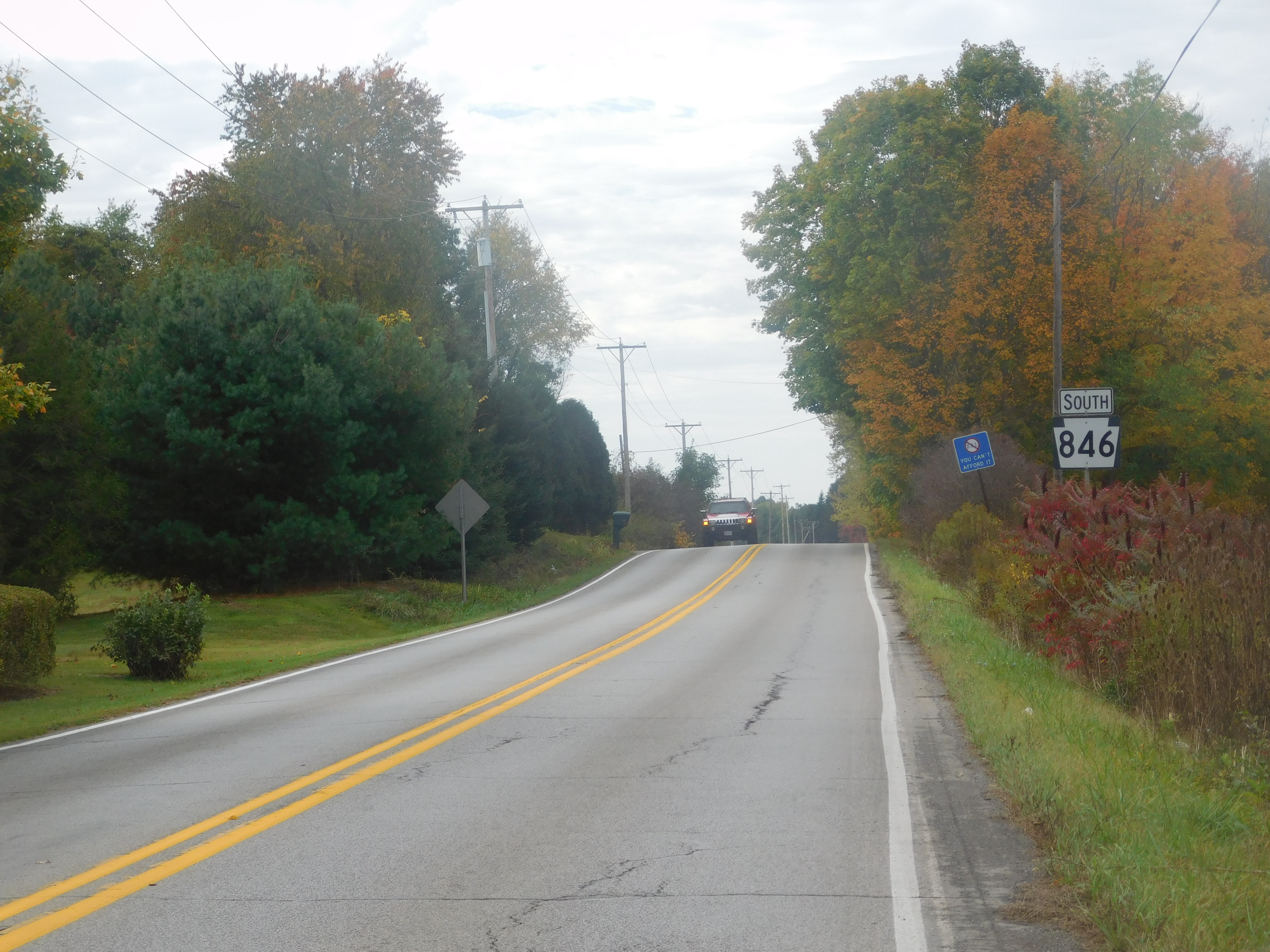
PA 846 in South Pymatuning Township

PA 846 begins at an intersection with PA 718 in the city of Hermitage, heading northeast on two-lane undivided River Road. The road runs through a mix of fields and woods with some homes, crossing into South Pymatuning Township. In this area, the route becomes Saranac Drive and continues through rural areas of residential and commercial development. PA 846 turns north and runs between farmland to the west and forested areas of the Shenango Lake Recreation Area. The road curves northeast again and heads into forests of the recreation area, crossing Shenango River Lake. After leaving the recreation area, the route enters a mix of farm fields and woods with some development, continuing into Pymatuning Township. The road heads north again through agricultural areas with a few woods and residences. PA 846 enters West Salem Township and becomes Orangeville Road, making a bend to the northeast. The route continues through rural areas of farms and woods with a few residences for several miles. Upon entering the borough of Greenville, PA 846 becomes Orangeville Street and passes homes, reaching its northern terminus at PA 18.

== Major intersections ==
The entire route is in Mercer County.

Location	mi	km	Destinations	Notes
Hermitage	0.00	0.00	PA 718 (North Water Avenue) – Sharon	Southern terminus
Greenville	12.41	19.97	PA 18 (Clarksville Street)	Northern terminus
1.000 mi = 1.609 km; 1.000 km = 0.621 mi
