= West Middlesex Area School District =

School district in Pennsylvania

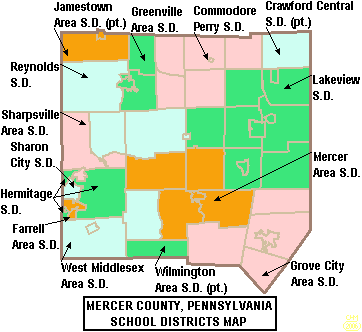

Address
- 3591 Sharon Road West Middlesex, Pennsylvania, 16159-3721; United States

District information
- Type: Public

Other information
- Website: westmiddlesex.org

The West Middlesex Area School District is a small, rural public school district serving the southwestern portion of Mercer County, Pennsylvania. It encompasses the communities of West Middlesex, Shenango Township, and Lackawannock Township. The West Middlesex Area School District encompasses approximately 52 square miles (130 km^{2}). The district operates on a single 40-acre campus. According to 2000 federal census data, it served a resident population of 7,527. By 2010, the district's population declined to 7,454 people. In 2009, the district residents’ per capita income was $16,870, while the median family income was $40,558. In the Commonwealth, the median family income was $49,501 and the United States median family income was $49,445, in 2010.

West Middlesex Area School District operates three schools: Luther W Low Elementary School, Oakview Elementary School and West Middlesex Area Junior Senior High School. The district is one of the 500 public school districts of Pennsylvania and one of 16 full or partial public school districts operating in Mercer County.

== Extracurriculars ==
West Middlesex Area School District offers a wide variety of clubs, activities and an extensive sports program.

=== Sports ===
The district funds:

Boys

- Baseball - AA
- Basketball- AA
- Cross Country - A
- Football - A
- Golf - AA
- Indoor Track and Field - AAAA
- Soccer - A
- Track and Field - AA
- Wrestling - AA

Girls

- Basketball - AA
- Cross Country - A
- Golf - AA
- Indoor Track and Field - AAAA
- Soccer (Fall) - A
- Softball - A
- Girls' Tennis - AA
- Track and Field - AA
- Volleyball - A

Junior High School Sports

Boys

- Baseball
- Basketball
- Cross Country
- Football
- Soccer
- Track and Field
- Wrestling

Girls

- Basketball
- Cross Country
- Soccer (Fall)
- Track and Field
- Volleyball

According to PIAA directory July 2013
