= Judson Flint =

American football player (born 1957)

No. 20, 28
- Position: Defensive back

Personal information
- Born: January 26, 1957; Farrell, Pennsylvania, U.S.
- Died: November 6, 2018 (aged 61)
- Listed height: 6 ft 0 in (1.83 m)
- Listed weight: 201 lb (91 kg)

Career information
- High school: Farrell
- College: Memphis
- NFL draft: 1979: 7th round, 177th overall pick

Career history
- New England Patriots (1979); Cleveland Browns (1980–1982); Buffalo Bills (1983)

Career NFL statistics
- Interceptions: 3
- Fumble recoveries: 1
- Sacks: 1
- Stats at Pro Football Reference

Judson Rochelle Flint (January 26, 1957 – November 6, 2018) was an American professional football defensive back who played four seasons in the National Football League (NFL) with the Cleveland Browns and Buffalo Bills. He was selected by the New England Patriots in the seventh round of the 1979 NFL draft. He played college football at California University of Pennsylvania and Memphis State University.

== Early life ==
Flint attended Farrell High School in Farrell, Pennsylvania.

== Professional career ==
Flint was selected in the seventh round by the New England Patriots with the 177th pick in the 1979 NFL Draft. He missed the 1979 season due to a knee injury. He was released by the Patriots on September 1, 1980.

Flint signed with the Cleveland Browns on September 27, 1980. He played in 38 games for the team from 1980 to 1982. In July 1983, he was named out of action indefinitely with a broken right ankle. He was later released by the Browns.

Flint was signed by the Buffalo Bills on December 13, 1983, and played in one game for the Bills during the 1983 season. He was released by the Bills on July 30, 1984.
