= Crooked Creek Bridge =

- U.S. National Register of Historic Places
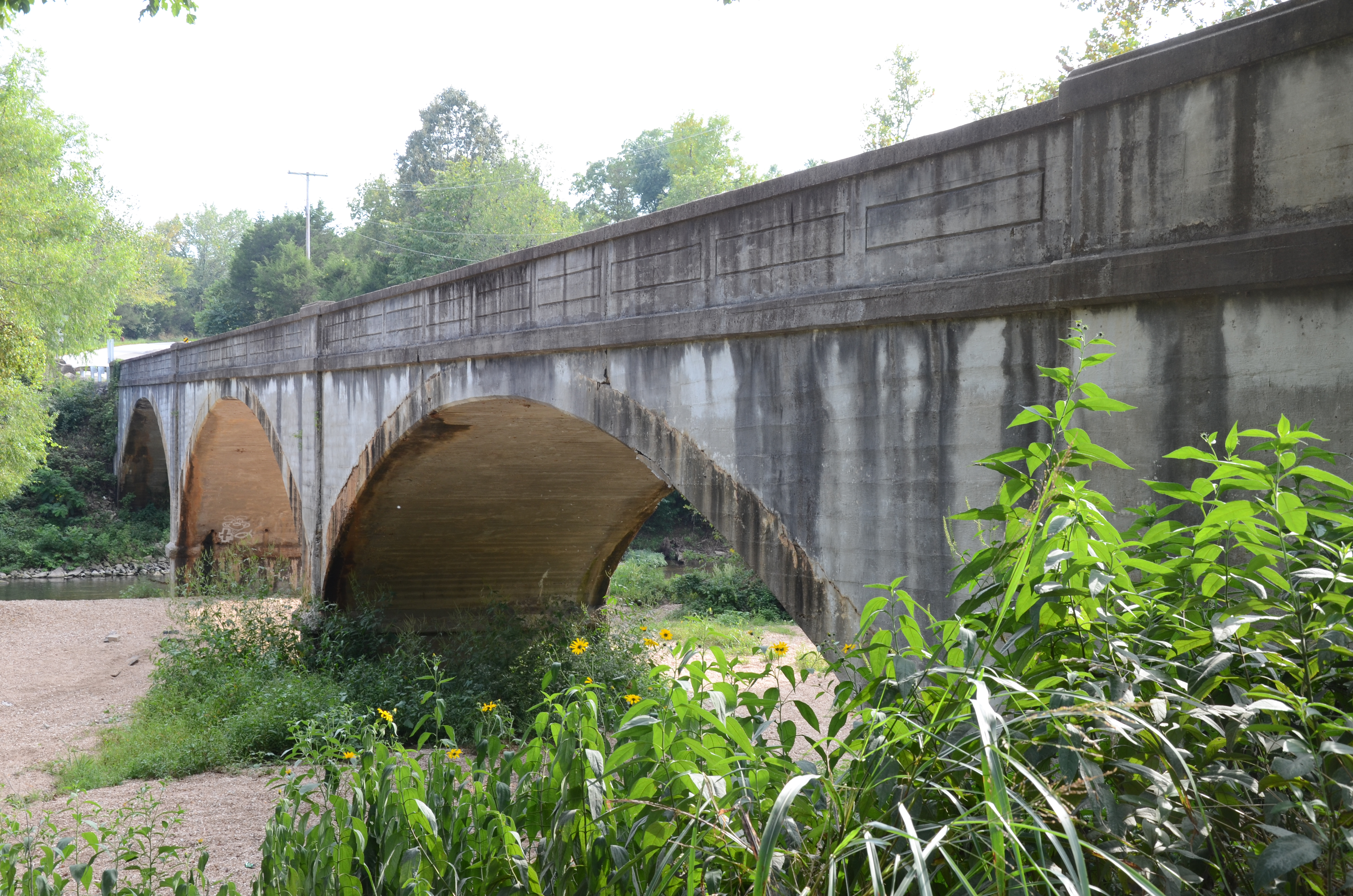

- Location within Arkansas Location within the United States
- Location: US 62S over Crooked Creek, Pyatt, Arkansas
- Coordinates: 36°14′54″N 92°50′38″W
- Area: less than one acre
- Built: 1923
- Built by: M.C. Orr Contracting Co.
- Architectural style: Concrete arch
- MPS: Historic Bridges of Arkansas MPS
- NRHP reference No.: 09001253
- Added to NRHP: January 21, 2010

The Crooked Creek Bridge is a concrete arch bridge that carries U.S. Route 62 Spur over Crooked Creek in Pyatt, Arkansas. Built in 1923, the bridge was listed on the National Register of Historic Places on January 21, 2010.

== History ==
Although a town site had existed at this bend of Crooked Creek since the 1870s, Pyatt became a town in 1904 upon completion of the St. Louis, Iron Mountain and Southern Railway tracks through the area. As the cotton industry grew in the area and roads began to spring up around Marion County, a connecting road became necessary to give Pyatt access to the main route in the county. Completion of the Crooked Creek Bridge gave Pyatt access to the modern U.S. Route 62 via a spur route.

== Design ==
The closed spandrel arch design became popular during the City Beautiful movement in the 1900s. Concrete became a popular bridge material at the time as well, in an effort to imitate many Roman bridges thought to be beautiful.

== See also ==
- National Register of Historic Places listings in Marion County, Arkansas
- List of bridges on the National Register of Historic Places in Arkansas
