= R. J. Bowers =

American football player (born 1974)

R.J. Bowers
No. 33, 34
- Positions: Halfback, fullback

Personal information
- Born: February 10, 1974; Honolulu, Hawaii, U.S.
- Listed height: 6 ft 0 in (1.83 m)
- Listed weight: 250 lb (113 kg)

Career information
- High school: West Middlesex (PA)
- College: Grove City College
- NFL draft: 2001: undrafted

Career history
- Carolina Panthers (2001)*; Pittsburgh Steelers (2001); Cleveland Browns (2002–2003)
- * Offseason or practice squad member only

Career NFL statistics
- Rushing Att. / Yds.: 18 / 84
- Receptions / Yds.: 2 / 2
- Touchdowns: 2
- Stats at Pro Football Reference

Raymond Keith "R.J." Bowers (born February 10, 1974) is an American former professional football player and Minor League Baseball athlete. He was born in Honolulu, Hawaii. He was selected by the Houston Astros in 1992 and played six years in their minor league system before retiring from baseball in 1997. Bowers then attended Grove City College, where he became one of the most prolific running backs in NCAA history, setting records for career rushing yards (7,353) and points scored (562). He held the NCAA career rushing record from 2000 to 2007, when it was surpassed by Danny Woodhead. He earned multiple All-America honors, won the Melberger Award, and helped Grove City secure two conference championships.

Bowers played in the NFL as a halfback and fullback for the Pittsburgh Steelers in 2001 and the Cleveland Browns from 2002 to 2003, recording 84 rushing yards and two touchdowns. After his college football career, Grove City College retired his number 33 jersey, and he was inducted into their Athletic Hall of Fame in 2012.
