= Farrell, Pennsylvania =

City in Pennsylvania, US

- City
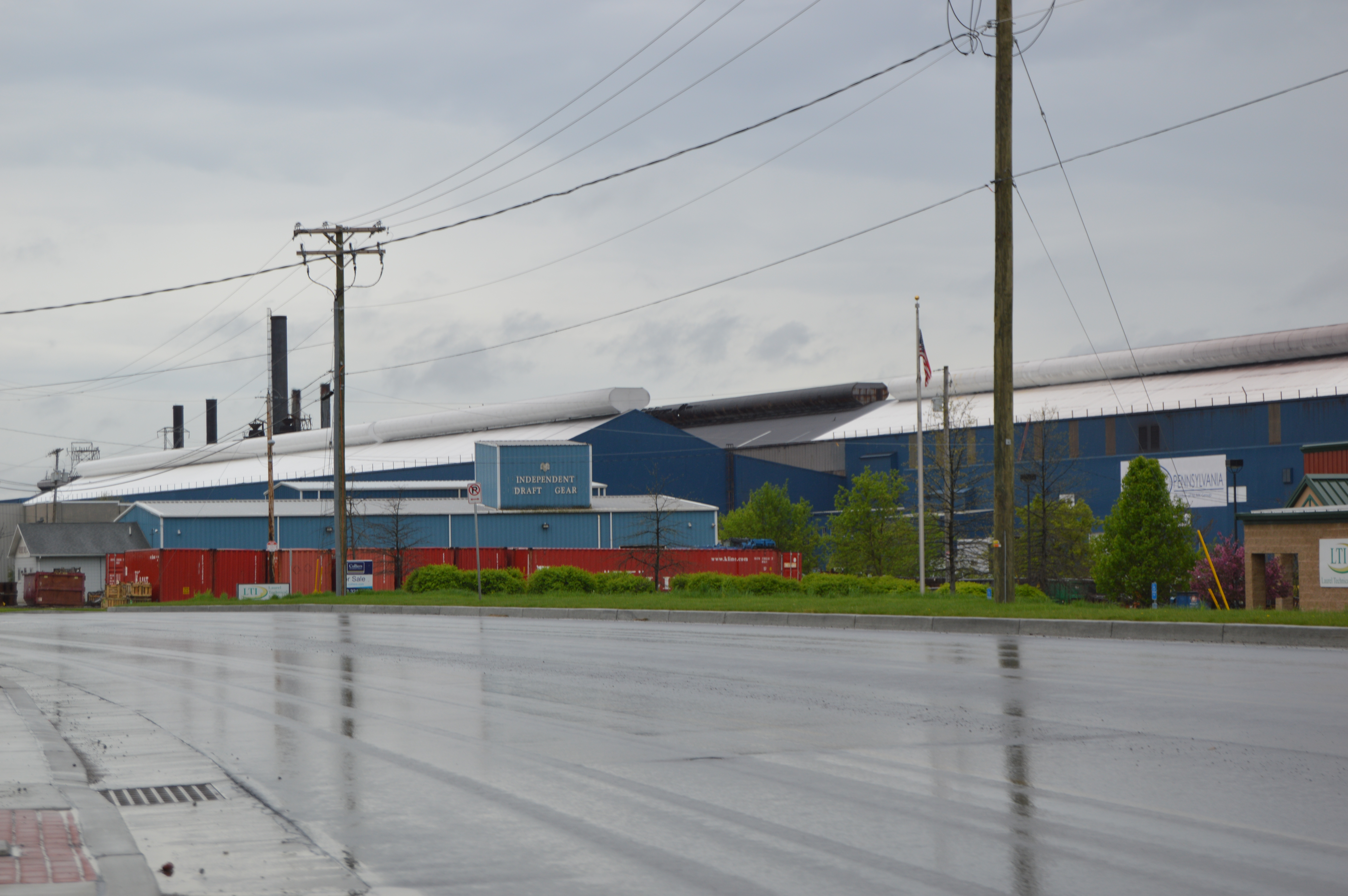
- Mill on Pennsylvania Routes 718/760

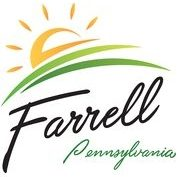
- Seal Logo

- Location of Farrell in Mercer County, Pennsylvania.

- Location within Pennsylvania
- Coordinates: 41°12′42″N 80°29′39″W
- Country: United States
- State: Pennsylvania
- County: Mercer
- Established: 1899
- Incorporated (borough): 1916
- Incorporated (city): 1932
- Named for: James A. Farrell

Government
  - Mayor: Kimberly Doss

Area
  - Total: 2.27 sq mi (5.89 km^{2})
  - Land: 2.26 sq mi (5.86 km^{2})
  - Water: 0.0077 sq mi (0.02 km^{2})

Population (2020)
  - Total: 4,258
  - Density: 1,880.6/sq mi (726.12/km^{2})
- Time zone: UTC-4 (EST)
  - Summer (DST): UTC-5 (EDT)
- Zip Code: 16121
- Area code: 724
- FIPS code: 42-25360
- Website: cityoffarrell.com

Farrell is a city in western Mercer County, Pennsylvania, United States, along the Shenango River. As of the 2020 census, it had a population of 4,258. The city is part of the Hermitage micropolitan area.

== History ==
Once dubbed "The Magic City," Farrell sprang up practically overnight when a steel mill was constructed in 1901 on a plain bordering the Shenango River, near Sharon, in what was then part of Hickory Township (now Hermitage).

The community name was at the beginning South Sharon. In 1912, the population reached 10,000. At that time, the residents of the new city elected to take the name of Farrell, after industrialist James A. Farrell.

The community was incorporated as the Borough of South Sharon in 1916; its population peaked at over 15,000 in 1920 and its status was elevated to a third-class city in 1932. In 1939, artist Virginia Wood Riggs was commissioned to paint the mural Myths of Vulcan and Juno in the towns post office. The mural was painted over in 1966.

The mill, which eventually became known as the Roemer Works of Sharon Steel Corporation, would serve as the community's lifeblood until 1992, when it was liquidated after filing bankruptcy. Many of the assets were sold at auction to Britain-based Caparo Corporation and later to Swiss steelmaker Duferco, which operates the plant today. Farrell was designated a financially distressed municipality in 1987 by the state of Pennsylvania.

In 2004 local politicians proposed the creation of Shenango Valley City, consisting of Farrell as well as Hermitage, Sharpsville, Sharon, and Wheatland with the issue being put on the ballot in the form of a referendum. Then Governor of Pennsylvania, Ed Rendell voiced support for the measure and would be joined by Kathleen McGinty, Secretary of the Department of Environmental Protection, and Dennis Yablonsky, Secretary of the Department of Community and Economic Development with the trio touring the region to urge for voters to pass the motion. The city would largely be an expansion of Hermitage, whose city government would be retained including the office of mayor and it's nine-member city council. The merger would have kept the various independent school districts intact. The effort would ultimately be defeated, and via the ordinance the issue of merger could not be brought up again until 2009.

Despite years of population and industrial decline, Farrell has made progress in rebuilding itself due to new industrial investments on tax abated land and several new housing starts.

== Demographics ==
Historical population
Census	Pop.	Note	%±
1910	10,190		—
1920	15,586		53.0%
1930	14,359		−7.9%
1940	13,899		−3.2%
1950	13,644		−1.8%
1960	13,793		1.1%
1970	11,000		−20.2%
1980	8,645		−21.4%
1990	6,841		−20.9%
2000	6,050		−11.6%
2010	5,111		−15.5%
2020	4,258		−16.7%

=== 2020 census ===
As of the 2020 census, Farrell had a population of 4,258, and the median age was 45.1 years. 21.4% of residents were under the age of 18 and 22.1% were 65 years of age or older. For every 100 females there were 85.9 males, and for every 100 females age 18 and over there were 81.3 males age 18 and over.

100.0% of residents lived in urban areas, while 0.0% lived in rural areas.

There were 1,960 households in Farrell, of which 24.0% had children under the age of 18 living in them. Of all households, 24.4% were married-couple households, 22.5% were households with a male householder and no spouse or partner present, and 45.6% were households with a female householder and no spouse or partner present. About 39.4% of all households were made up of individuals and 18.3% had someone living alone who was 65 years of age or older.

There were 2,225 housing units, of which 11.9% were vacant. The homeowner vacancy rate was 2.1% and the rental vacancy rate was 6.4%.

Racial composition as of the 2020 census
Race	Number	Percent
White	1,864	43.8%
Black or African American	2,005	47.1%
American Indian and Alaska Native	4	0.1%
Asian	18	0.4%
Native Hawaiian and Other Pacific Islander	0	0.0%
Some other race	53	1.2%
Two or more races	314	7.4%
Hispanic or Latino (of any race)	82	1.9%

=== 2000 census ===
As of the 2000 census there were 6,050 people, 2,504 households, and 1,620 families residing in the city. The population density was 2,589.1 inhabitants per square mile (999.7/km^{2}). There were 2,752 housing units at an average density of 1,177.7 per square mile (454.7/km^{2}). The racial composition of the city was 50.28% White, 46.71% African American, 0.12% Native American, 0.20% Asian, 0.02% Pacific Islander, 0.30% from other races, and 2.38% from two or more races. Hispanic or Latino of any race were 0.66% of the population.

There were 2,504 households, out of which 27.0% had children under the age of 18 living with them, 36.0% were married couples living together, 24.4% had a female householder with no husband present, and 35.3% were non-families. 31.5% of all households were made up of individuals, and 17.9% had someone living alone who was 65 years of age or older. The average household size was 2.37 and the average family size was 2.96.

In the city, the population was spread out, with 25.6% under the age of 18, 7.4% from 18 to 24, 23.6% from 25 to 44, 20.8% from 45 to 64, and 22.6% who were 65 years of age or older. The median age was 40 years. For every 100 females, there were 80.2 males. For every 100 females age 18 and over, there were 74.2 males.

The median income for a household in the city was $22,659, and the median income for a family was $28,935. Males had a median income of $32,800 versus $20,729 for females. The per capita income for the city was $14,532. About 24.0% of families and 26.4% of the population were below the poverty line, including 47.5% of those under age 18 and 9.6% of those age 65 or over.

== Economy ==
The city government provides numerous incentives to entice new businesses to locate within its borders. Today, some of the major contributors to Farrell's business base include:

- Duferco Farrell Corp. (steel processing)
- First General Services of Western PA. (Property Restoration)
- Kalco Metals Inc. (specialty alloys)
- NLMK Pennsylvania, a subsidiary of Novolipetsk Steel
- Precision Steel Services (roll forming)
- Premier Hydraulics Inc. (hydraulic parts manufacturing)
- Sharon Custom Metal Forming (roll forming and welding)
- Sharon Packing Co. (food processing)
- UPMC Horizon Hospital, Farrell Campus

Farrell emerged Feb. 8, 2019 from Act 47 provisions. The Act provides for municipalities that are near bankruptcy. Farrell had been under Act 47 since 1987, as Pennsylvania's first municipality to enter financially distressed municipality status.

== Media ==
=== Television ===
Because of Farrell's location near the Pennsylvania/Ohio border, it is served by WKBN-TV (CBS), WFMJ-TV (NBC), WYTV (ABC), WYFX-LD (Fox) and WBCB (CW), all broadcast from nearby Youngstown, OH.

=== Radio ===
Farrell is served by AM radio stations such as WLOA (1470 AM) (Farrell, PA), WPIC (790 AM) (Sharon, PA), WKBN (570 AM) (Youngstown, OH) and FM radio stations such as WYFM/"Y-103" (102.9 FM) (Sharon, PA), WLLF/"Sports Radio 96.7" (96.7 FM) (Mercer, PA), WYLE/"Willie 95.1" (95.1 FM) (Grove City, PA), WMXY/"Mix 98.9" (98.9 FM) (Youngstown, OH).

== Notable people ==
- Jack Marin - born October 12, 1944, is an American former professional basketball player. A 201 cm (6-foot, 7-inch) guard/forward from Duke University, Marin was valedictorian of his high school class at Farrell High School.
- Russell L. Caldwell, historian and college professor
- Gravelle Craig, head men's basketball coach, Bethune-Cookman University
- Randy Crowder, former NFL football player with the Miami Dolphins and Tampa Bay Buccaneers
- Judson Flint, NFL player
- E. L. Konigsburg, Newbery Award winning author
- Marc L. Marks, politician and lawyer
- Duke Mitchell, actor and comedian
- Neal Russo, columnist for the St. Louis Post-Dispatch and The Sporting News
- Willie Somerset, ABA All-Star professional basketball player
- Billy Soose, Middleweight Boxing Champion
- Lorenzo Styles, former NFL football player with the Atlanta Falcons and St. Louis Rams
- Leo Yankevich, new formalist poet and editor
