= Wheatland, Pennsylvania =

Former borough in Pennsylvania, US

- Former Borough
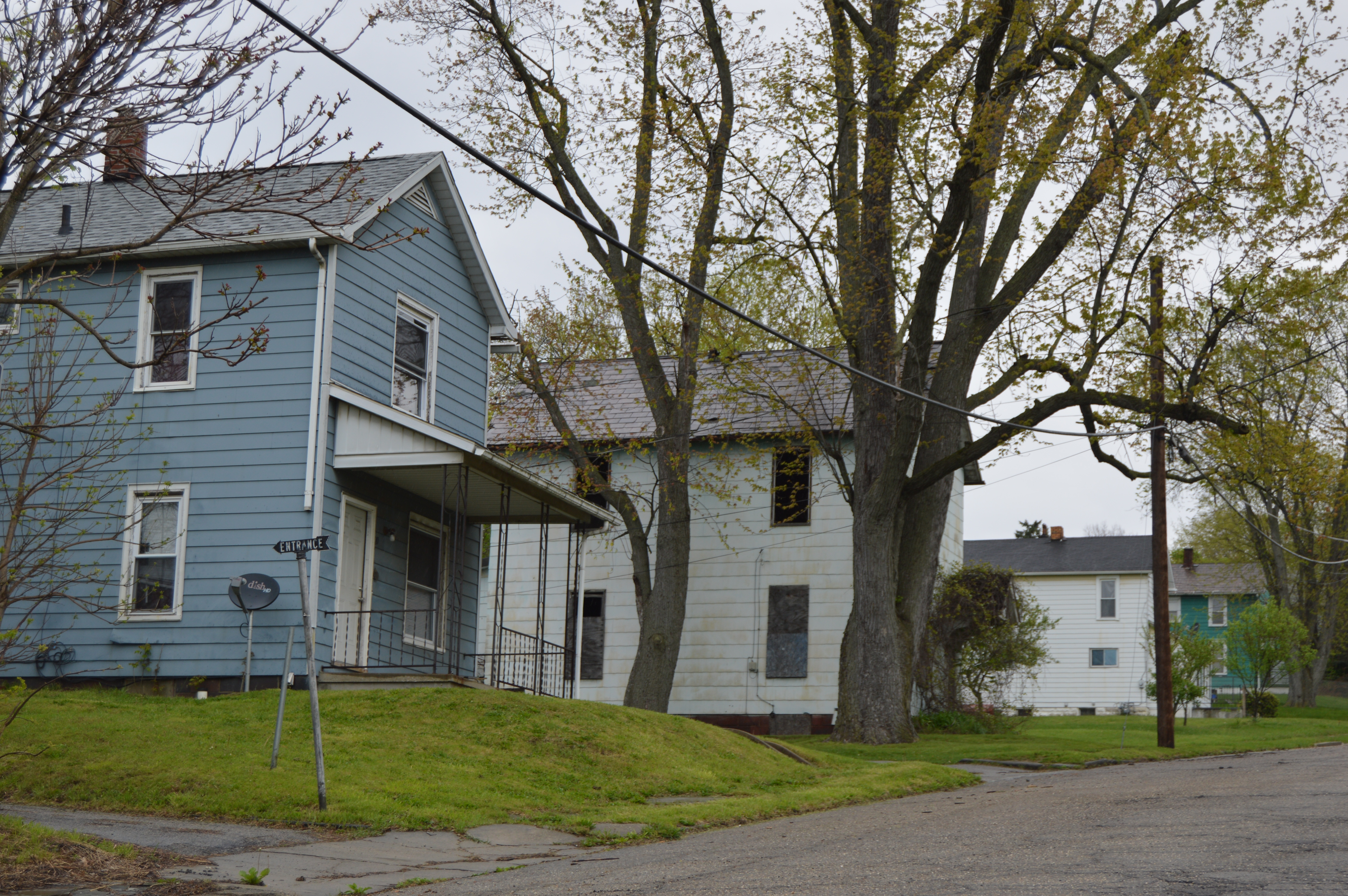
- Houses on Emerson Avenue

- Flag Seal
- Etymology: Land of Wheat
- Location of Wheatland in Mercer County, Pennsylvania.

- Location of Wheatland within Pennsylvania
- Coordinates: 41°12′1″N 80°29′45″W
- Country: United States
- State: Pennsylvania
- County: Mercer
- Established: 1865
- Incorporated: February 12, 1872
- Annexed by Hermitage: January 1, 2024

Government
  - Mayor (final): Ronald Viglio (D)

Area
  - Total: 0.87 sq mi (2.26 km^{2})
  - Land: 0.87 sq mi (2.26 km^{2})
  - Water: 0 sq mi (0.00 km^{2})
- Elevation (center of borough): 914 ft (279 m)
- Highest elevation (northern borough border): 1,100 ft (340 m)
- Lowest elevation (Shenango River): 830 ft (250 m)

Population (2020)
  - Total: 583 ▼
  - Estimate (2021): 578
  - Density: 666.7/sq mi (257.41/km^{2})
- Time zone: UTC-4 (EST)
  - Summer (DST): UTC-5 (EDT)
- Zip code: 16161
- Area code: 724
- FIPS code: 42-84376

Wheatland is a former borough within the city of Hermitage in Mercer County, Pennsylvania, United States, along the Shenango River. The population was 583 at the 2020 census. The borough merged with Hermitage in 2024 after residents of both communities voted to approve the merger in November 2022.

== History ==
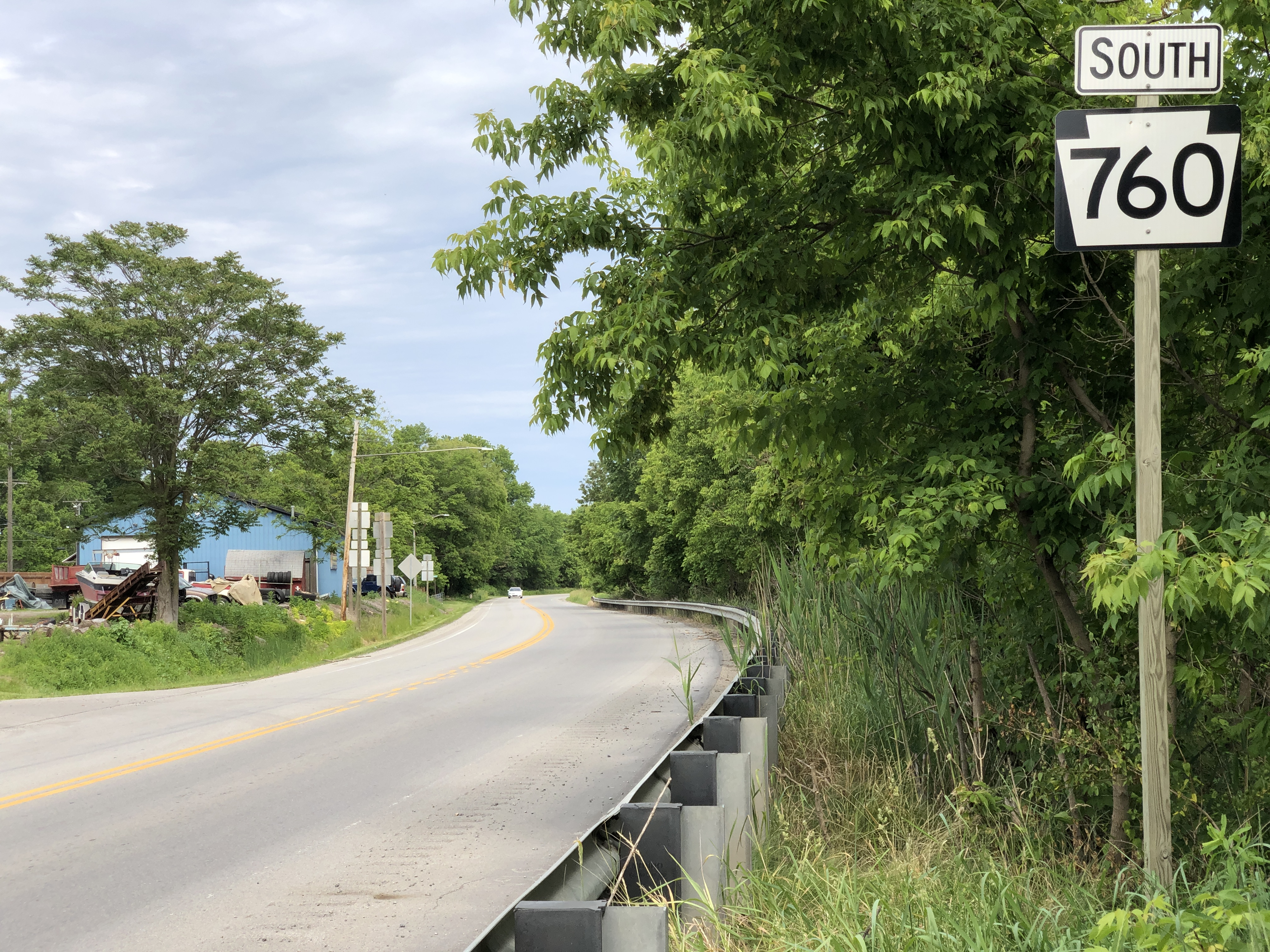
Pennsylvania Route 760 passing through Wheatland

Prior to the construction of the first iron furnace in the area, the land that would become Wheatland was primarily rural, and split between two family farms, the Shilling family, who arrived first, founded by pioneer George Shilling, and the Canon family, who arrived later in 1797 and where founded by Squire Canon, and joined by a Presbyterian Reverend James Satterfield. Additionally, Dr. John Mitcheltree, the pioneer physician of the entire Shenango Valley during its early settling, also resided in what would become Wheatland.

Wheatland would be platted in 1865 and would be incorporated on February 12, 1872. Wheatland was designed as a company town for the Wheatland Iron Co. and the Wheatland Bessemer Steel Co. and would remain a manufacturing hub throughout much of its early history, diversifying with the opening of a Sawhill Manufacturing Co. lumbermill in 1940.

On November 10, 1908, South Sharon Borough attempted to annex a portion of Wheatland, from Kedron street in the south to Bond street in the north, and from Beechwood avenue in the east to Hamilton avenue in the west. However, the Court of Common Pleas of Mercer County overruled the attempt on May 7, 1912. On December 18, 1918, Wheatland borough annexed a 30.85 acre portion of Hickory Township via borough ordinance that was approved by the Court of Quarter Sessions of the Peace of Mercer County in January 1919. On June 7, 1952, Wheatland borough annexed another parcel from Hickory Township approved by the Court in September 1952, bringing the borough to its final borders prior to absorption.

=== 1985 tornado ===
Wheatland suffered catastrophic damage on May 31, 1985, when an F5 tornado struck the area. In Wheatland, over 100 buildings were leveled and six people were killed.

=== 21st century and annexation ===
From 2002 to 2007 Wheatland attempted to form an independent school district, instead of being serviced by the Farrell Area School District. This effort would see serious backlash from local residents, many of whom had moved to Wheatland for the sole purpose of being serviced by the Farrell School District, and a lawsuit ensued to instead have Wheatland be serviced by the West Middlesex Area School District. The suit eventually reached the Commonwealth Court of Pennsylvania where Judges Renée Cohn Jubelirer, Doris Smith-Ribner, and James Gardner Colins struck down the secession, keeping Wheaton in the Farrell district, on account that the petition to do so, which reported 50.4% of taxpayers in favor, misrepresented what a "taxpayer" entailed in 2006.

From 1990 to 2009 Wheatland's mayor was Thomas R. Stanton who led efforts to preserve the borough's independence, personally negotiating for state resources to help residents and improve infrastructure with his governance dominating the politics of the borough in its final decades. During his departure Stanton campaigned in the borough council for support of his incoming replacement, Brian P. Estock, and ran for a single term on the borough council to help ease his transition.

In 2004 local politicians proposed the creation of Shenango Valley City, consisting of Wheatland, as well as Hermitage, Sharon, Farrell, and Sharpsville with the issue being put on the ballot in the form of a referendum. Then Governor of Pennsylvania, Ed Rendell voiced support for the measure and would be joined by Kathleen McGinty, Secretary of the Department of Environmental Protection, and Dennis Yablonsky, Secretary of the Department of Community and Economic Development with the trio touring the region to urge for voters to pass the motion. The city would largely be an expansion of Hermitage, whose city government would be retained including the office of mayor and its nine-member city council. The merger would have kept the various independent school districts intact. The effort would ultimately be defeated, and via the ordinance the issue of merger could not be brought up again until 2009.

In 2018, Wheatland formed a commission on the possibility of continuing its independence in a 137–73 vote. On November 8, 2022, a referendum was held over annexation into Hermitage which passed, stipulating automatic annexation on January 1, 2024. On top of the lack of feasibility to continue to financially support the borough, one of the leading causes for annexation was Hermitage's more pro-business outlook. Wheatland Borough Council would have its last ever meeting on December 12, 2023, lasting just 10 minutes; councilors and six-year mayor Ronald Viglio reflected on their service to their community, and where joined with officials from Hermitage thanking them for "friendship and kindness" in the annexation process. The borough was merged into Hermitage on January 1, 2024. The former borough council hall will be preserved as a museum on the history of Wheatland.

== Geography ==
Wheatland was located at 41°12′1″N 80°29′45″W (41.200389, -80.495709).

According to the United States Census Bureau, the borough had a total area of 0.9 square miles (2.3 km^{2}), all land.

== Demographics ==
Historical population
Census	Pop.	Note	%±
1880	583		—
1890	575		−1.4%
1900	655		13.9%
1910	955		45.8%
1920	1,742		82.4%
1930	1,518		−12.9%
1940	1,421		−6.4%
1950	1,402		−1.3%
1960	1,813		29.3%
1970	1,421		−21.6%
1980	1,132		−20.3%
1990	760		−32.9%
2000	748		−1.6%
2010	632		−15.5%
2020	585		−7.4%
2021 (est.)	578	▼	−1.2%

As of the census of 2000, there were 748 people, 349 households, and 202 families residing in the borough. The population density was 847.8 inhabitants per square mile (327.3/km^{2}). There were 379 housing units at an average density of 429.6 per square mile (165.9/km^{2}). The racial makeup of the borough was 85.96% White, 12.03% African American, 0.13% Asian, 0.13% from other races, and 1.74% from two or more races. Hispanic or Latino of any race were 1.07% of the population.

There were 349 households, out of which 17.8% had children under the age of 18 living with them, 41.5% were married couples living together, 11.2% had a female householder with no husband present, and 42.1% were non-families. 38.1% of all households were made up of individuals, and 20.9% had someone living alone who was 65 years of age or older. The average household size was 2.14 and the average family size was 2.85.

In the borough the population was spread out, with 18.3% under the age of 18, 5.5% from 18 to 24, 25.8% from 25 to 44, 22.7% from 45 to 64, and 27.7% who were 65 years of age or older. The median age was 46 years. For every 100 females there were 85.1 males. For every 100 females age 18 and over, there were 82.9 males.

The median income for a household in the borough was $27,596, and the median income for a family was $34,250. Males had a median income of $30,521 versus $18,409 for females. The per capita income for the borough was $15,365. About 8.3% of families and 14.4% of the population were below the poverty line, including 21.4% of those under age 18 and 12.7% of those age 65 or over.
