= Special routes of U.S. Route 62 =

Special routes of U.S. Route 62

Highway system
- United States Numbered Highway System; List; Special; Divided

Sixteen special routes of U.S. Route 62 currently exist. Seven of them lie within the state of Arkansas. Three existed in the past but have since been decommissioned.

== Oklahoma ==
=== Snyder business loop ===
U.S. Highway 62 Business
- Location: Snyder, Oklahoma
- Length: 7.6 mi (12.2 km)

Business U.S. Highway 62 (Bus. US 62) is a business route of US 62 in Snyder, Oklahoma that is 7.6 miles (12.2 km) long. It starts at US 62 west of Snyder, intersects U.S. Route 183 in Snyder, and ends at US 62 east of Snyder.

Major intersections

The entire route is in Kiowa County.

| Location | mi | km | Destinations | Notes |
|---|---|---|---|---|
| | 0.0 | 0.0 | US 62 – Lawton, Altus | Western terminus |
| Snyder | 4.7 | 7.6 | US 183 (H Street) – Lawton, Hobart, Frederick | |
| | 7.7 | 12.4 | US 62 – Lawton, Altus | Eastern terminus |
1.000 mi = 1.609 km; 1.000 km = 0.621 mi

=== Henryetta business loop ===
U.S. Highway 62 Business
- Location: Henryetta, Oklahoma
- Length: 2.94 mi (4.73 km)

U.S. Route 62 Business in Henryetta, Oklahoma, in Okmulgee County is another business route of US 62. The route is 2.94 miles (4.73 km) in length. It begins at I-40 exit 237 west of town. It then continues east through the town to end at US-62/75 east of downtown. The entirety of the route is concurrent with Business Loop I-40 and U.S. 75 Business.

=== Muskogee business loop ===
U.S. Highway 62 Business
- Location: Muskogee, Oklahoma

U.S. Route 62 Business in Muskogee, Oklahoma, in Muskogee County is a third business route of US 62 in Oklahoma. The route runs in an overlap with U.S. Route 64 Business along-Okmulgee Avenue and then turns north away from that route along North Main Street.

=== Tahlequah business loop ===
U.S. Highway 62 Business
- Location: Tahlequah, Oklahoma

U.S. Route 62 Business in Tahlequah, Oklahoma, in Cherokee County, Oklahoma is a fourth business route of US 62 in Oklahoma. The route runs along former sections of the main route along Muskogee Avenue beginning at the western terminus of US 62/OK 82's overlap with OK 51, then runs north into downtown Tahlequah, where it turns right running east along East Downing Street until reaching its terminus at the east end of the US 62/OK 82 overlap.

== Arkansas ==
=== Prairie Grove business spur ===
U.S. Highway 62B
- Location: Prairie Grove, Arkansas
- Length: 0.739 mi (1,189 m)
- Existed: November 20, 2014–present

U.S. Route 62 Business (US 62B and Hwy. 62B) is a business route of U.S. Route 62 in Prairie Grove, Washington County, Arkansas.

The route begins at US 62 in Prairie Grove and runs west to the entrance drive for Prairie Grove Battlefield State Park.

The route was approved by AASHTO following completion of a bypass around Prairie Grove. The parent route designation was shifted to the new terrain alignment, with the former alignment becoming US 62B. In February 2021, city officials requested ArDOT decommission the route as a state highway making it a city street. It was truncated to Prairie Grove Battlefield State Park in February 2023, with the remainder becoming a city street.

Major intersections

The entire route is in Prairie Grove, Washington County.

| mi | km | Destinations | Notes |
|---|---|---|---|
| 0.000 | 0.000 | US 62 – Fayetteville, Lincoln | Eastern terminus |
| 0.739 | 1.189 | End state maintenance | Western terminus |
1.000 mi = 1.609 km; 1.000 km = 0.621 mi

=== Fayetteville business loop ===
U.S. Highway 62B
- Location: Fayetteville, Arkansas
- Existed: May 27, 1970–October 31, 1984

U.S. Route 62 Business (US 62B and Hwy. 62B) in Fayetteville, Arkansas was a business route of 6 miles (9.7 km) in Fayetteville, Washington County, Arkansas.

Major intersections

The entire route was in Fayetteville, Washington County.

| mi | km | Destinations | Notes |
|---|---|---|---|
| 0 | 0.0 | US 62 / US 71 | Southern terminus |
| | | AR 112 north (Razorback Road) | AR 112 southern terminus |
| | | US 71B (School Avenue) | Southern end of US 71B concurrency |
| | | AR 45 north (Lafayette Street) | AR 45 southern terminus |
| | | AR 180 west (Township Street) | Eastern end of AR 180 concurrency |
| 6 | 9.7 | US 62 / US 71 | Northern terminus; Northern end of US 71B concurrency |
1.000 mi = 1.609 km; 1.000 km = 0.621 mi: Concurrency terminus

=== Rogers business spur ===
U.S. Highway 62B
- Location: Rogers, Arkansas
- Length: 2.0 mi (3.2 km)
- Existed: November 6, 1980–August 17, 2010

U.S. Route 62 Business (US 62B and Hwy. 62B) in Rogers, Arkansas was a business route of 1.99 miles (3.20 km) in east Rogers. The route connected US 62 to US 71B through Historic Downtown Rogers. It was replaced in 2010 by AR 12.

US 62B began at US 62 in eastern Rogers and ran due south as 2nd Street. The highway crossed the Arkansas and Missouri Railroad tracks before an intersection with AR 12 (Locust Street). The two highways form a concurrency southbound, together entering Historic Downtown Rogers. US 62B/AR 12 turn onto Walnut Street and continued together westward. US 62B terminates at 8th Street, which carries the US 71B designation south and AR 94 designation northbound. Walnut Street continues west as US 71B/AR 12 toward Bentonville.

Major intersections

The entire route was in Rogers, Benton County.

| mi | km | Destinations | Notes |
|---|---|---|---|
| 0.0 | 0.0 | US 62 (Hudson Road) | Northern terminus |
| 1.2 | 1.9 | AR 12 east (Locust Street) | Eastern end of AR 12 concurrency |
| 1.6 | 2.6 | 2nd Street south / Walnut Street east | Former AR 12 |
| 2.0 | 3.2 | US 71B / AR 12 west / AR 94 east (Walnut Street / 8th Street) | Southern terminus, Western end of AR 12 concurrency, AR 94 western terminus |
1.000 mi = 1.609 km; 1.000 km = 0.621 mi: Concurrency terminus

=== Eureka Springs business loop ===
U.S. Highway 62B
- Location: Eureka Springs, Arkansas
- Existed: c. 1935–1990

U.S. Route 62 Business (US 62B and Hwy. 62B) is a former business route in Eureka Springs, Arkansas, now known as Historic Loop. It was originally known as U.S. Route 62 City (US 62C).

=== Berryville spur ===
Oak View Drive
- Location: Berryville, Arkansas
- Length: 0.671 mi (1,080 m)
- Existed: March 26, 1975–present

U.S. Route 62 Spur (US 62S, Hwy. 62S, and Oak View Drive) is a spur route of U.S. Route 62 in Berryville, Arkansas.

The route's western terminus is at US 62 in west Berryville. The route runs east as Oak View Drive, passing the industrial park area of the city. |name=Oak View Drive State maintenance ends at a fork in the road with A. L. Carter Street to the north and Oak View Drive continuing south.

This roadway was added to the state highway system on March 26, 1975, by the Arkansas State Highway Commission to serve the industrial park of Berryville.

Major intersections

The entire route is in Berryville, Carroll County.

| mi | km | Destinations | Notes |
|---|---|---|---|
| 0.000 | 0.000 | US 62 (Trimble Street) | Western terminus |
| 0.671 | 1.080 | End state maintenance at A. L. Carter Street/Oak View Drive intersection | Eastern terminus |
1.000 mi = 1.609 km; 1.000 km = 0.621 mi

=== Pyatt spur ===
U.S. Highway 62S
- Location: Pyatt, Arkansas
- Length: 0.700 mi (1,127 m)

U.S. Route 62 Spur (US 62S and Hwy. 62S) is a 0.70-mile (1.13 km) spur route of U.S. Route 62 in Pyatt, Arkansas.

The route's southern terminus is at US 62/US 412 at the south edge of Pyatt. The route runs north into downtown Pyatt, connecting the residential area with Highway 62. The route passes the Pyatt School Building and crosses Crooked Creek on the National Register of Historic Places (NRHP) listed Crooked Creek Bridge. State maintenance ends at County Route 321 (CR 321), locally named Bradford Street.

Major intersections

The entire route is in Pyatt, Marion County.

| mi | km | Destinations | Notes |
|---|---|---|---|
| 0.000 | 0.000 | US 62 / US 412 | Southern terminus |
| 0.41 | 0.66 | Crooked Creek Bridge | |
| 0.700 | 1.127 | CR 321 (Bradford Street) | Northern terminus |
1.000 mi = 1.609 km; 1.000 km = 0.621 mi

=== Yellville business route ===
Old Main Street
- Location: Yellville, Arkansas
- Length: 0.45 mi (720 m)
- Existed: 1980s–present

U.S. Route 62 Business (US 62B, Hwy. 62B, and Old Main Street) is a 0.45-mile (0.72 km) business route of U.S. Route 62 in Marion County, Arkansas.

The route's eastern terminus is at US 62/US 412 in downtown Yellville. The route runs due east as Old Main Street through downtown Yellville, connecting the residential area with Highway 62. The route passes the Yellville Public Library, the Layton Building, and the Marion County Courthouse, with the last two properties being National Register of Historic Places (NRHP) listed. The route turns north onto Berry Street for one block, when it terminates at US 62/US 412/AR 14.

Major intersections

The entire route is in Yellville, Marion County.

| mi | km | Destinations | Notes |
|---|---|---|---|
| 0.00 | 0.00 | US 62 / US 412 | Western terminus |
| 0.45 | 0.72 | US 62 / US 412 / AR 14 | Eastern terminus |
1.000 mi = 1.609 km; 1.000 km = 0.621 mi

=== Cotter business route ===
U.S. Highway 62B
- Location: Cotter, Arkansas
- Length: 2.959 mi (4.762 km)
- Existed: January 11, 1989–present

U.S. Route 62 Business (US 62B and Hwy. 62B) is a 2.97-mile (4.78 km) business route of U.S. Route 62 in Baxter County, Arkansas and Marion County, Arkansas.

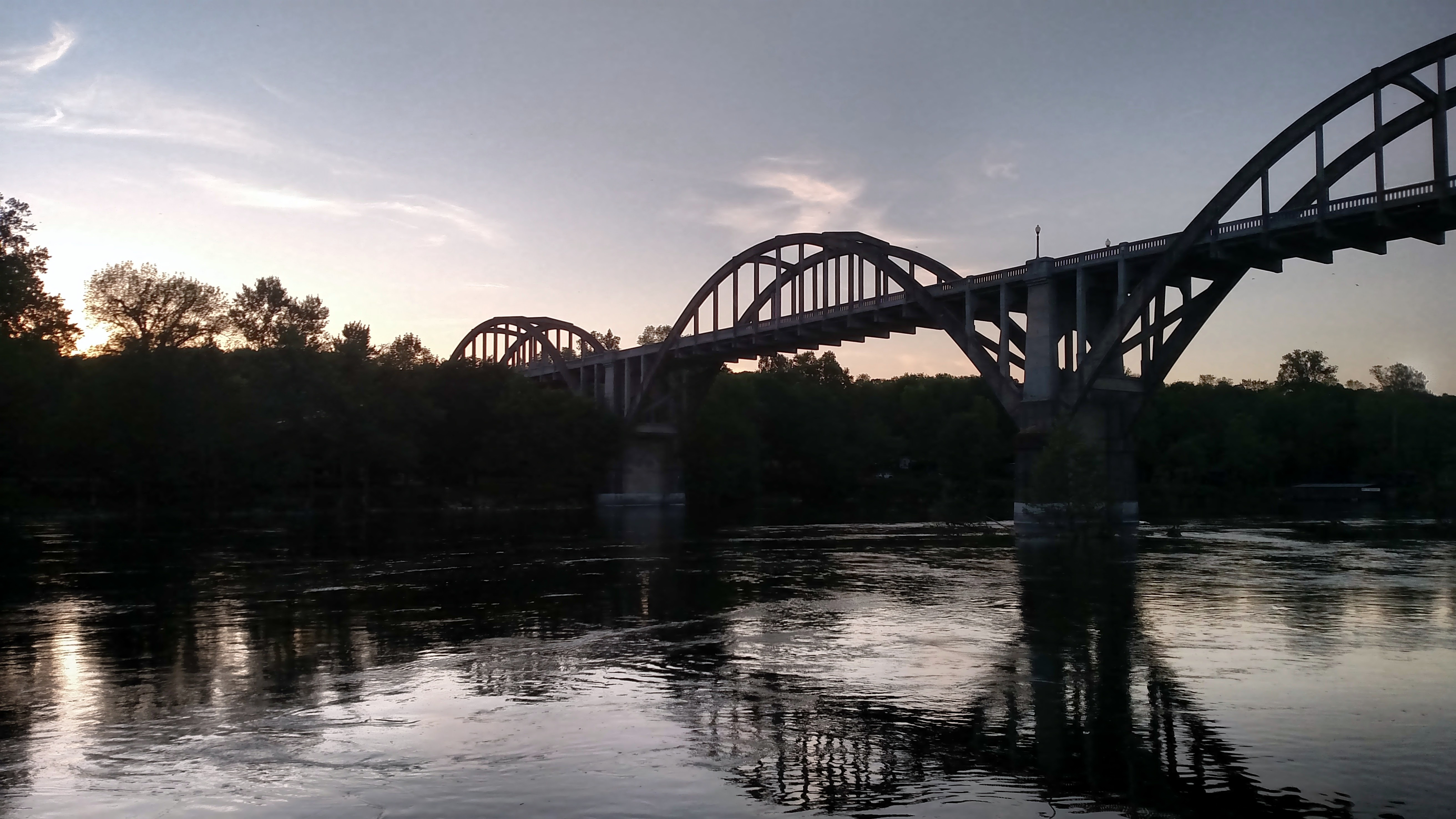
Highway 62B enters Cotter over the White River on the Cotter Bridge

The route's eastern terminus is at US 62/US 412 west of Cotter. The route runs east as Ruthven Street on the Cotter Bridge over the White River. Now entering downtown Cotter, the route serves as the southern terminus for Highway 354 and follows Harding Boulevard into downtown Cotter. The route passes the Old Cotter High School Gymnasium listed on the National Register of Historic Places (NRHP). Continuing northeast, the route nears the Cotter Water Tower before terminating at US 62/US 412.

The route was formed between 1989 and 1990 when a bypass of Cotter was completed. A new bridge replaced the Cotter Bridge as the primary route over the White River to complete the transition. On May 23, 2017, AASHTO received and approved recognition of the business route.

Major intersections

| County | Location | mi | km | Destinations | Notes |
|---|---|---|---|---|---|
| Marion | | 0.00 | 0.00 | US 62 / US 412 – Harrison, Mountain Home | Western terminus |
| White River | | 0.64– 0.824 | 1.03– 1.326 | Cotter Bridge | |
| Baxter | Cotter | 1.18 | 1.90 | AR 345 north – Cotter Springs Access White River | AR 345 southern terminus |
| Baxter | Cotter | 2.959 | 4.762 | US 62 / US 412 (Main Street) | Eastern terminus |
1.000 mi = 1.609 km; 1.000 km = 0.621 mi

=== Mountain Home business route ===
U.S. Highway 62B
- Location: Mountain Home, Arkansas
- Length: 4.78 mi (7.69 km)
- Existed: c. 1998–present

U.S. Route 62 Business (US 62B and Hwy. 62B) is a 4.78-mile (7.69 km) business route of U.S. Route 62 in Baxter County, Arkansas.

The route's southern terminus is at US 62/US 412 in the southwest part of Mountain Home. The route runs northeast to meet Highway 178. Further northeast the route forms a concurrency with Highway 5/Highway 201, becoming Main Street, and passing the Mountain Home Commercial Historic District and Baxter County Courthouse. These two properties are both listed on the National Register of Historic Places (NRHP). Approaching a fork in the road, Highway 5/Highway 201 split to the left, and Highway 62B continues to the right. Now heading east the route intersects a second alignment of Highway 178 before terminating at US 62/US 412. On May 23, 2017, AASHTO received and approved recognition of the business route.

Major intersections

The entire route is in Mountain Home, Baxter County.

| mi | km | Destinations | Notes |
|---|---|---|---|
| 0.00 | 0.00 | US 62 / US 412 | Southern terminus |
| 1.28 | 2.06 | AR 5 (9th Street) to AR 201 | |
| 1.33 | 2.14 | AR 5 south / AR 201 south (Main Street) | |
| 1.38 | 2.22 | AR 178 west (6th Street) | |
| 1.70 | 2.74 | AR 5 north / AR 201 north | |
| 3.58 | 5.76 | AR 178 east | |
| 4.78 | 7.69 | US 62 / US 412 | Northern terminus |
1.000 mi = 1.609 km; 1.000 km = 0.621 mi: Concurrency terminus

=== Salem business route ===
U.S. Highway 62B
- Location: Salem, Arkansas

U.S. Route 62 Business (US 62B and Hwy. 62B) is a 1.21-mile (1.95 km) business route of US 62 in Fulton County, Arkansas.

The route's western terminus is at US 62/US 412 in west Salem. US 62B runs east along Church Street to the town square, where it turns south along Highway 9. The two concurrent routes continue south along Main Street until meeting US 62/US 412, when US 62B terminates and AR 9 continues south.

Major intersections

The entire route is in Salem, Fulton County.

| mi | km | Destinations | Notes |
|---|---|---|---|
| 0.00 | 0.00 | US 62 / US 412 | Western terminus |
| 0.99 | 1.59 | AR 9 north (Main Street) | Western end of AR 9 concurrency |
| 1.21 | 1.95 | US 62 / US 412 / AR 9 south (Main Street) | Eastern end of AR 9 concurrency, eastern terminus |
1.000 mi = 1.609 km; 1.000 km = 0.621 mi: Concurrency terminus

== Kentucky ==
=== Elizabethtown truck route ===
U.S. Highway 62 Truck
- Location: Elizabethtown, Kentucky
- Length: 4.545 mi (7.314 km)

U.S. Route 62 Truck (US 62 Truck) is a 4.545-mile (7.314 km) truck route around Elizabethtown. For its entire course, it is concurrent with other highways. The route is concurrent with the following routes:

- Interstate 65 from exit 93 to exit 91-B,
- Wendell H. Ford Western Kentucky Parkway from the I-65 junction to exit 135 (for US 31W BYP), and
- US 31W Bypass from the WK Parkway interchange to the US 62 junction.

Major intersections

The entire route is in Elizabethtown, Hardin County.

| mi | km | Exit | Destinations | Notes |
|---|---|---|---|---|
| 0.000 | 0.000 | | US 62 (South Mulberry Street) / US 31W Byp. north (Elizabethtown Bypass) | Western terminus; west end of US 31W Byp. overlap |
| 0.725 | 1.167 | 136 | Western Kentucky Parkway west – Leitchfield, Paducah | West end of Western Kentucky Pkwy overlap |
| 1.477 | 2.377 | 137B — 91 | I-65 south / Western Kentucky Parkway east / US 31W Byp. south to US 31W / KY 61 – Nashville, Elizabethtown, Hodgenville | East end of Western Kentucky Pkwy / US 31W Byp. overlap; south end of I-65 overlap |
| 3.736 | 6.013 | 93 | Bluegrass Parkway east – Bardstown, Lexington | Western terminus of Bluegrass Pkwy; Bluegrass Pkwy exits 1A-B |
| 4.545 | 7.314 | 94 | I-65 north / US 62 / KY 61 (North Mulberry Street) – Louisville, Elizabethtown | Eastern terminus; east end of I-65 overlap |
1.000 mi = 1.609 km; 1.000 km = 0.621 mi: Concurrency terminus

=== Lawrenceburg truck route ===
U.S. Route 62 Truck
- Location: Lawrenceburg, Kentucky
- Length: 1.747 mi (2.812 km)

U.S. Route 62 Truck (US 62 Truck) is a 1.747-mile (2.812 km) truck route in Lawrenceburg, Anderson County, Kentucky, that follows the U.S. Route 127 Bypass from that route's junction with US 62 to the Kentucky Route 44 junction, then it turns east onto KY 44 into downtown Lawrenceburg.

Major intersections

The entire route is in Lawrenceburg, Anderson County.

| mi | km | Destinations | Notes |
|---|---|---|---|
| 0.000 | 0.000 | US 62 (West Broadway Street / Fox Creek Road) / US 127 Byp. | Western terminus; west end of US 127 Byp. overlap |
| 0.829 | 1.334 | KY 44 west (Glensboro Road) / US 127 Byp. north | East end of US 127 Byp. overlap; west end of KY 44 overlap |
| 1.747 | 2.812 | US 62 (East Woodford Street) / US 127 (Main Street) | Eastern terminus; east end of KY 44 overlap; eastern terminus of KY 44 |
1.000 mi = 1.609 km; 1.000 km = 0.621 mi: Concurrency terminus

== Ohio ==
=== Alliance temporary route ===
U.S. Route 62T
- Location: Alliance, Ohio
- Length: 3.15 mi (5.07 km)
- Existed: 1998–present

U.S. Route 62 Temporary (US 62T) is a 3.15-mile-long (5.07 km) bypass around the city of Alliance. US 62T, a four-lane highway, begins at US 62 (Atlantic Boulevard NE/State Street) in Stark County. US 62T then has a highway ramp at Beeson Street. Exit ramps provide access from US 62T to Beeson St NE, and then the highway merges onto State Route 225 (SR 225) and ends.

Although the US 62T designation is unsigned, signs on the road read "To West US 62 / To State Route 225 North". The entire route is built to freeway standards with a speed limit of 60 miles per hour (97 km/h).

US 62T is planned to extend to Youngstown by 2030.

Major intersections

The entire route is in Alliance, Stark County. All exits are unnumbered.

| mi | km | Destinations | Notes |
|---|---|---|---|
| 0.00 | 0.00 | US 62 / SR 173 – Alliance, Canton | Diamond interchange |
| 2.38 | 3.83 | Beeson Street | Diamond interchange |
| 3.15 | 5.07 | SR 225 – Alliance, Ravenna | Diamond interchange |
1.000 mi = 1.609 km; 1.000 km = 0.621 mi

== Pennsylvania ==
=== Sharon business loop ===
U.S. Route 62 Business
- Location: Sharon, Pennsylvania

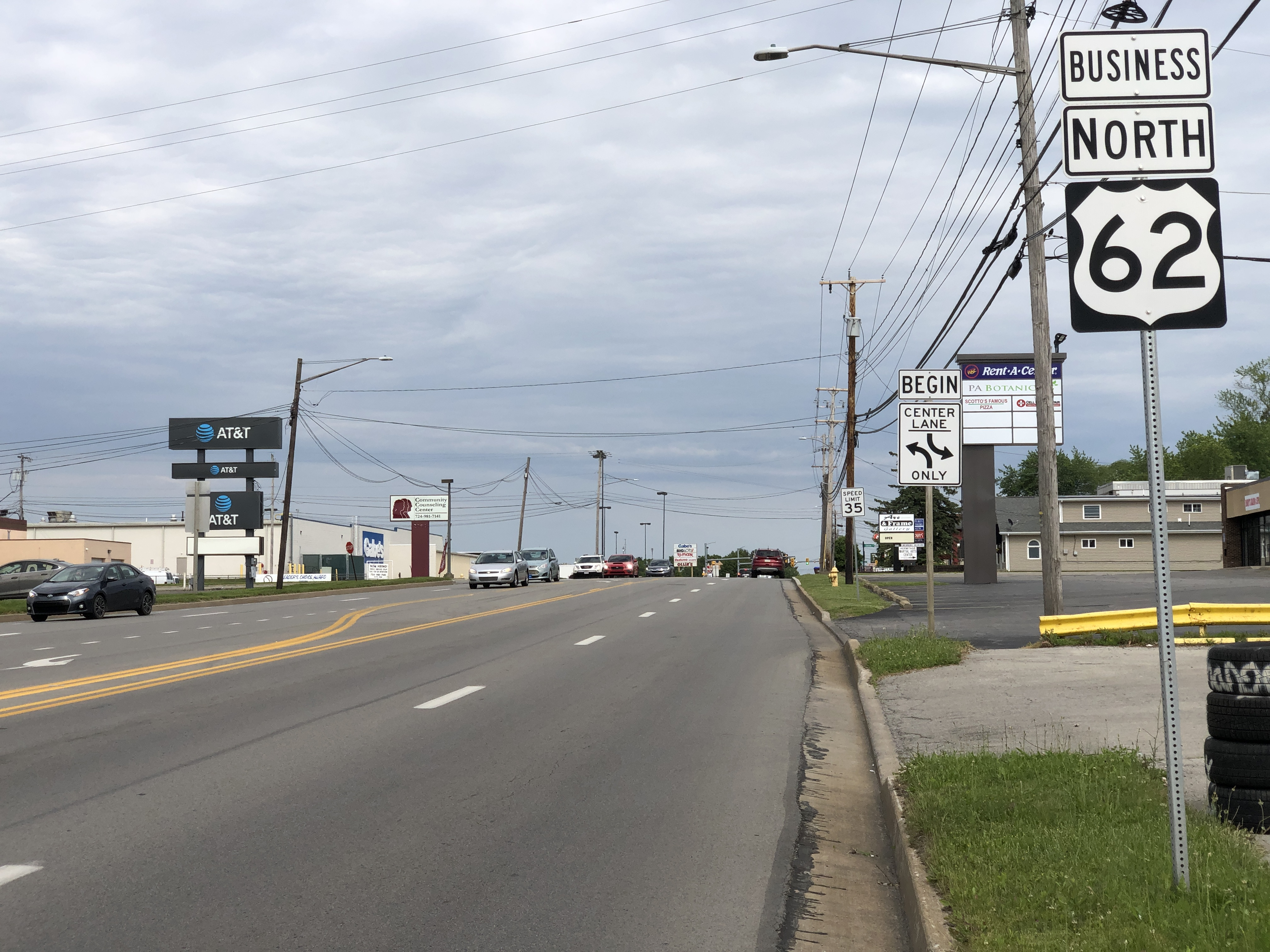
US 62 Bus. northbound in Hermitage

U.S. Route 62 Business is a through street in Sharon and Hermitage, Pennsylvania. The route was designated in 1958, after the mainline was moved onto the Shenango Valley Freeway (which is not a true freeway, but instead features at-grade intersections). For its first mile, the route is cosigned with other highways, first Pennsylvania Route 718, then Pennsylvania Route 518. Soon afterward, it expands to four-lanes and contains the hub of commercial development for the region.

== New York ==
=== Niagara Falls business loop ===
U.S. Route 62 Business
- Location: Niagara Falls, New York
- Existed: 2006–present

U.S. Route 62 Business follows Pine Avenue through downtown Niagara Falls, New York, spanning 2.12 miles (3.41 km) between NY 104 at its western terminus and US 62 at its eastern extent. Although it runs in a mostly east–west direction, it is signed as a north–south route due to US 62 being signed north–south as well within New York.

Pine Avenue was originally designated as part of NY 34 in the 1920s. It then became part of NY 18 after it replaced NY 34 in 1930. In 1932, US 62 was extended into New York and overlapped NY 18 between Dayton and Niagara Falls. NY 18 was truncated to Lewiston, a village north of the city, in the early 1960s, making US 62 the sole occupant of Pine Avenue. US 62 was shifted onto its current alignment through the city later in the decade, allowing Pine Avenue to become New York State Route 62A in the 1970s. NY 62A was redesignated as US 62 Business in 2006.

== See also ==
- List of special routes of the United States Numbered Highway System
