= Lackawannock Township, Pennsylvania =

Township in Pennsylvania, US

Coordinates: 41°12′00″N 80°19′59″W

Lackawannock Township, Mercer County, Pennsylvania
- Township
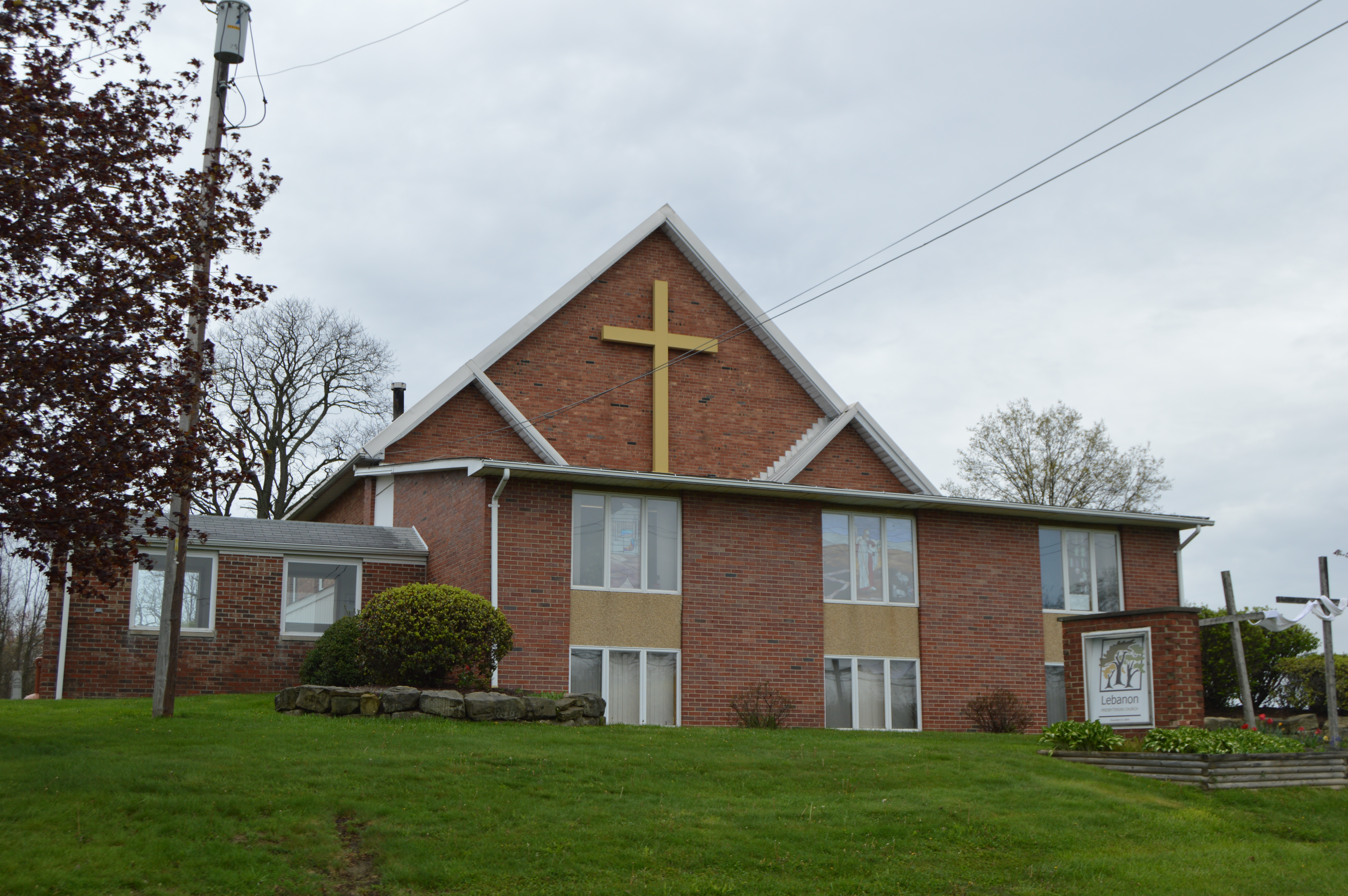
- Lebanon Presbyterian Church, Pennsylvania Route 318 west of Greenfield

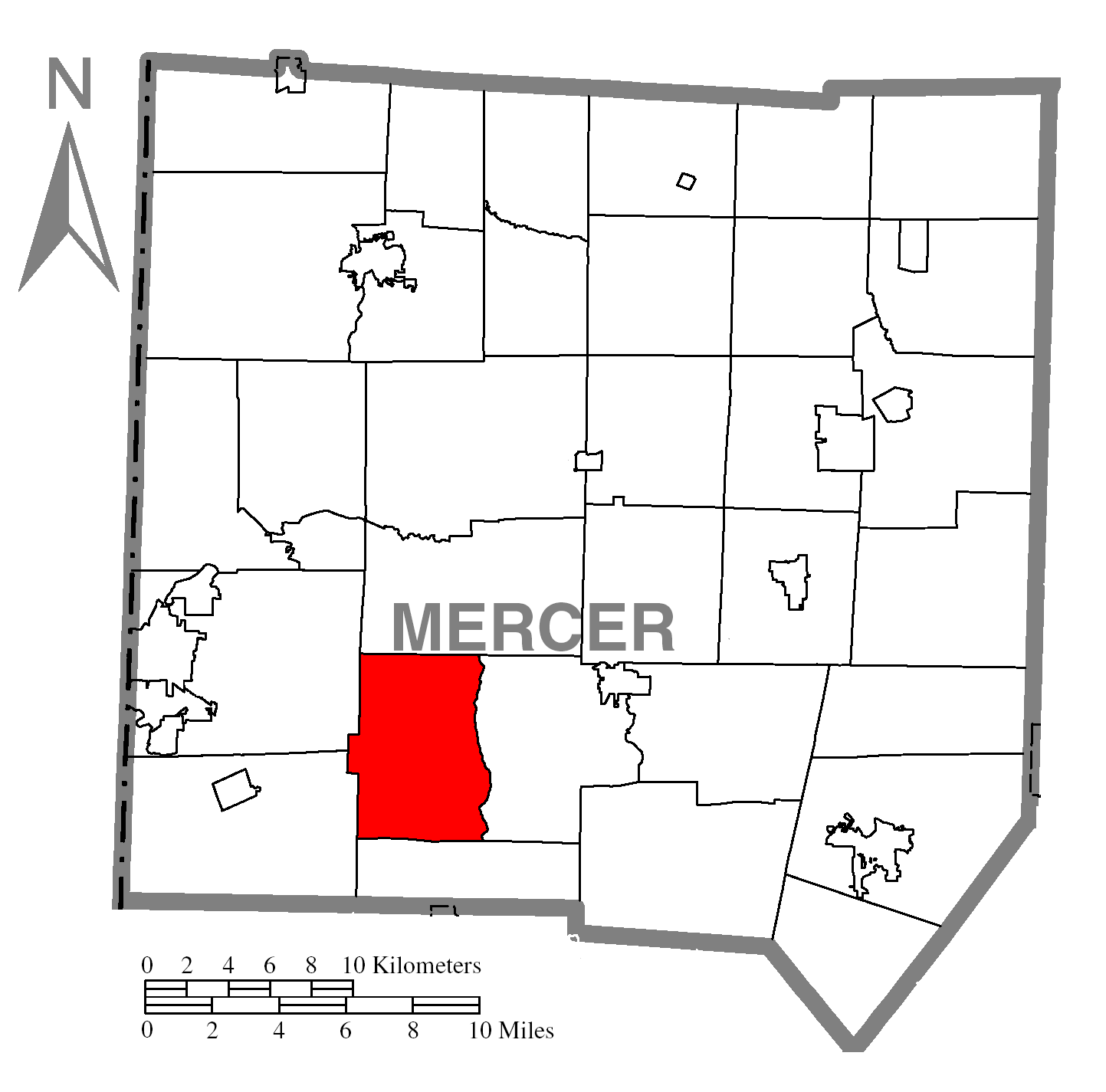
- Location of Lackawannock Township in Mercer County

- Location of Mercer County in Pennsylvania
- Country: United States
- State: Pennsylvania
- County: Mercer

Area
  - Total: 20.93 sq mi (54.20 km^{2})
  - Land: 20.92 sq mi (54.18 km^{2})
  - Water: 0.0077 sq mi (0.02 km^{2})

Population (2020)
  - Total: 2,479
  - Estimate (2023): 2,463
  - Density: 124.3/sq mi (47.98/km^{2})
- Time zone: UTC-4 (EST)
  - Summer (DST): UTC-5 (EDT)
- Area code: 724
- FIPS code: 42-085-40760

Historical population
Census	Pop.	Note	%±
2000	2,561		—
2010	2,662		3.9%
2020	2,479		−6.9%
2023 (est.)	2,463		−0.6%
U.S. Decennial Census

Lackawannock Township is a township in Mercer County, Pennsylvania, United States. The population was 2,469 at the 2020 census, a decline from the figure of 2,662 in 2010. The origin of its name is disputed. One source contends that it was named for the Lackawanna River in eastern Pennsylvania, while another claims that it comes from the French word for "lake" (lac) and the name of a Native American chief (Wannock) who lived in the area.

== Geography ==
According to the United States Census Bureau, the township has a total area of 20.8 square miles (54 km^{2}), of which 20.8 square miles (54 km^{2}) is land and 0.05% is water.

== Demographics ==
As of the census of 2000, there were 2,561 people, 909 households, and 705 families residing in the township. The population density was 123.4 inhabitants per square mile (47.6/km^{2}). There were 952 housing units at an average density of 45.9 per square mile (17.7/km^{2}). The racial makeup of the township was 97.74% White, 0.86% Black or African American, 0.31% Native American, 0.20% Asian, 0.04% Pacific Islander, 0.51% from other races, and 0.35% from two or more races. Hispanic or Latino of any race were 0.78% of the population.

There were 909 households, out of which 35.0% had children under the age of 18 living with them, 64.9% were married couples living together, 8.7% had a female householder with no husband present, and 22.4% were non-families. 18.8% of all households were made up of individuals, and 8.0% had someone living alone who was 65 years of age or older. The average household size was 2.81 and the average family size was 3.23.

In the township the population was spread out, with 29.1% under the age of 18, 8.0% from 18 to 24, 27.5% from 25 to 44, 24.0% from 45 to 64, and 11.4% who were 65 years of age or older. The median age was 35 years. For every 100 females there were 99.6 males. For every 100 females age 18 and over, there were 95.9 males.

The median income for a household in the township was $35,428, and the median income for a family was $40,579. Males had a median income of $30,430 versus $21,341 for females. The per capita income for the township was $15,711. About 9.5% of families and 13.1% of the population were below the poverty line, including 19.5% of those under age 18 and 8.2% of those age 65 or over.
