= Dennis Yablonsky =

American politician

Secretary of the Pennsylvania Department of Community and Economic Development
- In office February 2003 – October 2008

Personal details
- Party: Republican
- Spouse: Veronica
- Education: University of Cincinnati

Dennis Yablonsky was the CEO of the Allegheny Conference from 2008 to 2017, when he retired. He previously served as a member of Pennsylvania Governor Ed Rendell's cabinet as Secretary of Pennsylvania Department of Community and Economic Development. He was nominated for that position in 2003. He resigned in 2008.

He holds a degree from the University of Cincinnati. He was CEO of Carnegie Group Incorporated from 1987 through 1999. Prior to that, he served in various roles, including President and CEO, for Cincom Systems.

He was named to the PoliticsPA list of "Pennsylvania's Smartest Staffers and Operatives."
