= South Pymatuning Township, Pennsylvania =

Township in Pennsylvania, US

Coordinates: 41°17′N 80°29′W

South Pymatuning Township, Mercer County, Pennsylvania
- Township
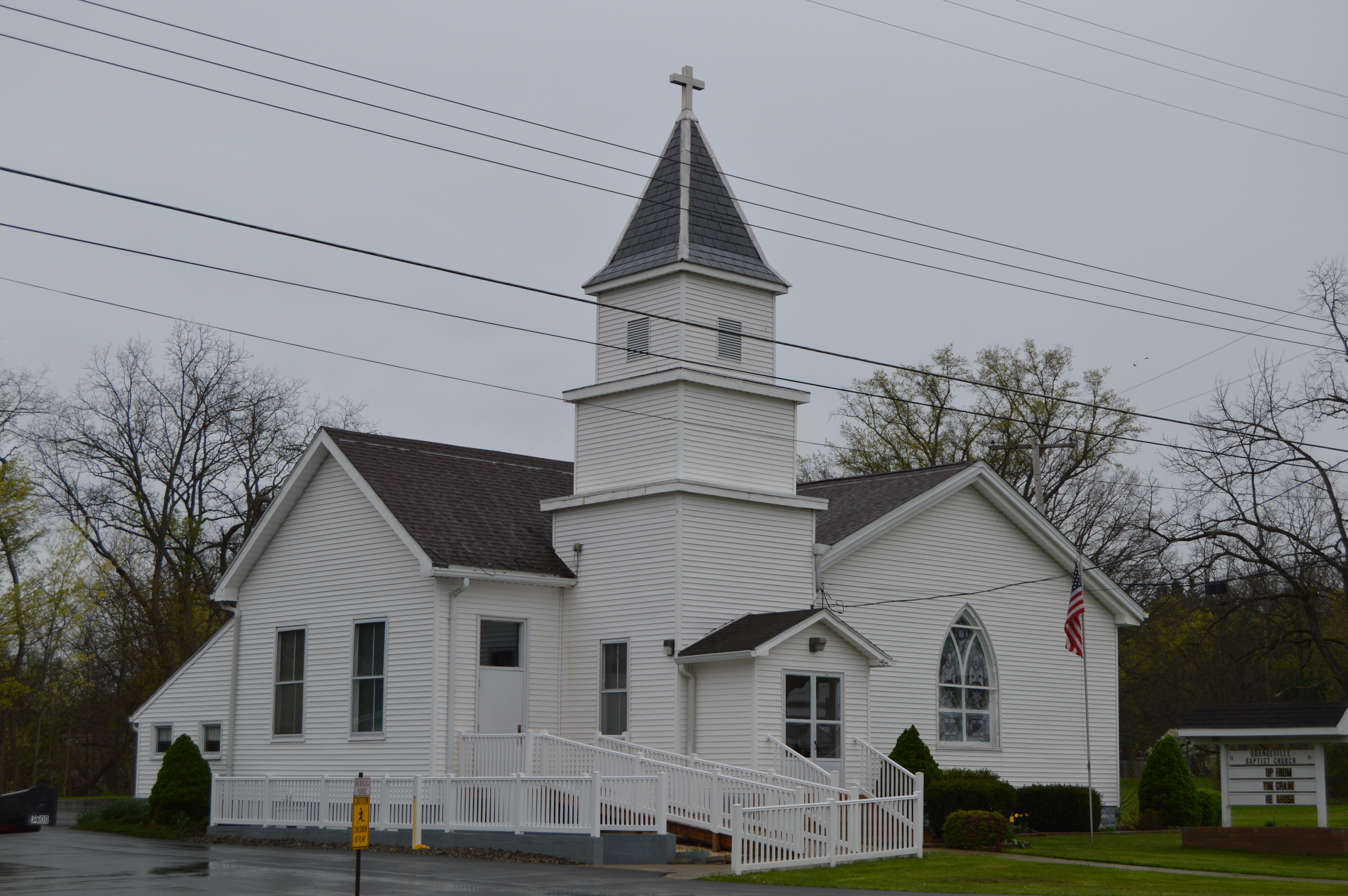
- Orangeville Baptist Church, on the Ohio state line

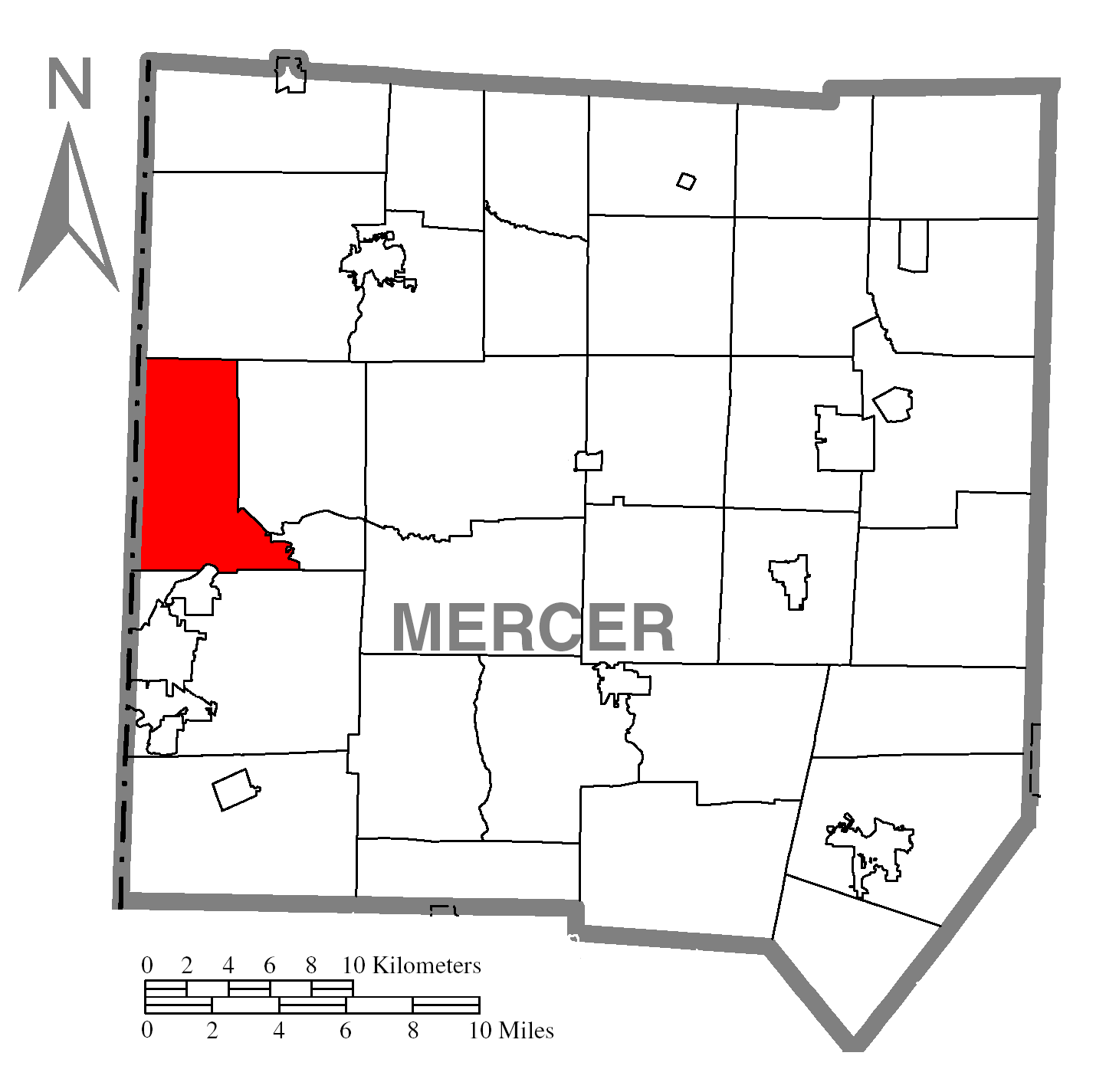
- Location of South Pymatuning Township in Mercer County

- Location of Mercer County in Pennsylvania
- Country: United States
- State: Pennsylvania
- County: Mercer

Area
  - Total: 21.63 sq mi (56.01 km^{2})
  - Land: 19.56 sq mi (50.67 km^{2})
  - Water: 2.06 sq mi (5.34 km^{2})

Population (2020)
  - Total: 2,653
  - Estimate (2022): 2,616
  - Density: 133.0/sq mi (51.35/km^{2})
- Time zone: UTC-4 (EST)
  - Summer (DST): UTC-5 (EDT)
- Area code: 724
- FIPS code: 42-085-72440
- Website: http://www.southpy.com/

Historical population
Census	Pop.	Note	%±
2000	2,857		—
2010	2,695		−5.7%
2020	2,650		−1.7%
2022 (est.)	2,616		−1.3%
U.S. Decennial Census

South Pymatuning Township is a township in Mercer County, Pennsylvania, United States. The population was 2,650 at the 2020 census, a decrease from 2,695 in 2010.

== Geography ==
According to the United States Census Bureau, the township has a total area of 21.5 square miles (55.6 km^{2}), of which 19.3 square miles (50.1 km^{2}) is land and 2.1 square miles (5.5 km^{2}) (9.97%) is water.

== Demographics ==
As of the census of 2000, there were 2,857 people, 1,131 households, and 865 families residing in the township. The population density was 147.8 inhabitants per square mile (57.1/km^{2}). There were 1,168 housing units at an average density of 60.4 per square mile (23.3/km^{2}). The racial makeup of the township was 98.81% White, 0.42% African American, 0.28% Asian, 0.11% from other races, and 0.39% from two or more races. Hispanic or Latino of any race were 0.32% of the population.

There were 1,131 households, out of which 29.4% had children under the age of 18 living with them, 66.8% were married couples living together, 6.6% had a female householder with no husband present, and 23.5% were non-families. 21.4% of all households were made up of individuals, and 12.2% had someone living alone who was 65 years of age or older. The average household size was 2.53 and the average family size was 2.94.

In the township the population was spread out, with 22.2% under the age of 18, 5.1% from 18 to 24, 28.6% from 25 to 44, 25.9% from 45 to 64, and 18.2% who were 65 years of age or older. The median age was 42 years. For every 100 females there were 96.2 males. For every 100 females age 18 and over, there were 94.7 males.

The median income for a household in the township was $44,102, and the median income for a family was $50,089. Males had a median income of $40,091 versus $22,639 for females. The per capita income for the township was $20,637. About 5.2% of families and 8.0% of the population were below the poverty line, including 15.2% of those under age 18 and 3.3% of those age 65 or over.
