= Shenango Township, Mercer County, Pennsylvania =

Township in Pennsylvania, US

Coordinates: 41°10′00″N 80°30′29″W

- Township
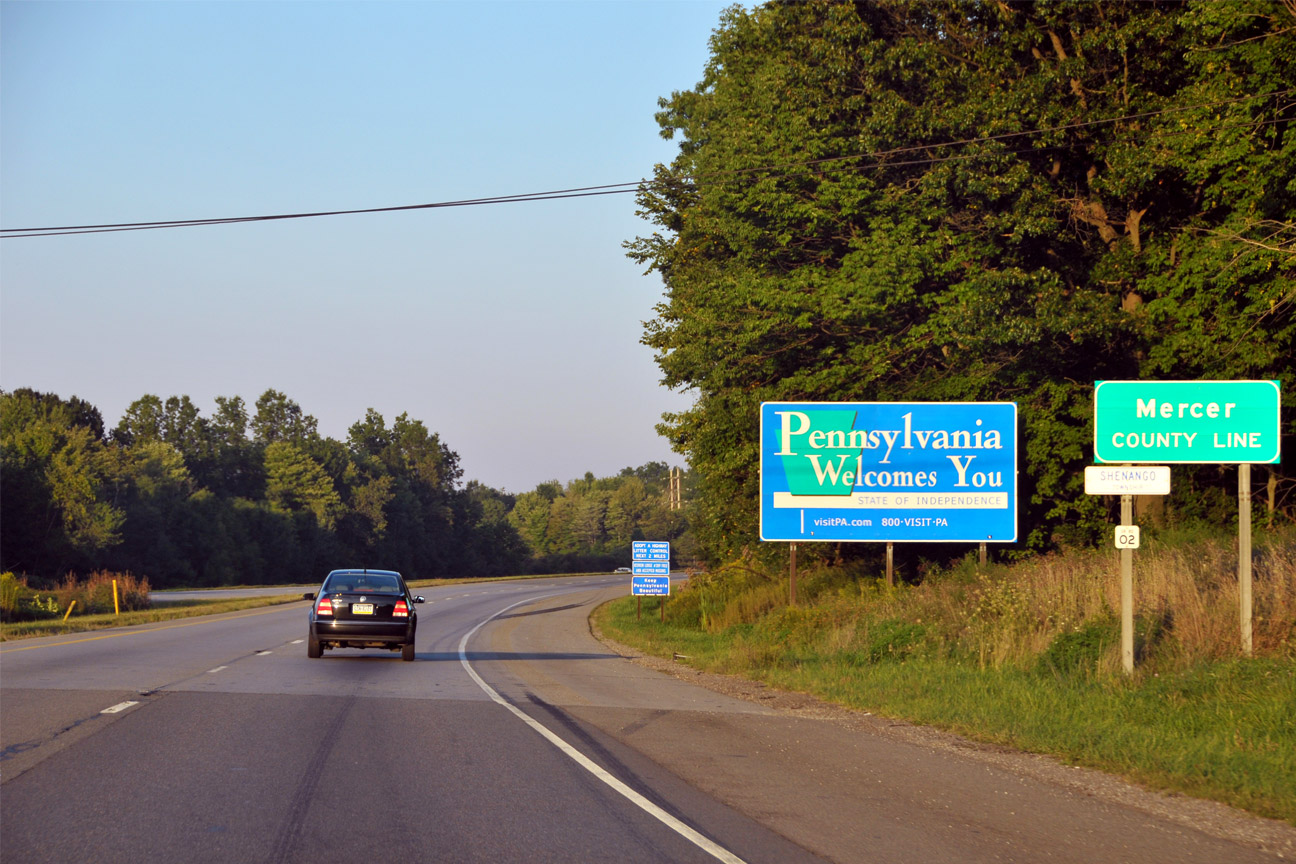
- Entering the township on Interstate 80

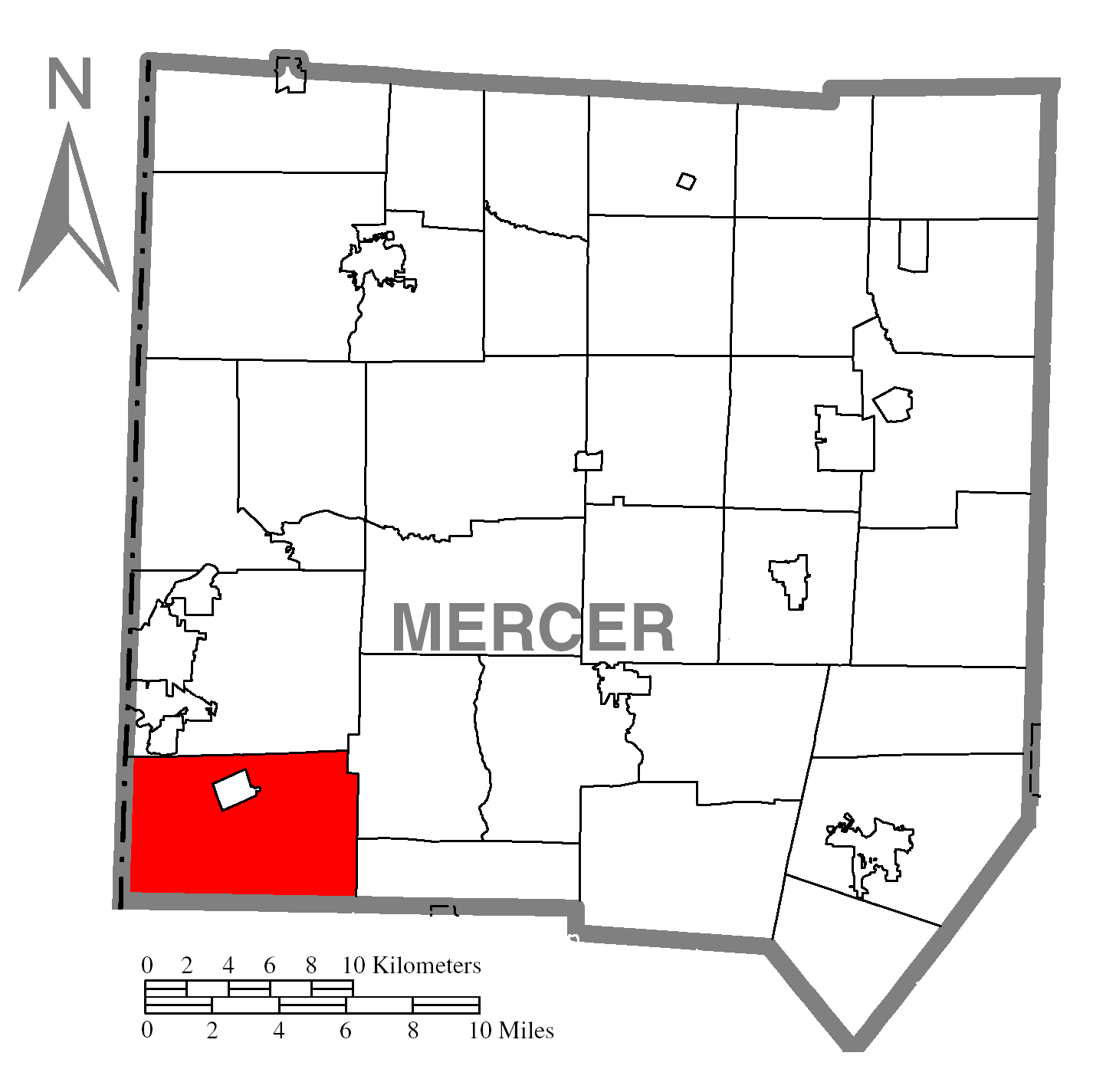
- Location of Shenango Township in Mercer County

- Location of Mercer County in Pennsylvania
- Country: United States
- State: Pennsylvania
- County: Mercer County

Area
  - Total: 30.30 sq mi (78.47 km^{2})
  - Land: 30.24 sq mi (78.33 km^{2})
  - Water: 0.054 sq mi (0.14 km^{2})

Population (2020)
  - Total: 3,520
  - Estimate (2022): 3,475
  - Density: 125.1/sq mi (48.31/km^{2})
- Time zone: UTC-4 (EST)
  - Summer (DST): UTC-5 (EDT)
- Area code: 724
- FIPS code: 42-085-70096
- Website: https://www.shenangotownship.net/

Historical population
| Census | Pop. | Note | %± |
|---|---|---|---|
| 2000 | 4,037 | | — |
| 2010 | 3,929 | | −2.7% |
| 2020 | 3,519 | | −10.4% |
| 2022 (est.) | 3,475 | | −1.3% |
U.S. Decennial Census

Shenango Township is a township in Mercer County, Pennsylvania, United States. The population was 3,519 at the 2020 census, down from 3,929 in 2010.

== Geography ==
According to the United States Census Bureau, the township has a total area of 29.9 square miles (77.5 km^{2}), of which 29.9 square miles (77.4 km^{2}) is land and 0.1 square mile (0.1 km^{2}) (0.17%) is water.

== Demographics ==
As of the census of 2000, there were 4,037 people, 1,637 households, and 1,214 families residing in the township. The population density was 135.1 inhabitants per square mile (52.2/km^{2}). There were 1,693 housing units at an average density of 56.7 per square mile (21.9/km^{2}). The racial makeup of the township was 97.42% White, 1.76% African American, 0.05% Native American, 0.10% Asian, 0.17% from other races, and 0.50% from two or more races. Hispanic or Latino of any race were 0.42% of the population.

There were 1,637 households, out of which 29.9% had children under the age of 18 living with them, 62.1% were married couples living together, 8.9% had a female householder with no husband present, and 25.8% were non-families. 22.7% of all households were made up of individuals, and 9.2% had someone living alone who was 65 years of age or older. The average household size was 2.47 and the average family size was 2.88.

In the township the population was spread out, with 23.1% under the age of 18, 6.1% from 18 to 24, 27.5% from 25 to 44, 26.4% from 45 to 64, and 17.0% who were 65 years of age or older. The median age was 41 years. For every 100 females there were 96.3 males. For every 100 females age 18 and over, there were 93.6 males.

The median income for a household in the township was $38,162, and the median income for a family was $40,833. Males had a median income of $35,148 versus $23,820 for females. The per capita income for the township was $17,728. About 7.9% of families and 9.7% of the population were below the poverty line, including 16.9% of those under age 18 and 8.3% of those age 65 or over.
