= National Register of Historic Places listings in Mercer County, Pennsylvania =

Location of Mercer County in Pennsylvania

This is a list of the National Register of Historic Places listings in Mercer County, Pennsylvania.

This is intended to be a complete list of the properties and districts on the National Register of Historic Places in Mercer County, Pennsylvania, United States. The locations of National Register properties and districts for which the latitude and longitude coordinates are included below, may be seen in a map.

There are 16 properties and districts listed on the National Register in the county.

This National Park Service list is complete through NPS recent listings posted December 5, 2025.

== Current listings ==
	Name on the Register	Image	Date listed	Location	City or town	Description
1	Wendell August Forge	Wendell August Forge	November 7, 1996 (#96001192)	620 Madison Street; 41°09′58″N 80°04′34″W	Grove City	
2	Big Bend Historical Area	Big Bend Historical Area	April 21, 1975 (#75001654)	6 miles (9.7 km) northwest of Mercer on the Shenango River; 41°17′05″N 80°19′14″W	Jefferson Township	
3	Bridge in French Creek Township	Bridge in French Creek Township	June 22, 1988 (#88000862)	Legislative Route 43074 over French Creek near Carlton; 41°28′17″N 80°01′07″W	French Creek Township	
4	Frank H. Buhl Mansion	Frank H. Buhl Mansion	December 2, 1977 (#77001175)	422 East State Street; 41°13′56″N 80°29′58″W	Sharon	
5	First Universalist Church of Sharpsville	First Universalist Church of Sharpsville	May 29, 2003 (#03000491)	131 North Mercer Avenue; 41°16′00″N 80°28′32″W	Sharpsville	
6	Gibson House	Gibson House	December 1, 1978 (#78002430)	210 Liberty Street; 41°29′05″N 80°26′22″W	Jamestown	
7	Greenville Commercial Historic District	Greenville Commercial Historic District	August 10, 2000 (#00000964)	Centered on Main, Canal, and Clinton Streets; 41°24′26″N 80°23′20″W	Greenville	
8	Johnston's Tavern	Johnston's Tavern	March 24, 1972 (#72001136)	6 miles (9.7 km) south of Mercer on U.S. Route 19; 41°09′00″N 80°13′23″W	Springfield Township	
9	Kidd's Mills Covered Bridge Historic District	Kidd's Mills Covered Bridge Historic District	December 2, 1974 (#74001793)	5 miles (8.0 km) south of Greenville off Pennsylvania Route 58; 41°21′15″N 80°23′48″W	Pymatuning Township	
10	Christiana Lindsey House	Christiana Lindsey House	January 15, 1998 (#97001655)	313 East Butler Street; 41°13′32″N 80°14′07″W	Mercer	
11	Mercer County Court House	Mercer County Court House	November 12, 1998 (#98001369)	Roughly along Diamond, Erie and Pitt Streets; 41°13′36″N 80°12′49″W	Mercer	
12	New Hamburg Historical Area	New Hamburg Historical Area	December 2, 1974 (#74001794)	7 miles south of Greenville off Pennsylvania Route 58; 41°19′14″N 80°20′17″W	Delaware Township	
13	Jonas J. Pierce House	Jonas J. Pierce House	October 24, 1996 (#96001206)	18 East Shenango Street; 41°15′57″N 80°28′28″W	Sharpsville	
14	Quaker Bridge	Quaker Bridge	June 22, 1988 (#88000863)	Legislative Route 43135 over the Little Shenango River near Greenville; 41°25′33″N 80°22′22″W	Hempfield Township	
15	Jeremiah Sturgeon Chapel	Jeremiah Sturgeon Chapel	August 14, 2025 (#100012129)	233 George Junior Road; 41°10′24″N 80°06′39″W	Grove City	
16	Alexander P. and James S. Waugh House	Alexander P. and James S. Waugh House	April 23, 1998 (#98000402)	23 West Main Street; 41°24′12″N 80°23′38″W	Greenville	

== See also ==
- List of National Historic Landmarks in Pennsylvania
- National Register of Historic Places listings in Pennsylvania
- List of Pennsylvania state historical markers in Mercer County
