= Charles Henry Owsley =

English-born American architect (1846–1935)

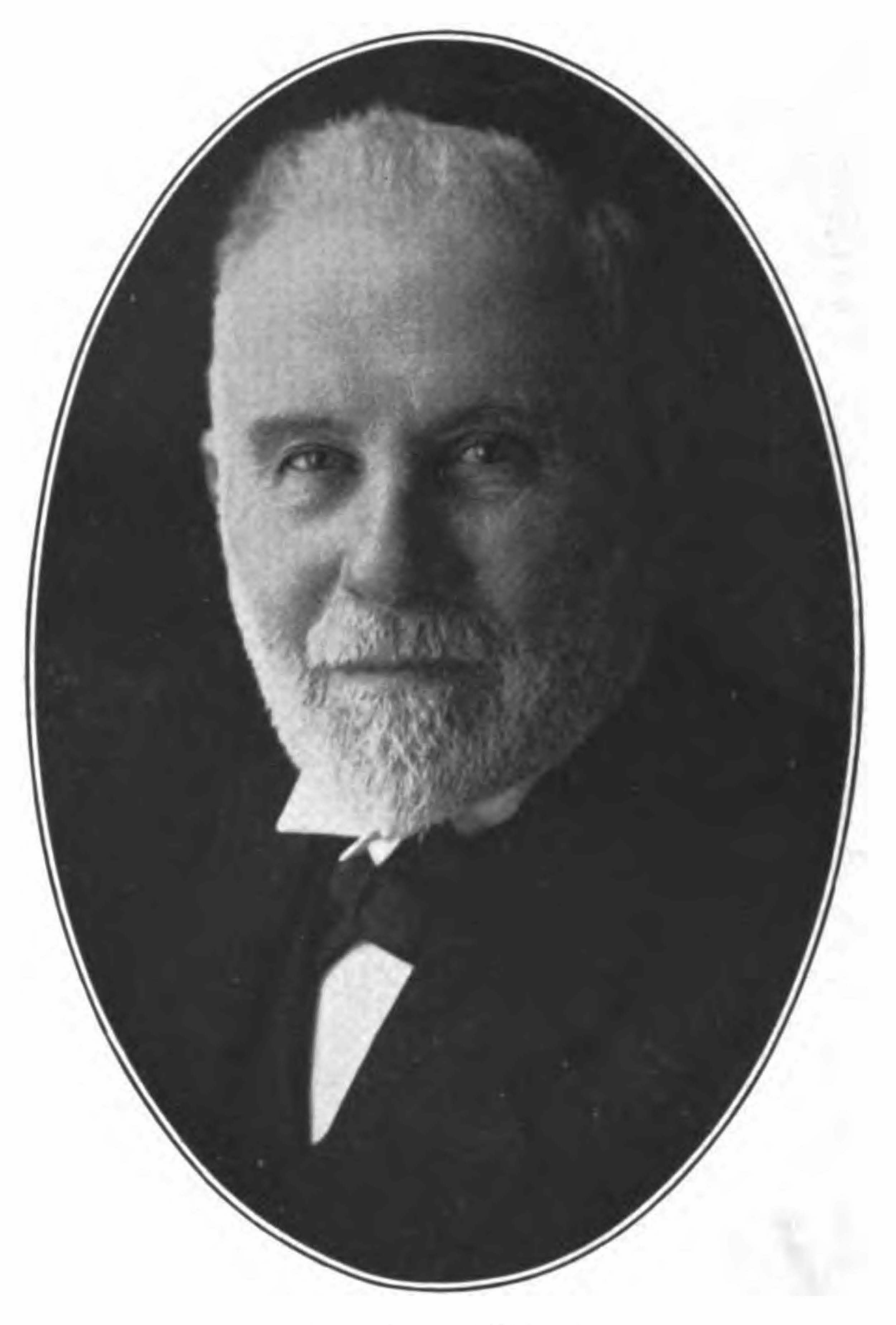
- Charles Henry Owsley, circa 1915
- Born: December 15, 1846; Blaston, Leicestershire, England
- Died: April 9, 1935 (aged 88); Youngstown, Ohio
- Occupation: Architect

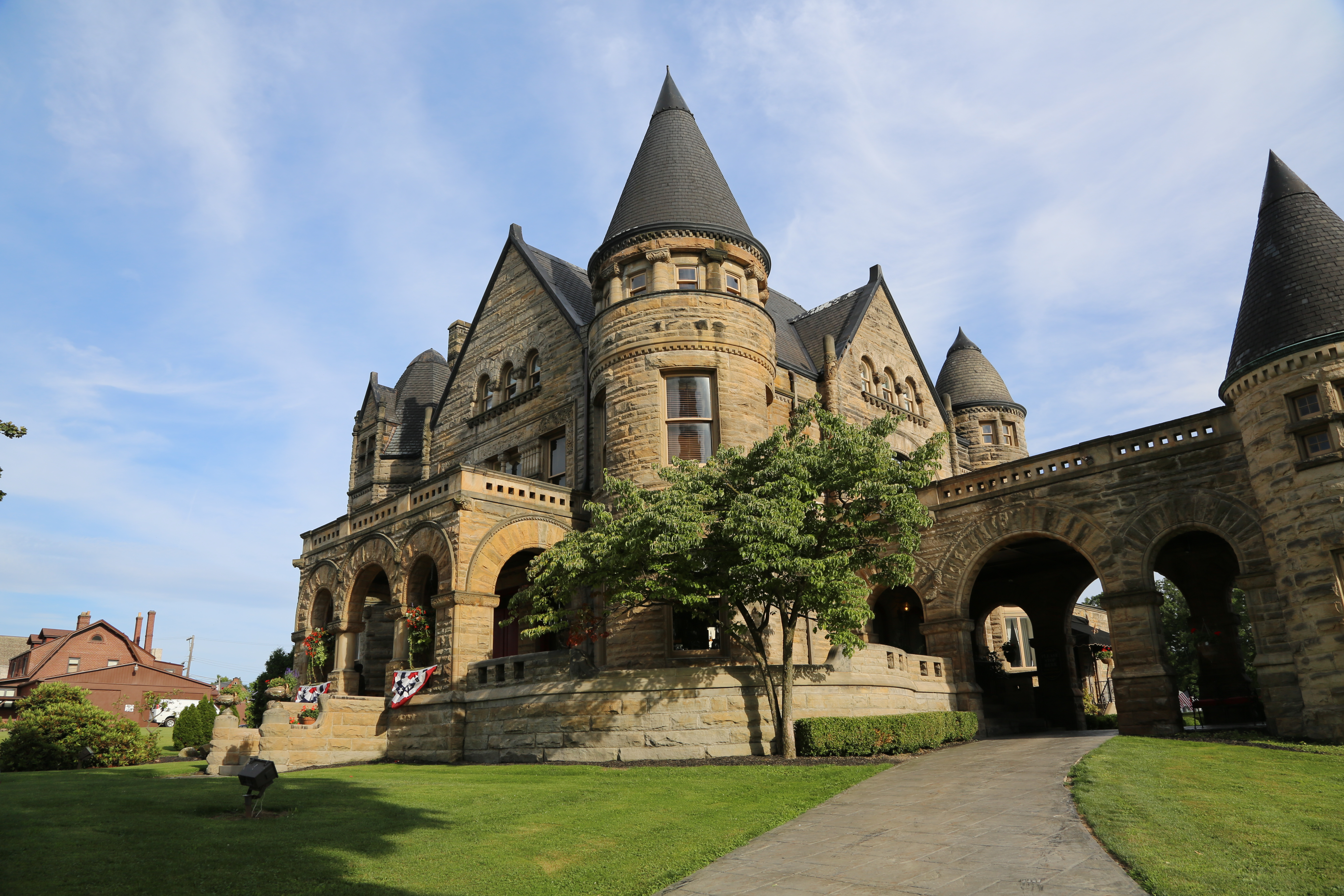
The Buhl mansion in Sharon, completed in 1891.

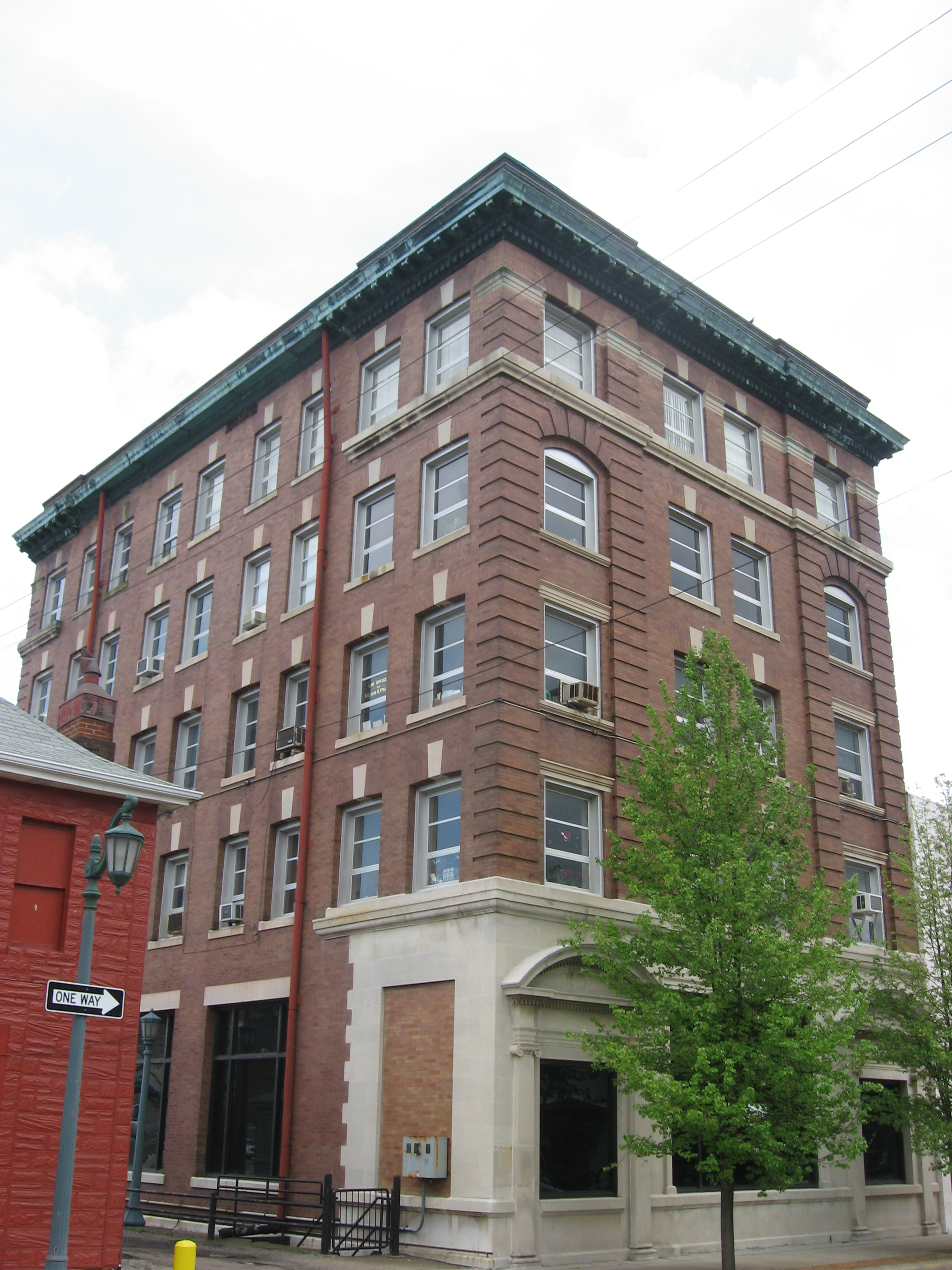
The Potters Building and Savings Company Building in East Liverpool, completed in 1904.

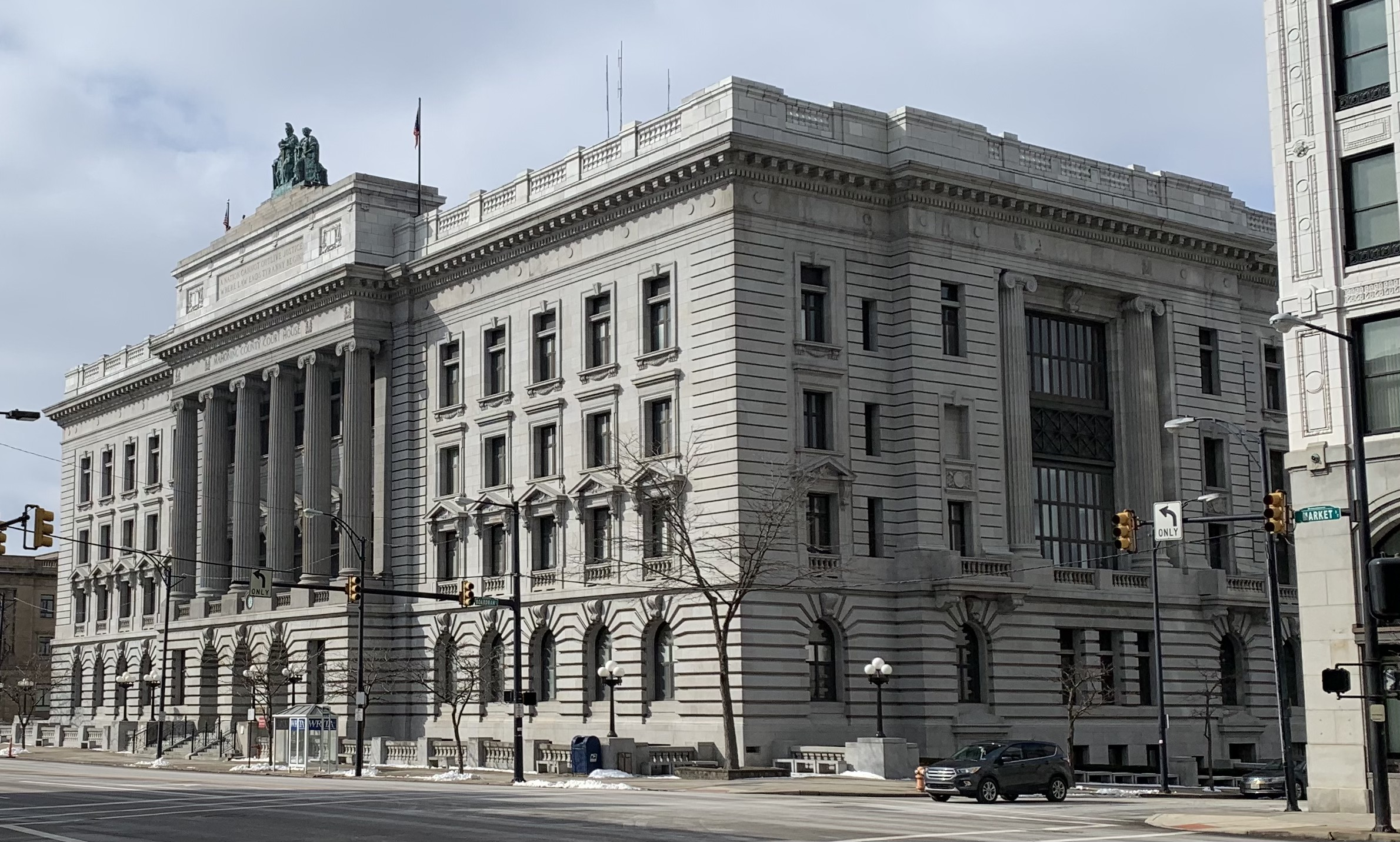
The third Mahoning County Courthouse in Youngstown, completed in 1910.

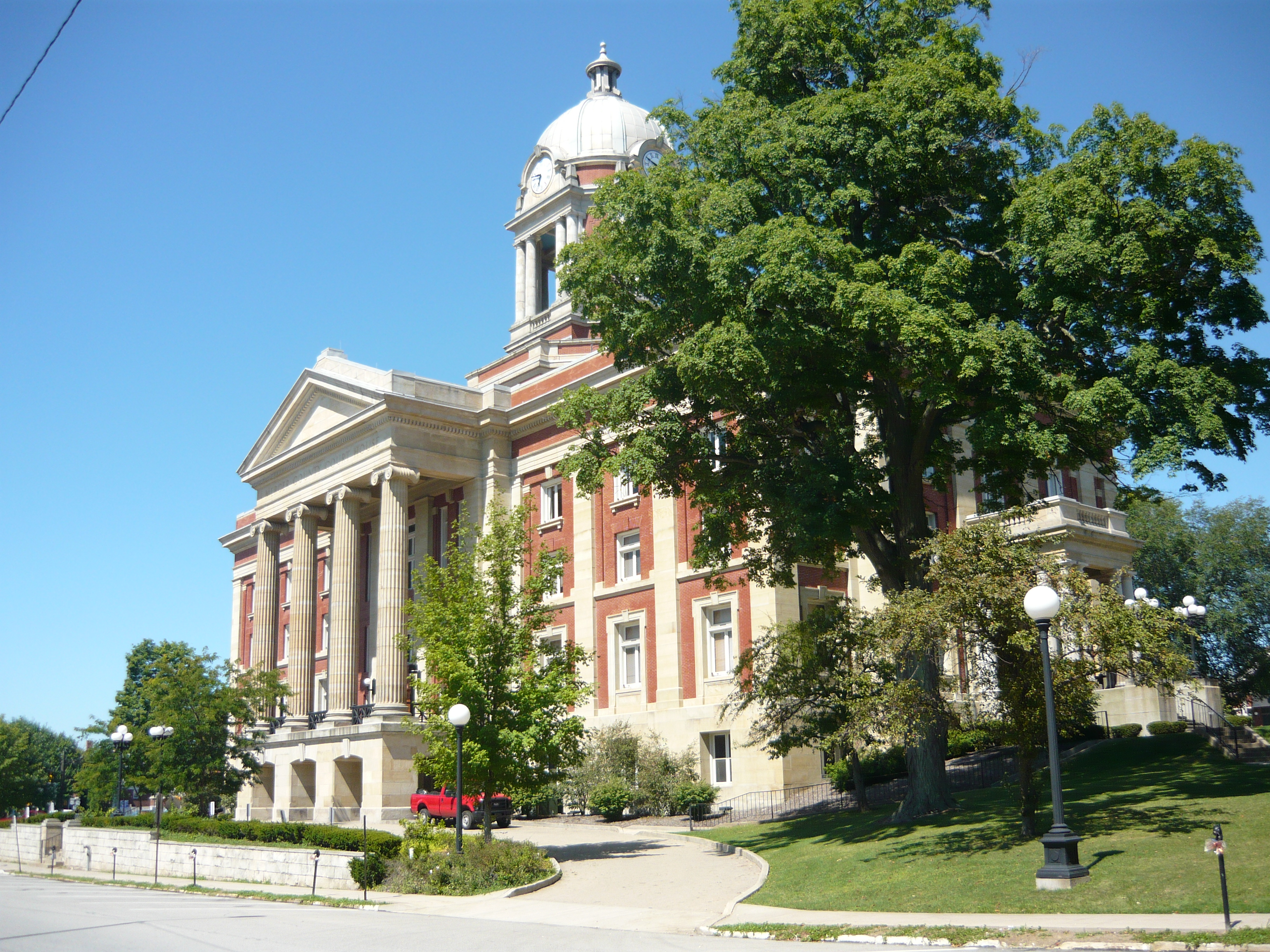
The Mercer County Courthouse in Mercer, completed in 1911.

Charles Henry Owsley FAIA (1846–1935) was an English-born American architect in practice in Youngstown, Ohio, from 1872 until 1912.

== Life and career ==
Charles Henry Owsley was born December 15, 1846, at Blaston Hall in Blaston, Leicestershire in England to William Poyntz Mason Owsley and Henrietta Jane (Farrer) Owsley. He was educated at Allesley Park College, a boys' school, in Coventry, and at the age of 16 intended to pursue a career in the Royal Navy. Owsley had difficulties on a trial voyage and deserted when the ship docked in a Welsh port. His father then arranged for Owsley, then aged 18, to be apprenticed to James Hoskins, an Abergavenny contractor and builder. Owsley later claimed to have worked on projects designed by Matthew Digby Wyatt and George Gilbert Scott during his apprenticeship. He completed his apprenticeship in January 1868. Following his marriage and the death of his father in the same year, Owsley and two of his brothers immigrated to Canada, initially settling in Toronto. In 1869 he moved to Ohio, purchasing land in Weathersfield Township in Trumbull County near Youngstown, and opened an office as an architect in 1872. His first major work was the second Mahoning County Courthouse in Youngstown, completed in 1876, and over the next decade developed a successful regional practice.

In 1887 he formed a partnership with Swiss-born architect Louis Boucherle, who had worked for Owsley for about three years. During the same period Owsley directed his son, Charles Frederick Owsley, towards an architectural career. After an education at the University of Pennsylvania and the École des Beaux-Arts in Paris, the younger Owsley joined his father's office in 1905. In 1908 they began construction of the third Mahoning County Courthouse, replacing Owsley's courthouse of 1876. The new building reflected the younger Owsley's Beaux-Arts training, and he became a partner in the expanded firm of Owsley, Boucherle & Owsley in 1909. The new courthouse, completed in 1910, was Owsley's last major project as a principal architect. Boucherle retired from the partnership in 1911, followed by the elder Owsley in 1912. His son continued the office, but Owsley stayed active. He worked in his son's office, and when the firm was incorporated in 1920 as the Owsley Company, he became vice president. He retired fully c. 1926.

Owsley joined the Western Association of Architects in 1884, and became a Fellow of the American Institute of Architects in 1889 when the two organizations merged.

The majority of Owsley's work was in the Mahoning Valley area of Northeast Ohio and Western Pennsylvania, and several of his significant buildings remain in Youngstown, Ohio, Sharon, Pennsylvania, and Salem, Ohio.

== Personal life and death ==
Owsley was married in 1868 in Abergavenny to Mary Jane Williams. They had five children, including Charles Frederick Owsley (1880–1953). He was a parishioner of the First Presbyterian Church and a member of the Elks and the Masons. He died August 25, 1935, at home in Youngstown.

== Architectural works ==
=== Works by Charles H. Owsley, before 1912 ===
- Mahoning County Courthouse, Wick Ave and Wood St, Youngstown, Ohio (1874–76, demolished)
- Montrose B. Magoffin house, 129 S Pitt St, Mercer, Pennsylvania (1884)
- Ashtabula High School, Station Ave and W 44th St, Ashtabula, Ohio (1885, demolished 1954)
- Julian Harmon house, 210 High St NW, Warren, Ohio (1885, demolished 1928)
- Second National Bank Building, Wick Ave and Central Square, Youngstown, Ohio (1886, demolished)
- Middlefield Town Hall (former), 16013 E High St, Middlefield, Ohio (1887)
- Park Hotel, 136 N Park Ave, Warren, Ohio (1887)
- Henry K. Wick house, (Note: A contributing resource to the Wick Park Historic District, NRHP-listed in 1990 and expanded in 2001.) 57 Illinois Ave, Youngstown, Ohio (1888)
- Trumbull County Orphan's Home, 1440 E Market St, Warren, Ohio (1889–90, demolished)
- Frank H. Buhl house, 422 E State St, Sharon, Pennsylvania (1890–91, NRHP 1977)
- Christian H. Buhl Hospital, E Silver St, Sharon, Pennsylvania (1895–96, demolished)
- Memorial Chapel, Riverview Cemetery, East Liverpool, Ohio (1897–99)
- Darke County Infirmary, 5105 County Home Rd, Greenville, Ohio (1897–98, demolished)
- Mahoning County Infirmary, Herbert Rd, Canfield, Ohio (1897–98, demolished)
- Parmalee School, 1320 Belmont Ave, Youngstown, Ohio (1898, demolished)
- Carnegie Public Library, 219 E 4th St, East Liverpool, Ohio (1900–02, NRHP 1980)
- Buhl Community Recreation Center, 28 Pine St, Sharon, Pennsylvania (1901–03)
- Dollar Bank Building, (Note: The tallest building in Youngstown from its completion in 1902 until the completion of the Wick Building in 1910.) 16 Wick Ave, Youngstown, Ohio (1901–02 and 1908, altered)
- Elks Club, Wick Ave and W Wood St, Youngstown, Ohio (1901, demolished)
- Franklin High School, Otter St, Franklin, Pennsylvania (1902–04, demolished)
- First Presbyterian Church, 323 Main St, Greenville, Pennsylvania (1904)
- Potters Building and Savings Company Building, 517–519 E Broadway St, East Liverpool, Ohio (1904, NRHP 1985)
- Richard Brown Memorial United Methodist Church (former), 1205 Elm St, Youngstown, Ohio (1905)
- Charles H. Owsley house, 238 Broadway, Youngstown, Ohio (1906)
- Mahoning County Courthouse, 120 Market St, Youngstown, Ohio (1908–10, NRHP 1976)
- Mercer County Courthouse, 120 S Diamond St, Mercer, Pennsylvania (1909–11, NRHP 1998)
- Reuben McMillan Free Library, 305 Wick Ave, Youngstown, Ohio (1909–10, NRHP 1986)
- South High School (former), 1833 Market St, Youngstown, Ohio (1909–11)

=== Works by Charles F. Owsley, after 1912 ===
- Salem High School (former), (Note: A contributing resource to the Salem Downtown Historic District, NRHP-listed in 1995.) 230 N Lincoln Ave, Salem, Ohio (1916–17)
- G. M. McKelvey Company building, 210–218 W Federal St, Youngstown, Ohio (1917, NRHP 1986, demolished)
- Home Savings and Loan Company Building, 542 E State St, Salem, Ohio (1928)
- First National Bank Building, 315 E State St, Salem, Ohio (1930)
- St. Augustine Episcopal Church, 614 Parmalee Ave, Youngstown, Ohio (1921, demolished 2019)
- Columbiana County Courthouse remodeling, 105 S Market St, Lisbon, Ohio (1934)
- East Liverpool City Hall, 126 W 6th St, East Liverpool, Ohio (1934, NRHP 1985)
