= Frank H. Buhl =

American businessman (1848–1918)

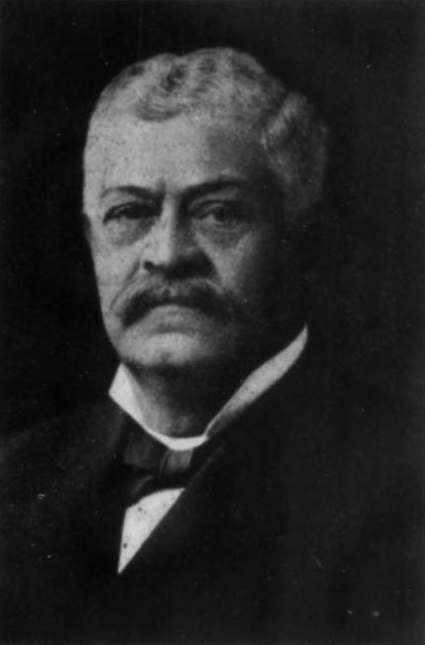
- Buhl in a 1918 publication
- Born: Frank Henry Buhl; August 3, 1848; Detroit, Michigan, U.S.
- Died: June 7, 1918 (aged 69); Sharon, Pennsylvania, U.S.
- Resting place: Oakwood Cemetery
- Education: Yale University
- Occupations: Businessman; philanthropist
- Spouse: Julia Anna Forker (m. 1888)
- Father: Christian H. Buhl

Frank Henry Buhl (August 3, 1848 – June 7, 1918) was an American businessman and philanthropist from Sharon, Pennsylvania. He is the namesake of Buhl, Minnesota, and Buhl, Idaho.

== Early life ==
Frank Henry Buhl was born on August 3, 1848, in Detroit, Michigan, to Christian H. Buhl. His father was the first Republican mayor of Detroit and later the founder of Sharon Iron Works in Sharon, Pennsylvania. He graduated from Yale University.

== Career ==
Buhl worked as a clerk in the offices of Sharon Iron Works. He then became a manager and later bought a controlling interest. In 1896, Buhl Steel Company was organized in Sharon and he was elected the first president. The following year, the open hearth department opened and then the blooming mill followed. In March 1898, it was absorbed by National Steel Corporation and later was a division of Carnegie Steel Company. In 1899, alongside John Stevenson Jr., Buhl built the Sharon Steel Works and in February 1900, the Sharon Steel Company began operation in South Sharon (now Farrell). In 1902, the company was sold to National Steel and Buhl retired. The South Sharon operation would later become the Farrell division of Carnegie Steel. Along with Dan Eagan, Buhl is credited with being one of the first to manufacture steel casting. He did this at the American Steel Castings Company (later the American Steel Foundries) in Sharon.

After retiring, Buhl and Peter L. Kimberly formed the Buhl-Kimberly Corporation and served as its president. The company promoted an irrigation project in Twin Falls, Idaho. The effort helped develop 300,000 acres (120,000 ha) of land. The corporation also engaged in gold, silver and copper mining and building streetcar lines in Manila. He was also president of the Twin Falls (Ida) Land and Water Company.

== Philanthropy ==
After gaining substantial fortune after the sale of his businesses at the turn of the century, Buhl invested in the social fabric of the Shenango Valley. Due to his philanthropy, several sites in the twin communities of Sharon and South Sharon bore his name. Prior to 1916, he donated at least US$1,000,000 to the city of Sharon. In 1916, he donated his 300 acres (120 ha) farm for a park and playground that was named Buhl Park. He built the Buhl Club for about US$350,000 and assisted in the erection of an addition to the Buhl Hospital. He was considered Sharon's "first citizen" and the city honored him with an annual "Buhl Day" in the fall months. He donated to churches and society despite not being affiliated with any church. He donated a three-story building to the Sunshine Society and built the Buhl Armory for the Independent Buhl Rifles.

By his will he gave US$2,000,000 to assist the injured in northern France and Belgium and US$100,000 to accident victims in Sharon.

== Personal life ==
Buhl married Julia Anna Forker on February 8, 1888. They had no children. He lived at the Buhl Mansion on East State Street in Sharon. He visited California in the winters.

In 1909, Buhl's nephew, William Whitla was kidnapped. He reportedly offered a $10,000 reward for the boy's safe return and $20,000 each for his abductors.

Buhl died on June 7, 1918, at his home in Sharon. He was buried in a mausoleum in Oakwood Cemetery.

== Legacy ==
The mining town of Buhl, Minnesota, and the town of Buhl, Idaho, were named after him.
