= Mercer Area School District =

School district in Pennsylvania

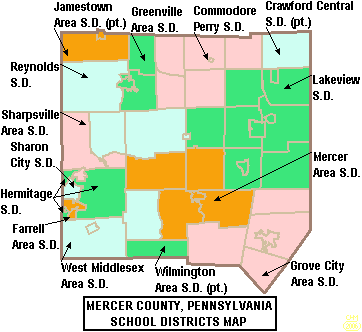

Address
- 545 West Butler St. Mercer, Mercer County, Pennsylvania, 16137-0032; United States

District information
- Type: Public

Students and staff
- District mascot: Mustang
- Colors: Blue and White

Other information
- Website: https://www.mercer.k12.pa.us/

The Mercer Area School District is a small, suburban, public school district serving parts of Mercer County, Pennsylvania, US. Its namesake and central locality is the borough of Mercer; other communities in the district include Jefferson Township, Coolspring Township, Findley Township and East Lackawannock Township. The district encompasses approximately 91 square miles (240 km^{2}). According to 2002 local census data, it serves a resident population of 11,000. By 2010, the district's population declined to 10,745 people. In 2009, the district residents' per capita income was $16,996, while the median family income was $44,043.

Mercer Area School District operates two schools: Mercer Area Elementary School and Mercer Area Middle-High School.

== Extracurriculars ==
Mercer Area School District provides an extensive number of clubs, activities and a sports program.

=== Sports ===
Mercer Area School District funds these sports :

Boys

- Baseball - AA
- Basketball - AA
- Cross Country - A
- Football - A
- Golf - AA
- Soccer - A
- Track and Field - AA
- Wrestling - AA

Girls

- Basketball - AA
- Cross Country - A
- Soccer (Fall) - A
- Softball - AA
- Track and Field - AA
- Volleyball - AA

Middle School Sports

Boys

- Baseball
- Basketball
- Cross Country
- Football
- Soccer
- Track and Field
- Wrestling

Girls

- Basketball
- Cross Country
- Track and Field
- Volleyball

According to PIAA directory July 2013
