= Frank H. Buhl Mansion =

Historic house in Pennsylvania, United States

- U.S. National Register of Historic Places
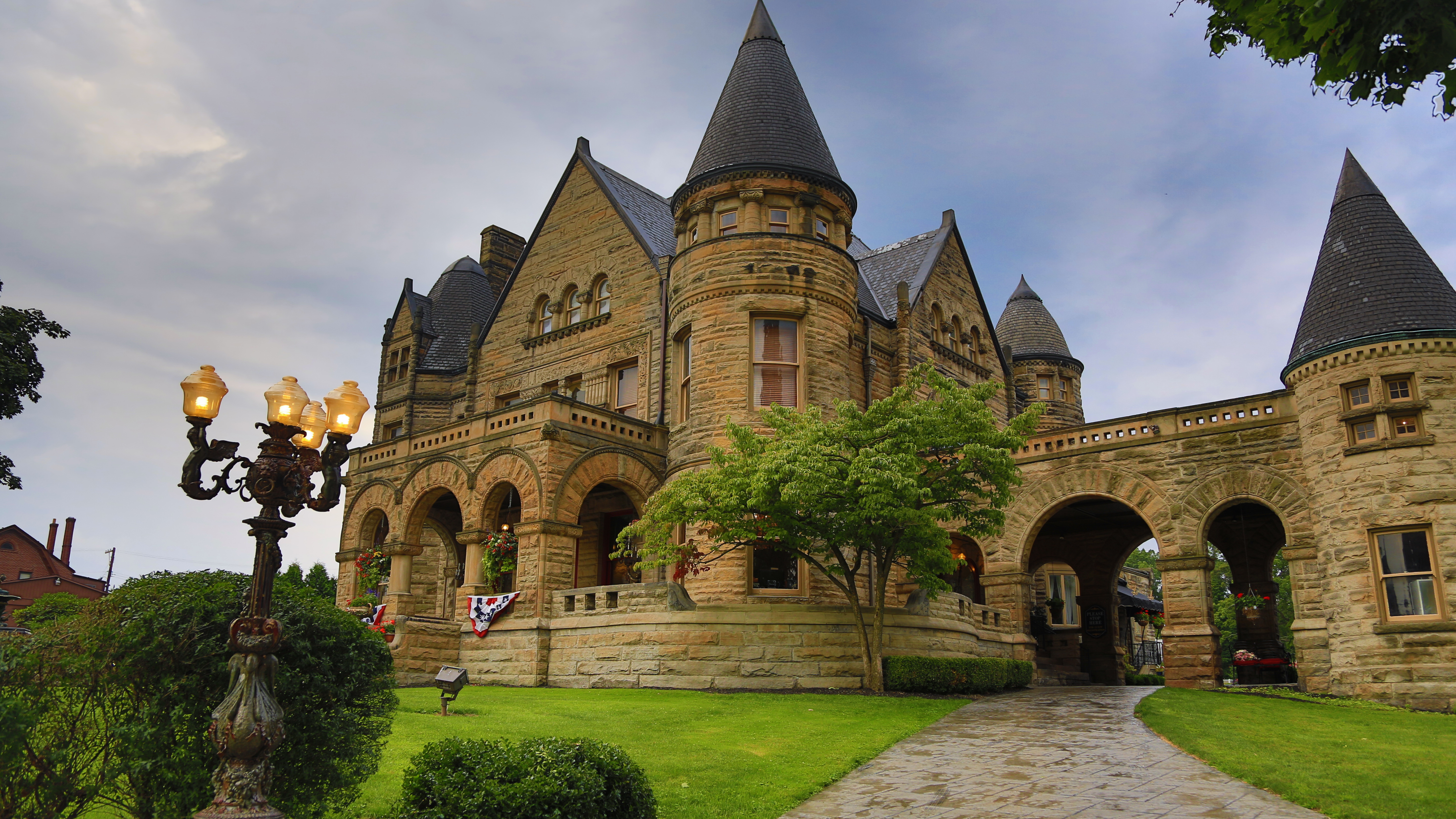
- Front of the house, July 2014

- Location within Pennsylvania Location within the United States
- Location: 422 East State Street, Sharon, Pennsylvania; United States
- Coordinates: 41.2326°N 80.5013°W
- Area: 2 acres (0.81 ha)
- Built: 1891
- Architect: Charles Henry Owsley
- Architectural style: Richardsonian Romanesque
- NRHP reference No.: 77001175
- Added to NRHP: December 2, 1977

Frank H. Buhl Mansion, or Buhl Mansion, is a historic home located in Sharon, Pennsylvania, United States, that is listed on the National Register of Historic Places.

== Description ==
The mansion was built in 1891 for the Buhl family, which owned the Sharon Iron Works. The ashlar sandstone residence has 2 1/2 storeys. Noted Youngstown architect Charles Henry Owsley (1846–1935) designed it in the Richardsonian Romanesque style. The mansion features round arches, steep gable wall dormers, an inset porch with heavy arches, stone finials, and several turrets with copper capped spires. Although the house had been converted to apartments, it was restored. It currently operates as a bed and breakfast and wedding venue.

== History ==
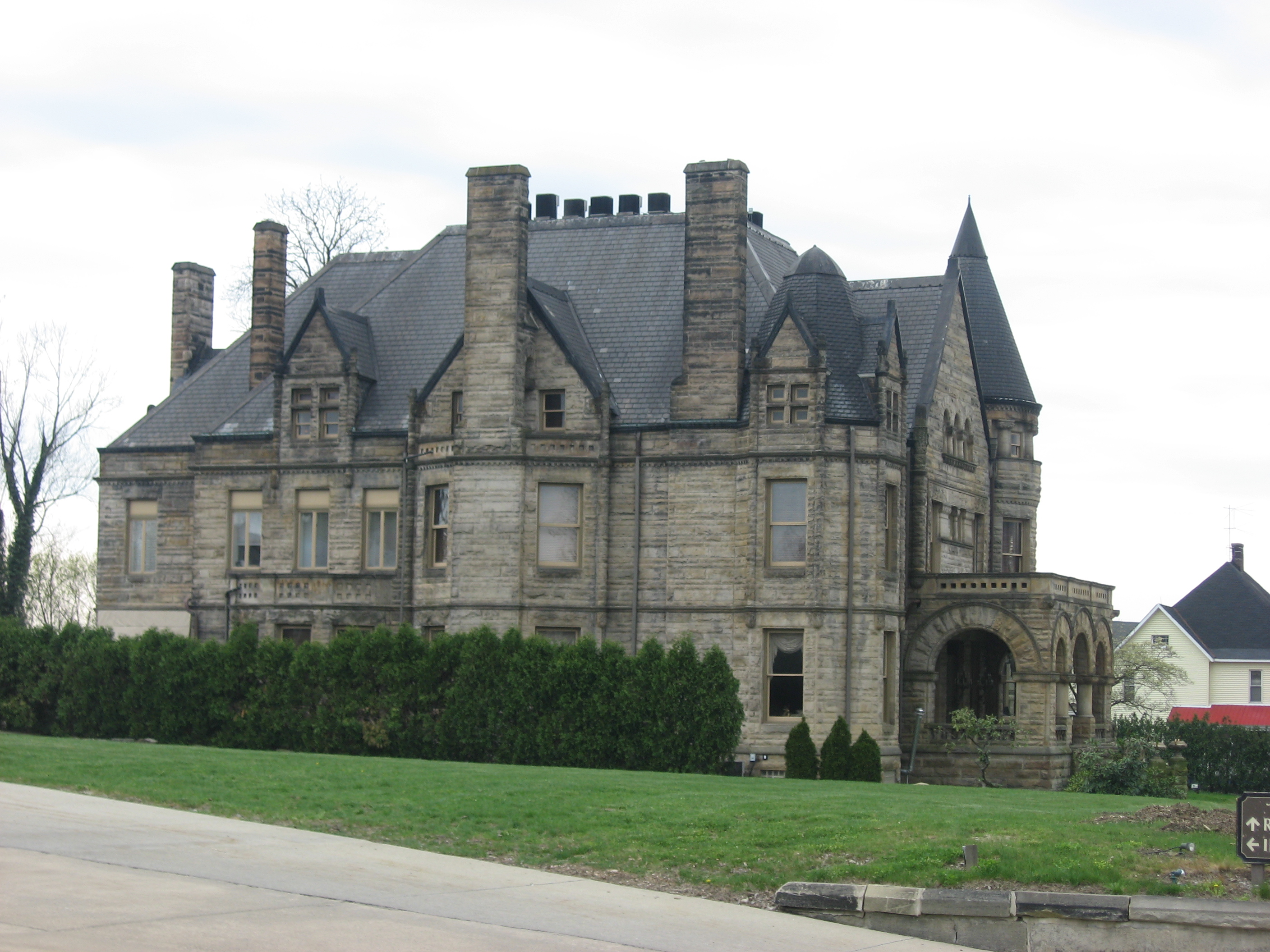
Eastern side and front of the Frank H. Buhl Mansion, 2012

Yale-educated Frank H. Buhl (1848-1918) had returned in 1887 from Detroit, Michigan to help his father run the Iron Works, and in the following year, the Iron Works became Mercer County's largest employer. Buhl founded the Buhl Steel Company in 1896, which three years later merged into the National Steel Co., which was itself eventually merged into the United States Steel Corporation shortly before Buhl's retirement. Buhl became known as the "Father of the Industrial Shenango Valley" and also founded Sharon Steel and Sharon Steel Castings (also merged into U.S. Steel).

Buhl married Julia Forker, daughter of a prominent Sharon family. They had no children and became known for using their fortune to support the surrounding community. Buhl's father had founded the Christian H. Buhl hospital (now the Sharon Regional Hospital). Frank Buhl established the F.H. Buhl club, opened to all Sharon citizens in 1903, and located between this building and the city's downtown. It held music and social rooms, bowling alleys, billiard and games rooms, and a library. It merged with a women's club founded by Julia Buhl, and still serves the community as a recreation center. In 1914, the F.H. Buhl Farm opened as a 300-acre park, complete with an 11-acre lake, beaches, 10 tennis courts, a nine-hole golf course, picnic groves, pavilions, playground and a baseball field.

The mansion was added to the National Register of Historic Places in 1977 and featured in the 1988 film Tiger Warsaw.

== See also ==
- Buhl Farm Golf Course
- National Register of Historic Places listings in Mercer County, Pennsylvania
