= Mercer County Courthouse =

Mercer County Courthouse may refer to:

- Mercer County Courthouse (Illinois), Aledo, Illinois
- Mercer County Courthouse (New Jersey), Trenton, New Jersey
- Mercer County Courthouse (Pennsylvania), Mercer, Pennsylvania
- Mercer County Courthouse (West Virginia), Princeton, West Virginia
