= Buhl, Minnesota =

City in Minnesota, United States

- City
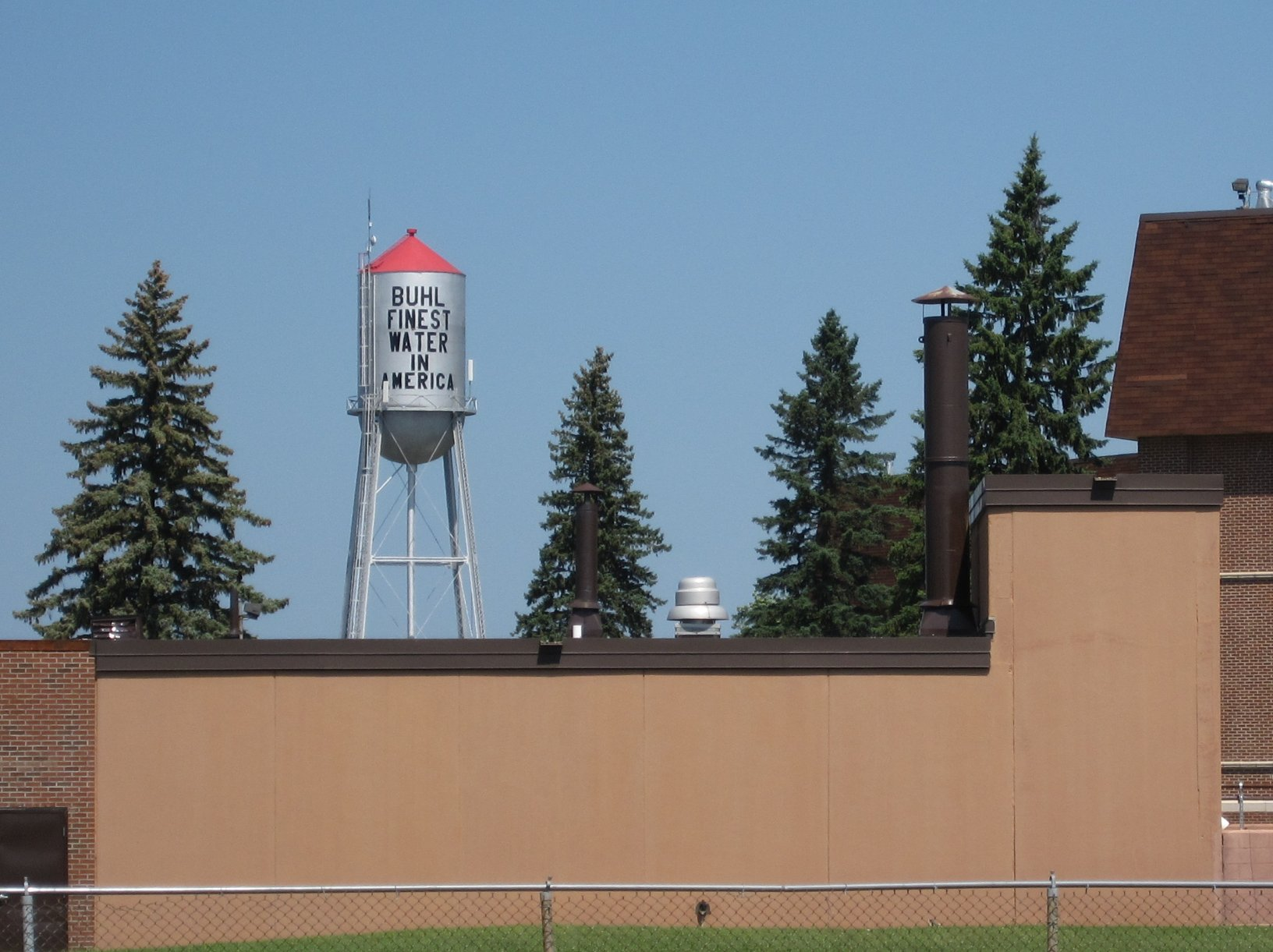
- Buhl Water Tower
- Motto: The Finest Water in America
- Location of the city of Buhl within Saint Louis County, Minnesota
- Coordinates: 47°29′37″N 92°46′25″W
- Country: United States
- State: Minnesota
- County: Saint Louis
- Incorporated: February 25, 1901

Government
  - Mayor: Brandin Carter

Area
  - Total: 3.51 sq mi (9.10 km^{2})
  - Land: 3.31 sq mi (8.57 km^{2})
  - Water: 0.20 sq mi (0.53 km^{2})
- Elevation: 1,522 ft (464 m)

Population (2020)
  - Total: 952
  - Estimate (2022): 949
  - Density: 287.9/sq mi (111.14/km^{2})
- Time zone: UTC-6 (Central (CST))
  - Summer (DST): UTC-5 (CDT)
- ZIP code: 55713
- Area code: 218
- FIPS code: 27-08524
- GNIS feature ID: 0660903
- Sales tax: 7.375%
- Website: cityofbuhlmn.com

Buhl is a city in Saint Louis County, Minnesota, United States. The population was 952 at the 2020 census.

U.S. Highway 169 serves as a main route in the community.

The city's motto is "The Finest Water in America".

== History ==
A post office called Buhl has been in operation since 1900. The city was named for Frank H. Buhl, a businessman in the mining industry. Buhl was incorporated on February 25, 1901.

== Geography ==
According to the United States Census Bureau, the city has an area of 3.56 square miles (9.22 km^{2}); 3.35 square miles (8.68 km^{2}) is land and 0.21 square miles (0.54 km^{2}) is water.

=== Water ===
Buhl is noted for its pure water, supplied by a glacial aquifer 700 feet below the surface encased in 300 feet of solid granite. This is reflected in the city's motto, prominently displayed on the town's water tower.

== Demographics ==
Historical population
Census	Pop.	Note	%±
1910	1,005		—
1920	2,007		99.7%
1930	1,634		−18.6%
1940	1,600		−2.1%
1950	1,462		−8.6%
1960	1,526		4.4%
1970	1,303		−14.6%
1980	1,284		−1.5%
1990	915		−28.7%
2000	983		7.4%
2010	1,000		1.7%
2020	952		−4.8%
2022 (est.)	949		−0.3%
U.S. Decennial Census; 2020 Census

=== 2010 census ===
As of the 2010 census, there were 1,000 people, 430 households, and 228 families living in the city. The population density was 298.5 inhabitants per square mile (115.3/km^{2}). There were 496 housing units at an average density of 148.1 per square mile (57.2/km^{2}). The racial makeup of the city was 93.7% White, 1.7% African American, 2.1% Native American, 0.4% Asian, and 2.1% from two or more races. Hispanic or Latino of any race were 0.3% of the population.

There were 430 households, of which 25.1% had children under the age of 18 living with them, 39.8% were married couples living together, 8.1% had a female householder with no husband present, 5.1% had a male householder with no wife present, and 47.0% were non-families. 40.2% of all households were made up of individuals, and 18.6% had someone living alone who was 65 years of age or older. The average household size was 2.11 and the average family size was 2.88.

The median age in the city was 42 years. 22.7% of residents were under the age of 18; 6.2% were between the ages of 18 and 24; 24.1% were from 25 to 44; 26.1% were from 45 to 64; and 20.9% were 65 years of age or older. The gender makeup of the city was 52.8% male and 47.2% female.

=== 2000 census ===
As of the 2000 census, there were 983 people, 405 households, and 240 families living in the city. The population density was 299.0 inhabitants per square mile (115.4/km^{2}). There were 432 housing units at an average density of 131.4 per square mile (50.7/km^{2}). The racial makeup of the city was 94.91% White, 0.71% African American, 2.75% Native American, 0.20% Asian, 0.31% from other races, and 1.12% from two or more races. Hispanic or Latino of any race were 0.51% of the population. 20.5% were of Finnish, 15.1% German, 10.7% Italian, 6.8% English and 5.8% Norwegian ancestry.

There were 405 households, out of which 25.4% had children under the age of 18 living with them, 46.7% were married couples living together, 8.9% had a female householder with no husband present, and 40.5% were non-families. 35.1% of all households were made up of individuals, and 18.3% had someone living alone who was 65 years of age or older. The average household size was 2.21 and the average family size was 2.87.

In the city, the population was spread out, with 25.9% under the age of 18, 7.9% from 18 to 24, 24.1% from 25 to 44, 22.4% from 45 to 64, and 19.6% who were 65 years of age or older. The median age was 39 years. For every 100 females, there were 118.4 males. For every 100 females age 18 and over, there were 101.1 males.

The median income for a household in the city was $31,574, and the median income for a family was $34,464. Males had a median income of $35,938 versus $21,538 for females. The per capita income for the city was $14,828. About 7.2% of families and 13.2% of the population were below the poverty line, including 21.9% of those under age 18 and 11.0% of those age 65 or over.

== Politics ==
Presidential election results

2020 Precinct Results Spreadsheet2016 Precinct Results Spreadsheet2012 Precinct Results Spreadsheet2008 Precinct Results Spreadsheet2004 Precinct Results Spreadsheet2000 Precinct Results Spreadsheet
Year	Republican	Democratic	Third parties
2020	55.1% 305	41.9% 232	3.0% 17
2016	50.0% 265	40.5% 214	9.5% 50
2012	32.1% 163	63.2% 321	4.7% 24
2008	29.5% 159	67.2% 362	3.3% 18
2004	29.7% 167	68.7% 387	1.6% 9
2000	24.5% 141	64.0% 368	11.5% 66

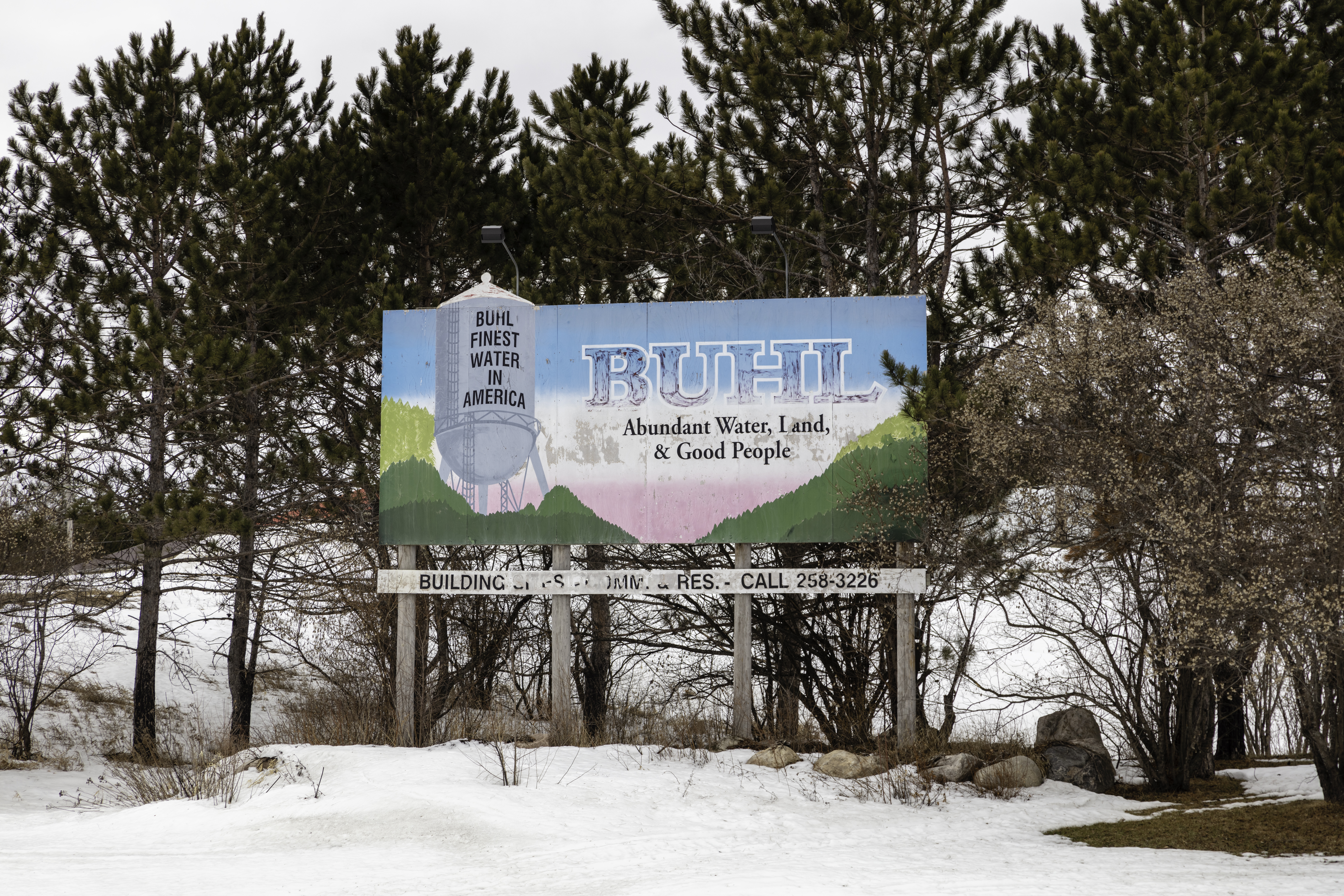
Buhl Abundant Water, Land & Good People sign in Buhl, Minnesota
