= Big Bend Historical Area =

Historic district in Pennsylvania, United States

- U.S. National Register of Historic Places
- U.S. Historic district
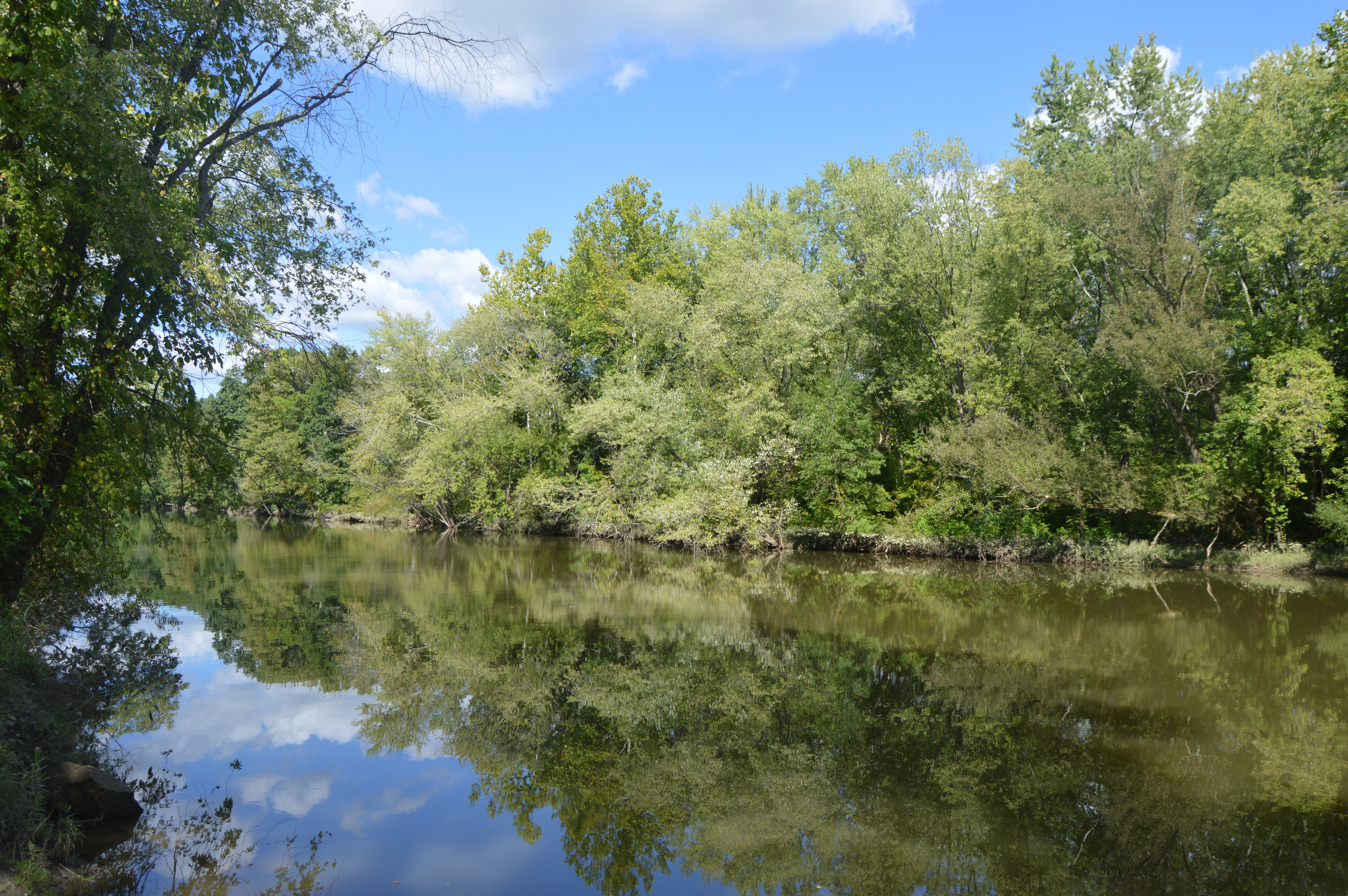
- Along the river at the site of Big Bend

- Location within Pennsylvania Location within the United States
- Location: 6 miles (9.7 km) northwest of Mercer on the Shenango River, Jefferson Township, Pennsylvania
- Coordinates: 41°17′33″N 80°19′36″W
- Area: 204 acres (83 ha)
- Built: 1846
- NRHP reference No.: 75001654
- Added to NRHP: April 21, 1975

Big Bend Historical Area is a national historic district located at Jefferson Township, Mercer County, Pennsylvania. The district includes 4 contributing sites and 2 contributing structures in three areas on the Shenango River. It is the site of the early 19th century Village of Big Bend, abandoned prior to 1940. It includes the site of the Big Bend Iron Furnace (1846), and the remains of the Shenango Division of the Erie Extension Canal towpath, loading bay, and road. Also in the district is the site of the Shenango House Hotel (c. 1830), remains of Dam Number 2, lockkeeper's house, and canal lock.

It was added to the National Register of Historic Places in 1975.
