= Mercer Area Middle-High School =

Coordinates: 41.22522°N 80.24620°W

Location
- 545 W. Butler Street; Mercer, Pennsylvania 16137; United States

Information
- Type: Public, Middle, Secondary
- School district: Mercer Area School District
- Principal: Eric Mausser
- Grades: 7–12
- Campus: Rural
- Colors: Navy, royal blue, and white
- Athletics conference: District 10 Region 1 Conference
- Nickname: Mustangs
- Website: www.mercer.k12.pa.us

Mercer Area High School is a high school located in Mercer, Pennsylvania, United States. The school's colors are navy blue and white. The school mascot is the Mercer Mustang.

== Notable alumni ==
- Gary Peters, professional baseball player, Boston Red Sox and Chicago White Sox
- Trent Reznor, lead singer and songwriter, Nine Inch Nails
