= St Giles' Church, Blaston =

Church in Blaston, Leicestershire

Coordinates: 52°33′03″N 0°49′03″W

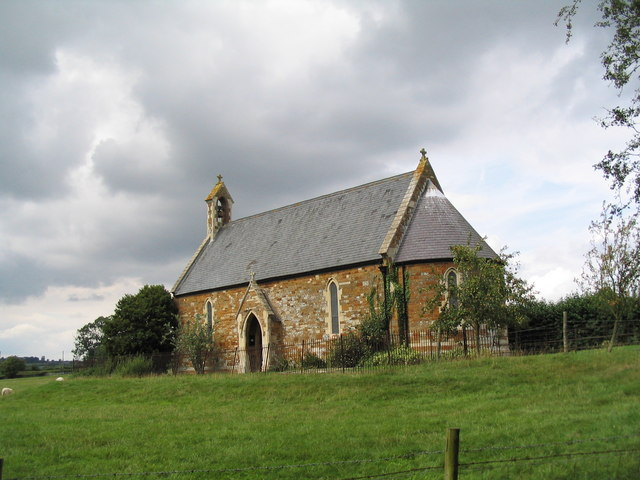
- Denomination: Church of England

History
- Dedication: St Giles

Administration
- Diocese: Leicester
- Archdeaconry: Leicester
- Parish: Blaston, Leicestershire

Clergy
- Rector: Stephen Bishop

St Giles' Church is a church in Blaston, Leicestershire. It is a Grade II listed building.

== History ==
The current church was built in 1878, to the design of George Edmund Street, replacing an earlier church. It consists of a nave, chancel, bell-cote containing 1 bell and a south porch. There are 2 fonts, one of them dates to the time of the building of the church and the other one is earlier.

The nave has a painting of St Jerome on the north wall. It was painted by Decio Vilares in 1877. The Brazilian flag was also designed by a Décio Villares but, despite different spellings, it is unknown whether this is the same person. The nave's screens have 2 segments of stained glass.
