= Carnegie Public Library (East Liverpool, Ohio) =

Public library in East Liverpool, Ohio, US

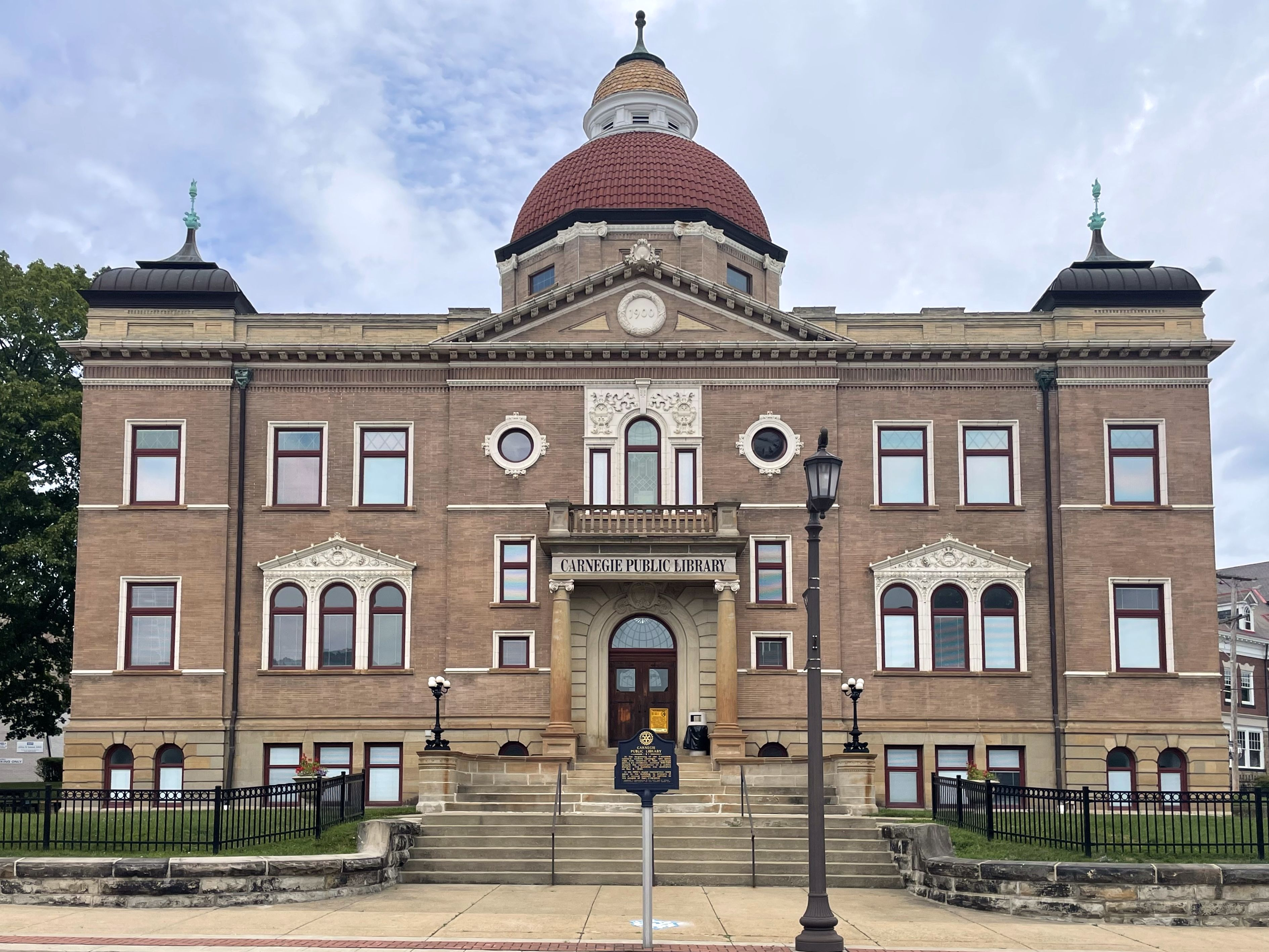
- Location: East Liverpool, Ohio, United States
- Established: May 8, 1902
- Architect: Charles Henry Owsley

Collection
- Size: 77414

Access and use
- Circulation: 131,634
- Population served: 12,396

Other information
- Director: Ms. Melissa Percic
- Website: www.carnegie.lib.oh.us
- Carnegie Public Library
- U.S. National Register of Historic Places
- Location within Ohio Location within the United States
- Location: 219 E. 4th St., East Liverpool, Ohio
- Coordinates: 40°37′4″N 80°34′41″W
- Area: less than one acre
- Built: 1900
- Architect: Charles Henry Owsley
- Architectural style: Colonial Revival, Late 19th And 20th Century Revivals, Second Renaissance Revival
- NRHP reference No.: 80002963
- Added to NRHP: March 11, 1980

The Carnegie Public Library in East Liverpool, Ohio, is a public library located at 219 East Fourth Street. The construction of the library, which opened in 1902, was funded by industrialist and philanthropist Andrew Carnegie, whose uncle lived in East Liverpool. Along with the Steubenville, Ohio library, it was the first library in Ohio funded by Carnegie. It was listed on the National Register of Historic Places in March 1980.

== Background ==
In 1899 T.Y. Travis and M.E. Miskall contacted Andrew Carnegie asking him for a donation of a library for East Liverpool. Carnegie pledged $50,000 for the building of the library on the stipulation that the city would provide land and $3,000 a year for maintenance. In August 1899 the Bradshaw Farm property was purchased by a group of citizens of East Liverpool and held in trust until the city could purchase it. Construction of the library began in 1900. It was built with Roman mottled buff-brown brick trimmed with white tile. The lobby is of ceramic mosaic, the wainscoting of Italian marble and the solid brass hardware. Charles Henry Owsley, a British architect who had immigrated to Youngstown, Ohio, designed the building.

As the library neared completion donations of good, worthwhile books were requested. The first librarian hired to run the library was Gertrude A. Baker of Mt. Vernon, Ohio.

On May 8, 1902, the library was dedicated and officially opened to the public. At this time the 2,505 volumes from the other city library were transferred to the Carnegie Library.

A year after the opening, the librarian reported that there were 5,992 volumes and 2,081 members. In the first year, according to the librarian, the library was so popular with patrons that it loaned more books each month than were actually in the library.

== Early years ==
Until 1931, the library experienced financial difficulties. In that year, however, the library became eligible for county funds. Since then the library has operated through state and county funds.

In 1907 the local historical society established a museum in the West Room of the second floor and then later expanded to include pottery displays in the East Room displaying works from over 50 local potteries. The museum and pottery displays remained in the library until the Museum of Ceramics was opened in the 1970s.

The upper East Room of the library was used by the Red Cross for project work such as rolling bandages during World War I.

The library possessed 25,000 volumes by 1940, but none were catalogued. Kenneth Emerick was hired in 1950 to perform the cataloguing duties when the library holdings had reached 36,000 volumes. He worked until 1955 when the work was taken over by Beatrice Davidson. The library collection was increasing at a rate of approximately 4,000 volumes per year. By the mid-1960s there were 75,000 volumes, all catalogued. By 1975, the library held 120,000 volumes.

The library took part in the Ohio Victory Book Campaign during World War II. The goal of the campaign was to provide good reading material to the servicemen. In six weeks more than 3,000 books were collected.

In 1946 a summer reading program for children was initiated.

In 1956 the library received a donation of 250 microfilms of the local newspaper dating back to 1885.

== Renovations ==
A number of renovation projects took place during the 1950s and early 1960s. Over 12 years the cost was approximately $75,000. As part of the renovations, the custodian's home was removed and replaced by a Trustee Meeting Room (the Board Room), and a historical display area. A stack room was created in an excavated portion of the basement. New shelving was installed for the growing collection and furniture for the reading room was purchased. A new circulation desk and circulation system were also installed. In 1961 the rear entrance was remodeled. The administrative offices were moved to the basement replacing the area previously occupied by the historical displays. A teen area was created on the main floor where the offices had been.

The library also underwent renovations in the 1990s. In order to comply with the Americans with Disabilities Act an elevator and handicap accessibility were installed. Shelving was replaced and the nonfiction and Reference collections were moved to vacant rooms on the second floor. All the furniture from the renovations of the 1950s was replaced. Oak tables were refinished and new lighting was installed throughout the library. Additionally, a new circulation desk and computerized circulation and catalogue system were installed. Approximately $1,300,000 were spent over a three-year span for renovations.

== See also ==
- Carnegie Public Library, located in Huntington, West Virginia
