= Wendell August Forge =

- U.S. National Register of Historic Places
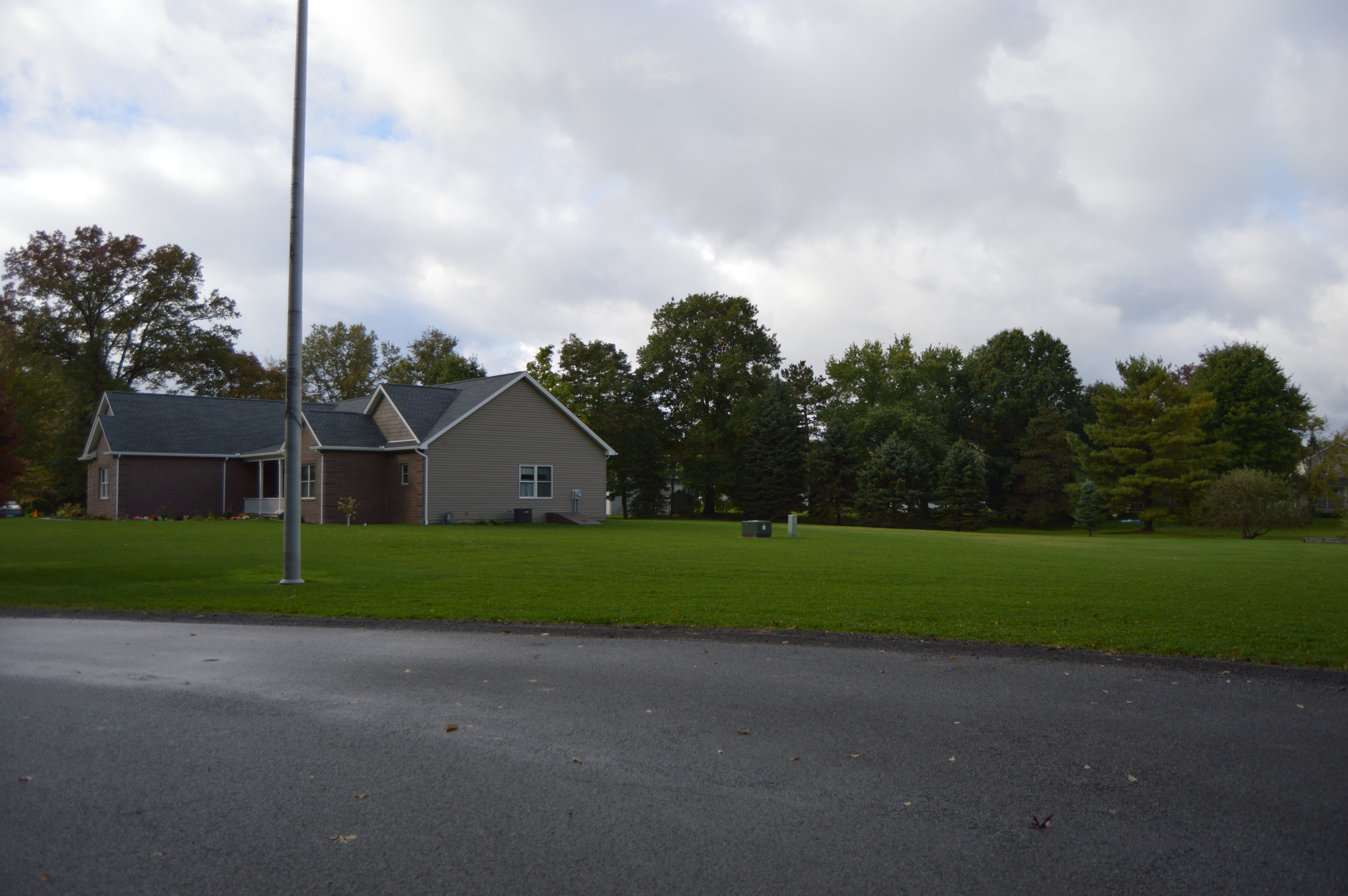
- Wendell August Forge site, October 2014

- Location within Pennsylvania Location within the United States
- Location: 620 Madison St., Grove City, Pennsylvania
- Coordinates: 41°9′58″N 80°4′34″W
- Area: 1.8 acres (0.73 ha)
- Built: 1932
- NRHP reference No.: 96001192
- Added to NRHP: November 7, 1996

Wendell August Forge
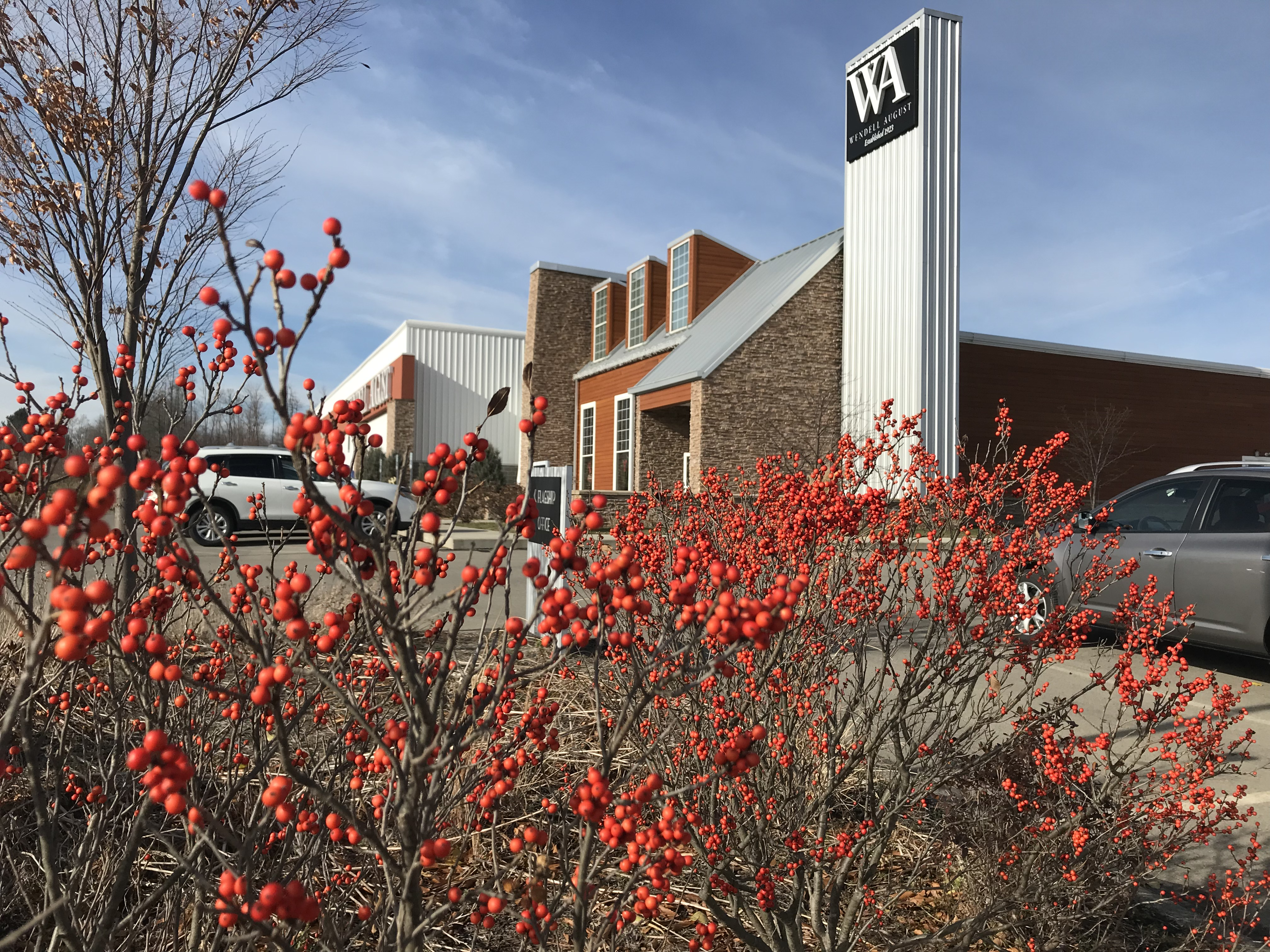
- Wendell August flagship store
- Headquarters: 2074 Leesburg Grove City Rd., Mercer, Pennsylvania

Wendell August Forge is America's oldest and largest such forge still in existence in the United States. The original facility was a historic landmark in Mercer County, Pennsylvania. The company operates retail stores in Grove City, and Berlin, Ohio, and Wilmington, North Carolina; the forge and the stores are well-known tourist destinations. Wendell August was the first to use the repoussé process of manufacture, and has operated near Grove City since 1932. It produces a variety of merchandise, including Americana, such as bowls, figurines and ornaments, as well as commemorative items.

First founded by coal miner Wendell McMinn August in 1923 in Brockway, Pennsylvania, it moved to Grove City almost a decade later. When that facility was built in 1932, the forge was a simple one-story rectangular building measuring approximately 60 feet (18 m) by 160 feet (49 m); its frame was steel, constructed on a foundation of poured concrete. That property was located in a primarily residential neighborhood.

== 2010 fire ==
The historic facility was destroyed by a fire on March 6, 2010 started by a spark from an electric ventilation fan. The fire moved rapidly throughout the structure, pressing almost two dozen local firefighters into service.

While the building itself was a total loss, firefighters knew where the dies that were most crucial to the forge's regular operation were held and worked to keep flames away from that part of the building, and were able to save the majority of them.

Prior to the fire, Wendell August Forge had just completed a deal with the Pittsburgh Penguins, which had been the biggest purchase in the forge's history. The deal was to produce souvenir tickets for the NHL team's final home game at Mellon Arena before it would be demolished to make way for its successor, CONSOL Energy Center. Team owner Mario Lemieux offered to advance some of the money to the forge prior to the order's completion after being assured that the order would be filled without a problem.

The forge was operating from temporary locations within five days with little disruption in service. For the next three years, factory and office operations were located at the old Cooper-Bessemer plant in Grove City with a temporary retail outlet at the nearby Slovak Folk Crafts.

Wendell August Forge was grandfathered under subsequent zoning changes made in the borough of Grove City since it first opened. It could only be rebuilt on the existing lot in Grove City if it complied with the current zoning regulations, which was not feasible. With the help of a state grant of $4 million secured by then-state Senator Don White, the forge relocated to a new location in a substantially larger facility and increased its workforce from 70 to 120.

On October 9, 2013, Wendell August opened its new flagship store, factory and headquarters at 2074 Leesburg-Grove City Rd, 1/2 mile west of the Grove City Premium Outlets in Springfield Township, Mercer County, Pennsylvania. The new 52,000 square foot facility includes a history center and offers tours of the factory.

The company pioneered the production of hammered aluminum giftware, which it first produced in 1930.
