= Potters Savings and Loan =

- U.S. National Register of Historic Places
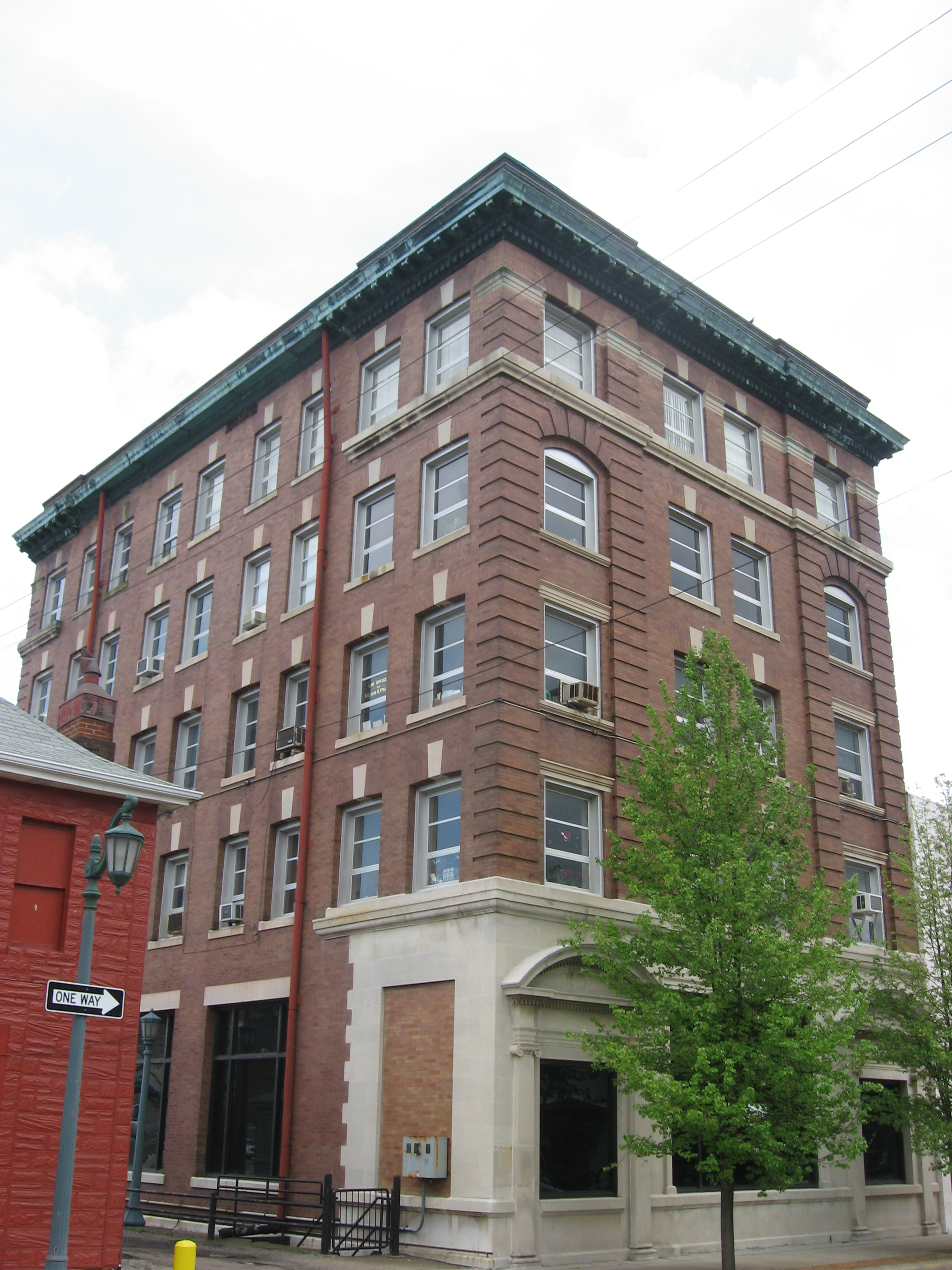

- Location within Ohio Location within the United States
- Location: Washington and Broadway, East Liverpool, Ohio
- Coordinates: 40°37′8″N 80°34′41″W
- Area: less than one acre
- Built: 1904
- Architect: Owsley & Boucherle
- Architectural style: Late 19th and 20th Century Revivals, Second Renaissance Revival
- MPS: East Liverpool Central Business District MRA
- NRHP reference No.: 85003517
- Added to NRHP: November 14, 1985

The Potters Savings and Loan Company (originally known as Potters Building and Savings Co.) was a savings and loan association in East Liverpool, Ohio. The association was organized by John Purinton and incorporated on February 11, 1889.

The Potters Building and Savings Company purchased land on Washington Street in East Liverpool in 1903. The savings and loan building was built in 1904. The architects for the project were Owsley & Boucherle of Youngstown, Ohio. The building was added to the National Register of Historic Places on November 14, 1985.
