= Buhl Farm Golf Course =

Public golf course in Pennsylvania, US

Buhl Farm Golf Course & Driving Range
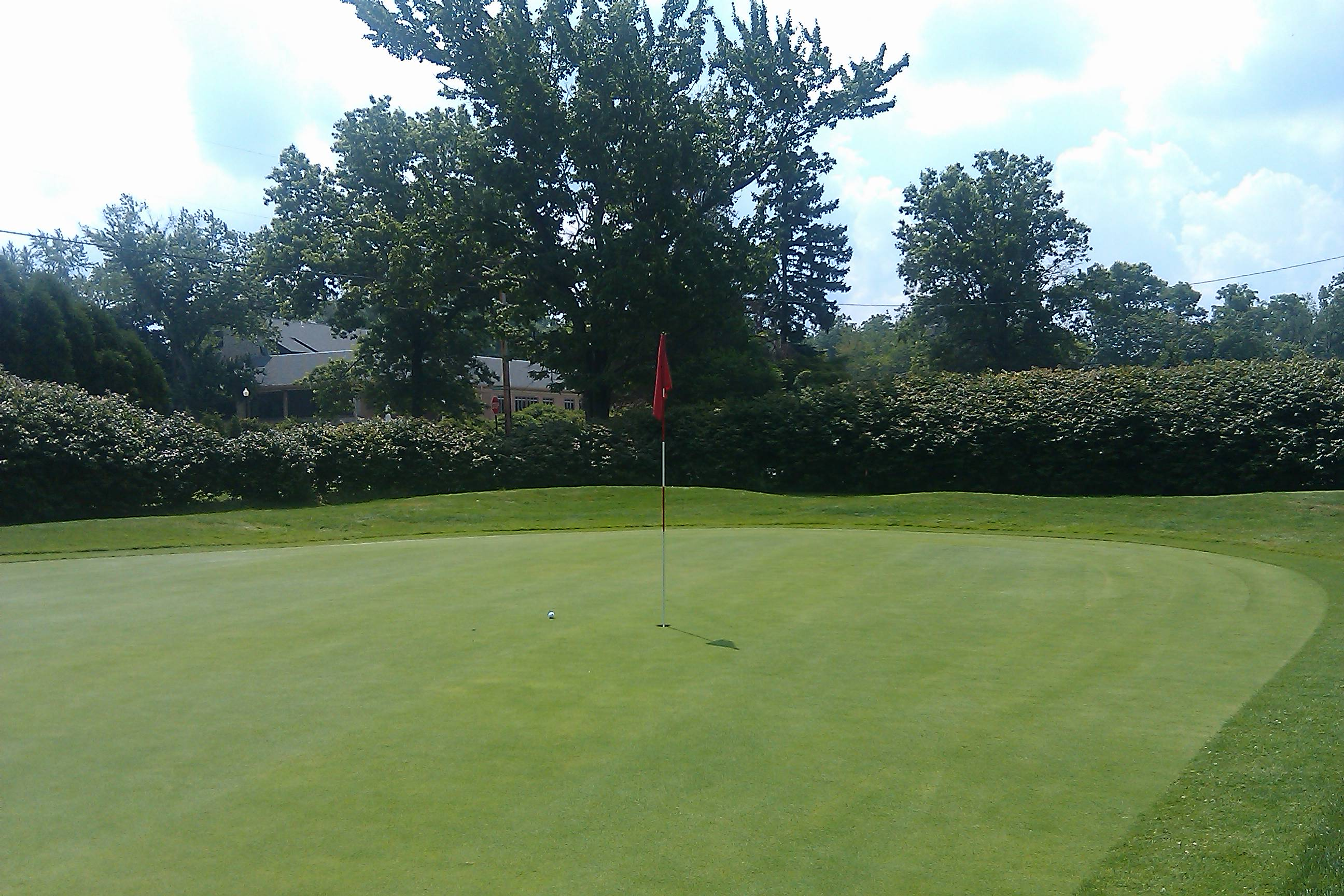
- Buhl Farm Park Golf Course - Hole #1

- Location within Pennsylvania
- 41.25066°N 80.49041°W

Club information
- Location: Hermitage, Pennsylvania
- Established: 1914
- Type: Public
- Owner: Buhl Farm Park
- Total holes: 9
- Website: Buhl Farm Golf Course
- Par: 34
- Length: 2,378 yards

Buhl Farm Golf Course, formerly known as Buhland Golf Course, located in Hermitage, Pennsylvania, is currently the only known free public golf course in the United States. The 9-hole course is open from mid-April to November between 8 a.m. to sundown (closing times vary on season, so call ahead). The course is known for its flat greens, high rough and little room between each hole. It is also known for its easy layout including straight and wide fairways. The course is also known for its one artificial turf tee box, and eight other natural tee boxes. The course also includes a driving range and a First Tee center. It is run by the Buhl Farm Trust and generous donations from the public. The free course is called "Dum Dum" by the locals. It also has a children's golf program in the summer.

== See also ==
- Buhl Mansion

== Notes ==
^1Mesa View Public Golf Course in Bagdad, Arizona was long considered the exception to Buhl farms as another United States public golf course that was free, however as of August 6th, 2022, Mesa View Public Golf Course in Bagdad Arizona is no longer free except for city residents who carry their own equipment while walking or who provide and use their own push cart. Non-city residents of the course are charged a Green Fee for play. All players must have a registered tee time with the Pro Shop. Holes 9, Type: Public, Style: Executive, Par: 30, Length: 1671 yards, Slope: 89, Rating: 29.5
