= Bridge in French Creek Township =

- U.S. National Register of Historic Places
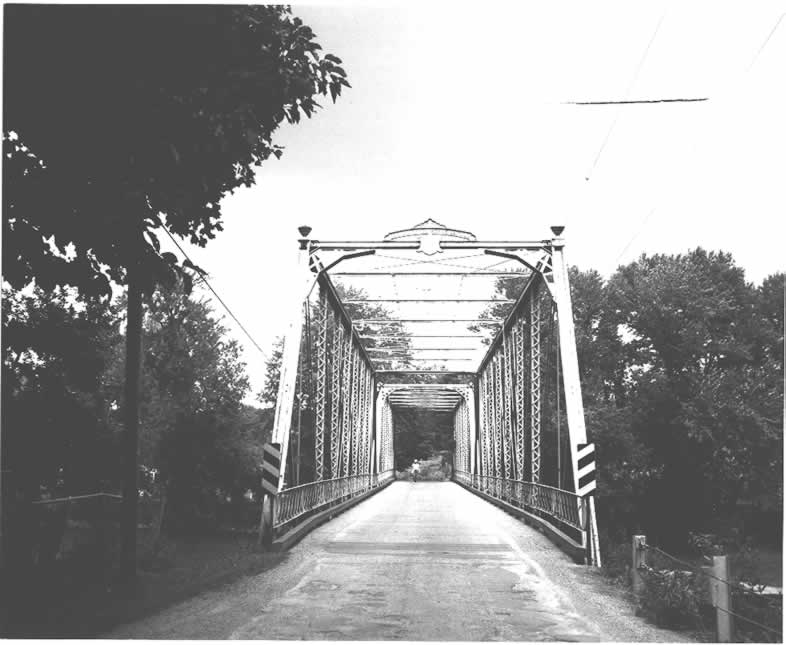
- Bridge in French Creek Township, 1982

- Location within Pennsylvania Location within the United States
- Location: Legislative Route 43074 over French Creek, French Creek Township, Pennsylvania
- Coordinates: 41°28′17″N 80°1′7″W
- Area: less than one acre
- Built: 1888
- Built by: Columbia Bridge Works
- Architectural style: Pratt through truss
- MPS: Highway Bridges Owned by the Commonwealth of Pennsylvania, Department of Transportation TR
- NRHP reference No.: 88000862
- Added to NRHP: June 22, 1988

Bridge in French Creek Township is a historic multi-span steel Pratt truss bridge located near the village of Carlton, Pennsylvania in French Creek Township, Mercer County, Pennsylvania. It was built in 1888 by the Columbia Bridge Works, and is a 277-foot-long (84 m) bridge with two spans. It crosses French Creek.

During the summer of 2014 the bridge was removed, disassembled and placed in storage pending restoration and reuse. A modern bridge replaced it at the crossing.

It was listed on the National Register of Historic Places in 1988.
