= French Creek Township, Mercer County, Pennsylvania =

Township in Pennsylvania, US

Coordinates: 41°27′00″N 80°01′59″W

- Township
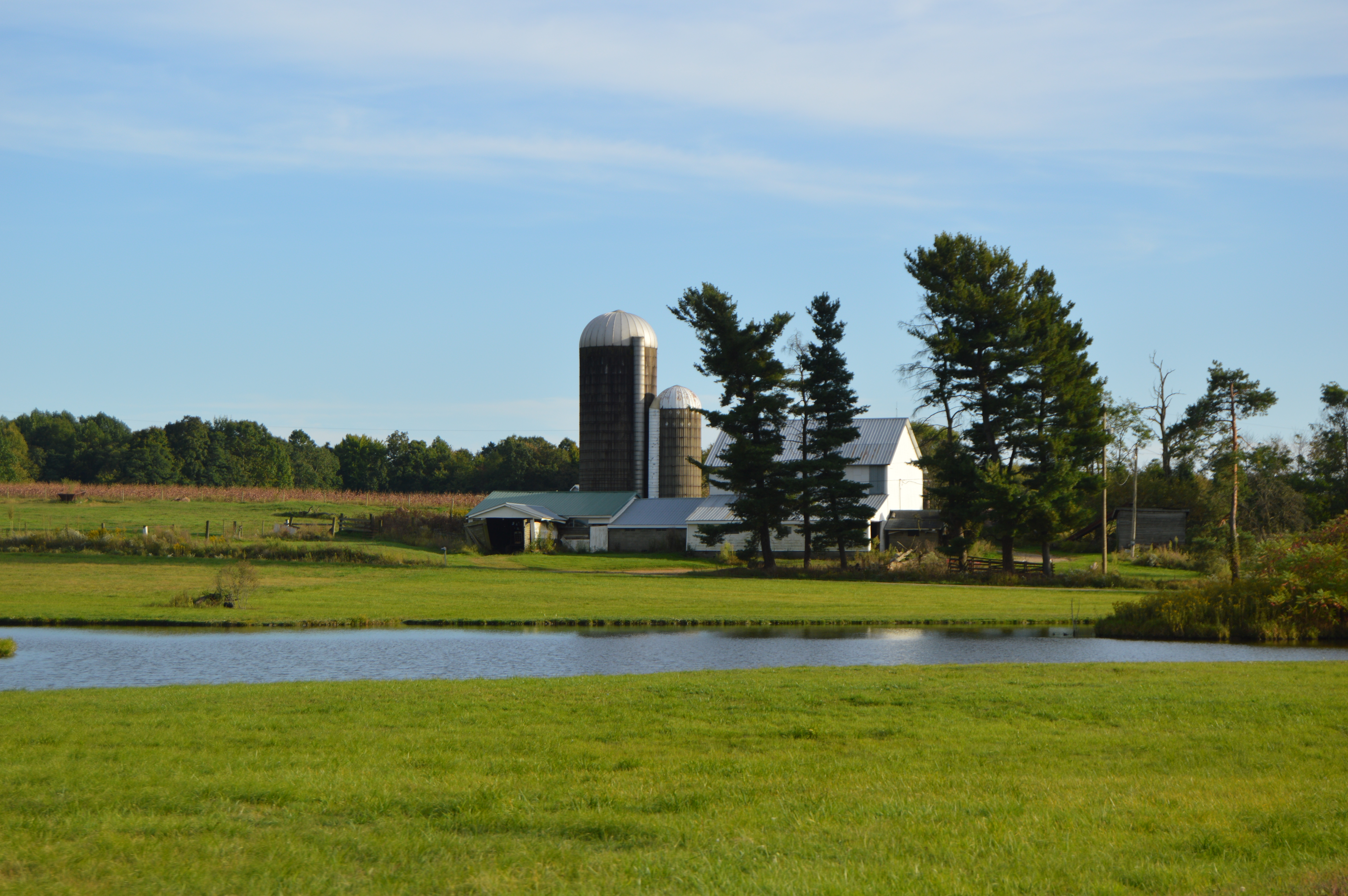
- Farmstead on Carter Road

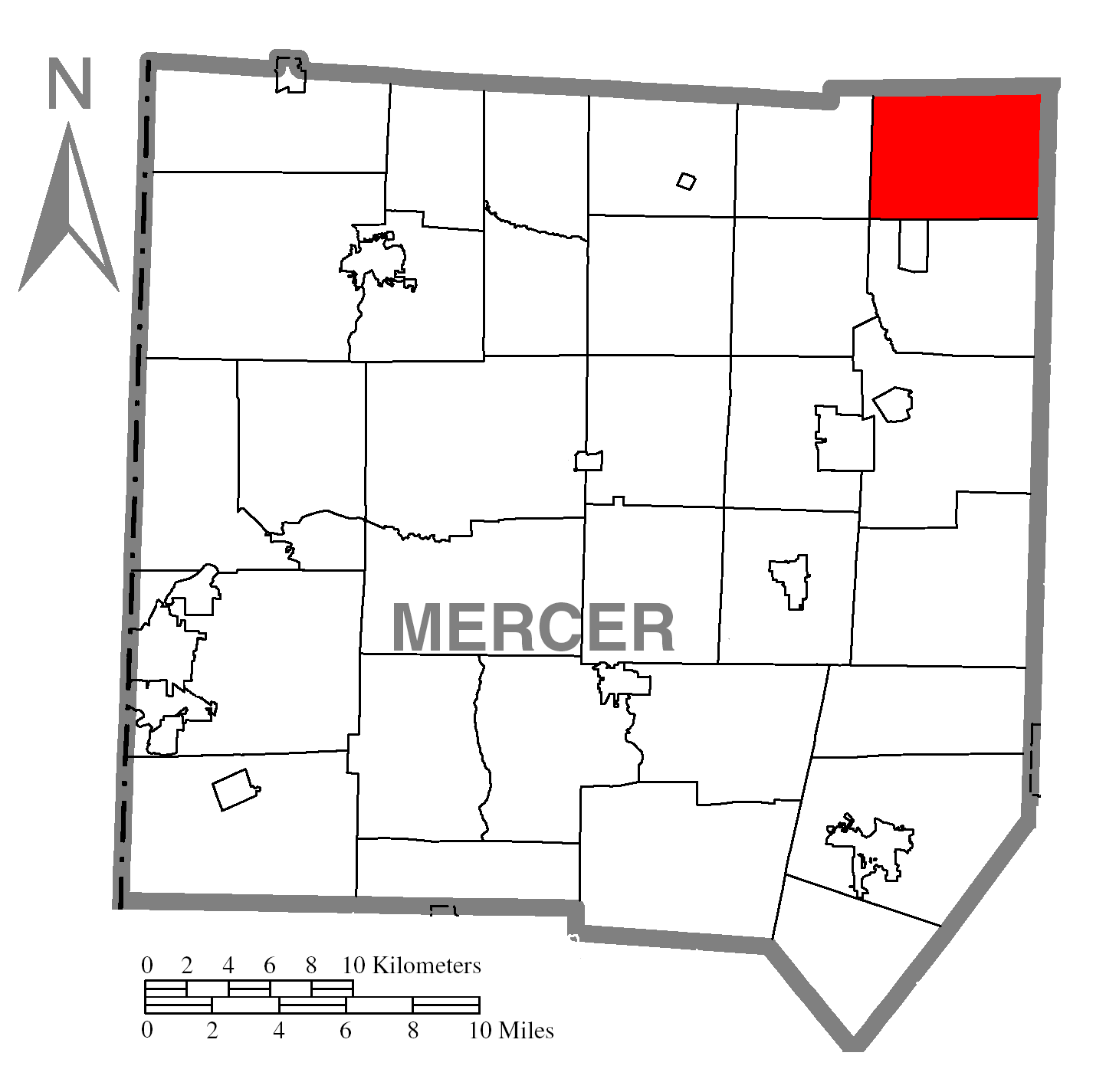
- Location of French Creek Township in Mercer County

- Location of Mercer County in Pennsylvania
- Country: United States
- State: Pennsylvania
- County: Mercer

Area
  - Total: 20.86 sq mi (54.02 km^{2})
  - Land: 20.72 sq mi (53.67 km^{2})
  - Water: 0.14 sq mi (0.35 km^{2})

Population (2020)
  - Total: 709
  - Estimate (2023): 701
  - Density: 36/sq mi (13.9/km^{2})
- Time zone: UTC-4 (EST)
  - Summer (DST): UTC-5 (EDT)
- Area codes: 724, 814
- FIPS code: 42-085-27824

Historical population
Census	Pop.	Note	%±
2000	764		—
2010	771		0.9%
2020	709		−8.0%
2023 (est.)	701		−1.1%
U.S. Decennial Census

French Creek Township is a township in Mercer County, Pennsylvania, United States. The population was 710 at the 2020 census, a decrease from the figure of 771 in 2010.

== History ==
The Bridge in French Creek Township was listed on the National Register of Historic Places in 1988.

== Geography ==
According to the United States Census Bureau, the township has a total area of 20.8 square miles (54 km^{2}), of which 20.7 square miles (54 km^{2}) is land and 0.1 square miles (0.26 km^{2}) (0.58%) is water.

== Demographics ==
As of the census of 2000, there were 764 people, 280 households, and 211 families residing in the township. The population density was 36.9 inhabitants per square mile (14.2/km^{2}). There were 309 housing units at an average density of 14.9/sq mi (5.8/km^{2}). The racial makeup of the township was 99.48% White, 0.13% Asian, 0.26% Pacific Islander, 0.13% from other races. Hispanic or Latino of any race were 0.79% of the population.

There were 280 households, out of which 35.7% had children under the age of 18 living with them, 66.8% were married couples living together, 6.4% had a female householder with no husband present, and 24.3% were non-families. 20.0% of all households were made up of individuals, and 7.5% had someone living alone who was 65 years of age or older. The average household size was 2.57 and the average family size was 2.99.

In the township the population was spread out, with 24.9% under the age of 18, 5.5% from 18 to 24, 28.0% from 25 to 44, 25.8% from 45 to 64, and 15.8% who were 65 years of age or older. The median age was 40 years. For every 100 females there were 99.5 males. For every 100 females age 18 and over, there were 95.9 males.

The median income for a household in the township was $35,568, and the median income for a family was $43,333. Males had a median income of $31,786 versus $23,125 for females. The per capita income for the township was $16,064. About 7.6% of families and 11.3% of the population were below the poverty line, including 14.5% of those under age 18 and 8.1% of those age 65 or over.
