= Christiana Lindsey House =

Historic house in Pennsylvania, United States

- U.S. National Register of Historic Places
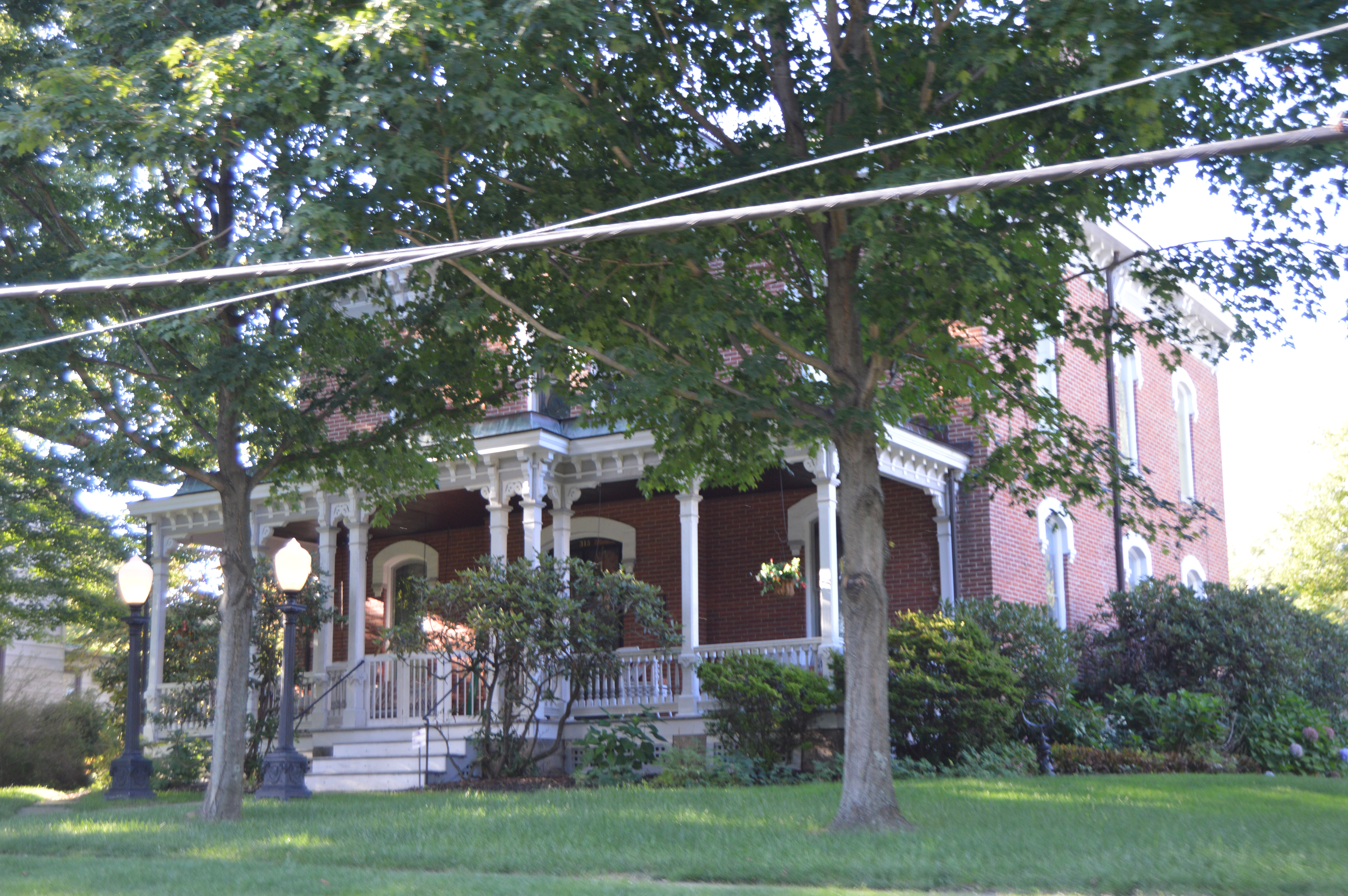
- Front and eastern side of the house

- Location within Pennsylvania Location within the United States
- Location: 313 E. Butler St., Mercer, Pennsylvania
- Coordinates: 41°13′31″N 80°14′7″W
- Area: less than one acre
- Built: 1881
- Architectural style: Italianate
- NRHP reference No.: 97001655
- Added to NRHP: January 15, 1998

Christiana Lindsey House is a historic home located at Mercer, Mercer County, Pennsylvania. It was built in 1881, and is a 2 1/2-story, brick residence with a 2-story rear ell in the Italianate style. It measures 34 feet wide and 39 feet deep. It sits on a raised ashlar sandstone foundation and has a slate covered truncated hipped roof. It features an elaborately detailed full-width front porch. Also on the property is a contributing summer kitchen, built about 1881.

It was added to the National Register of Historic Places in 1998.
