= Christian H. Buhl =

American politician and businessman (1810-1894)

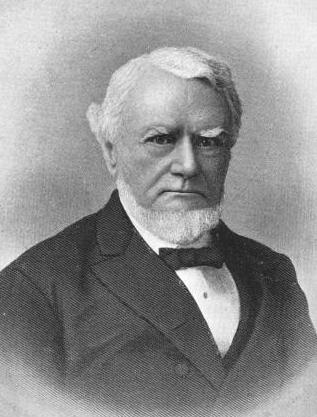

Mayor of Detroit
- In office 1860–1861
- Preceded by: John Patton
- Succeeded by: William C. Duncan

Personal details
- Born: May 9, 1810 Zelienople, Pennsylvania
- Died: January 23, 1894 (aged 83) Detroit, Michigan
- Spouse: Caroline DeLong (m. 1842)
- Children: 5, including Frank

Christian H. Buhl (May 9, 1810 – January 23, 1894) was a businessman and industrialist from Detroit, Michigan. He served as the city's mayor in 1860-61.

== Biography ==
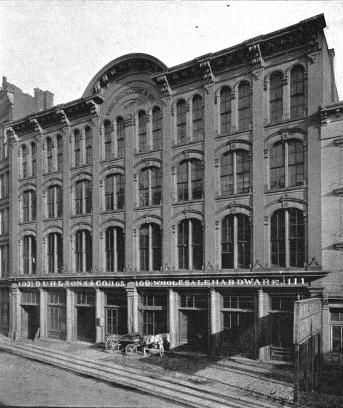
Buhl and Sons Hardware, c. 1891

Christian Henry Buhl was born in Zelienople, Pennsylvania on May 9, 1810. He learned the profession of a hatter from his Bavarian-born father, also named Christian, and in 1833 moved to Detroit, where he went into business with his older brother Frederick Buhl. The two diversified from hats into the fur trade, establishing a large and successful company under the name of the F & C H Buhl Co. In 1855, Christian retired from the fur trade and went into business with Charles Ducharme as a wholesale hardware firm. Buhl was also part owner of the Sharon Iron Works, the Detroit Locomotive Works (later the Buhl Iron Works). Buhl was also connected with the Detroit, Hillsdale, & Indiana Railroad and the Detroit, Eel River, & Illinois Railroad, as well as the Michigan State Bank, the Second National Bank of Detroit, and the Detroit National Bank, the last of which he was president of. He also organized Detroit Copper and Brass Company and the Peninsular Car Company.

Buhl was originally a Whig, but became a Republican after the party first formed. He served as an alderman of the city of Detroit, and was mayor in 1860-1861. In 1885, Buhl donated a substantial law library, worth $15,000, to the University of Michigan, and on his death willed an additional sum of $10,000 to increase the library.

In 1842, Buhl married Caroline DeLong of Utica, New York. The couple had five children, only two of whom — Theodore D. and Frank H. — outlived their parents. Christian H. Buhl died January 23, 1894.

Political offices
Preceded by John Patton	Mayor of Detroit; 1860–1861	Succeeded by William C. Duncan
