= Blaston =

Village in Leicestershire, England

Coordinates: 52.551°N 0.814°W

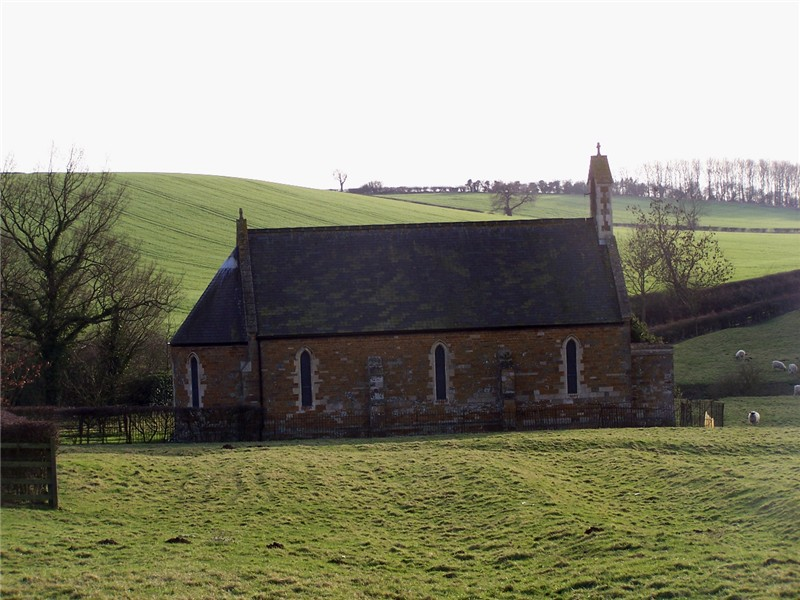
- St Giles' Church, Blaston

- Location within Leicestershire
- District: Harborough
- Shire county: Leicestershire
- Region: East Midlands
- Country: England
- Sovereign state: United Kingdom
- Post town: MARKET HARBOROUGH
- Postcode district: LE16
- Police: Leicestershire
- Fire: Leicestershire
- Ambulance: East Midlands
- UK Parliament: Rutland and Stamford

Blaston is a village and civil parish in the Harborough district of Leicestershire. It is a small parish with a population of 54 according to the 2001 census. As the population had remained less than 100, details from the 2011 census are included in the civil parish of Horninghold. The village is near Nevill Holt, Medbourne and Hallaton. St Giles' Church in Blaston was rebuilt in 1878. Blaston was first mentioned in the Domesday Book and the name probably means the settlement of Bleath (an Anglo-Saxon).

== Annual Show ==
There is an annual show on the last Sunday in June, organised by the Blaston and District Agricultural Society. In 2011, the show took place on Sunday 26 June, close to the nearby village of Slawston. The Show raises money for local charities.
