= Mercer County Courthouse (Pennsylvania) =

- Mercer County Court House
- U.S. National Register of Historic Places
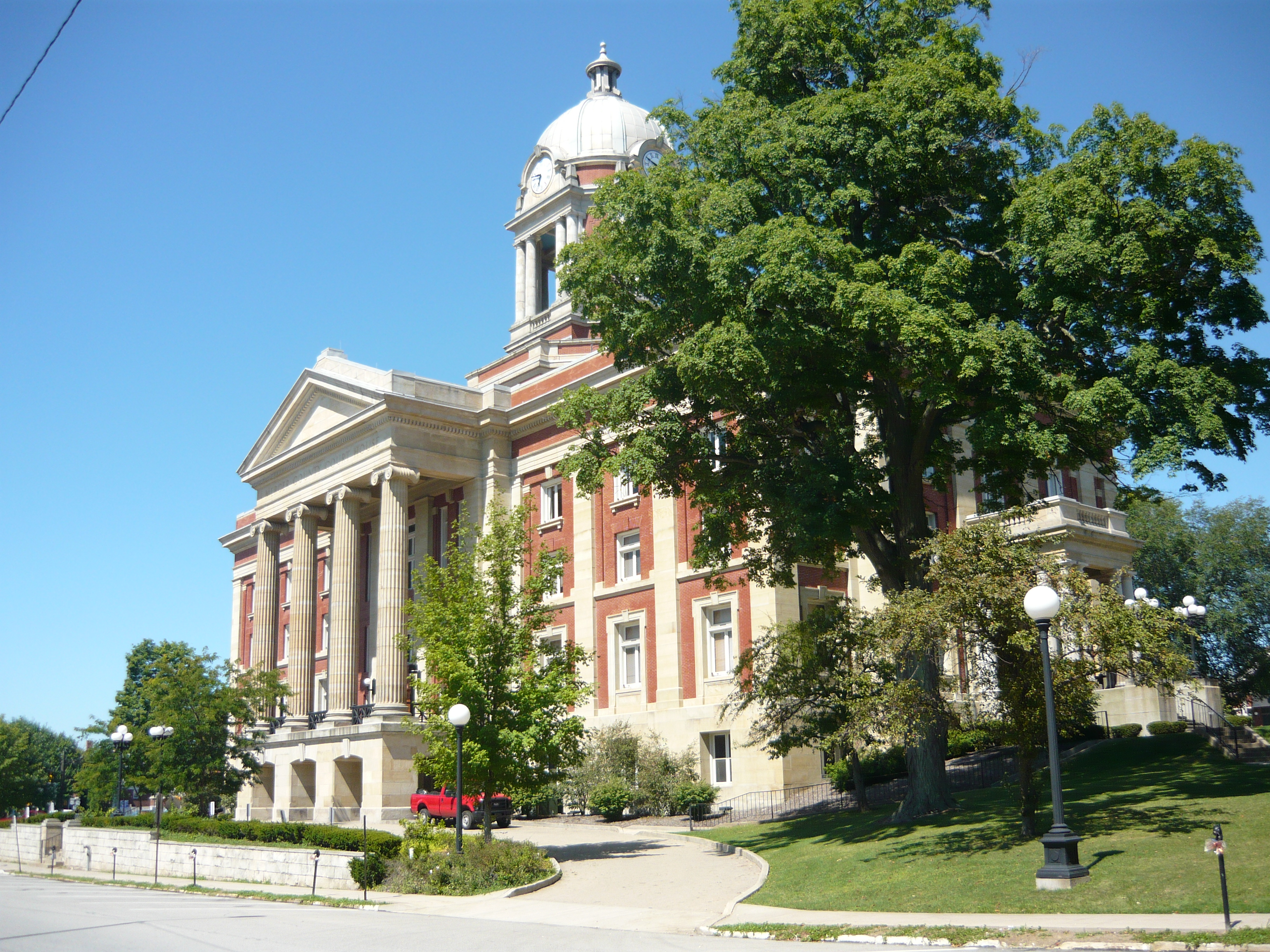
- Mercer County Courthouse, August 2010

- Location within Pennsylvania Location within the United States
- Location: Roughly along Diamond, Erie and Pitt Sts., Mercer, Pennsylvania
- Coordinates: 41.22691°N 80.23899°W
- Area: 2.4 acres (0.97 ha)
- Built: 1910-1911
- Architect: Owsley & Boucherle et al.
- Architectural style: Beaux Arts
- NRHP reference No.: 98001369
- Added to NRHP: November 12, 1998

The Mercer County Courthouse is an historic county courthouse that is located in Mercer, Mercer County, Pennsylvania.

It was added to the National Register of Historic Places in 1998.

== History and architectural features ==
Designed by the noted Youngstown architectural firm of Owsley & Boucherle, this historic structure was built between 1910 and 1911. It is a three-story, rectangular, red brick and light sandstone building that was created in the Beaux-Arts style. It measures 180 feet wide and ninety-two feet deep, and features a tall bell and clock tower. Also located on the property are two contributing resources: the Mercer County Soldiers' Monument and old Mercer County Jail, or South Court House Annex.
