= Jefferson Township, Mercer County, Pennsylvania =

Township in Pennsylvania, US

Coordinates: 41°14′30″N 80°18′29″W

Jefferson Township
- Township
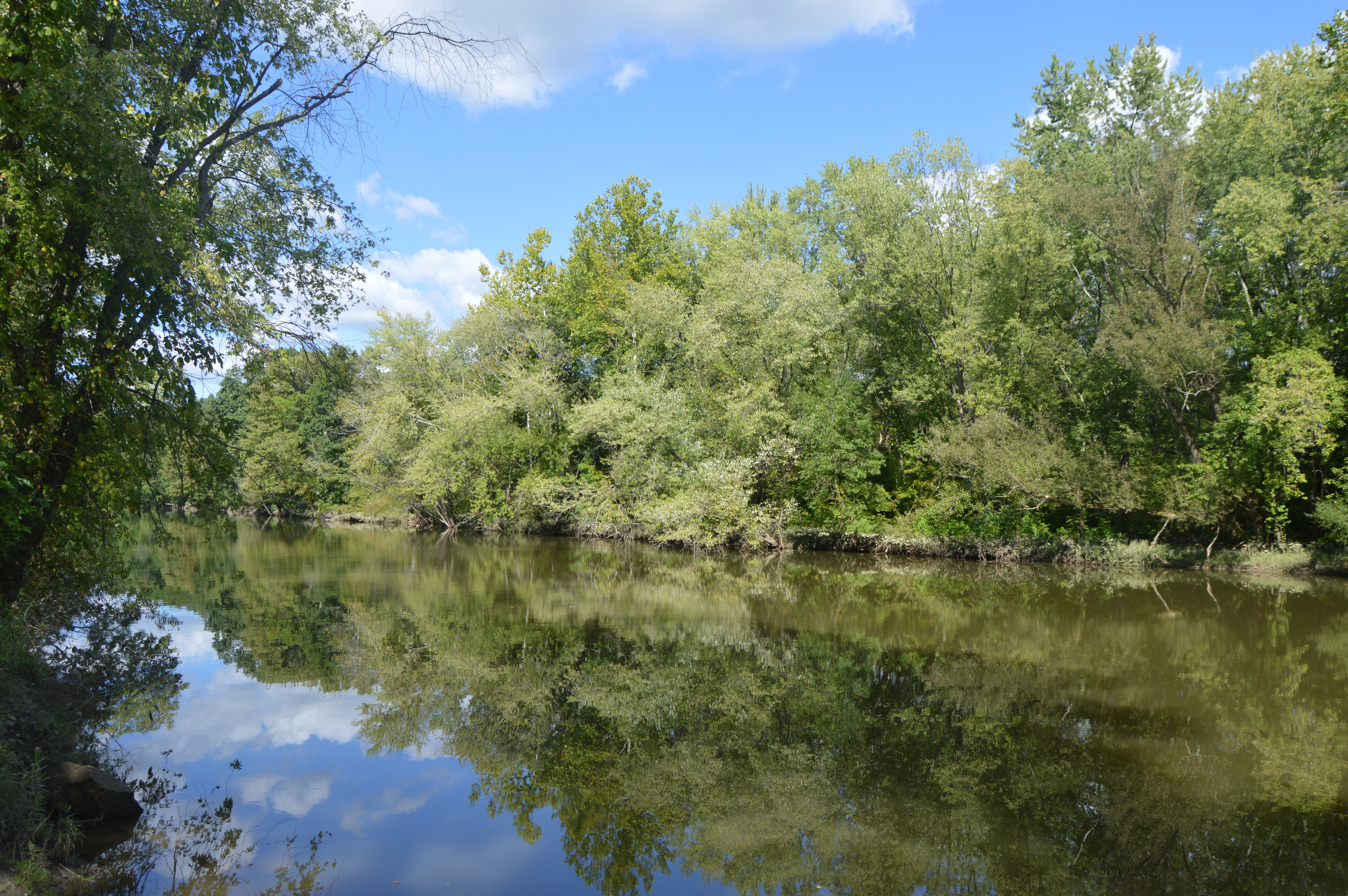
- Along the Shenango River

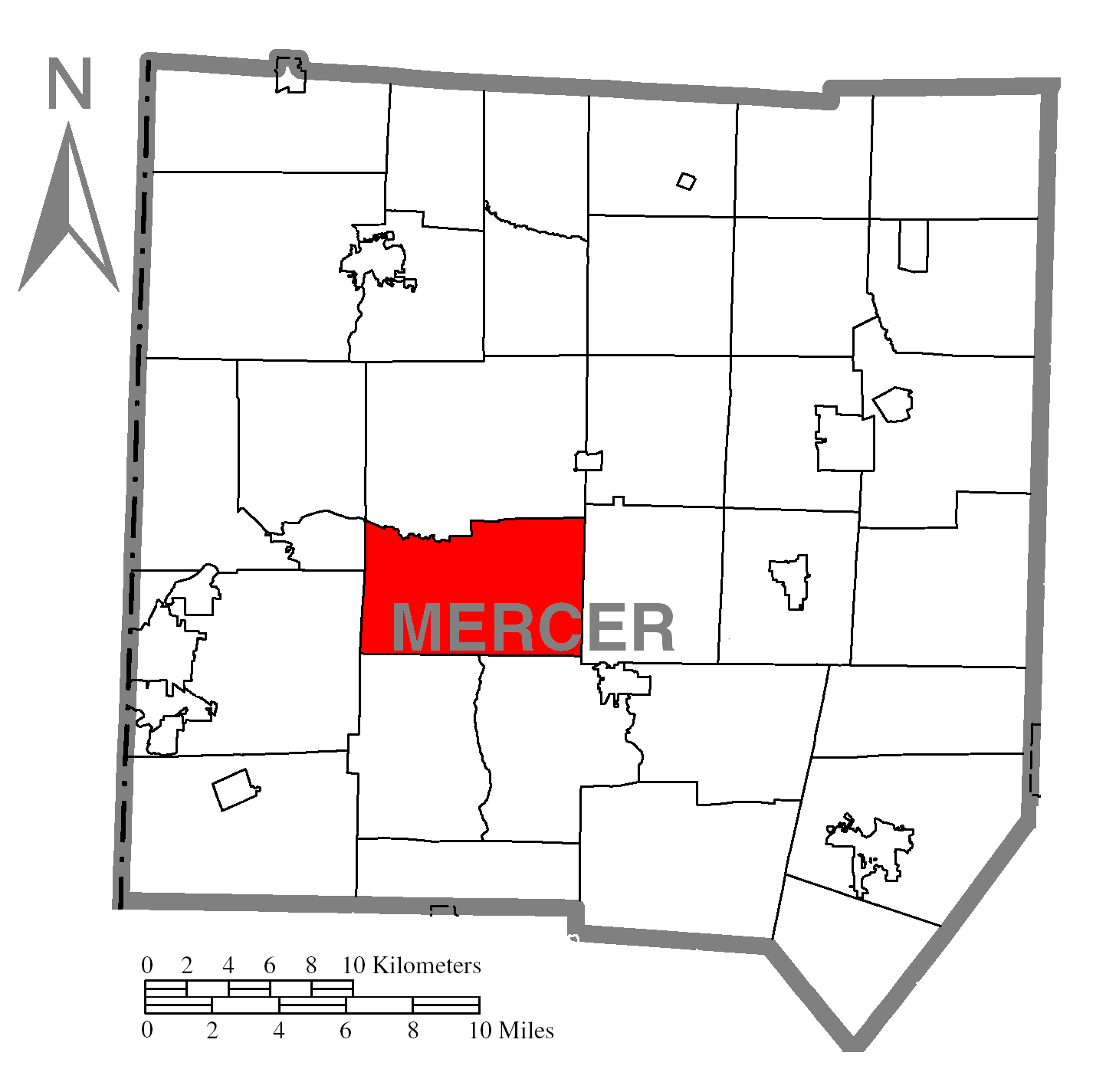
- Location of Jefferson Township in Mercer County

- Location of Mercer County in Pennsylvania
- Country: United States
- State: Pennsylvania
- County: Mercer

Area
  - Total: 25.44 sq mi (65.88 km^{2})
  - Land: 24.67 sq mi (63.89 km^{2})
  - Water: 0.77 sq mi (2.00 km^{2})

Population (2020)
  - Total: 1,920
  - Estimate (2023): 1,868
  - Density: 75.0/sq mi (28.96/km^{2})
- Time zone: UTC-4 (EST)
  - Summer (DST): UTC-5 (EDT)
- Area code: 724
- FIPS code: 42-085-37904
- Website: http://www.jeffersontwppa.com/

Historical population
| Census | Pop. | Note | %± |
|---|---|---|---|
| 2000 | 2,416 | | — |
| 2010 | 1,880 | | −22.2% |
| 2020 | 1,920 | | 2.1% |
| 2023 (est.) | 1,868 | | −2.7% |
U.S. Decennial Census

Jefferson Township is a township in Mercer County, Pennsylvania, United States. The population was 1,920 at the 2020 census, an increase from 1,880 in 2010.

== History ==
The Big Bend Historical Area was added to the National Register of Historic Places in 1975.

== Geography ==
According to the United States Census Bureau, the township has a total area of 25.3 square miles (66 km^{2}), of which 24.5 square miles (63 km^{2}) is land and 0.8 square miles (2.1 km^{2}) (3.08%) is water.

== Demographics ==
As of the census of 2000, there were 2,416 people, 958 households, and 699 families residing in the township. The population density was 98.5 inhabitants per square mile (38.0/km^{2}). There were 993 housing units at an average density of 40.5 per square mile (15.6/km^{2}). The racial makeup of the township was 98.43% White, 0.25% African American, 0.17% Native American, 0.33% Asian, 0.04% Pacific Islander, 0.12% from other races, and 0.66% from two or more races. Hispanic or Latino of any race were 0.50% of the population.

There were 958 households, out of which 31.0% had children under the age of 18 living with them, 60.4% were married couples living together, 8.2% had a female householder with no husband present, and 27.0% were non-families. 23.6% of all households were made up of individuals, and 8.2% had someone living alone who was 65 years of age or older. The average household size was 2.52 and the average family size was 2.96.

In the township the population was spread out, with 24.9% under the age of 18, 5.3% from 18 to 24, 29.7% from 25 to 44, 25.6% from 45 to 64, and 14.4% who were 65 years of age or older. The median age was 39 years. For every 100 females there were 98.4 males. For every 100 females age 18 and over, there were 98.7 males.

The median income for a household in the township was $34,872, and the median income for a family was $39,323. Males had a median income of $31,012 versus $21,964 for females. The per capita income for the township was $17,154. About 7.6% of families and 9.2% of the population were below the poverty line, including 12.9% of those under age 18 and 2.6% of those age 65 or over.
