= Mercer, Pennsylvania =

Borough in Pennsylvania, US

- Borough
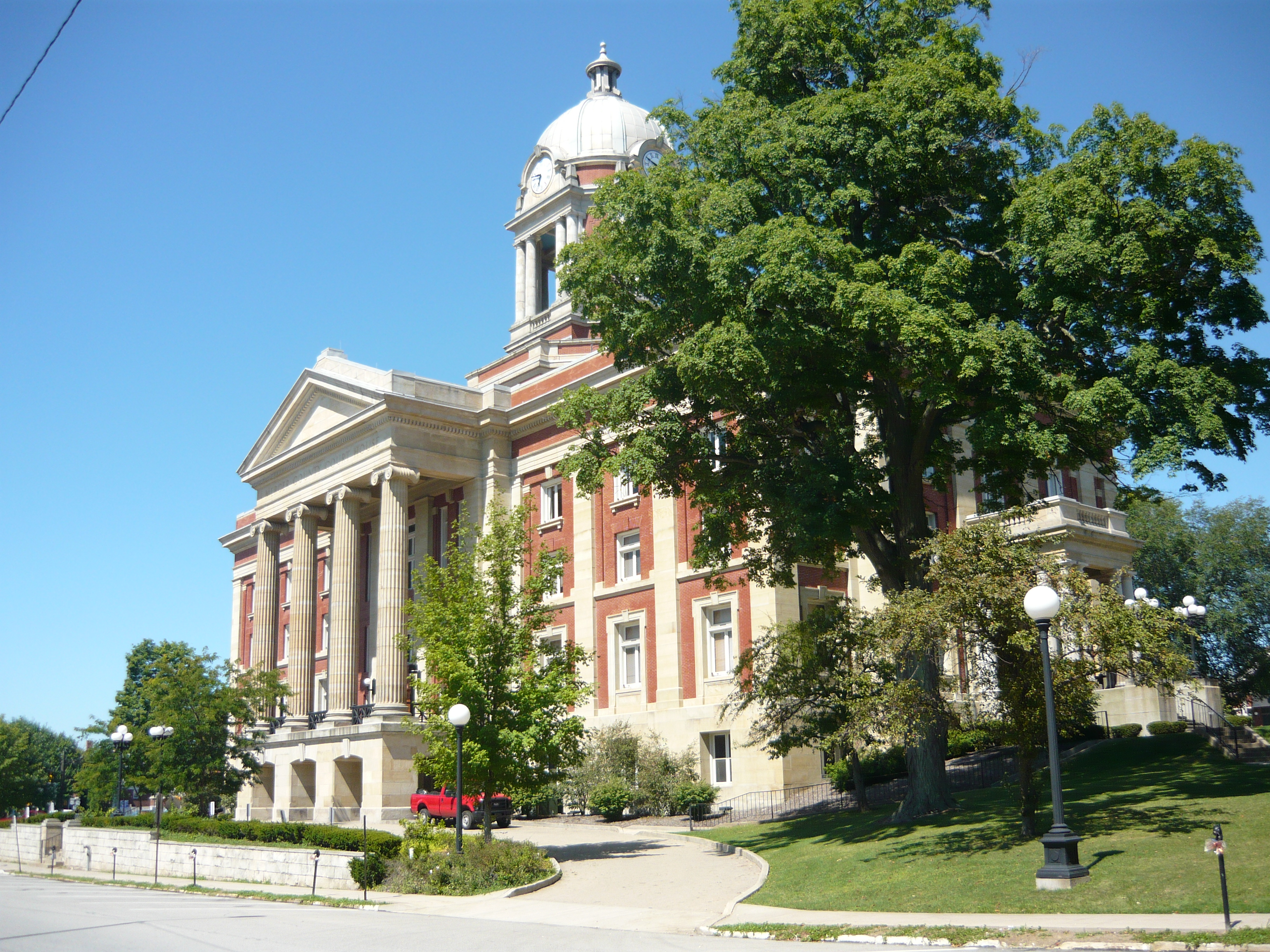
- Mercer County Courthouse (1909)
- Etymology: Hugh Mercer
- Motto: "Meet Me In Mercer"
- Location of Mercer in Mercer County, Pennsylvania.

- Location within Pennsylvania Location within the United States
- Coordinates: 41°13′35″N 80°14′15″W
- Country: United States
- State: Pennsylvania
- County: Mercer
- Established: 1803
- Incorporated (borough): 1814

Government
  - Mayor: Richard Konzen (D)

Area
  - Total: 1.16 sq mi (3.00 km^{2})
  - Land: 1.16 sq mi (3.00 km^{2})
  - Water: 0 sq mi (0.00 km^{2})
- Elevation (Mercer County Courthouse): 1,280 ft (390 m)
- Highest elevation (Mercer County Courthouse): 1,280 ft (390 m)
- Lowest elevation (Neshannock Creek): 1,075 ft (328 m)

Population (2020)
  - Total: 1,982
  - Density: 1,712.9/sq mi (661.37/km^{2})
- Time zone: UTC-4 (EST)
  - Summer (DST): UTC-5 (EDT)
- Zip code: 16137
- Area code: 724
- FIPS code: 42-48696
- Website: https://mercerborough.com/

Mercer is a borough in Mercer County, Pennsylvania, United States, and its county seat. The population was 1,982 at the 2020 census. It is part of the Hermitage micropolitan area.

The community was named after Brigadier General Hugh Mercer. The Mercer County Court House and Christiana Lindsey House are listed on the National Register of Historic Places.

== Geography ==
Mercer is located at 41°13′35″N 80°14′15″W (41.226347, -80.237436). According to the United States Census Bureau, the borough has a total area of 1.2 square miles (3.1 km^{2}), all land.

== Demographics ==
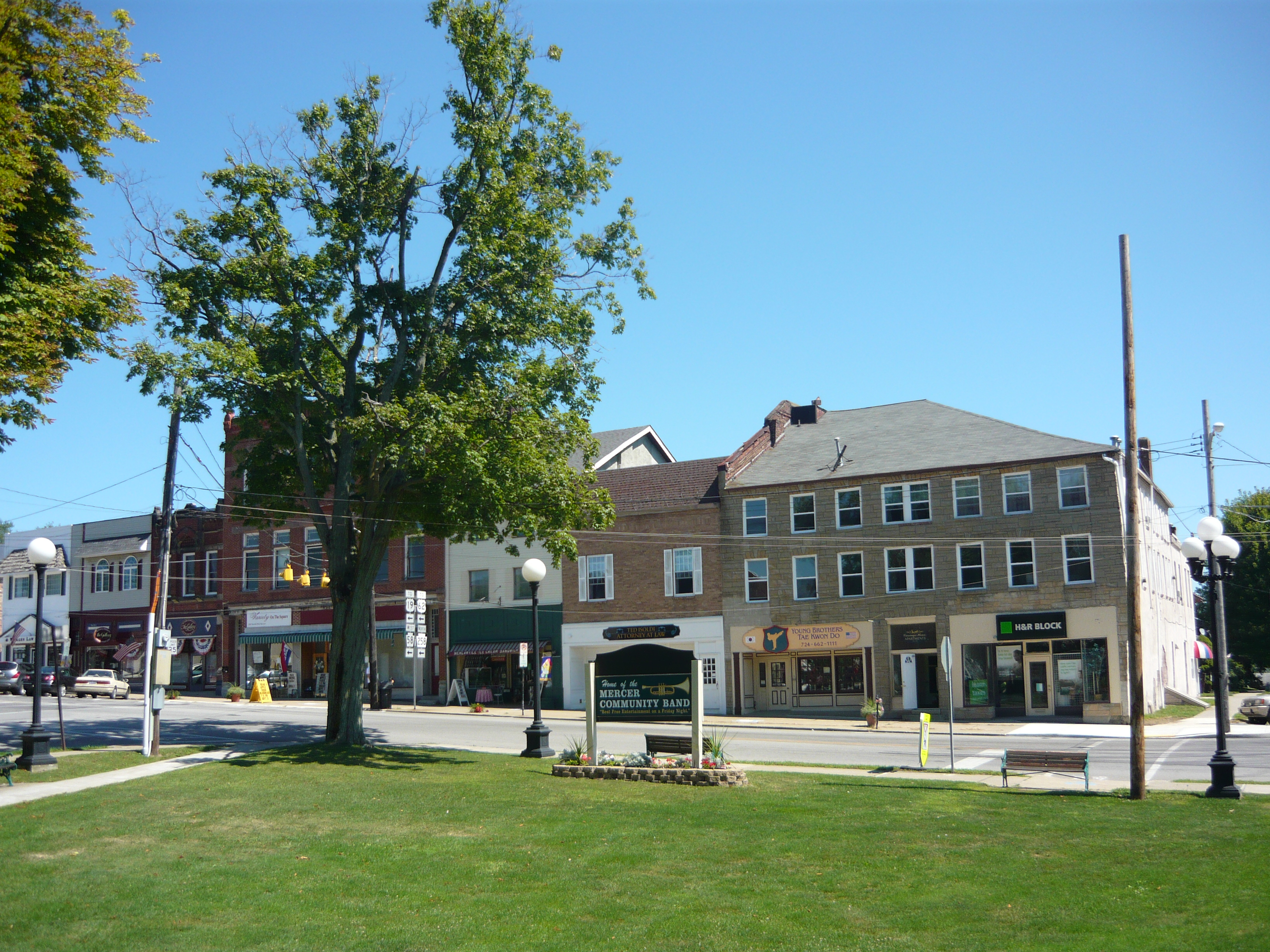
Businesses on Pitt Street

Historical population
| Census | Pop. | Note | %± |
|---|---|---|---|
| 1820 | 506 | | — |
| 1830 | 656 | | 29.6% |
| 1840 | 781 | | 19.1% |
| 1850 | 1,004 | | 28.6% |
| 1860 | 1,249 | | 24.4% |
| 1870 | 1,235 | | −1.1% |
| 1880 | 2,344 | | 89.8% |
| 1890 | 2,138 | | −8.8% |
| 1900 | 1,804 | | −15.6% |
| 1910 | 2,026 | | 12.3% |
| 1920 | 1,932 | | −4.6% |
| 1930 | 2,125 | | 10.0% |
| 1940 | 2,272 | | 6.9% |
| 1950 | 2,397 | | 5.5% |
| 1960 | 2,800 | | 16.8% |
| 1970 | 2,773 | | −1.0% |
| 1980 | 2,532 | | −8.7% |
| 1990 | 2,444 | | −3.5% |
| 2000 | 2,391 | | −2.2% |
| 2010 | 2,002 | | −16.3% |
| 2020 | 1,982 | | −1.0% |
| 2021 (est.) | 1,964 | ▼ | −0.9% |

As of the census of 2000, there were 2,391 people, 1,020 households, and 609 families residing in the borough. The population density was 1,930.3 people per square mile (745.3 people/km^{2}). There were 1,086 housing units at an average density of 876.7 per square mile (338.5/km^{2}). The racial makeup of the borough was 96.45% White, 2.17% African American, 0.17% Native American, 0.21% Asian, 0.04% Pacific Islander, 0.17% from other races, and 0.79% from two or more races. Hispanic or Latino of any race were 0.84% of the population.

There were 1,020 households, out of which 26.8% had children under the age of 18 living with them, 43.7% were married couples living together, 13.1% had a female householder with no husband present, and 40.2% were non-families. 34.2% of all households were made up of individuals, and 13.3% had someone living alone who was 65 years of age or older. The average household size was 2.24 and the average family size was 2.89.

In the borough the population was spread out, with 22.2% under the age of 18, 9.2% from 18 to 24, 29.2% from 25 to 44, 22.6% from 45 to 64, and 16.8% who were 65 years of age or older. The median age was 37 years. For every 100 females there were 100.8 males. For every 100 females age 18 and over, there were 95.3 males.

The median income for a household in the borough was $29,795, and the median income for a family was $46,979. Males had a median income of $27,371 versus $19,576 for females. The per capita income for the borough was $22,161. About 6.0% of families and 9.0% of the population were below the poverty line, including 8.8% of those under age 18 and 8.5% of those age 65 or over.

== Arts and culture ==
The United States post office in Mercer contains a mural, Clearing the Land, painted in 1940 by Lorin Thompson. Murals were produced from 1934 to 1943 in the United States through the Section of Painting and Sculpture, later called the Section of Fine Arts, of the Treasury Department.

== Education ==
Children in Mercer are served by the public Mercer Area School District. The current schools serving the borough include:

- Mercer Area Elementary School – grades K-6
- Mercer Area Middle-High School – grades 7-12

== Notable people ==
- John Bingham, drafter of the Fourteenth Amendment to the United States Constitution and longest serving U.S. Ambassador to Japan
- Leech Maskrey, Major League Baseball outfielder for the Louisville Eclipse/Colonels and Cincinnati Red Stockings
- Gary Peters, Major League Baseball pitcher for the Chicago White Sox and Boston Red Sox
- Trent Reznor, musician; lead singer for industrial rock band Nine Inch Nails
- David Vogan, mathematician
- Samuel Waugh, painter
- J. C. Williamson, actor and impresario
