= Potter Run (Neshannock Creek tributary) =

River in Pennsylvania

Potter Run Tributary to Neshannock Creek
- Location of Potter Run mouth Potter Run (Neshannock Creek tributary) (the United States)

Location
- Country: United States of America
- State: Pennsylvania
- County: Lawrence
- Township: Washington

Physical characteristics
- Source: divide between Potter Run and Slippery Rock Creek
  - location: about 3 miles southeast of Volant, Pennsylvania
  - coordinates: 41°04′42″N 080°14′10″W
  - elevation: 1,258 ft (383 m)
- Mouth: Neshannock Creek
  - location: About 0.25 miles downstream of Volant, Pennsylvania
  - coordinates: 41°06′29″N 080°15′47″W
  - elevation: 1,000 ft (300 m)
- Length: 3.74 mi (6.02 km)
- Basin size: 5.69 square miles (14.7 km^{2})
- Discharge
  - average: 7.79 cu ft/s (0.221 m^{3}/s) at mouth with Potter Run

Basin features
- Progression: Neshannock Creek → Shenango River → Beaver River → Ohio River → Mississippi River → Gulf of Mexico
- River system: Beaver River
- Tributaries
  - left: unnamed tributaries
  - right: unnamed tributaries

Potter Run is a tributary to Neshannock Creek in western Pennsylvania. The stream rises in south-central Lawrence County and flows west and enters Neshannock Creek just downstream of Volant, Pennsylvania. The watershed is roughly 50% agricultural, 44% forested and the rest is other uses.
