= Beaver Run =

Beaver Run may refer to:

- Beaver Run (Bowman Creek), in Wyoming County, Pennsylvania
- Beaver Run (Neshannock Creek tributary), a stream in Mercer County, Pennsylvania
- Beaver Run (Buffalo Creek), in Union County, Pennsylvania
- Beaver Run (Catawissa Creek), in Columbia County, Pennsylvania
- Beaver Run (Chillisquaque Creek), in Northumberland County and Montour County, Pennsylvania
- Beaver Run (County Line Branch), in Northumberland County and Montour County, Pennsylvania
- Beaver Run (Little Muncy Creek), in Sullivan County and Lycoming County, Pennsylvania
- Beaver Run (Tohickon Creek), in Bucks County, Pennsylvania
- Beaver Run (South Branch French Creek tributary), a stream in Erie County, Pennsylvania
- Beaver Run (Walhonding River), in Coshocton County, Ohio
- Beaver Run or Beaverdam Run, in Carbon County, Pennsylvania

== See also ==
- Beaver Run Reservoir
