= Hottenbaugh Run =

River in Pennsylvania

Hottenbaugh Run Tributary to Neshannock Creek
- Location of Hottenbaugh Run mouth Hottenbaugh Run (the United States)

Location
- Country: United States of America
- State: Pennsylvania
- County: Lawrence
- Townships: Hickory; Scott

Physical characteristics
- Source: divide between Hottenbaugh Run, Potter Run, and Slippery Rock Creek
  - location: about 3.5 miles southeast of Volant, Pennsylvania
  - coordinates: 41°05′03″N 080°13′07″W
  - elevation: 1,290 ft (390 m)
- Mouth: Neshannock Creek
  - location: about 0.25 southeast of Painter Hill
  - coordinates: 41°02′28″N 080°18′04″W
  - elevation: 890 ft (270 m)
- Length: 8.07 mi (12.99 km)
- Basin size: 18.93 square miles (49.0 km^{2})
- Discharge
  - average: 17.62 cu ft/s (0.499 m^{3}/s) at mouth with Neshannock Creek

Basin features
- Progression: Neshannock Creek → Shenango River → Beaver River → Ohio River → Mississippi River → Gulf of Mexico
- River system: Beaver River
- Tributaries
  - left: unnamed tributaries
  - right: unnamed tributaries
- Waterbodies: unnamed impoundment near Lakewood Park

Hottenbaugh Run is a tributary of Neshannock Creek in western Pennsylvania. The stream rises in east-central Lawrence County and flows south then west entering Neshannock Creek at Painter Hill. The watershed is roughly 53% agricultural, 40% forested and the rest is other uses.
