= Hunters Run (Neshannock Creek tributary) =

River in Pennsylvania

Hunters Run Tributary to Neshannock Creek
- Location of Hunters Run mouth Hunters Run (Neshannock Creek tributary) (the United States)

Location
- Country: United States of America
- State: Pennsylvania
- County: Mercer; Lawrence
- Townships: Springfield; Washington

Physical characteristics
- Source: divide between Hunters Run and Slippery Rock Creek (Taylors Run)
  - location: about 0.25 miles southwest of Drake, Pennsylvania
  - coordinates: 41°06′45″N 080°11′53″W
  - elevation: 1,220 ft (370 m)
- Mouth: Neshannock Creek
  - location: about 0.5 miles northwest of Springfield Falls, Pennsylvania
  - coordinates: 41°09′06″N 080°13′47″W
  - elevation: 1,040 ft (320 m)
- Length: 4.0 mi (6.4 km)
- Basin size: 7.21 square miles (18.7 km^{2})
- Discharge
  - average: 10.40 cu ft/s (0.294 m^{3}/s) at mouth with Neshannock Creek

Basin features
- Progression: Neshannock Creek → Shenango River → Beaver River → Ohio River → Mississippi River → Gulf of Mexico
- River system: Beaver River
- Tributaries
  - left: unnamed tributaries
  - right: unnamed tributaries

Hunters Run is a tributary to Neshannock Creek in western Pennsylvania. The stream rises in northeastern Lawrence County and flows northwest entering Neshannock Creek near Springfield Falls, Pennsylvania. The watershed is roughly 32% agricultural, 60% forested and the rest is other uses. This watershed drains the northern portion of State Game Lands #284 and is the location for Springfield Falls, a prominent waterfall on the run.
