= Pine Run (Neshannock Creek tributary) =

River in Pennsylvania

Pine Run Tributary to Neshannock Creek
- Location of Pine Run mouth Pine Run (Neshannock Creek tributary) (the United States)

Location
- Country: United States of America
- State: Pennsylvania
- County: Mercer
- Townships: Springfield; Findley

Physical characteristics
- Source: divide between Pine Run and Wolf Creek (Barmore Run)
  - location: about 2 miles northeast of Blacktown, Pennsylvania
  - coordinates: 41°10′46″N 080°08′52″W
  - elevation: 1,280 ft (390 m)
- Mouth: Neshannock Creek
  - location: about 1 mile northeast of Millburn, Pennsylvania
  - coordinates: 41°10′41″N 080°13′30″W
  - elevation: 1,060 ft (320 m)
- Length: 5.08 mi (8.18 km)
- Basin size: 8.85 square miles (22.9 km^{2})
- Discharge
  - average: 13.31 cu ft/s (0.377 m^{3}/s) at mouth with Neshannock Creek

Basin features
- Progression: Neshannock Creek → Shenango River → Beaver River → Ohio River → Mississippi River → Gulf of Mexico
- River system: Beaver River
- Tributaries
  - left: unnamed tributaries
  - right: unnamed tributaries

Pine Run is a tributary to Neshannock Creek in western Pennsylvania. The stream rises in southeastern Mercer County and flows west entering Neshannock Creek south and downstream of Mercer, Pennsylvania. The watershed is roughly 41% agricultural, 50% forested and the rest is other uses.
