= Wilmington Area High School =

High school in Pennsylvania, United States

Wilmington Area High School is a public school in New Wilmington, Pennsylvania, that teaches grades 9 through 12. It is part of the Wilmington Area School District. Enrollment usually fluctuates between 450 and 500 students every year. The mascot of the school is a greyhound. The school colors are blue and gold. Many sports and extracurricular activities are offered in the school.

== Description ==
The school educates students in 9th through 12th grades. It is the only high school for the Wilmington Area School District which covers 111 sq mi (290 km^{2}) between the Ohio state line and Butler county. Students reside in New Wilmington, Volant, Plain Grove, Pulaski, Washington, Wilmington Township (Lawrence County), and Wilmington Township (Mercer County). Total student enrollment is officially 455, usually fluctuating between 450 and 500. It is located at 350 Wood Street New Wilmington, PA 16142. It is a public school.

== Awards and recognition ==
In July 2017, the District was awarded the distinction of a Google Reference District. Google for Education Reference Districts are districts that demonstrate excellence and thought leadership through the innovative use of technology, including G Suite for Education (formerly known as Google Apps for Education) and Chromebooks, to drive impact and positive learning outcomes.

In August, 2017, the Wilmington Area School District became the first district to become a 1:1 school in the tri-county area. Each student is provided a mobile device to enhance learning and provide a modern education.

== Faculty and staff ==
The high school's principal is Mr. Michael L. Wright. 32 teachers make up the faculty of the high school. The student-to-teacher ratio is about 14 to 1.

A psychologist and nurse are on staff, as is a guidance department. Specialists focus on students with special needs such as those who are gifted or who have learning disabilities.

Dr. Jeffrey Matty is the Superintendent and Ms. Mary Ann Grubic who is the Special Education Supervisor.

== Curriculum ==
Wilmington high school offers many classes for its many student's interests. Core classes, physical education, health, Advanced Placement (AP), and electives are offered. Also, special needs programs are offered.

Math, Language Arts, Social Studies, and Science fall under the core class subjects.

Math classes include:

- Pre Algebra
- Algebra 1
- Learning Support Algebra 1
- Algebra 2
- Geometry
- Co teach Geometry
- Learning Support Geometry
- Statistics/Intro to Calculus (Weighted 5 percentage points)
- Pre-calculus (Weighted 5 percentage points)
- Practical Applications of Math (Weighted 10 percentage points)

Language Arts classes include:

- English 9
- Honors English 9 (Weighted 5 percentage points)
- English 10
- Honors English 10 (Weighted 5 percentage points)
- English 11
- Learning Support English 11
- Co teach English 11
- English 12
- Complete Grammar, Usage, and Mechanics

Social Studies classes include:

- Civics
- Honors Civics
- History 10
- Honors History 10
- World History 11

Science classes include:

- Biology 9
- Honors Biology 9 (Weighted 5 percentage points)
- Chemistry 1
- Organic Chemistry
- Environmental Science
- General Science
- Physics (Weighted 5 percentage points)
- Conceptual Science
- Advanced Chemistry Applications

== Extracurricular activities ==
Students participate in many activities, including sports, marching band, Ambassadors club, key club, Future Business Leaders of America (FBLA), and Future Farmers of America (FFA), Choir, Women's Choir, Chamber Singers, Charity Club, Science Olympiad, Student Council, National Honor Society, and Students Working to Advance Technology (SWAT).

Football, volleyball, and basketball are popular team sports. Other sports include baseball, softball, soccer, tennis, track, cross-country, hockey, and wrestling. Also, there is a bocce team, offering students with special needs a chance to participate in sports.

The school newspaper is the Blue and Gold (named for the school colors). An annual yearbook is published as well.

== Financial ==
The budget is around 20 million dollars a year. 1% of this is from student tuition. About 1.1 million dollar is from federal. State funding is 5.7% for regular ed and 1.3% for special ed totaling to around 10.1 million dollars. Around 14,000 dollars is spent per pupil. The top salary is 70,900 per year and the average salary is $63,991 per year. There are 5.37 million dollars assigned and 2.2 million unassigned.

== Sports ==
There are teams for football, soccer, tennis, basketball, volleyball, golf, wrestling, hockey, track and field, baseball, cross country, and bocce. The ranks are Football AA, girls & boys soccer A, Tennis AA, Golf AA, boys & girls basketball AA, baseball & softball AA, boys Track & Field AA, cross country A, and volleyball AA. Information on these rankings can be found at PIAA.

== Enrollment ==
In the 2018–2019 school year there were a total of 371 students. In 9th grade there were 98 students, 10th grade had 101 students, 11th grade had 84 students and 12th grade had 88 students.

== AP courses ==
The AP classes that are available are AP Biology, AP Calculus, AP English, AP Gov, AP US History and these classes are weighted 10%. In 2018-2019 year there are 81 students taking AP courses.

== Honors classes ==
The honors classes include Honors English, Honors History and Advanced Biology. These classes are weighted by 5%.

== Graduation requirements ==
- English: 4 credits
- Social Studies/History: 4 credits
- Science: 3.5 Credits
- Mathematics 3 credits
- Arts & Humanities: 1 credit
- Physical Education: 1.5 credits
- Health: 0.5 credits
- Electives: 10 credits
- Keystone Proficiency
- TOTAL: 27.5 credits

== Board of education ==
The Wilmington Area School District is governed by nine elected members who serve as Directors on the Board of education. Directors serve for multi-year terms without pay.
