= Banks Covered Bridge =

- U.S. National Register of Historic Places
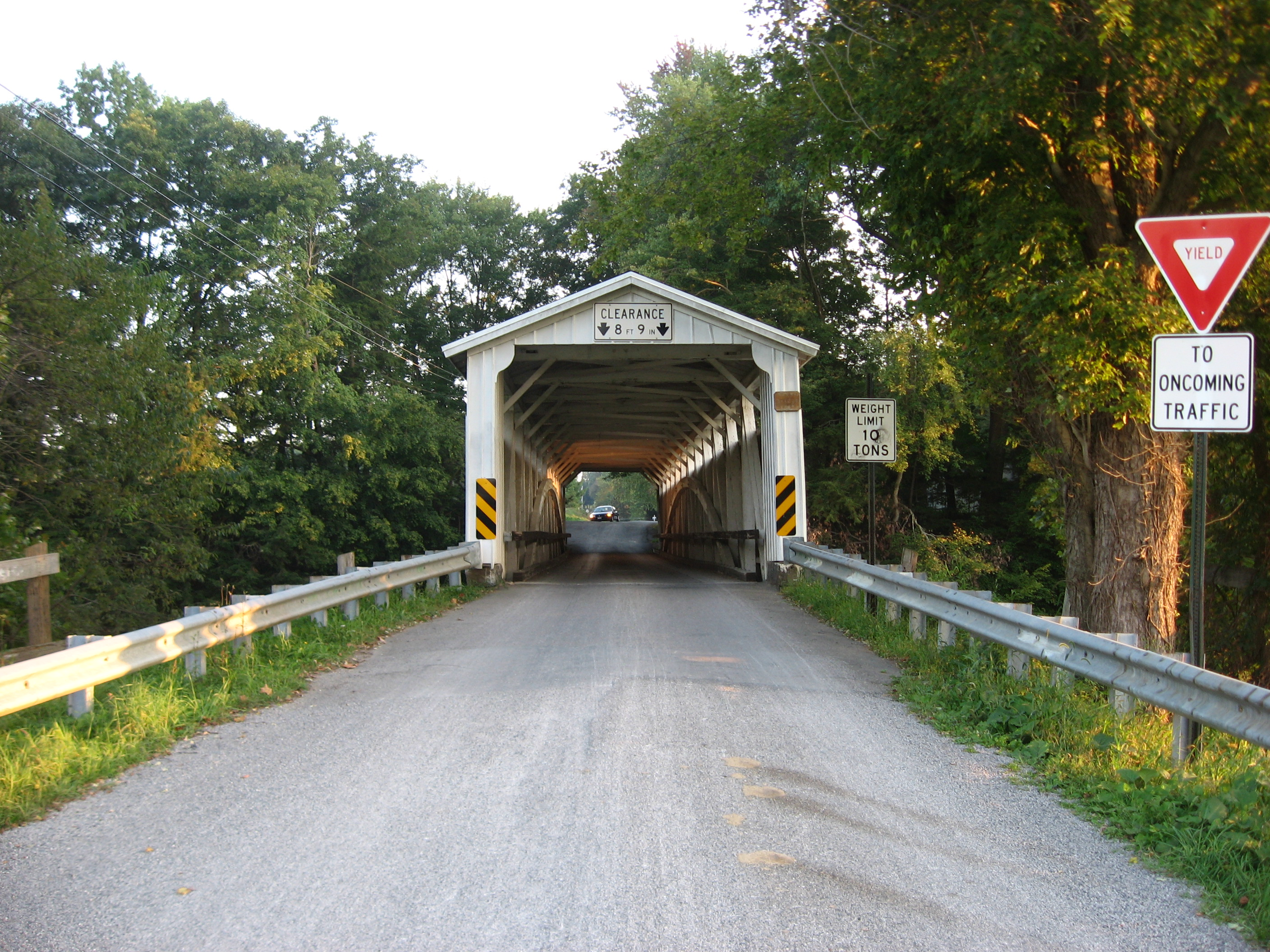
- Northern entrance to the bridge

- Location within Pennsylvania Location within the United States
- Location: Southeast of New Wilmington on Township 476
- Nearest city: New Wilmington, Pennsylvania
- Coordinates: 41°5′26″N 80°17′10″W
- Area: 0.1 acres (0.040 ha)
- Built: 1889
- Architectural style: Burr arch truss
- MPS: Lawrence County Covered Bridges TR
- NRHP reference No.: 80003543
- Added to NRHP: June 27, 1980

The Banks Covered Bridge is a wooden covered bridge in Wilmington Township, Lawrence County, Pennsylvania, United States. It spans the Neshannock Creek southeast of New Wilmington. Constructed in 1889, the bridge is a Burr arch truss built on stone foundations and supported by steel girders; it is 121 feet (37 m) long.

Unlike many Pennsylvania counties, Lawrence County never possessed many covered bridges; perhaps only five such bridges were ever built in the county. Today, only the Banks Covered Bridge and the McConnell's Mill Covered Bridge near Rose Point remain. While the Howe truss used by the McConnell's Mill bridge is very rare, the Burr arch truss used by the Banks bridge is employed by many Pennsylvania bridges. Its interior walls are similar to those featured on many covered bridges in Bucks County.

In 1980, the bridge was placed on the National Register of Historic Places in recognition of its historical significance, along with the McConnell's Mill bridge.

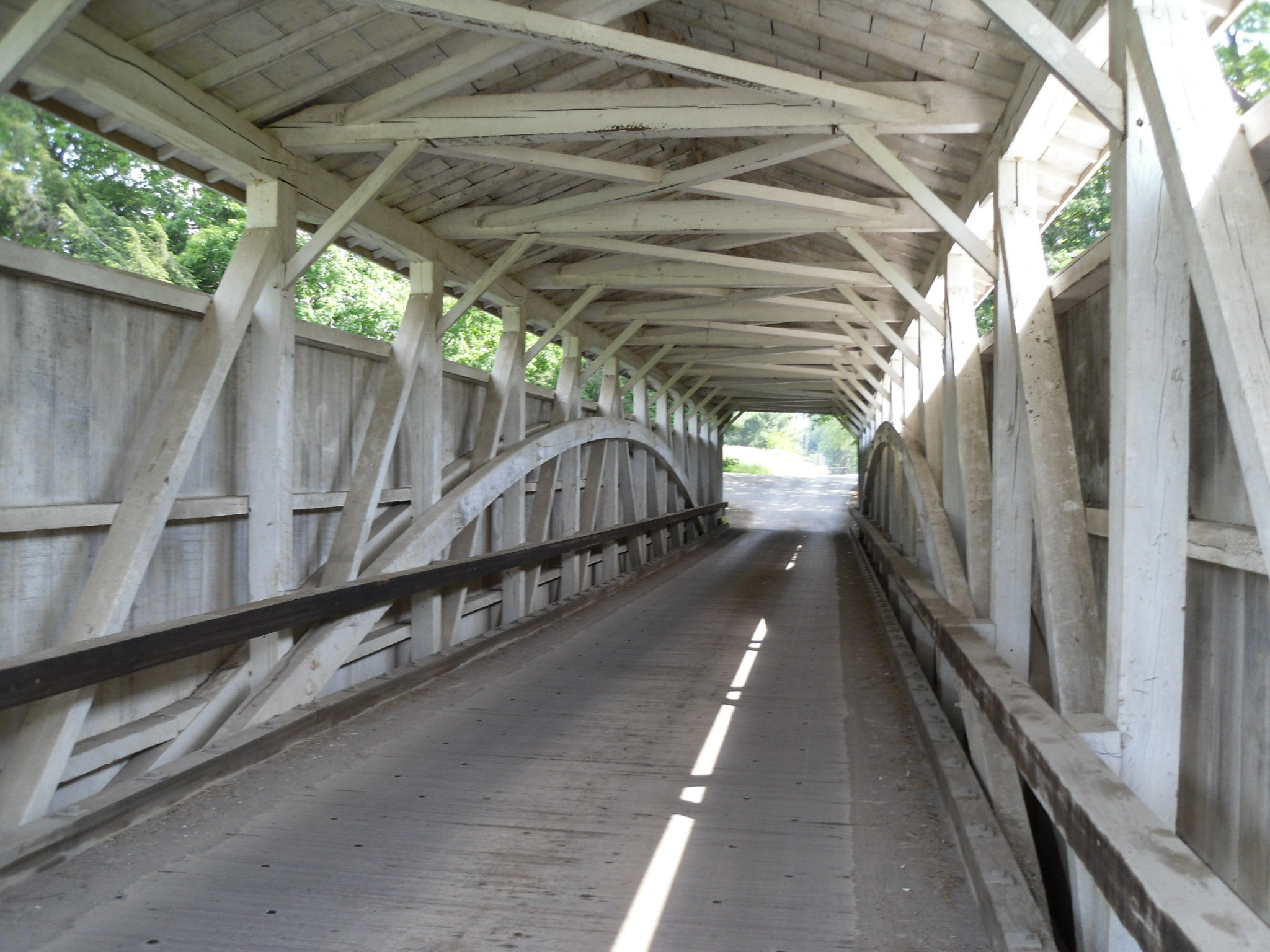

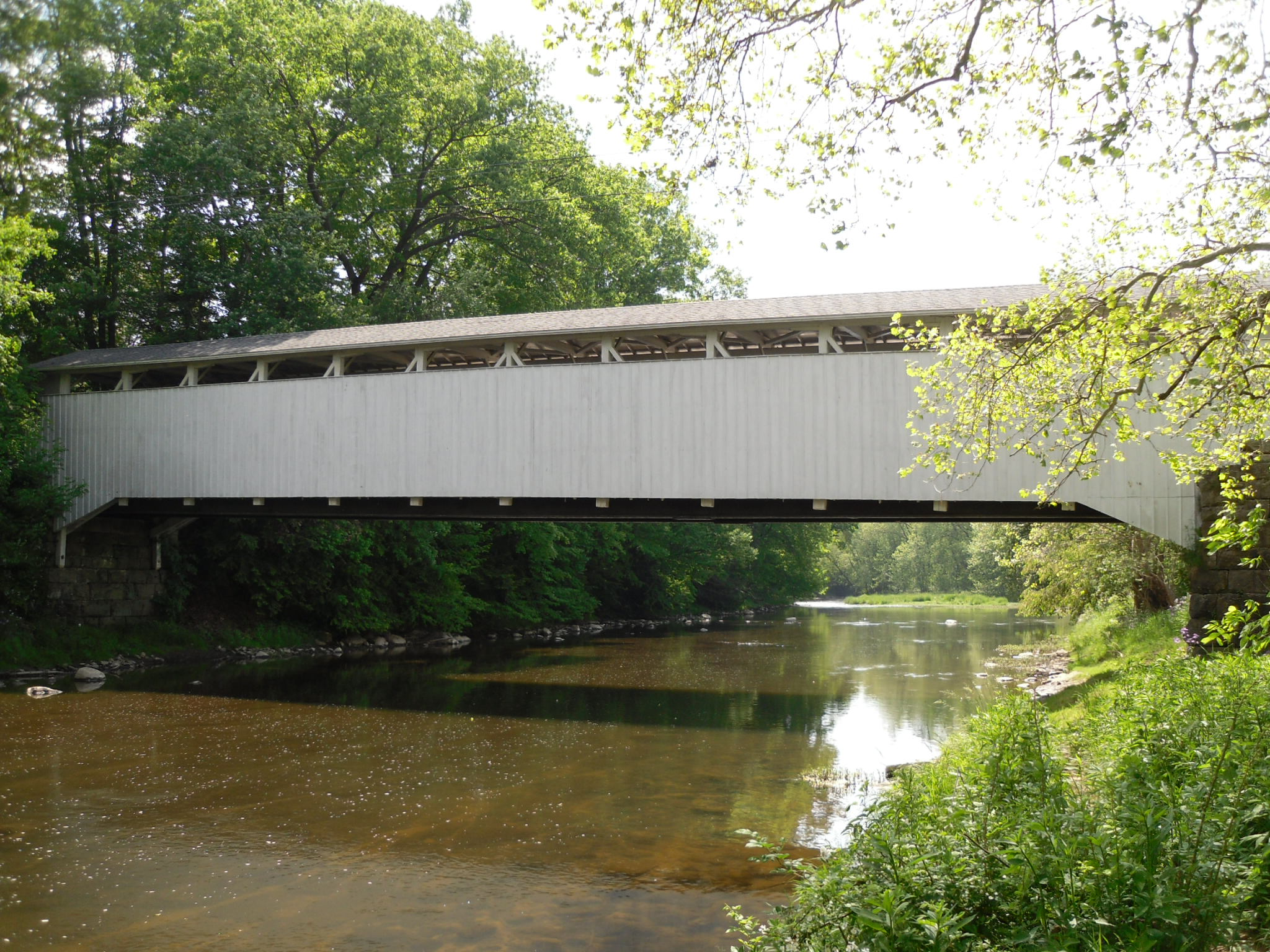

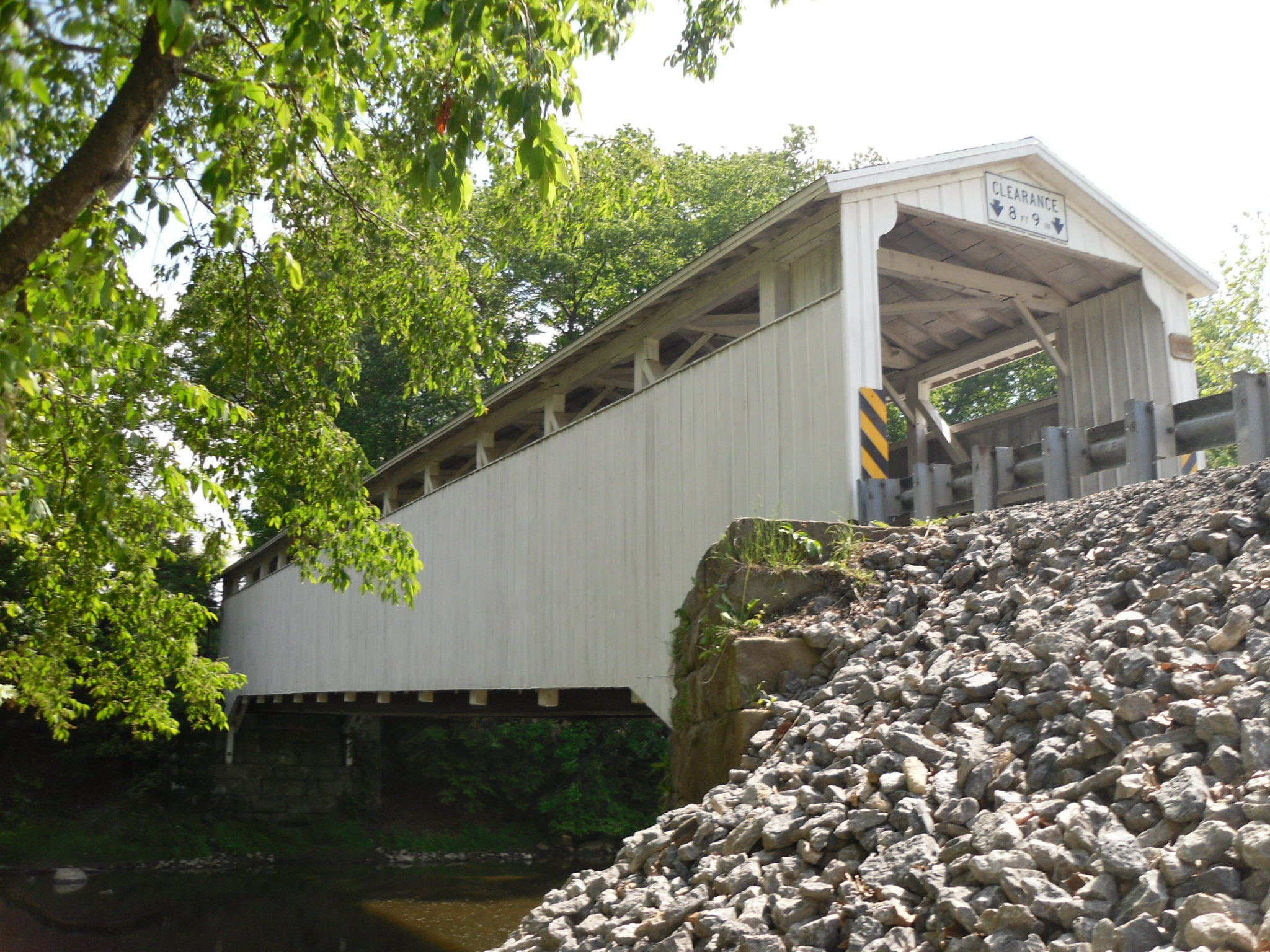
