= Indian Run (Neshannock Creek tributary) =

River in Pennsylvania

Indian Run Tributary to Neshannock Creek
- Location of Indian Run mouth Indian Run (Neshannock Creek tributary) (the United States)

Location
- Country: United States of America
- State: Pennsylvania
- County: Mercer
- Townships: Springfield; Lackawannock

Physical characteristics
- Source: divide between Indian Run and Little Neshannock Creek
  - location: about 1.5 miles southwest of Hoagland, Pennsylvania
  - coordinates: 41°11′28″N 080°17′19″W
  - elevation: 1,240 ft (380 m)
- Mouth: Neshannock Creek
  - location: Leesburg, Pennsylvania
  - coordinates: 41°08′37″N 080°14′23″W
  - elevation: 1,030 ft (310 m)
- Length: 5.06 mi (8.14 km)
- Basin size: 6.84 square miles (17.7 km^{2})
- Discharge
  - average: 9.86 cu ft/s (0.279 m^{3}/s) at mouth with Neshannock Creek

Basin features
- Progression: Neshannock Creek → Shenango River → Beaver River → Ohio River → Mississippi River → Gulf of Mexico
- River system: Beaver River
- Tributaries
  - left: unnamed tributaries
  - right: unnamed tributaries

Indian Run is a tributary to Neshannock Creek in western Pennsylvania. The stream rises in south-central Mercer County and flows southeast entering Neshannock Creek at Leesburg, Pennsylvania. The watershed is roughly 61% agricultural, 32% forested and the rest is other uses.
