= Mill Run (Neshannock Creek tributary) =

River in Pennsylvania

Mill Run Tributary to Neshannock Creek
- Location of Mill Run mouth Mill Run (Neshannock Creek tributary) (the United States)

Location
- Country: United States of America
- State: Pennsylvania
- County: Mercer
- Township: Springfield

Physical characteristics
- Source: wetland at divide between Mill Run and Wolf Creek
  - location: about 0.5 miles southeast of Blacktown, Pennsylvania
  - coordinates: 41°09′21″N 080°09′37″W
  - elevation: 1,270 ft (390 m)
- Mouth: Neshannock Creek
  - location: about 0.25 miles southeast of Milburn, Pennsylvania
  - coordinates: 41°09′53″N 080°13′28″W
  - elevation: 1,048 ft (319 m)
- Length: 4.69 mi (7.55 km)
- Basin size: 5.01 square miles (13.0 km^{2})
- Discharge
  - location: near Milburn, Pennsylvania
  - average: 7.54 cu ft/s (0.214 m^{3}/s) at mouth with Neshannock Creek

Basin features
- Progression: Neshannock Creek → Shenango River → Beaver River → Ohio River → Mississippi River → Gulf of Mexico
- River system: Beaver River
- Tributaries
  - left: unnamed tributaries
  - right: unnamed tributaries

Mill Run is a tributary to Neshannock Creek in western Pennsylvania. The stream rises in southeastern Mercer County and flows generally northwest entering Neshannock Creek near Milburn, Pennsylvania. Mill Run watershed is roughly 36% agricultural, 56% forested and the rest is other uses.
