= Mill Run, Pennsylvania =

There are several streams and communities in the U.S. state of Pennsylvania named Mill Run, including:

- Mill Run (Neshannock Creek tributary), in Mercer County
- Mill Run (Susquehanna River tributary), in Wyoming County
- Mill Run, Blair County, Pennsylvania, census-designated place
- Mill Run, Fayette County, Pennsylvania, closest settlement to Frank Lloyd Wright's Fallingwater
