= Beaver Run (Neshannock Creek tributary) =

River in Pennsylvania

Beaver Run Tributary to Neshannock Creek
- Location of Beaver Run mouth Beaver Run (Neshannock Creek tributary) (the United States)

Location
- Country: United States of America
- State: Pennsylvania
- County: Mercer
- Township: East Lackawannock

Physical characteristics
- Source: divide between Beaver Run and Shenango River (Lackawannock Creek)
  - location: about 1.5 miles southwest of Mercer, Pennsylvania
  - coordinates: 41°12′37″N 080°16′36″W
  - elevation: 1,220 ft (370 m)
- Mouth: Neshannock Creek
  - location: about 1 mile south of Mercer, Pennsylvania
  - coordinates: 41°12′04″N 080°13′55″W
  - elevation: 1,060 ft (320 m)
- Length: 2.78 mi (4.47 km)
- Basin size: 3.71 square miles (9.6 km^{2})
- Discharge
  - average: 5.62 cu ft/s (0.159 m^{3}/s) at mouth with Neshannock Creek

Basin features
- Progression: Neshannock Creek → Shenango River → Beaver River → Ohio River → Mississippi River → Gulf of Mexico
- River system: Beaver River
- Tributaries
  - left: unnamed tributaries
  - right: unnamed tributaries

Pine Run is a tributary to Neshannock Creek in western Pennsylvania. The stream rises in south-central Mercer County and flows southeast entering Neshannock Creek south and downstream of Mercer, Pennsylvania. The watershed is roughly 46% agricultural, 45% forested and the rest is other uses.
