= Little Neshannock Creek =

Stream in Pennsylvania, USA

Little Neshannock Creek Tributary to Neshannock Creek
- Location of Little Neshannock Creek mouth Little Neshannock Creek (the United States)

Location
- Country: United States
- State: Pennsylvania
- Counties: Lawrence; Mercer

Physical characteristics
- Source: divide between Little Neshannock Creek and Shenango River
  - location: Jefferson Township, Pennsylvania
  - coordinates: 41°15′01″N 080°19′17″W
  - elevation: 1,220 ft (370 m)
- Mouth: Neshannock Creek
  - location: Mayville, Pennsylvania
  - coordinates: 41°05′13″N 080°19′00″W
  - elevation: 925 ft (282 m)
- Length: 13.32 mi (21.44 km)
- Basin size: 50.65 square miles (131.2 km^{2})
- Discharge
  - location: Neshannock Creek
  - average: 63.91 cu ft/s (1.810 m^{3}/s) at mouth with Neshannock Creek

Basin features
- Progression: Neshannock Creek → Shenango River → Beaver River → Ohio River → Mississippi River → Gulf of Mexico
- River system: Shenango River
- Tributaries
  - left: unnamed tributaries
  - right: West Branch

Little Neshannock Creek is a 13.32 mi (21.44 km) long tributary to Neshannock Creek in Lawrence County that rises in Mercer County. This creek drains several glacial wetlands and the Borough of New Wilmington, Pennsylvania.
