= Pymatuning Creek =

Stream in Pennsylvania, USA

Pymatuning Creek Tributary to Shenango River
- Location of Pymatuning Creek mouth Pymatuning Creek (the United States)

Location
- Country: United States
- State: Pennsylvania; Ohio
- Counties: Mercer (PA); Ashtabula (OH); Trumbull (OH)

Physical characteristics
- Source: divide between Pymatuning Creek and Grand River
  - location: Leon, Ohio
  - coordinates: 41°39′03″N 080°36′33″W
  - elevation: 1,100 ft (340 m)
- Mouth: Shenango River (Shenango Lake)
  - location: Shenango Lake in South Pymatuning Township
  - coordinates: 41°17′40″N 080°27′26″W
  - elevation: 896 ft (273 m)
- Length: 36.22 mi (58.29 km)
- Basin size: 173.82 square miles (450.2 km^{2})
- Discharge
  - location: Shenango River (Shenango River Lake)
  - average: 223.36 cu ft/s (6.325 m^{3}/s) at mouth with Shenango River (Shenango Lake)

Basin features
- Progression: South
- River system: Shenango River
- Population: 724 (2010)
- Tributaries
  - left: Stratton Creek; Booth Run; Chestnut Run
  - right: Clear Creek; Sugar Creek; Mill Creek
- Waterbodies: Shenango Lake

Pymatuning Creek is a 36.22 mi (58.29 km) long tributary to Shenango River Lake that rises in Ashtabula County, Ohio and flows south into Shenango Lake in Mercer County, Pennsylvania. Pymatuning Creek forms most of the western side of Shenango Lake. Pymatuning Creek has been designated as a Wild & Scenic River in Ohio.
