= Wilmington Area School District =

School district in Pennsylvania, United States

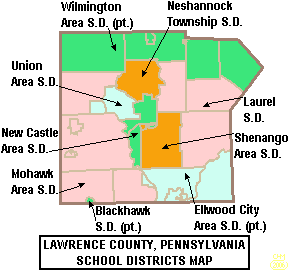

Address
- 300 Wood Street New Wilmington, Pennsylvania, 16142; United States

District information
- Type: Public
- Grades: K–12
- NCES District ID: 4226520

Students and staff
- Students: 1,030
- Teachers: 81.0 (FTE)
- Staff: 63.0 (FTE)
- Student–teacher ratio: 12.72

Other information
- Website: www.wasd.school

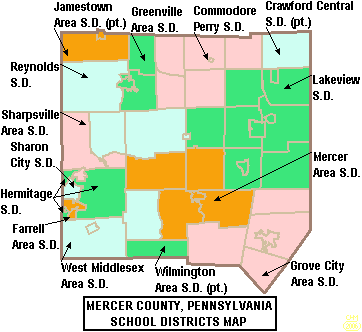
Wilmington Area School District region in Mercer County

Wilmington Area School District is a public school district located in Lawrence County, Pennsylvania and Mercer County, Pennsylvania. The district serves the boroughs of New Wilmington and Volant plus Pulaski, Wilmington, Washington, and Plain Grove Townships in Lawrence County. Wilmington Township in Mercer County is also served. The school district features one elementary school in New Wilmington, a middle school, and Wilmington Area High School.

Wilmington's high school football team became the first in the county to win a state championship in the 2008 season. Its boys track team was also named state champion in 2008.
