= Harlansburg, Pennsylvania =

Unincorporated community in Pennsylvania, US

- Unincorporated community
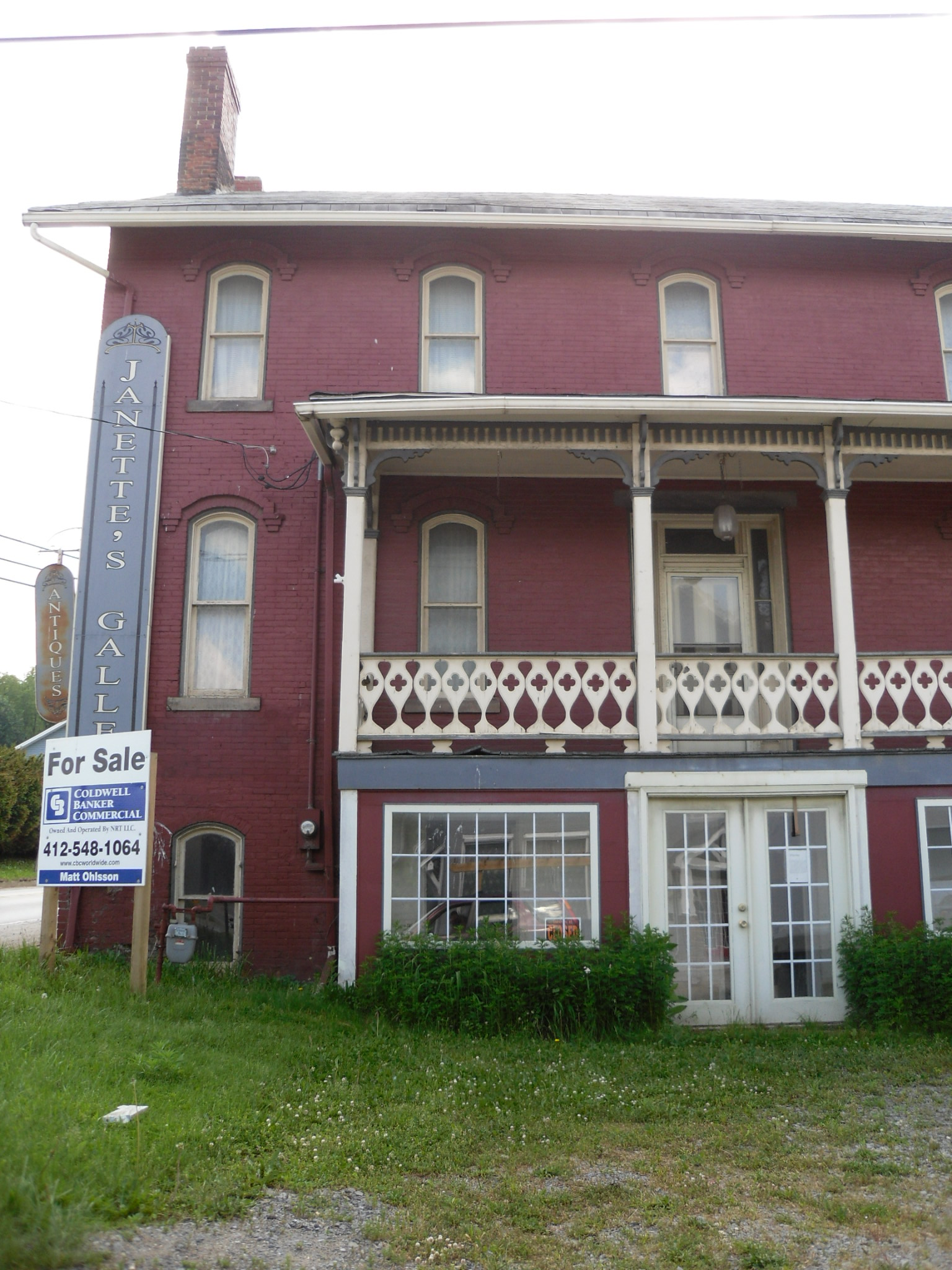

- Location in Pennsylvania Location in the United States
- Coordinates: 41°01′27″N 80°11′19″W
- Country: United States
- State: Pennsylvania
- County: Lawrence
- Township: Scott
- Time zone: UTC-5 (Eastern (EST))
  - Summer (DST): UTC-4 (EDT)

Harlansburg is an unincorporated community located in Scott Township, Lawrence County, Pennsylvania, United States approximately 8 miles (13 km) east of the city of New Castle.

The community is the home of the Harlansburg Station Transportation Museum and the Harlansburg cave, reputedly the longest cave in Pennsylvania.

== History ==
The first settler was Jonathan Harlan, who left Chester County in 1792, and came to Allegheny County, locating in Chartiers Valley. He came to what is now called Scott Township, about 1797 or 1798, and settled 400 acres (1.6 km^{2}) under Dr. Peter Mowry, of Pittsburgh, including the site of the village. While living on his first tract, he laid out the town of Harlansburg in 1800.

Another early settler was the Hunt family. Abraham and Levi Hunt founded a settlement on a farm adjoining the Harlan family, and Abraham, in 1802, built the first tavern in the village, the building still standing to this day, known as the "Benard House." A post office was established in the village, circa 1811 or 1812, and Elder was appointed the first postmaster.

A log school house was erected about 1820, and the first teacher was an Irish immigrant named David Gourley.

A hewn log church was built by some German families as early as 1799. Among the churches next in age is the Methodist Episcopal Church, which was originated in 1834.

== Demographics ==
Historical population
Census	Pop.	Note	%±

The United States Census Bureau defined Harlansburg as a census designated place (CDP) in 2023.
