= Johnston's Tavern =

- U.S. National Register of Historic Places
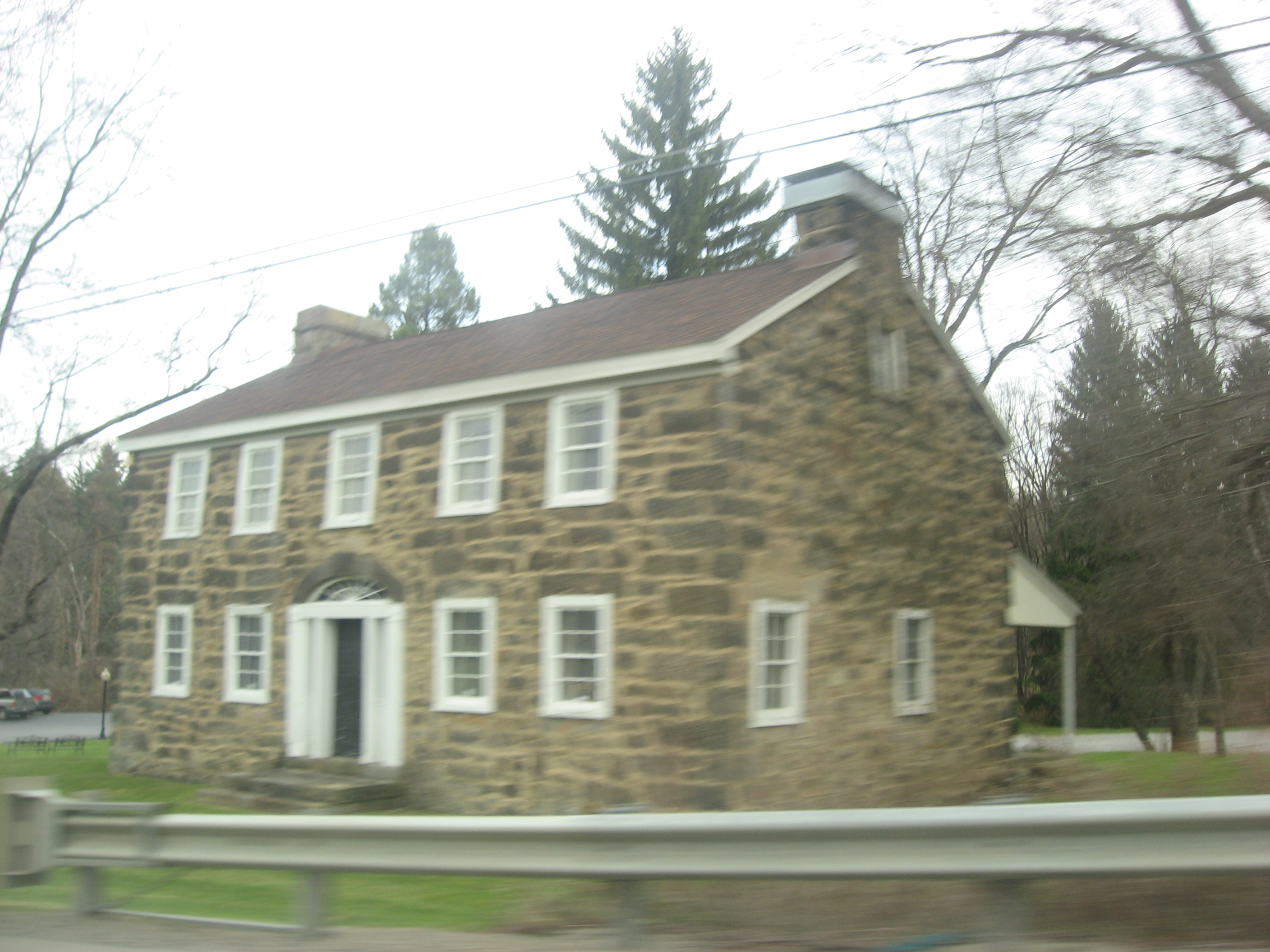
- Roadside view of the tavern

- Location within Pennsylvania Location within the United States
- Location: 6 miles (9.7 km) south of Mercer on U.S. Route 19, Springfield Township, Mercer County, Pennsylvania
- Coordinates: 41°9′0″N 80°13′23″W
- Area: 16.3 acres (6.6 ha)
- Built: 1831
- Architectural style: Greek Revival
- NRHP reference No.: 72001136
- Added to NRHP: March 24, 1972

Johnston's Tavern, also known as the New Lodge Inn, is an historic inn and tavern in Springfield Township, Mercer County, Pennsylvania, United States.

It was added to the National Register of Historic Places in 1972.

== History and architectural features ==
Built in 1831, this historic structure is a two-story, five-bay-wide, fieldstone building with Greek Revival-style design details. It was one of the main stagecoach stops on the Pittsburgh-Erie Turnpike. The tavern was a stop on the Underground Railroad.
