= Linesville Creek (Shenango River tributary) =

Tributary to Shenango River in Crawford County, Pennsylvania

Linesville Creek Tributary to Shenango River
- Location within Pennsylvania Location within the United States

Location
- Country: United States
- State: Pennsylvania
- County: Crawford
- Townships: Pine; Conneaut
- Borough: Linesville

Physical characteristics
- Source: divide between Linesville Creek and Conneaut Creek
  - location: about 1 mile north of Center Road, Pennsylvania
  - coordinates: 41°43′25″N 080°24′45″W
  - elevation: 1,140 ft (350 m)
- Mouth: Pymatuning Lake
  - location: Linesville, Pennsylvania
  - coordinates: 41°38′53″N 080°25′08″W
  - elevation: 1,010 ft (310 m)
- Length: 6.01 mi (9.67 km)
- Basin size: 9.86 square miles (25.5 km^{2})
- Discharge
  - average: 14.60 cu ft/s (0.413 m^{3}/s) at mouth with Pymatuning Reservoir (Shenango River)

Basin features
- Progression: south
- River system: Shenango River
- Tributaries
  - left: unnamed tributaries
  - right: unnamed tributaries

Linesville Creek is a 9.86 square miles (25.5 km^{2}) long tributary to Shenango River and Pymatuning Reservoir in Crawford County, Pennsylvania. The watershed is 41% forested, 54% agricultural and the rest is other uses.

== See also ==
- List of rivers of Pennsylvania
