= Laurel School District (Pennsylvania) =

School district in Pennsylvania

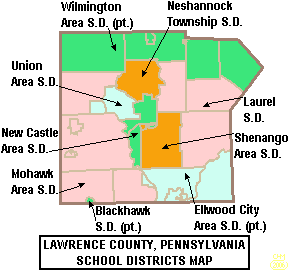

Address
- 2497 Harlansburg Road New Castle, Pennsylvania, 16101-9705; United States

District information
- Type: Public
- Budget: $16,540,146 (2012-13)

Other information
- Website: www.laurelspartans.com

Laurel School District is a small, rural, public school district that is located in Lawrence County, Pennsylvania. It encompasses approximately sixty-six square miles.

Scott Township, Slippery Rock Township, and Hickory Township are within district boundaries. According to 2010 federal census data, it serves a resident population of 8,107.

== History and notable features ==
In 2009, the district residents’ per capita income was $17,192, while the median family income was $46,306. In the Commonwealth, the median family income was $49,501 and the United States median family income was $49,445, in 2010.

Laurel School District operates one elementary school and a combined junior–senior high school.

== Extracurriculars ==
The Laurel School District offers a wide variety of clubs, activities and an extensive sports program.

=== Sports ===
The District funds:

Boys

- Baseball - V, 9th AA
- Basketball - V, 9th AA
- Cross Country - AA
- Football - V, 9th A
- Golf - AA
- Track and Field - AA
- Wrestling - AA

Girls

- Basketball - V, 9th AA
- Cross Country - AAA
- Golf - AA
- Softball - V, 9th AA
- Track and Field - AA
- Volleyball - A

Junior High School Sports

Boys

- Basketball
- Cross Country
- Football
- Track and Field
- Wrestling

Girls

- Basketball
- Cross Country
- Track and Field
- Volleyball

According to PIAA directory July 2012
