= Beaverdam Run =

Creek in Pennsylvania, United States

Coordinates: 40.8495°N 75.7094°W

Beaverdam Run (also known as Beaver Run) is a short creek draining the east slopes of the Mahoning Hills, and a right bank tributary of the Lehigh River. The creek's banks are one of the two most likely valleys that pack animals traversed to reach boats on the river so the Anthracite from the earliest coal mining activity in Carbon County, Pennsylvania was transshipped onto boats on the river.
