= Shenango River Lake =

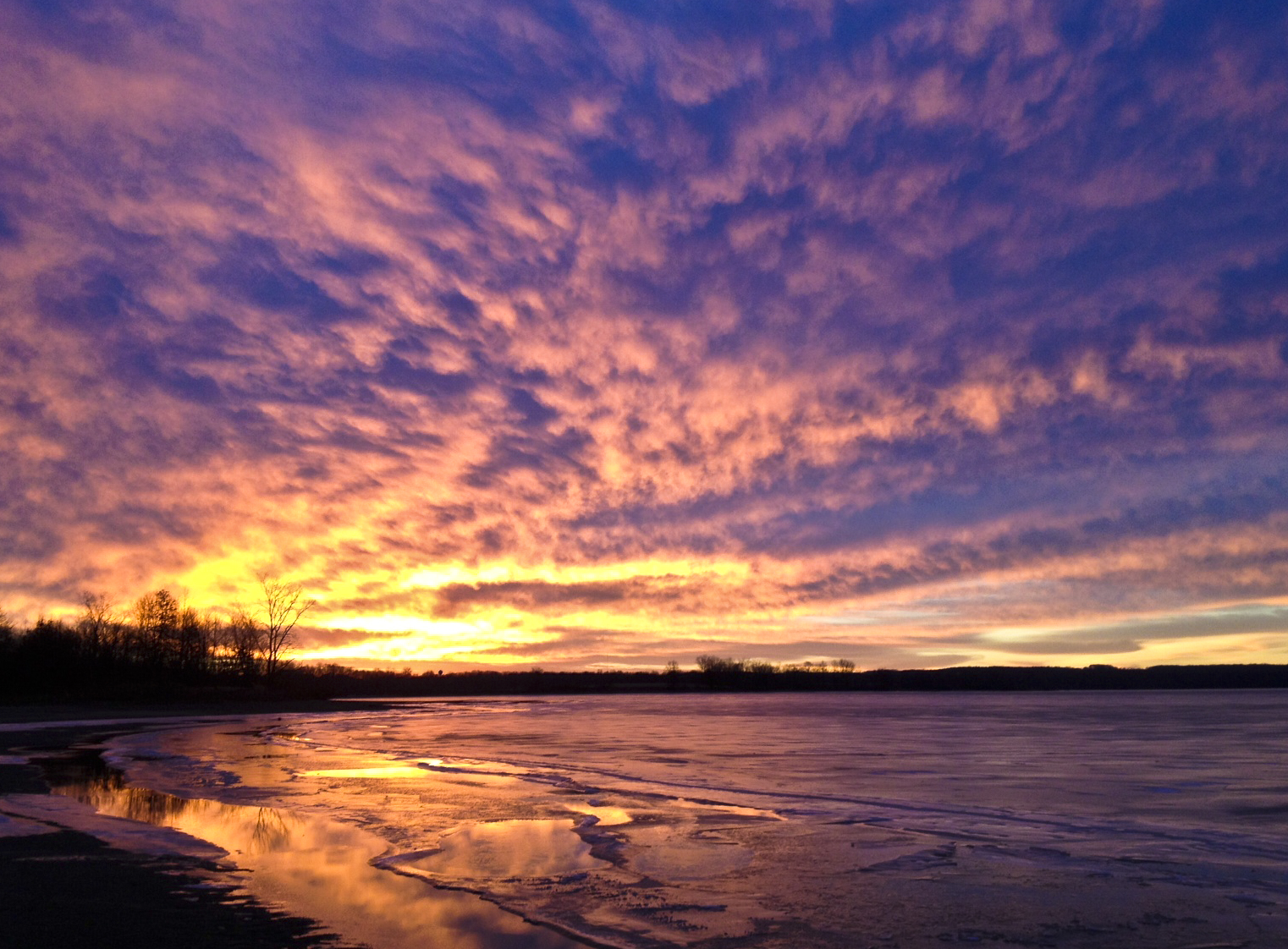
- Dawn at Shenango River Lake, January 2014

- Location within Ohio Location within Pennsylvania Location within the United States
- Location: Mercer County, Pennsylvania / Trumbull County, Ohio, US
- Coordinates: 41°15′55″N 80°27′41″W
- Type: reservoir
- Primary inflows: Shenango River
- Primary outflows: Shenango River
- Basin countries: United States
- Surface area: 3,560 acres (1,440 ha)
- Surface elevation: 892 ft (272 m)

Shenango River Lake is a reservoir in the Shenango River Valley of western Pennsylvania and northeastern Ohio. Authorized by the Flood Control Acts of 1938, the lake is one of 16 flood control projects in the Pittsburgh District designed to prevent flooding. It is a popular site among anglers and is lined by 330 campsites.The campground also hosts a Geodesic dome green house that is used to propagate native species and help pollinator dependent species. Shenango River lake offers a variety of outdoor activities. Such as waterfowl and birdwatching, boating, hunting, Canoeing, Kayaking, and other various water activities.

The concrete Shenango Dam (National ID # PA00111) was completed in 1965, at a height of 68 feet (21 m) and a length of 720 feet (220 m) at its crest, as a flood control project of the United States Army Corps of Engineers. The reservoir has a maximum capacity of 351,000 acre-feet (433,000,000 m^{3}), and a normal capacity of 29,920 acre-feet (36,910,000 m^{3}).
