= East Lackawannock Township, Mercer County, Pennsylvania =

Township in Pennsylvania, US

- Township
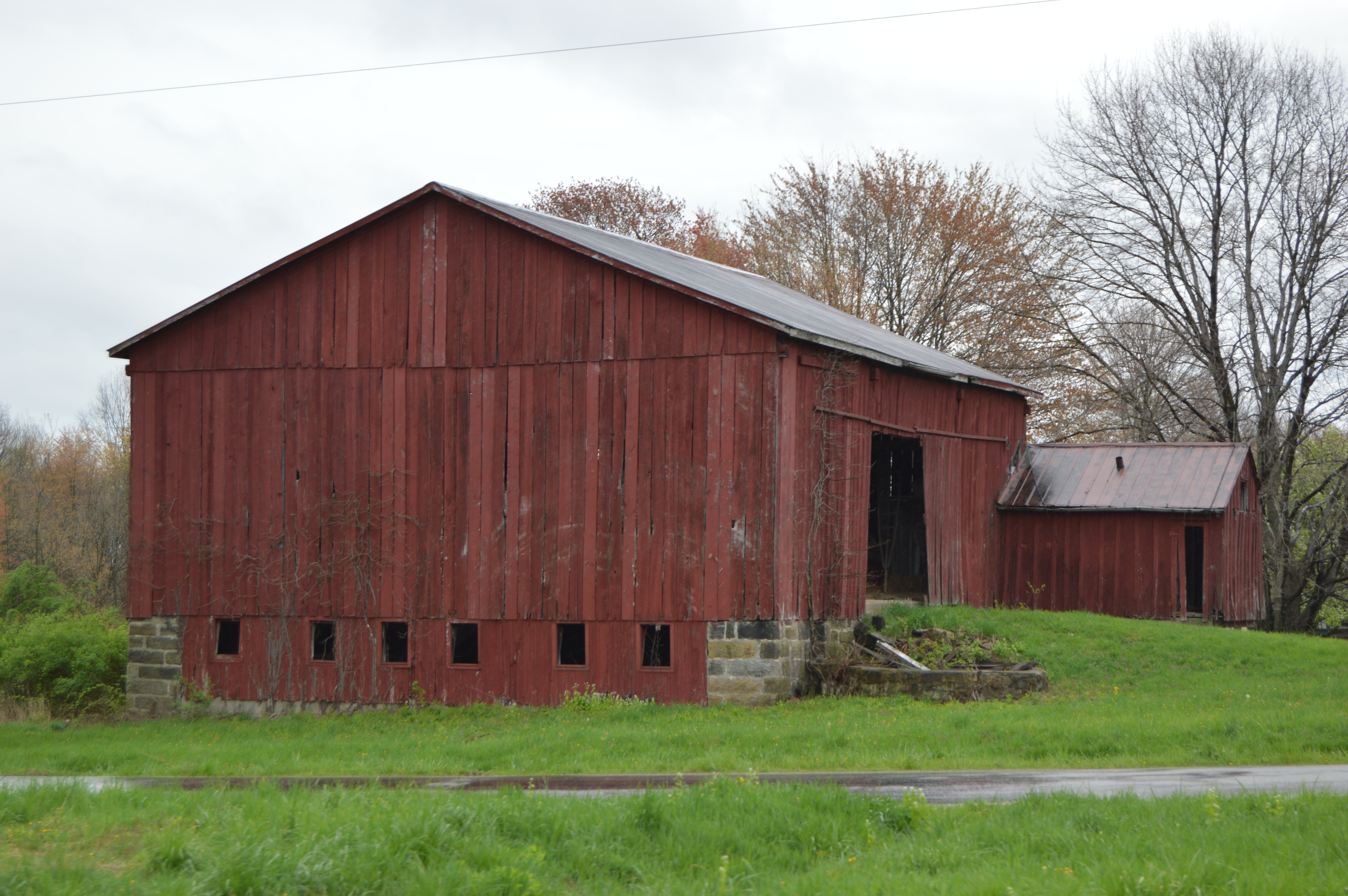
- Barn on Vickerman Road

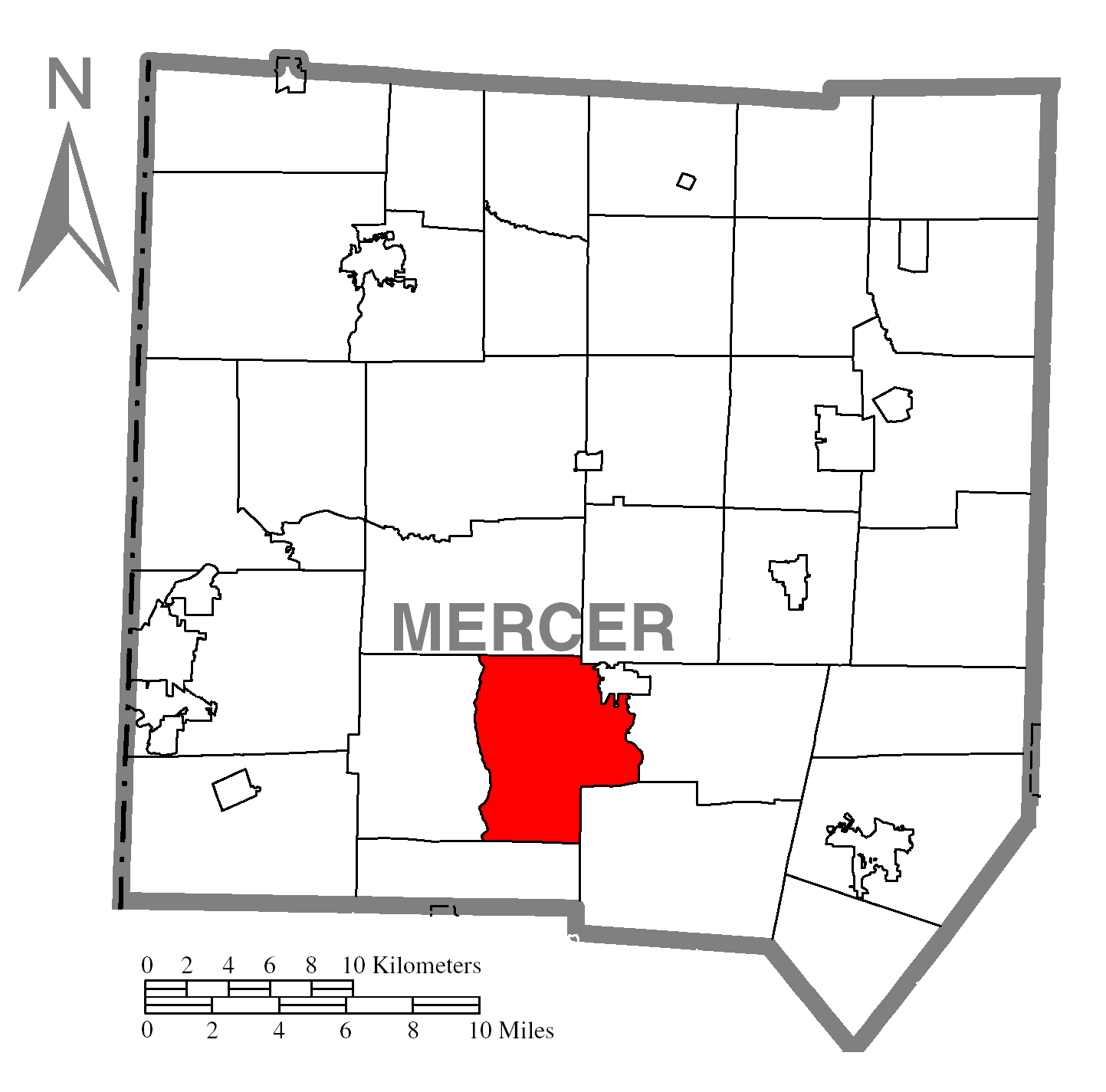
- Location of East Lackawannock Township in Mercer County

- Location of Mercer County in Pennsylvania
- Coordinates: 41°12′0″N 80°16′59″W
- Country: United States
- State: Pennsylvania
- County: Mercer

Area
  - Total: 21.42 sq mi (55.48 km^{2})
  - Land: 21.41 sq mi (55.44 km^{2})
  - Water: 0.015 sq mi (0.04 km^{2})

Population (2020)
  - Total: 1,670
  - Estimate (2023): 1,651
  - Density: 77.0/sq mi (29.73/km^{2})
- Time zone: UTC-4 (EST)
  - Summer (DST): UTC-5 (EDT)
- Area code: 724
- FIPS code: 42-085-21336

Historical population
Census	Pop.	Note	%±
2000	1,701		—
2010	1,682		−1.1%
2020	1,670		−0.7%
2023 (est.)	1,651		−1.1%
U.S. Decennial Census

East Lackawannock Township is a township in Mercer County, Pennsylvania, United States. The population was 1,666 at the 2020 census, a decline from the figure of 1,682 in 2010.

== Geography ==
According to the United States Census Bureau, the township has a total area of 21.2 square miles (55 km^{2}), of which 21.2 square miles (55 km^{2}) is land and 0.04 square miles (0.10 km^{2}) (0.09%) is water.

== Demographics ==
As of the census of 2000, there were 1,701 people, 584 households, and 460 families residing in the township. The population density was 80.2 inhabitants per square mile (31.0/km^{2}). There were 599 housing units at an average density of 28.2 per square mile (10.9/km^{2}). The racial makeup of the township was 97.18% White, 1.18% African American, 0.06% Native American, 0.29% Asian, 0.29% from other races, and 1.00% from two or more races. Hispanic or Latino of any race were 0.94% of the population.

There were 584 households, out of which 32.5% had children under the age of 18 living with them, 70.0% were married couples living together, 5.3% had a female householder with no husband present, and 21.1% were non-families. 17.3% of all households were made up of individuals, and 8.9% had someone living alone who was 65 years of age or older. The average household size was 2.77 and the average family size was 3.15.

In the township the population was spread out, with 26.6% under the age of 18, 4.5% from 18 to 24, 25.2% from 25 to 44, 26.3% from 45 to 64, and 17.4% who were 65 years of age or older. The median age was 40 years. For every 100 females there were 93.7 males. For every 100 females age 18 and over, there were 93.8 males.

The median income for a household in the township was $41,250, and the median income for a family was $44,948. Males had a median income of $35,489 versus $21,731 for females. The per capita income for the township was $16,589. About 9.2% of families and 15.0% of the population were below the poverty line, including 28.8% of those under age 18 and 10.6% of those age 65 or over.
