= Volant, Pennsylvania =

Borough in Pennsylvania, US

- Borough
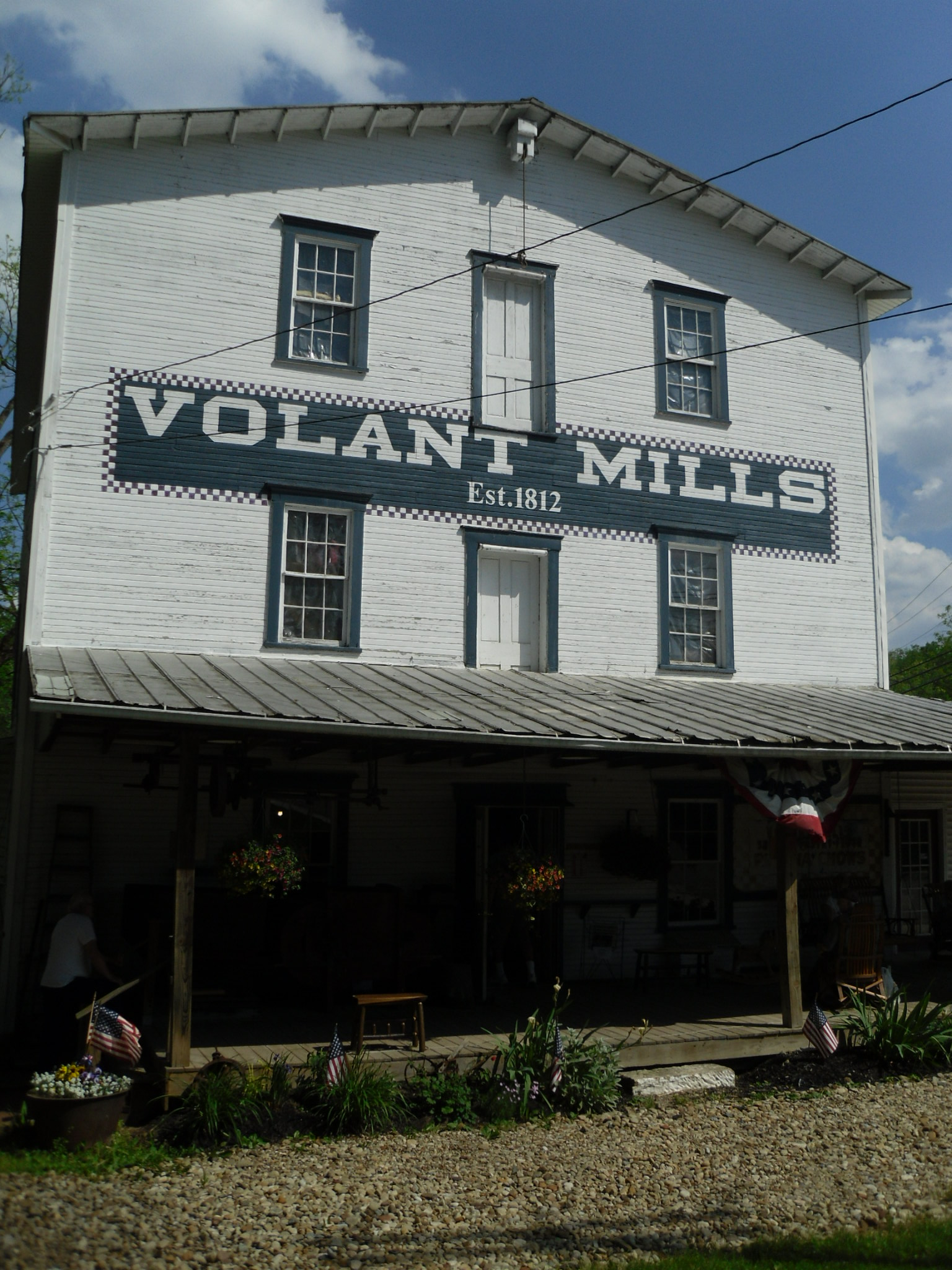
- Volant Mills

- Location in Lawrence County, Pennsylvania
- Coordinates: 41°6′52″N 80°15′34″W
- Country: United States
- State: Pennsylvania
- County: Lawrence
- Established: 1868

Government
  - Mayor: Arnold Hodge

Area
  - Total: 0.12 sq mi (0.31 km^{2})
  - Land: 0.11 sq mi (0.29 km^{2})
  - Water: 0.0077 sq mi (0.02 km^{2})
- Elevation (middle of borough): 1,050 ft (320 m)
- Highest elevation (northwest end of borough): 1,160 ft (350 m)
- Lowest elevation (Neshannock Creek): 1,000 ft (300 m)

Population (2020)
  - Total: 127 ▼
  - Estimate (2021): 126
  - Density: 1,344.2/sq mi (518.98/km^{2})
- Time zone: UTC-4 (EST)
  - Summer (DST): UTC-5 (EDT)
- Area code: 724
- FIPS code: 42-80368

Volant is a borough in northern Lawrence County, Pennsylvania, United States. The population was 127 at the 2020 census. Volant is surrounded by Old Order Amish farms of the New Wilmington settlement. It is part of the Pittsburgh metropolitan area.

== History ==
The land on which the borough of Volant is situated was bought from Native Americans in 1784. The first gristmill was built on Neshannock Creek in 1806, upstream from the current site. It was abandoned after a few years, and a new mill was built in 1812.

In 1847, an Amish settlement was established between New Wilmington and Volant. In 1868, J.P. Locke purchased the mill and 100 acres (0.40 km^{2}) of land and began laying out a settlement of 30 lots, which he called Lockeville. With the help of the railroad, his attempts to create a settlement were successful.

In 1874, in amazement hunters exclaimed "volant!" as ducks took flight from a local pond. The Latin meaning of volant is "they fly." The name stuck, and in June 1893, the settlement changed its name to Volant and it was incorporated as such.

The first store was built in 1877 by John and William Graham. By the turn of the 20th century the village turned into a commercial community. Thanks to the New Castle-Franklin railroad, Volant became a shopping district. The mill remained the nucleus of the town. Because of Volant's rural location, there was a livery stable, two harness shops, a blacksmith, and a veterinarian. There was also a college which attracted students from the surrounding communities. As the town progressed toward establishing larger business ventures, a stone quarry was set up around 1900, along with a lumber mill and brick company. The growing need for petroleum spurred an oil boom north of Volant. The drilling continued until the beginning of World War I.

With the Great Depression came a gradual decline of the economy. The mill, which was the prime source of Volant's economy, closed its doors in the early 1960s, and the trains stopped running through Volant in 1975.

In 1984 the mill reopened for the first time in over 20 years as a country gift and antique store. Encouraged by its success, other shops were opened on Main Street. There are over 50 shops and restaurants, turning Volant into one of western Pennsylvania's tourist attractions.

== Geography ==
Volant is located at 41°6′52″N 80°15′34″W (41.114489, -80.259463).

According to the United States Census Bureau, the borough has a total area of 0.1 square miles (0.26 km^{2}), all land.

Volant is located on Pennsylvania Route 208, 10 minutes from I-79 and I-80. It has an old-fashioned main street nestled in the hills of western Pennsylvania Amish country.

Volant shares its northern, southern and western borders with Wilmington Township and the eastern, northeastern and southeastern borders with Washington Township.

== Demographics ==
Historical population
Census	Pop.	Note	%±
1900	120		—
1910	185		54.2%
1920	211		14.1%
1930	186		−11.8%
1940	237		27.4%
1950	229		−3.4%
1960	213		−7.0%
1970	226		6.1%
1980	203		−10.2%
1990	152		−25.1%
2000	113		−25.7%
2010	168		48.7%
2020	126		−25.0%
2021 (est.)	126	Steady	0.0%

According to the census of 2000, there were 113 people, 55 households, and 37 families residing in the borough. The population density was 991.3 inhabitants per square mile (382.7/km^{2}). There were 64 housing units at an average density of 561.5 per square mile (216.8/km^{2}). The racial makeup of the borough was 100% White.

There were 55 households, out of which 20.0% had children under the age of 18 living with them, 49.1% were married couples living together, 10.9% had a female householder with no husband present, and 32.7% were non-families. 29.1% of all households were made up of individuals, and 12.7% had someone living alone who was 65 years of age or older. The average household size was 2.05 and the average family size was 2.49.

In the borough the population was spread out, with 15.9% under the age of 18, 8.0% from 18 to 24, 23.9% from 25 to 44, 30.1% from 45 to 64, and 22.1% who were 65 years of age or older. The median age was 46 years. For every 100 females there were 88.3 males. For every 100 females age 18 and over, there were 75.9 males.

The median income for a household in the borough was $30,625, and the median income for a family was $37,917. Males had a median income of $38,750 versus $25,417 for females. The per capita income for the borough was $17,642. There were 6.1% of families and 7.9% of the population living below the poverty line, including 12.5% of those under 18 and 7.1% of those over 64.

Volant is surrounded by farms of the New Wilmington Amish settlement which had 19 congregation i.e. about 2,500 people in 2013.

== Education ==
The Wilmington Area School District serves the borough.

== Transportation ==
=== Major roads and highways ===
- PA 168
- PA 208
