= Mayville, Pennsylvania =

Mayville
- Unincorporated community
- Location within the state of Pennsylvania Mayville (the United States)
- Coordinates: 41°5′14″N 80°18′44″W
- Country: United States
- State: Pennsylvania
- County: Lawrence
- Township: Wilmington Township
- Elevation: 932 ft (284 m)
- Time zone: UTC-5 (Eastern (EST))
  - Summer (DST): UTC-4 (EDT)
- GNIS feature ID: 1180588

Mayville is an unincorporated community located within Wilmington Township, Lawrence County, Pennsylvania, United States.
