= Beaver Run (Walhonding River tributary) =

Stream in Coshocton County, Ohio, U.S.

Coordinates: 40°19′55″N 82°00′01″W

Beaver Run is a stream in Coshocton County, in the U.S. state of Ohio.

Beaver Run was named after Beaver County, Pennsylvania, the native home of a first settler.

== See also ==
- List of rivers of Ohio
