= New Wilmington, Pennsylvania =

Borough in Pennsylvania, US

- Borough
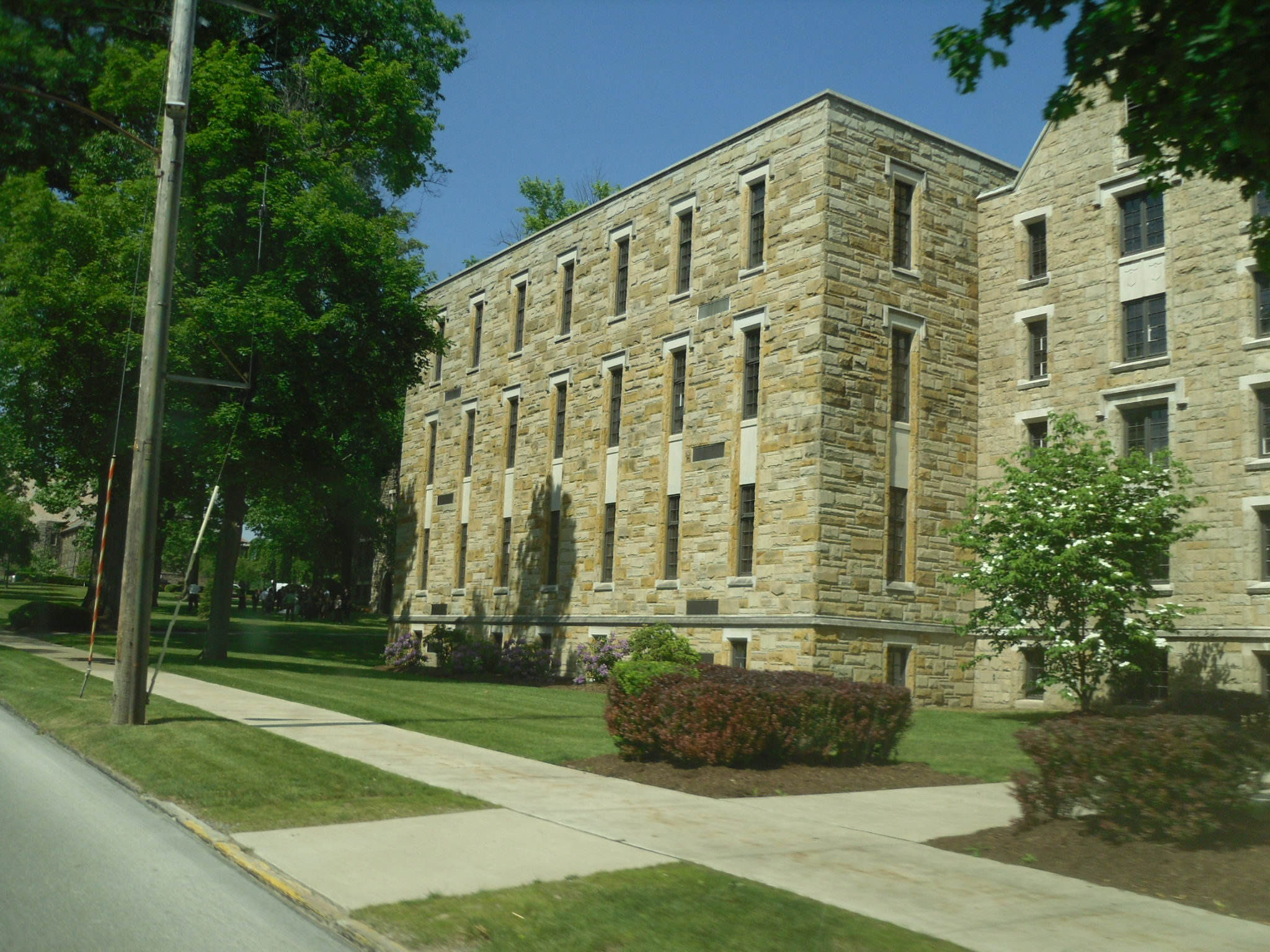
- Westminster College

- Location in Lawrence County, Pennsylvania
- Coordinates: 41°7′15″N 80°19′58″W
- Country: United States
- State: Pennsylvania
- County: Lawrence
- Platted: 1824
- Incorporated: 1863 (half-borough); 1873 (borough)

Government
  - Mayor: Sherie E. Babb

Area
  - Total: 1.09 sq mi (2.82 km^{2})
  - Land: 1.05 sq mi (2.73 km^{2})
  - Water: 0.039 sq mi (0.10 km^{2})
- Elevation: 1,050 ft (320 m)

Population (2020)
  - Total: 2,092
  - Density: 1,985.7/sq mi (766.68/km^{2})
- Time zone: UTC-4 (EST)
  - Summer (DST): UTC-5 (EDT)
- Area codes: 724, 878
- FIPS code: 42-54352
- Website: nwboro.com

New Wilmington is a borough in northern Lawrence County, Pennsylvania, United States. The population was 2,097 at the 2020 census. It was first platted in 1824 and established as a borough in 1863. New Wilmington is home to Westminster College and serves the Old Order Amish community in surrounding Wilmington Township.

== History ==
The town of New Wilmington was established in 1797–1798. In 1824, the first house was built and other buildings were soon erected. In 1847, an Amish settlement was established between New Wilmington and Volant. On April 4, 1863, New Wilmington was established as a half-borough, and on April 9, 1873, it was made a full borough.

== Geography ==
New Wilmington is located at 41°7′15″N 80°19′58″W (41.120713, -80.332807). According to the United States Census Bureau, the borough has a total area of 1.1 square miles (2.8 km^{2}), of which 1.1 square miles (2.8 km^{2}) is land and 0.04 square miles (0.10 km^{2}), or 1.85%, is water. Its highest elevation is 1,190 feet (360 m) in the southeast, and its lowest elevation is 940 feet (290 m) at Little Neshannock Creek. New Wilmington's ZIP code is 16142.

== Demographics ==
Historical population
Census	Pop.	Note	%±
1880	628		—
1890	684		8.9%
1900	791		15.6%
1910	758		−4.2%
1920	886		16.9%
1930	907		2.4%
1940	1,018		12.2%
1950	1,948		91.4%
1960	2,203		13.1%
1970	2,721		23.5%
1980	2,774		1.9%
1990	2,706		−2.5%
2000	2,452		−9.4%
2010	2,466		0.6%
2020	2,092		−15.2%
2021 (est.)	2,091	▼	0.0%

As of the census of 2000, there were 2,452 people, 577 households, and 324 families residing in the borough. The population density was 2,313.2 inhabitants per square mile (893.1/km^{2}). There were 611 housing units at an average density of 576.4 per square mile (222.5/km^{2}). The racial makeup of the borough was 98.21% White, 0.57% African American, 0.20% Native American, 0.45% Asian, 0.24% from other races, and 0.33% from two or more races. Hispanic or Latino of any race were 0.45% of the population. 26.0% were of German, 12.6% Italian, 11.8% Irish, 9.1% English and 7.3% Scotch-Irish ancestry according to Census 2000. 97.9% spoke English and 1.2% Spanish as their first language.

There were 577 households, out of which 23.1% had children under the age of 18 living with them, 45.4% were married couples living together, 9.0% had a female householder with no husband present, and 43.8% were non-families. 35.2% of all households were made up of individuals, and 15.1% had someone living alone who was 65 years of age or older. The average household size was 2.28 and the average family size was 2.90.

In the borough the population was spread out, with 10.4% under the age of 18, 48.5% from 18 to 24, 12.1% from 25 to 44, 12.1% from 45 to 64, and 16.9% who were 65 years of age or older. The median age was 22 years. For every 100 females there were 61.8 males. For every 100 females age 18 and over, there were 58.1 males.

The median income for a household in the borough was $36,734, and the median income for a family was $56,736. Males had a median income of $36,250 versus $26,125 for females. The per capita income for the borough was $12,749. About 4.2% of families and 15.6% of the population were below the poverty line, including 7.8% of those under age 18 and 7.0% of those age 65 or over.

New Wilmington is surrounded by farms of an Amish settlement which had 19 congregations i.e. about 2,500 people in 2013.

== Education ==
The Wilmington Area School District serves the borough, which includes one elementary school, one middle school and Wilmington Area High School. Additionally, Westminster College is a private liberal arts college located in the borough, founded in 1852.

== Transportation ==
- PA 158
- PA 208
- PA 956
