= Wilmington Township, Lawrence County, Pennsylvania =

Township in Pennsylvania, US

Coordinates: 41°07′00″N 80°17′59″W

Wilmington Township
- Township
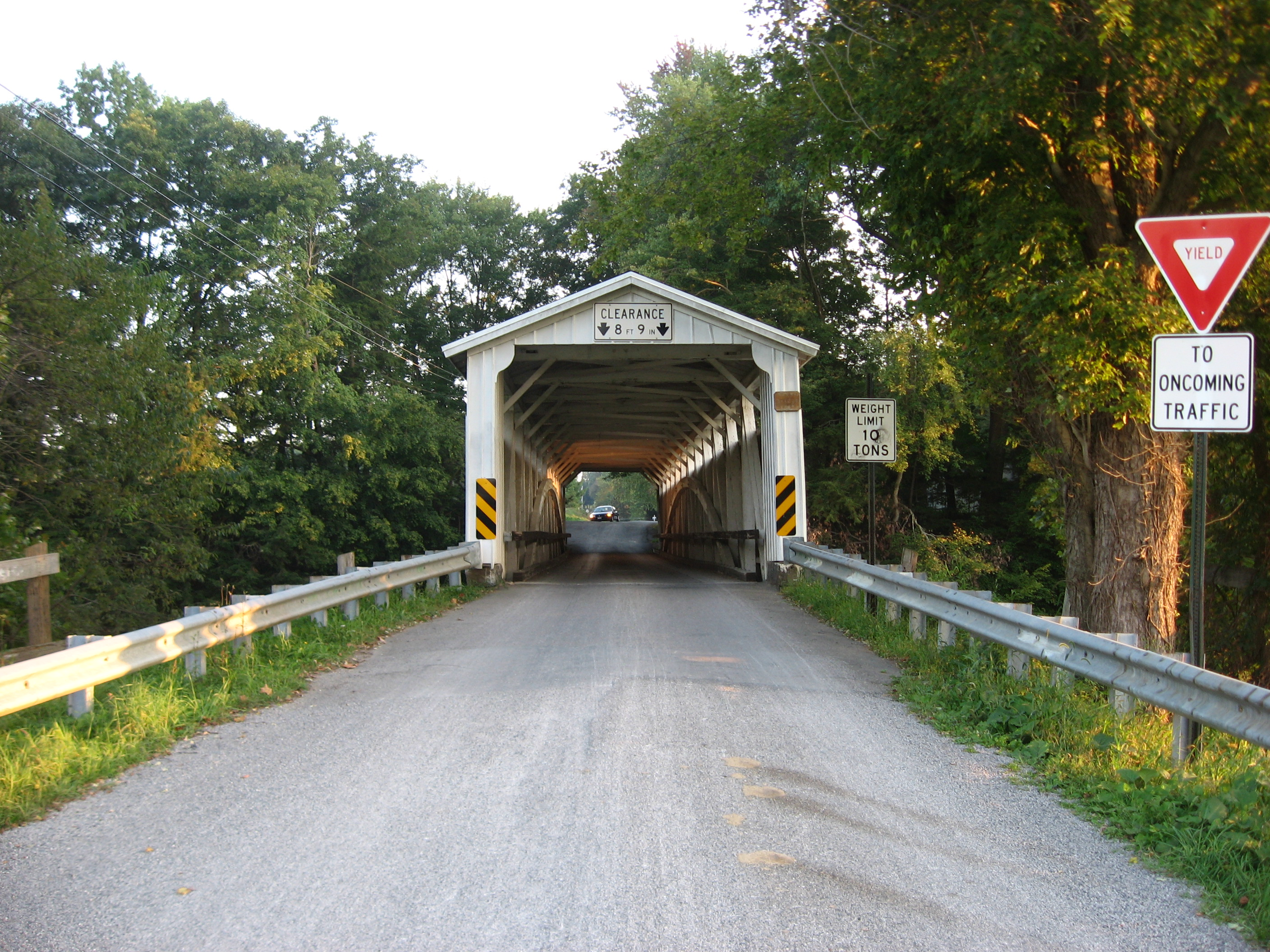
- Banks Covered Bridge (1889); National Register of Historic Places

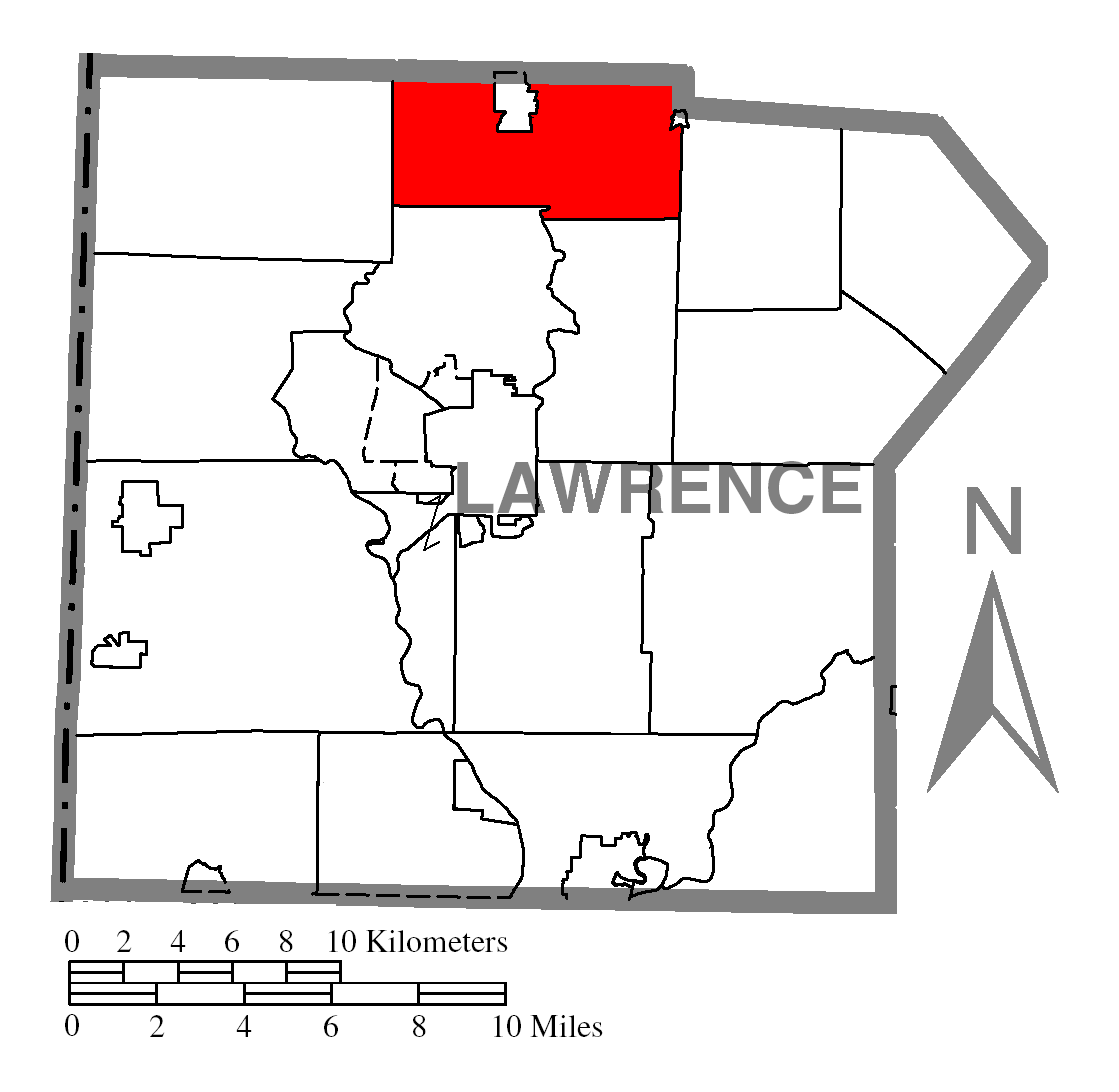
- Location of Wilmington Township in Lawrence County

- Location of Lawrence County in Pennsylvania
- Country: United States
- State: Pennsylvania
- County: Lawrence
- Established: 1850

Area
  - Total: 19.92 sq mi (51.58 km^{2})
  - Land: 19.73 sq mi (51.11 km^{2})
  - Water: 0.18 sq mi (0.47 km^{2})
- Highest elevation (south of Shepard School): 1,290 ft (390 m)
- Lowest elevation (tributary to Shenango River): 885 ft (270 m)

Population (2020)
  - Total: 2,662
  - Estimate (2022): 2,645
  - Density: 133/sq mi (51.5/km^{2})
- Time zone: UTC-4 (EST)
  - Summer (DST): UTC-5 (EDT)
- Area code: 724
- FIPS code: 42-073-85504
- Website: www.wilmingtontwp.net

Wilmington Township is a township in Lawrence County, Pennsylvania, United States. The population was 2,662 at the 2020 census, a decline from the figure of 2,715 tabulated in 2010.

Wilmington was established as a township in February 1846 by combining parts of Neshannock Township in Lawrence County with parts of Lackawannock Township in Mercer County. The borough of New Wilmington is an incorporated enclave within the township.

== History ==
Banks Covered Bridge was listed on the National Register of Historic Places in 1980.

== Geography ==
According to the United States Census Bureau, the township has a total area of 20.0 square miles (51.9 km^{2}), of which 20.0 square miles (51.9 km^{2}) is land and 0.04 square miles (0.1 km^{2}), or 0.10%, is water.

Unincorporated communities in the township include Cottage Grove, Fayette, Mayville, and Neshannock Falls.

== Demographics ==
Historical population
Census	Pop.	Note	%±
2000	2,760		—
2010	2,715		−1.6%
2020	2,662		−2.0%
2022 (est.)	2,645		−0.6%
U.S. Decennial Census

As of the census of 2000, there were 2,760 people, 949 households, and 755 families residing in the township. The population density was 137.8 inhabitants per square mile (53.2/km^{2}). There were 991 housing units at an average density of 49.5 per square mile (19.1/km^{2}). The racial makeup of the township was 99.20% White, 0.29% African American, 0.04% Native American, 0.04% Asian, 0.07% from other races, and 0.36% from two or more races. Hispanic or Latino of any race were 0.54% of the population.

There were 949 households, out of which 35.3% had children under the age of 18 living with them, 70.0% were married couples living together, 6.6% had a female householder with no husband present, and 20.4% were non-families. 18.2% of all households were made up of individuals, and 8.0% had someone living alone who was 65 years of age or older. The average household size was 2.91 and the average family size was 3.34.

In the township the population was spread out, with 30.5% under the age of 18, 7.9% from 18 to 24, 23.9% from 25 to 44, 24.1% from 45 to 64, and 13.5% who were 65 years of age or older. The median age was 37 years. For every 100 females, there were 94.2 males. For every 100 females age 18 and over, there were 95.8 males.

The median income for a household in the township was $40,179, and the median income for a family was $46,397. Males had a median income of $36,893 versus $26,719 for females. The per capita income for the township was $18,323. About 11.0% of families and 16.7% of the population were below the poverty line, including 28.1% of those under age 18 and 8.9% of those age 65 or over.

== Education ==
The Wilmington Area School District serves the township.

== Transportation ==
=== Major roads and highways ===
- I-376
- PA 18
- PA 158
- PA 168
- PA 208
- PA 956
