= Neshannock Creek =

Stream in Pennsylvania, USA

Neshannock Creek Tributary to Shenango River
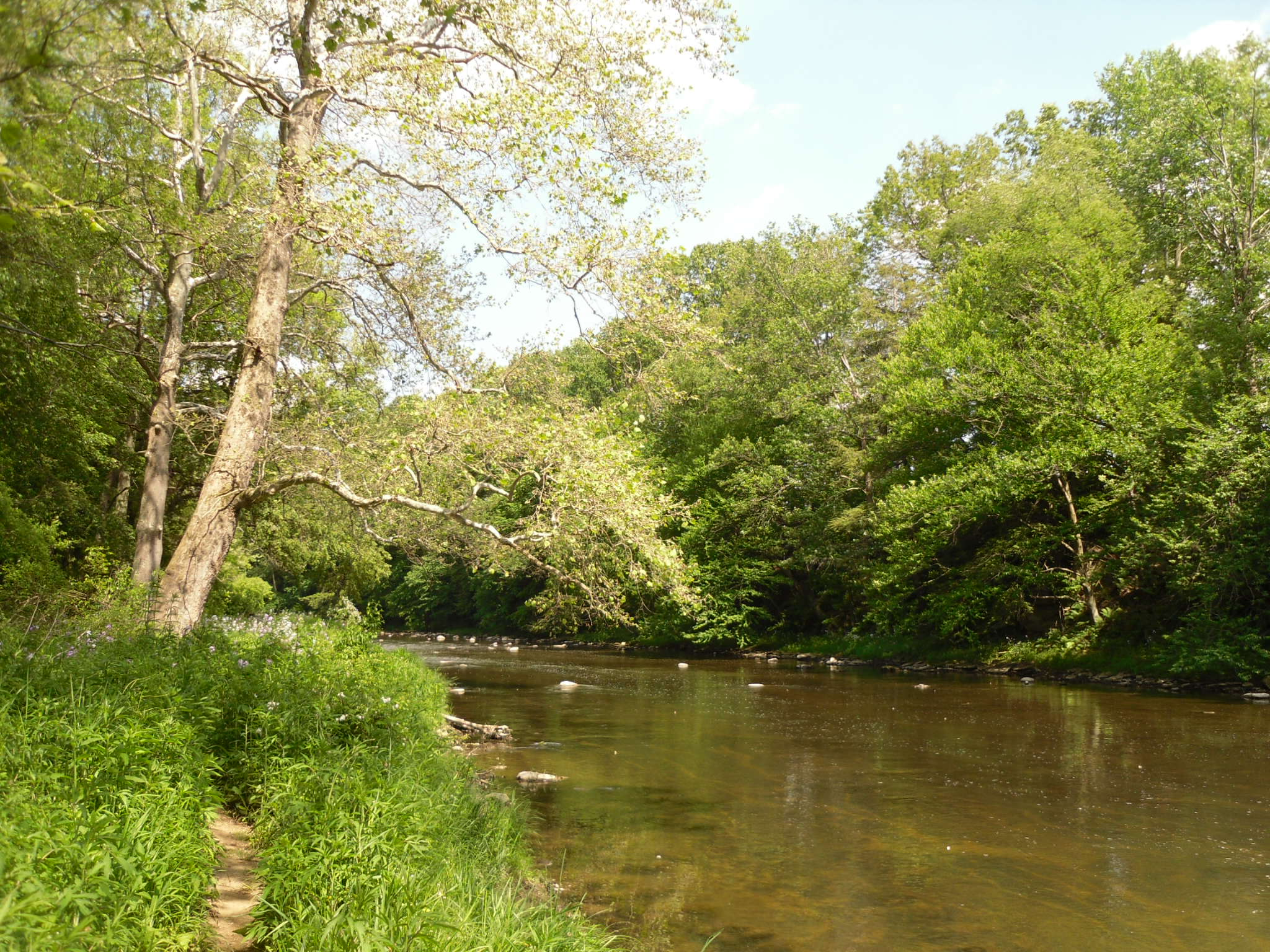

- Location of Neshannock Creek mouth Neshannock Creek (the United States)

Location
- Country: United States
- State: Pennsylvania
- Counties: Lawrence; Mercer

Physical characteristics
- Source: Confluence of Cool Spring and Otter Creeks
  - location: Mercer, Pennsylvania
  - coordinates: 41°13′26″N 080°13′34″W
  - elevation: 1,090 ft (330 m)
- Mouth: Shenango River
  - location: New Castle, Pennsylvania
  - coordinates: 40°59′33″N 080°21′15″W
  - elevation: 800 ft (240 m)
- Length: 25.65 mi (41.28 km)
- Basin size: 240.41 square miles (622.7 km^{2})
- Discharge
  - location: Shenango River
  - average: 308.63 cu ft/s (8.739 m^{3}/s) at mouth with Shenango River

Basin features
- Progression: Shenango River → Beaver River → Ohio River → Mississippi River → Gulf of Mexico
- River system: Beaver River
- Tributaries
  - left: Pine Run; Mill Run; Hunters Run; Potter Run; Hottenbaugh Run
  - right: Beaver Run; Indian Run; Little Neshannock Creek

Neshannock Creek is a 25.65 mi (41.28 km) long tributary to Shenango River that forms at the confluence of Cool Spring and Otter Creek in Mercer County and then flows south to Lawrence County, Pennsylvania. This creek is known for its fly fishing at Volant, Pennsylvania.

Neshannock is a Native American name purported to mean "double stream".

== Course ==
Neshannock Creek begins at the confluence of Cool Spring and Otter Creeks just east of Mercer, Pennsylvania. The creek then flows south to join the Shenango River at New Castle, Pennsylvania.

== Watershed ==
Neshannock Creek drains 240.41 square miles (622.7 km^{2}) of area, receives about 41.3 in/year of precipitation, has a wetness index of 466.95 and is about 41% forested.

== Tributaries ==
Tributaries of Neshannock Creek (Shenango River tributary)

Name, bank	River mile (km)	Watershed area in square miles (km^{2})	Average discharge	Mouth coordinates	Mouth elevation	Source coordinates	Source elevation	Remarks
Mouth		240.41 square miles (622.7 km^{2})	308.63 cu ft/s (8.739 m^{3}/s)	40°59′33″N 080°21′15″W	800 ft (240 m)	41°13′26″N 080°13′34″W	1,090 ft (330 m)	Neshannock Creek enters the Shenango River at New Castle, Pennsylvania.
Hottenbaugh Run, left bank	5.70 mi (9.17 km)	13.93 square miles (36.1 km^{2})	17.62 cu ft/s (0.499 m^{3}/s)	41°02′28″N 080°18′04″W	890 ft (270 m)	41°05′03″N 080°13′07″W	1,290 ft (390 m)	Hottenbaugh Run rises in Lawrence County about 3.5 miles southeast of Volant, Pennsylvania at the divide between this creek and Slippery Rock Creek.
Little Neshannock Creek, right bank	9.80 mi (15.77 km)	50.65 square miles (131.2 km^{2})	63.91 cu ft/s (1.810 m^{3}/s)	41°05′13″N 080°19′00″W	925 ft (282 m)	41°15′01″N 080°19′17″W	1,225 ft (373 m)	Little Neshannock Creek rises in Mercer County on the Shenango River divide and flows south into Lawrence County and enters Neshannock Creek at Mayville, Pennsylvania.
Potter Run, left bank	14.90 mi (23.98 km)	5.69 square miles (14.7 km^{2})	7.79 cu ft/s (0.221 m^{3}/s)	41°06′29″N 080°15′47″W	1,000 ft (300 m)	41°04′42″N 080°14′10″W	1,258 ft (383 m)	Potter Run begins in a pond about 3 miles southeast of Volant, Pennsylvania and flows northwest to meet Neshannock Creek just downstream of Volant, Pennsylvania.
Indian Run, right bank	17.60 mi (28.32 km)	6.84 square miles (17.7 km^{2})	9.86 cu ft/s (0.279 m^{3}/s)	41°08′37″N 080°14′23″W	1,030 ft (310 m)	41°11′28″N 080°17′19″W	1,240 ft (380 m)	Indian Run rises about 1.5 miles southwest of Hoagland and then flows southeast to meet Neshannock Creek at Leesburg Station, Pennsylvania.
Hunters Run, left bank	18.00 mi (28.97 km)	7.21 square miles (18.7 km^{2})	10.40 cu ft/s (0.294 m^{3}/s)	41°09′06″N 080°13′47″W	1,040 ft (320 m)	41°06′45″N 080°11′53″W	1,220 ft (370 m)	Hunters Run rises in northeastern Lawrence County and then flows northwest to meet Neshannock Creek near Springfeld Falls, Pennsylvania. This stream is not described in the PA Gazetteer, but does appear in GNIS and the EPA website. It is prominent as the stream for Springfield Falls.
Mill Run, left bank	19.84 mi (31.93 km)	5.01 square miles (13.0 km^{2})	7.54 cu ft/s (0.214 m^{3}/s)	41°09′53″N 080°13′28″W	1,148 ft (350 m)	41°09′21″N 080°09′37″W	1,230 ft (370 m)	Mill Run rises about 0.5 miles southeast of Blacktown, Pennsylvania and then flows west to meet Neshannock Creek southeast of Millburn, Pennsylvania.
Pine Run, left bank	21.00 mi (33.80 km)	8.85 square miles (22.9 km^{2})	13.31 cu ft/s (0.377 m^{3}/s)	41°10′41″N 080°13′30″W	1,060 ft (320 m)	41°10′46″N 080°08′52″W	1,280 ft (390 m)	Pine Run rises northeast of Blacktown, Pennsylvania and then flows west to meet Neshannock Creek about 1 mile northeast of Millburn, Pennsylvania.
Beaver Run, right bank	23.52 mi (37.85 km)	3.71 square miles (9.6 km^{2})	5.62 cu ft/s (0.159 m^{3}/s)	41°12′04″N 080°13′55″W	1,060 ft (320 m)	41°12′37″N 080°16′36″W	1,220 ft (370 m)	Beaver Run rises about 1.5 miles southwest of Mercer, Pennsylvania on the Shenango River divide and then flows southeast to meet Neshannock Creek about 1 mile south of Mercer.
