= Washington Township, Lawrence County, Pennsylvania =

Township in Pennsylvania, US

Washington Township
- Township
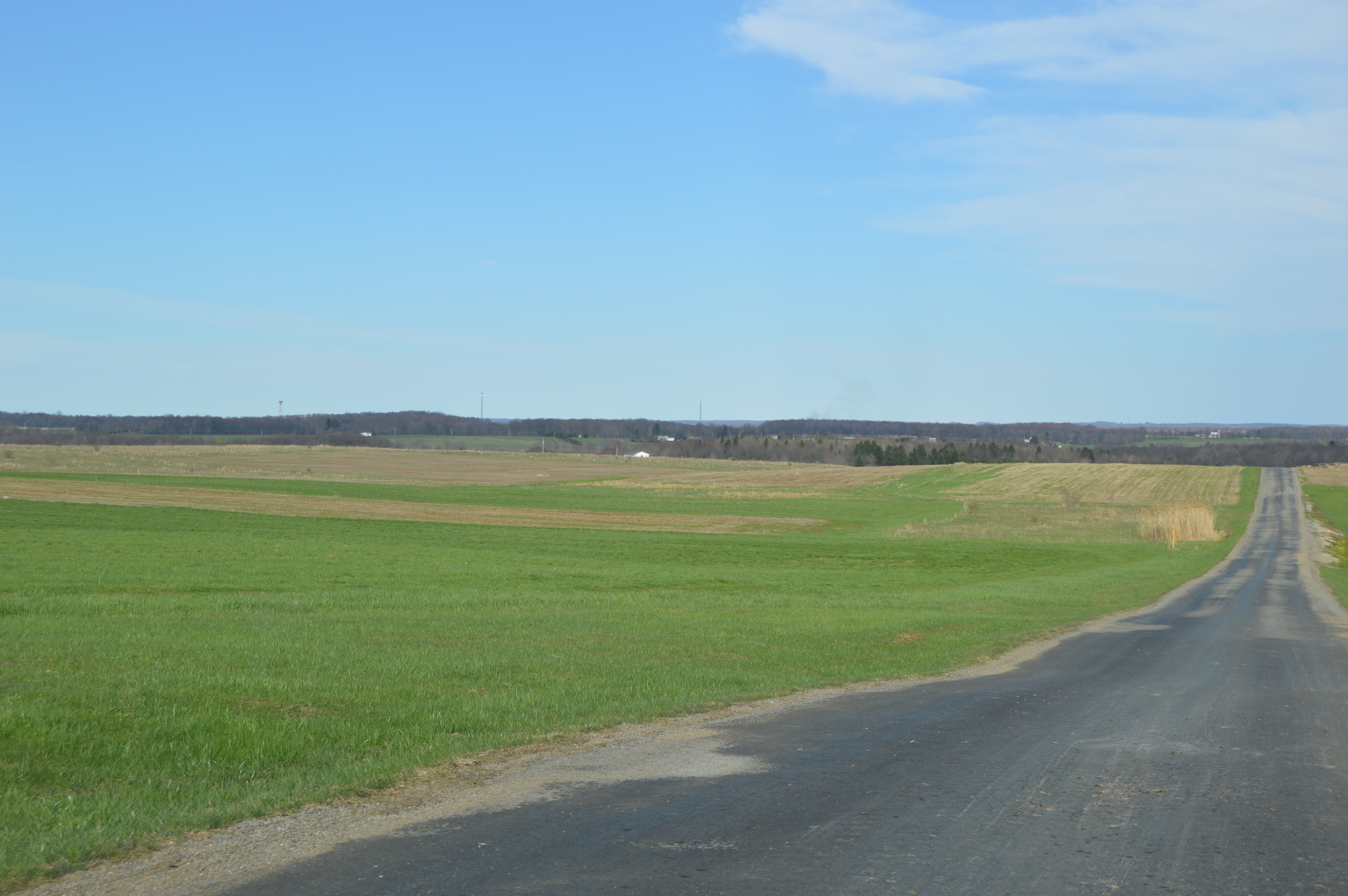
- Fields on Jackson School Road

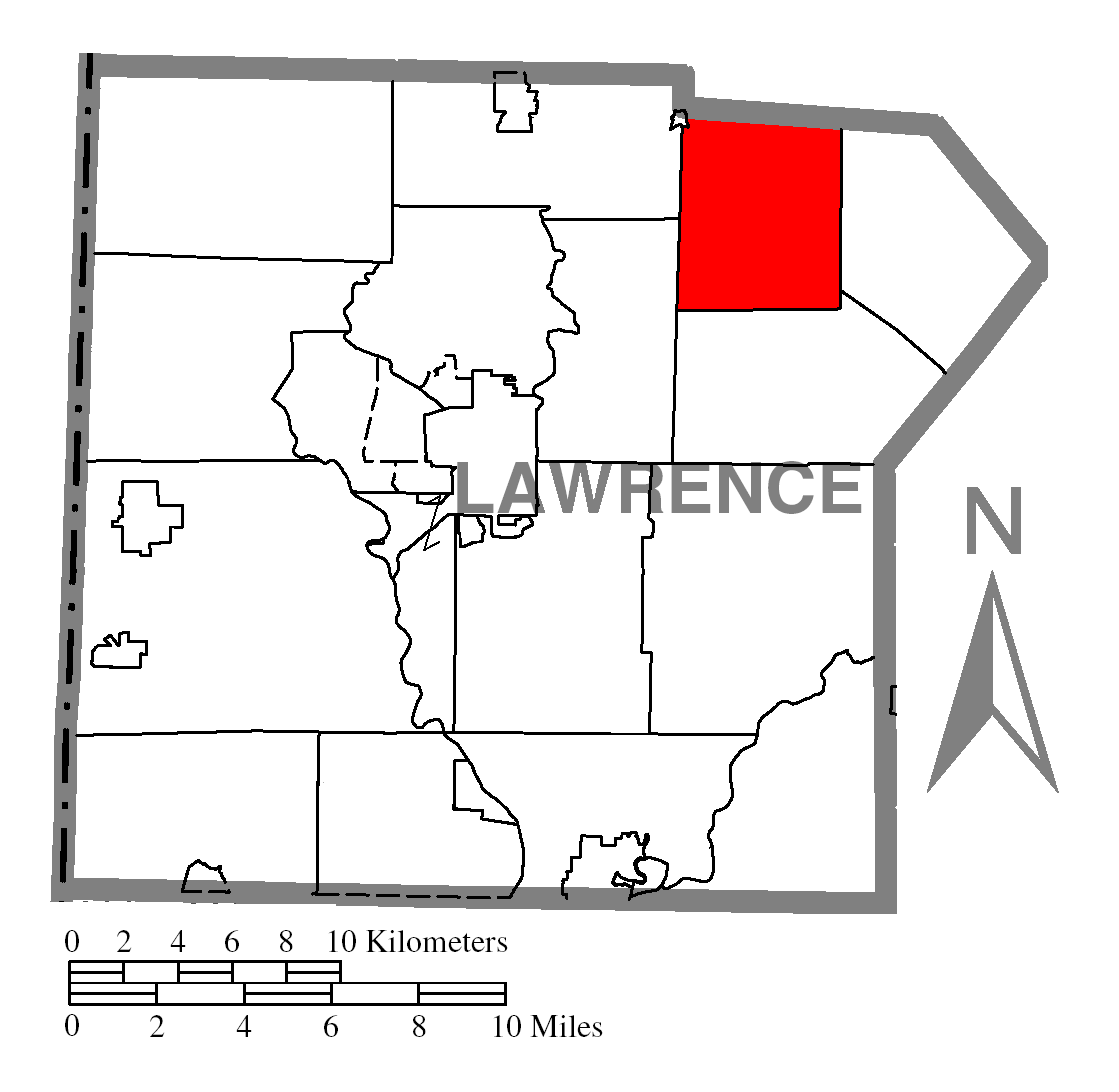
- Location of Washington Township in Lawrence County

- Location of Lawrence County in Pennsylvania
- Coordinates: 41°05′00″N 80°13′59″W
- Country: United States
- State: Pennsylvania
- County: Lawrence
- Established: 1854

Area
  - Total: 16.36 sq mi (42.37 km^{2})
  - Land: 16.17 sq mi (41.87 km^{2})
  - Water: 0.19 sq mi (0.50 km^{2})
- Highest elevation (north of Jackson School): 1,400 ft (430 m)
- Lowest elevation (Neshannock Creek): 1,005 ft (306 m)

Population (2020)
  - Total: 711
  - Estimate (2022): 698
  - Density: 48.4/sq mi (18.68/km^{2})
- Time zone: UTC-4 (EST)
  - Summer (DST): UTC-5 (EDT)
- Area code: 724
- FIPS code: 42-073-81272

Historical population
Census	Pop.	Note	%±
2000	714		—
2010	799		11.9%
2020	710		−11.1%
2022 (est.)	698		−1.7%
U.S. Decennial Census

Washington Township is a township in Lawrence County, Pennsylvania, United States. The population was 710 at the time of the 2020 census, a decline from the figure of 799 tabulated in 2010.

== Geography ==
According to the United States Census Bureau, the township has a total area of 16.6 square miles (43.0 km^{2}), of which 16.4 square miles (42.5 km^{2}) is land and 0.2 square miles (0.5 km^{2}), or 1.26%, is water.

== Demographics ==
As of the census of 2000, there were 714 people, 259 households, and 205 families residing in the township.

The population density was 43.5 inhabitants per square mile (16.8/km^{2}). There were 289 housing units at an average density of 17.6/sq mi (6.8/km^{2}). The racial makeup of the township was 99.86% White and 0.14% Asian. Hispanic or Latino of any race were 0.07% of the population.

There were 259 households, out of which 34.7% had children under the age of 18living with them; 66.4% were married couples living together, 10.4% had a female householder with no husband present, and 20.8% were non-families. 18.5% of all households were made up of individuals, and 7.3% had someone living alone who was 65 years of age or older.

The average household size was 2.76 and the average family size was 3.15.

In the township the population was spread out, with 26.1% under the age of 18, 8.5% from 18 to 24, 28.2% from 25 to 44, 27.6% from 45 to 64, and 9.7% who were 65 years of age or older. The median age was 38 years.

For every 100 females, there were 105.8 males. For every 100 females who were aged 18 or older, there were 106.3 males.

The median income for a household in the township was $38,365, and the median income for a family was $41,705. Males had a median income of $35,167 compared with that of $21,429 for females.

The per capita income for the township was $16,270.

Roughly 9.3% of families and 9.7% of the population were living below the poverty line, including 12.6% of those who were under the age of 18 and 2.5% of those who were aged 65 or older.

== Education ==
The Wilmington Area School District serves the township.

== Transportation ==
=== Major roads and highways ===
- US 19
- PA 168
- PA 208
