= Shenango River =

Stream in Pennsylvania, USA

Shenango River Tributary to Beaver River
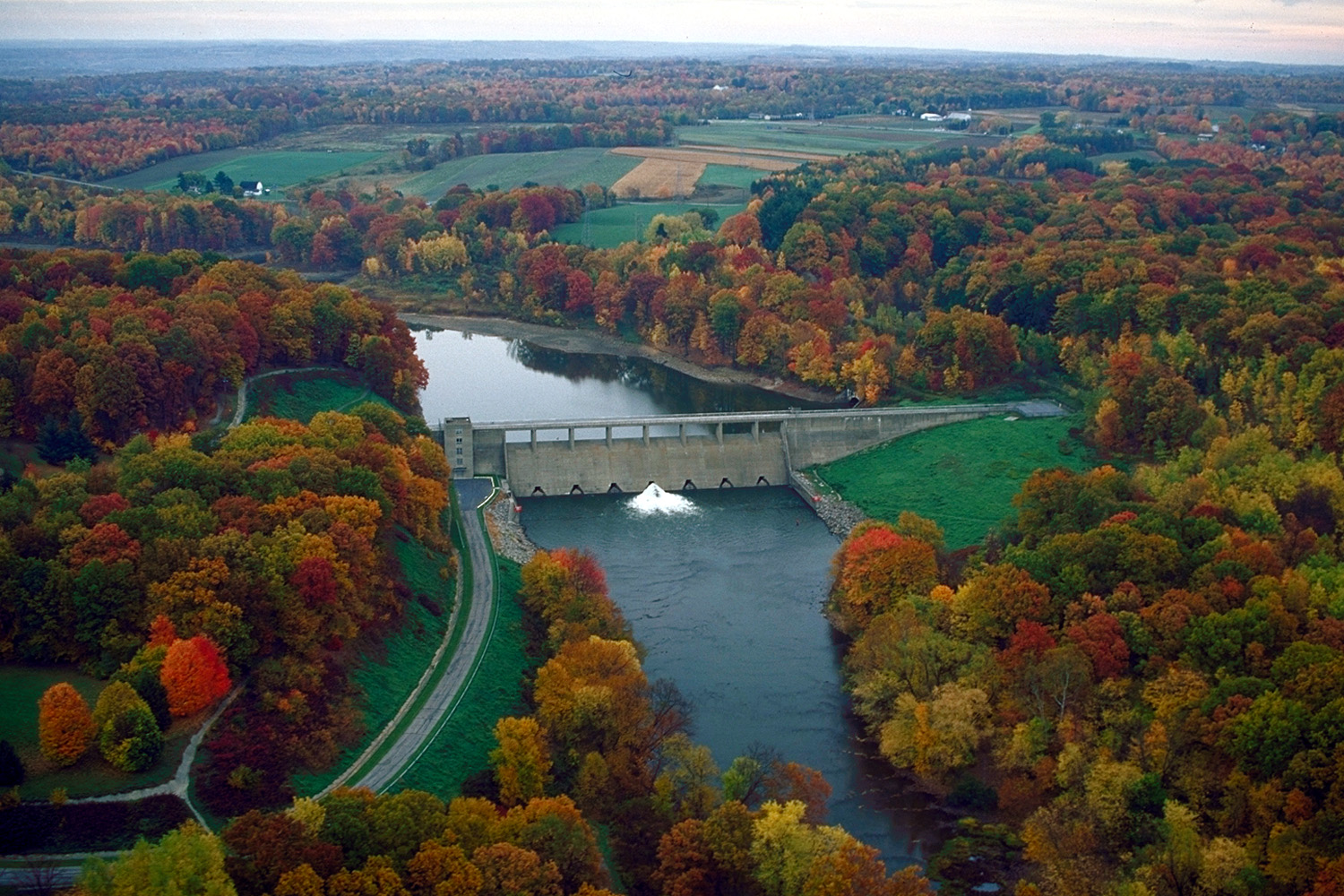
- The Shenango River, flowing from the dam of Shenango River Lake in South Pymatuning Township, Mercer County, Pennsylvania

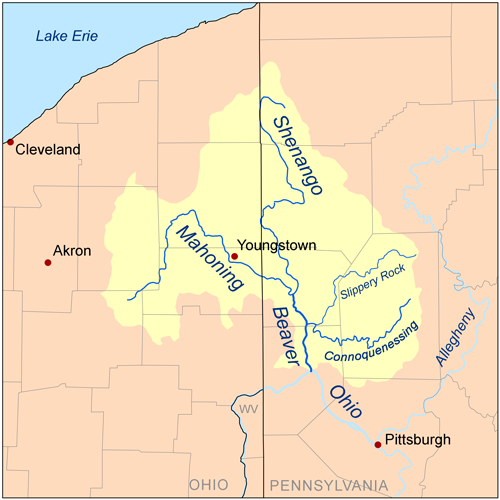

Location
- Country: United States
- State: Pennsylvania; Ohio
- Counties: Ashtabula (OH); Crawford (PA); Lawrence (PA); Mercer (PA)

Physical characteristics
- Source: Pymatuning Swamp (divide between Shenango River and French Creek)
  - location: Sadsbury Township, Pennsylvania
  - coordinates: 41°33′21″N 080°25′41″W
  - elevation: 1,010 ft (310 m)
- Mouth: Beaver River
  - location: New Castle, Pennsylvania
  - coordinates: 40°57′29″N 080°22′43″W
  - elevation: 760 ft (230 m)
- Length: 82.66 mi (133.03 km)
- Basin size: 1,065.33 square miles (2,759.2 km^{2})
- Discharge
  - location: Beaver River
  - average: 1,381.73 cu ft/s (39.126 m^{3}/s) at mouth with Beaver River

Basin features
- Progression: South
- River system: Beaver River
- Tributaries
  - left: Little Shenango River; Mathay Run; Lawango Run; Lackawannock Creek; Daley Run; Magargee Run; Pine Hollow Run; Thornton Run; Pine Run; Buchanon Run; Neshannock Creek; Big Run
  - right: Linesville Creek; Ashtabula River; Gravel Run; Black Creek; McMichaels Creek; Sugar Run; Big Run; Brush Run; Chestnut Run; Pymatuning Creek; McCullough Run; Big Run; Yankee Run; Turkey Run; Deer Creek
- Waterbodies: Pymatuning Lake; Shenango Lake

The Shenango River is a principal tributary of the Beaver River, approximately 100 mi (160 km) long, in western Pennsylvania in the United States. It also briefly flows through small portions of northeastern Ohio. Via the Beaver and Ohio Rivers, it is part of the watershed of the Mississippi River.

The Shenango, whose name comes from the Iroquoian "Shanango," meaning "the beautiful one," rises in west-central Crawford County and initially flows northwestwardly into the Pymatuning Reservoir, which was formed in 1934 by the construction of a dam on the river. The lake turns to the south, widening into Ashtabula County, Ohio, and passing through Pymatuning State Park. Below the dam and after returning fully to Pennsylvania, the Shenango flows south-southeastwardly into Mercer County, flowing through Jamestown and Greenville before turning westwardly into Shenango River Lake, formed in 1965 by a United States Army Corps of Engineers dam. Below that dam, the Shenango flows southwestwardly through the communities of Sharpsville and Sharon (near which it briefly enters Trumbull County, Ohio); then south-southeastwardly past Farrell, Wheatland and West Middlesex into Lawrence County, where it passes New Castle and Oakland. It joins the Mahoning River to form the Beaver River, 3 mi (4.8 km) southwest of New Castle.

Tributaries of the Shenango include the short Little Shenango River, which flows for its entire length in Mercer County and joins the Shenango from the east at Greenville; Pymatuning Creek, which flows into Shenango River Lake; and Neshannock Creek, which joins the river at New Castle.

== See also ==
- List of rivers of Ohio
- List of rivers of Pennsylvania
