= WWIZ (Lorain, Ohio) =

Radio station in Lorain, Ohio (1958–1967)

- Lorain, Ohio; United States
- Broadcast area: Lorain County; Greater Cleveland (limited)
- Frequency: 1380 kHz

Ownership
- Owner: WWIZ, Inc.

History
- First air date: October 26, 1958
- Last air date: July 14, 1967

Technical information
- Class: D
- Power: 500 watts (daytime)
- Transmitter coordinates: 41°25′48″N 82°09′07″W

WWIZ was a commercial radio station at 1380 AM that was licensed to Lorain, Ohio, United States, and broadcast from 1958 to 1967 during the daytime hours only. WWIZ's studios were located in downtown Lorain, and the transmitter was sited in adjacent Sheffield Township.

This station was initially built by Sanford A. Schafitz, who also built a radio station in the Youngstown, Ohio, area. Schafitz sold a minority interest in WWIZ to The Lorain Journal weeks after the station signed on. When the Journal announced a full acquisition of WWIZ in 1961, the ownership of WEOL—already in prolonged litigation against the newspaper—protested the move to the Federal Communications Commission (FCC). After an FCC investigation revealed the first purchase was in actuality an ownership transfer the agency was not notified over, the FCC revoked WWIZ's license, as well as a television station in Youngstown that Schafitz also built. WWIZ shut down in 1967 following two years of appeals and one year of limbo as three groups sought a replacement license but failed to agree on an interim operation. One of those applicants signed on WLRO in December 1969; it continues on the air today as WDLW.

== History ==
=== Application, construction, and sign-on ===
A native of Sharon, Pennsylvania, Sanford A. Schafitz filed paperwork with the Federal Communications Commission (FCC) on July 1955 to construct a 500-watt radio station at 1380 kHz in Lorain, Ohio, having already constructed WFAR in Farrell, Pennsylvania. Schafitz acquired 2 acres (0.81 ha) of land in adjacent Sheffield Township in March 1956 for a transmitter site. A hearing by FCC examiner Hugh B. Hutchinson began on May 1, 1956, where WSPD in Toledo, Ohio, and WTTH in Port Huron, Michigan, both objected over potential interference; WEOL in Elyria, Ohio, testified as a witness for the two stations but did not oppose the application. Hutchinson issued a recommendation on December 5, 1956, per review by the commission, saying the need for a station to serve Lorain outweighed any interference to WSPD or WTTH. By December 1957, The Plain Dealer reported the FCC was drafting approval documents. Schafitz estimated the station's minimum startup cost at $23,000 and expenses of $36,000 during the first year, which he promised to alleviate by installing the equipment himself and employing announcers with restricted operator licenses. Studio space was rented on the second floor of the Central Lorain Commercial Building on Broadway Avenue in the city's downtown. The FCC issued the permit on May 8, 1958, and assigned it the WWIZ calls by June 6.

WWIZ was the second AM station to launch in Lorain County, joining WEOL. The station planned to sign on by November 1, 1958, and did so on October 26 with a dedication program at 12 p.m. An open house was held at the station's studios where 1,500 to 2,000 people were estimated to have attended. WWIZ had a full-service radio format of music, Associated Press wire newscasts, interviews, public service and church programs that Schafitz also billed as "Astro-sonic Sound". Jeff Baxter was WWIZ's inaugural program director, coming over from WEOL; The station had a staff of 10 off- and on-air personnel and represented a final investment of $75,000. By December 1959, Baxter joined WERE as their overnight host. WWIZ linked with the ABC Radio Network in January 1960, it would remain with ABC alongside Cleveland station WJMO through 1965, when WGAR took over the affiliation for the Greater Cleveland region. Other hosts at WWIZ included Bob Lockwood, Alan Mink, Bob Lee and polka host Bob "BJ" Sellers. Mike Adams joined WWIZ in 1961 as morning host, a role he held until the station's closure. Jim Allen Popiel, who had a long tenure as a sportscaster for various Lorain County radio stations, began his career at WWIZ in 1960 under the air name Jim Valentine.

=== Stock purchases by the Lorain Journal and WEOL protest ===
On February 28, 1959, The Lorain Journal purchased what was initially reported as "a minority interest" of WWIZ. This was not the Journal's first attempt to enter radio broadcasting. In 1946, it and the co-owned Mansfield News Journal in Mansfield, Ohio, applied for radio stations in Lorain and Mansfield, but were rejected by the FCC due to boycott policies directed against advertisers with WMAN. WEOL and WEOL-FM launched on October 17, 1948, and within weeks accused the Journal of the same restrictive policies. The U.S. Justice Department opened up an investigation against the Journal, visiting the paper's offices in May 1949, and by November, sued the paper on violations of the Sherman Antitrust Act, charging it with operating as a monopoly on media coverage and revenue in Lorain. The Journal was found guilty of these charges by U.S. Northern Ohio district court Judge Emerich B. Freed after a brief trial, which was appealed to the U.S. Supreme Court and affirmed in the 1951 ruling Lorain Journal Co. v. United States. WEOL and WMAN both filed treble damages lawsuits against both papers, which had yet to go to trial due to the 1956 death of publisher Samuel A. Horvitz. In turn, both papers filed license renewal challenges against both stations in September 1955 but were renewed by the FCC by December 1956.

The minority interest purchase of WWIZ by the Journal had its roots in an arrangement made between Schafitz and the paper on September 15, 1958, five days before the station was incorporated, and several months after Lorain County Printing and Publishing (LCP&P), publishers of the Elyria Chronicle-Telegram, purchased stock in the Elyria-Lorain Broadcasting Co., owners of WEOL. Schafitz told the FCC that he still held total control of WWIZ, but the $36,000 deal included the Journal receiving 90 of the 200 shares of common stock and all 200 shares of preferred stock in the station, at $100 a share. Two Journal associates, publisher Harry R. Horvitz and attorney William G. Wickens, were named to WWIZ's three-person board of directors despite Schafitz being 55 percent majority owner and president. General manager Leonard Schafitz—Sanford's brother—left WWIZ in February 1960 for a role at WXTV, Sanford's planned Youngstown UHF television station. WWIZ's studios were relocated to the Palace Theatre at the end of 1960.

The Journal filed paperwork with the FCC on June 5, 1961, to acquire all remaining 110 common stock shares for $70,000, at $636 a share. WEOL protested this deal to the FCC, accusing Schafitz of license trafficking and attempting to legitimize the Journal's control over WWIZ; WEOL also asserted Horvitz and Wickens had the authority to dismiss any staffer and Schafitz won the permit by falsely claiming he would be the sole stockholder. The Journal accused WEOL of continued harassment; in May 1960, WEOL's treble damages lawsuit against the Journal went to trial for the first time and ended with the paper winning over a lack of evidence. WWIZ's license—which was up for renewal—was designated for hearing by the FCC on February 23, 1962, along with the Journal stock transactions as part of a review of Schafitz's holdings over possible misrepresentation. Horvitz and Journal vice president Carl Adams said in a joint statement, "[w]e made this application to purchase as a result of our sincere conviction that, as operators of ... WWIZ, we can provide the Lorain area with top-quality programming and thereby render a public service to our community." At the Youngstown TV station, it was revealed Schafitz failed to disclose to the FCC that WXTV's 50 percent owner, Guy W. Gully, was indicted for a felony. WXTV went dark three days later, citing technical difficulties.

=== FCC investigations ===
The hearing, conducted by administrative law judge Chester F. Naumowicz, Jr., began on June 11, 1962, with WEOL as a party in the proceedings. Schafitz was the first to testify; during questioning, Schafitz stated Horvitz first expressed an interest at WWIZ early in 1958, and during a follow-up conversation on September 1958, Schafitz began the incorporation process at Horvitz's suggestion. Wickens testified that he held no authority over WWIZ despite his association with Horvitz, although he did complain about the station's emphasis on rock and roll music and previously threatened to resign from the board due to poor communication from Schafitz. Naumowicz rejected a subpoena request from WEOL for all written correspondence between Schafitz and Horvitz; WWIZ attorney John C. Doerfer was opposed to releasing potentially irrelevant information to a competitor.

On January 24, 1963, the FCC's Broadcast Bureau recommended all of Schafitz's licenses, including WWIZ, be revoked in a blanket rejection. Their findings showed Schafitz, preoccupied and desirous of funding to build WXTV, was willing to sell WWIZ stock shares to the Journal "upon such conditions as Horvitz would dictate"; thus, the Journal actually paid Schafitz $56,000 in exchange for the stock—with the intent to finance WXTV—and concealed the deal from the FCC. The Bureau concluded neither Schafitz, Horvitz nor the Journal had the character qualifications to hold a broadcast license. An anonymous letter to the editor in the Journal responded to the Bureau by saying, "[t]his radio station has in no way has done anything wrong... if you intend to shut down... WWIZ on mere technicalities, you are doing a great injustice to the majority of Lorain's 75,000 people... Now is the time for all faithful WWIZ listeners to come to the aid and defense of their station, and I'm sure they will". Naumowicz, however, recommended a renewal of WFAR and WWIZ's licenses and the sale to the Journal be approved, as he saw no evidence of a covert transaction and said the paper only took steps "necessary to safeguard its investment" but also called for WXTV's license to be revoked.

=== License revocation and further litigation ===
In a unanimous 5-0 decision, the FCC ruled on March 25, 1964, to reject WWIZ's license renewal and the Journal's purchase of the station, overruling Naumowicz. The FCC asserted Schafitz and the Journal participated in an ownership transfer without the commission's knowledge. The Journal avoided 100 percent ownership as the paper did not want to jeopardize their purchase of WCLW in Mansfield, which WMAN protested and was later dismissed, nor did it want to give WEOL an opportunity to protest. WWIZ's corporation structure was set up in a way for the newspaper to exercise control over it, and Horvitz insisted first call on profits, the ability to countersign checks, and to have the station's records kept at the Journal offices. Schafitz's time devoted to WWIZ's operations decreased dramatically after its first six months on the air as he became preoccupied with WXTV, and from May 1960 onward, he spent no time at the station. Horvitz called the ruling a "tragedy" and said, "... the FCC has become a dispenser of political plums and a source of power for the influence peddlers who live off it". WWIZ and WXTV were both ordered to cease operations by June 1, 1964, or within 60 days after all litigation ended but allowed WFAR's license to be renewed, finding its programming was satisfactory.

Following the FCC's ruling against WWIZ, LCP&P announced their purchase of all stock in Elyria-Lorain Broadcasting Co. held by the Loren M. Berry foundation on June 24, 1964. The FCC initially approved the stock transfer, but the Journal filed to block it prompting the FCC to designated WEOL and WEOL-FM's licenses for hearing by September 1965 on potential media concentration issues in Elyria, with Elyria-Lorain facing a possible $10,000 fine. This hearing effectively reversed the roles between WEOL and the Journal. Before the evidentiary review began, the Journal withdrew from the case after a request to a request to examine documents, some dating back to 1946, was denied. The examiner ruled in favor of LCP&P, WEOL and WBEA (renamed from WEOL-FM) in August 1966, approving the transfer and renewing the licenses. A retrial in WEOL's treble damages lawsuit against the Journal was ordered by the Ohio District Courts of Appeals, in which the judge reversed his prior ruling on February 6, 1964, in favor of WEOL, but only awarded the station $30,000. WEOL appealed this judgement to the Ohio District Court as inadequate; the judge was overruled and another retrial was ordered, with the appeals court implying a different judge oversee it. The case was settled in 1967 with $96,000 awarded to WEOL; WMAN's lawsuit against the News-Journal was settled without going to trial.

The unique nature of the FCC's decision allowing for WFAR's renewal and denying the same for WWIZ resulted in an appeal to the District of Columbia Court of Appeals. In a first-of-its-kind decision, the D.C. Court ruled on September 8, 1965, that the FCC was in its right to allow WFAR to continue, saying the FCC's investigation had generally found "favorable" findings regarding the Farrell operation. Schafitz and the Journal appealed this ruling to the U.S. Supreme Court, who denied cert. on April 4, 1966, and again on May 18.

=== 1380 AM after WWIZ ===
Even while WWIZ remained on the air, applications reached the FCC to operate a new station on the frequency it was about to vacate. The first of these, filed in May 1966, came from Lorain Community Broadcasting, with Allied Broadcasting following closely thereafter. They were soon joined by Midwest Broadcasting; this led the FCC to grant an indefinite extension for WWIZ and considered placing the station into a trusteeship led by all three applicants, who would operate it on an interim basis for two to three years until a permanent license was selected. Schafitz also filed to operate a replacement license, but this was dismissed as moot. Lorain Community, Allied and Midwest were placed in comparative hearing, but Lorain Community and Midwest did not want to associate with Allied, who had alleged connections with principals of the Journal. The FCC rejected the interim applications on June 14, 1967, and ordered WWIZ off the air within 30 days. WWIZ signed off permanently at sunset on July 14, one day earlier than expected; a staff announcer arrived at the studios the next day and found it was no longer broadcasting. Another staffer reportedly was offered half of the profits from sale of the transmitter tower in lieu of two weeks vacation pay.

FCC examiner Millward French ruled in favor of Midwest Broadcasting in August 1967, but in June 1968, the FCC reversed French and granted Lorain Community Broadcasting the application instead. Under the new WLRO call sign, Lorain Community signed on this station on December 4, 1969, after obtaining program authority to begin broadcasts; WLRO received its full license on October 1, 1970.

Schafitz continued to own WFAR until his death on May 30, 1979, at the age of 53. Four days later, a lawsuit filed by Harry Horvitz to remove Journal treasurer Francis Kane and brother William from the estate of father Samuel Horvitz went to trial. During the trial, Horvitz testified the Journal's ownership of WWIZ was funded by the trust and was its sole money-losing venture; Horvitz claimed Kane handled the accounting for the purchase of WWIZ and that the FCC investigated the station based on Kane's involvement. The trust, worth approximately $700 million, was broken up, and Horvitz was induced to sell his newspapers in 1987 as part of a larger liquidation. Horvitz died on January 23, 1991, at the age of 71.
