= WNCR =

WNCR may refer to:

- WNCR, a radio station (930 AM), licensed to Elyria, Ohio, United States
- WNCR-LD, a low-power television station (channel 21, virtual 41) licensed to Tarboro, North Carolina, United States
- WGAR-FM, a radio station (99.5 FM) licensed to Cleveland, Ohio, United States, which carried the WNCR callsign from 1970 to 1975
