= WNCR (AM) =

Catholic radio station in Elyria, Ohio

Simulcast of WCCR, Cleveland, OH
- Elyria, Ohio; United States
- Broadcast area: Lorain County; Medina County
- Frequency: 930 kHz
- Branding: The Rock Catholic Radio

Programming
- Format: Religious (Catholic)
- Affiliations: EWTN Radio

Ownership
- Owner: St. Peter the Rock Media, Inc.
- Sister stations: WCCR

History
- First air date: October 17, 1948
- Former call signs: WEOL (1948–2025)

Technical information
- Licensing authority: FCC
- Facility ID: 19463
- Class: B
- Power: 1,000 watts
- Transmitter coordinates: 41°16′10.2″N 82°0′15.5″W
- Translator: 100.3 W262DM (Elyria)

Links
- Public license information: Public file; LMS
- Webcast: Listen live
- Website: rockcatholicradio.com

WNCR (930 AM) is a non-commercial radio station licensed to Elyria, Ohio, United States. Owned by St. Peter the Rock Media, Inc, it features a Catholic–oriented religious format as a full-time simulcast of WCCR (1260 AM), serving Lorain and Medina counties and the western parts of Greater Cleveland. The station's transmitter is in nearby Grafton; in addition to a standard analog transmission, WNCR simulcasts over low-power analog Elyria translator W262DM (100.3 FM) and is available online.

This station signed on as WEOL in 1948 by the Elyria-Lorain Broadcasting Co. alongside FM adjunct WEOL-FM, featuring a full-service format oriented towards Lorain County with an emphasis on local news and sports. A court fight between WEOL and The Lorain Journal over the newspaper's retaliatory policies against advertisers in Lorain, Ohio, resulted in the 1951 U.S. Supreme Court decision Lorain Journal Co. v. United States, a treble damages lawsuit filed against the paper that took 15 years and two retrials to resolve, and two separate license renewal challenges filed by the Journal. From 1958 onward, the station was controlled by the publishers of the Elyria Chronicle-Telegram. Eliminating all music programming in late 1997 in favor of all-news and later talk radio, WEOL continued to feature various local shows and high school sports coverage until 2025, when the license was sold to St. Peter the Rock Media.

== Application, construction and sign-on ==
Organized on December 10, 1945, in Elyria, Ohio, the Elyria-Lorain Broadcasting Co. filed paperwork with the Federal Communications Commission (FCC) on April 24, 1946, to construct an AM station, one month after filing for an FM station permit. In addition to multiple area businessmen that included Bendix president David O. Thomas as chairman, the leading stockholder in Elyria-Lorain was Roy W. Ammel, vice-president of the Elyria Telephone Company since 1941; Ammel previous achieved fame as the first pilot to fly nonstop from New York City to the Panama Canal in 1930. The FM application, one of 11 filed in the Cleveland, Akron and Elyria area, was reviewed by the FCC beginning in April 1946, where Elyria-Lorain argued that Cleveland stations did not adequately cover Lorain County. The FM permit to broadcast at 107.3 MHz was granted on June 30, 1947, alongside the ten other applicants, and the AM permit to broadcast at 930 kHz was granted on September 11, 1947.

By April 1948, both stations adopted the WEOL and WEOL-FM call signs, standing for Wellington, Elyria, Oberlin and Lorain. Bert Koeblitz, associated with WHK for over 17 years, was hired as general manager. In addition to studios at the Elyria Savings and Trust Building in downtown Elyria and transmitter in Grafton Township, auxiliary studios were constructed at Oberlin College and the Antlers Hotel in Lorain, a combined investment of $250,000. Both WEOL and WEOL-FM took to the air at 7:30 a.m. on October 17, 1948, with minimal fanfare; the first program consisted of organ music, staff were introduced on-air at 2 p.m. that afternoon. Among the initial air staff was cooking program host Alice Schowalter, who joined WEWS-TV several months later under the stage name Alice Weston.

Four area churches, including two affiliated with the Assemblies of God, filed complaints with the FCC of religious discrimination after WEOL declined to carry an interdenominational program days before the stations signed on. Ammel countered that the Assemblies of God were not a recognized religious body. On May 10, 1949, twelve off- and on-air staffers went on strike in a labor dispute, taking both stations off-air. Broadcasts were resumed one day later with replacement personnel and the transmitter towers were monitored by the Lorain County Sherriff. WEOL successfully sued Lorain's mayor, chief of police, and chief of public safety in July 1949 when they denied the station access to reports and information. By April 1950, Maurice Condon, former sidekick to Jack Paar and brother of Plain Dealer television editor George E. Condon, was named general manager. Condon was the sixth person in the role in two years; the instability was attributed to disagreements between management and Ammel.

== Litigation against The Lorain Journal ==
=== U.S. Justice Department antitrust lawsuit ===
Alleging an "advertising dictatorship," WEOL pointed out that "an advertiser should be allowed to spend his advertising dollar as he sees fit" and attributed the newspapers' actions to a mutual "isolation policy" governing county ads.

"That may be sound local newspaper policy. But WEOL cannot, under the terms of its license, observe such a policy," [general manager Bert] Koeblitz observed. "Its facilities must be offered to all of Lorain County."

— Broadcasting-Telecasting, November 29, 1948

On May 15, 1949, two agents from the U.S. Justice Department's antitrust division visited the offices of The Lorain Journal, a daily newspaper that held a monopoly on news coverage and advertising revenue in Lorain. The inquiry was centered around accusations of the Journal's public hostility towards WEOL and the FCC; the Journal described WEOL as "... the attempted invasion of the Lorain field by an outside radio station". The Journal and the co-owned Mansfield News-Journal in Mansfield, Ohio, applied for radio stations in both cities in 1946, but were ultimately rejected by the FCC due to boycott practices against advertisers of Mansfield station WMAN. On November 15, 1948, WEOL accused the Journal on-air of an "advertising dictatorship" against the station that was "simply a carbon copy of the Mansfield situation" and criticized the paper (along with the Elyria Chronicle-Telegram) for refusing to carry their program logs, even if offered as paid advertising.

The Justice Department sued the Journal on November 15, 1949, with violating the Sherman Antitrust Act by punishing business that wished to advertise on WEOL or The Sunday News, a weekly newspaper, and acting as a "private government which rules" Lorain. The Journal requested an immediate trial, with the paper's legal counsel Parker Fulton calling the lawsuit "too important a case to have a new and novel interpretation of law". A pre-trial stop-gap injunction the Justice Department sought for immediate relief to WEOL and the News was denied by U.S. Northern Ohio district court Judge Emerich B. Freed. Unaware of the dispute, the Lorain County Republican Party placed political advertising for both outlets but had their Journal ads abruptly cancelled by Journal business manager D. P. Self; a party spokesman called it "unexpected" and "... completely disrupted our campaign advertising plans".

The trial began on March 2, 1950, and lasted for eight days, with the Justice Department calling 65 witnesses to the stand. Former WEOL manager Charles Thonquest testified the station offered to advertise in the Journal to promote their launch, but was denied. Self told Thornquest that it was against standard practice for Lorain businesses to advertise in the Chronicle-Telegram or for Elyria businesses to advertise in the Journal. An executive for Sears, Roebuck & Co. testified the Journal refused to renew their contract if they continued to advertise in the Sunday News, and a Lorain haberdasher testified he was personally visited by Self after agreeing to advertise with WEOL and pressured to choose between it or the Journal. A letter written by Self to area businesses stated any advertisers associating with WEOL would have their Journal contracts cancelled in 30 days. Much of the testimony was repetitive and often unchallenged. Cross-examination by Fulton revealed Ammel invited correspondence from out-of-state listeners after Ammel learned of the Justice Department's investigation, but Freed ruled the evidence obtained was admissible in court. The Journal's lone witness, publisher Samuel A. Horvitz, asserted their advertising policy was intended for clients to choose between advertising on the newspaper or the radio station. Horvitz also claimed Howard Metzenbaum, then a broker for Will S. Halle & Co., offered to arrange a sale of WEOL to the Journal, which Horvitz rejected.

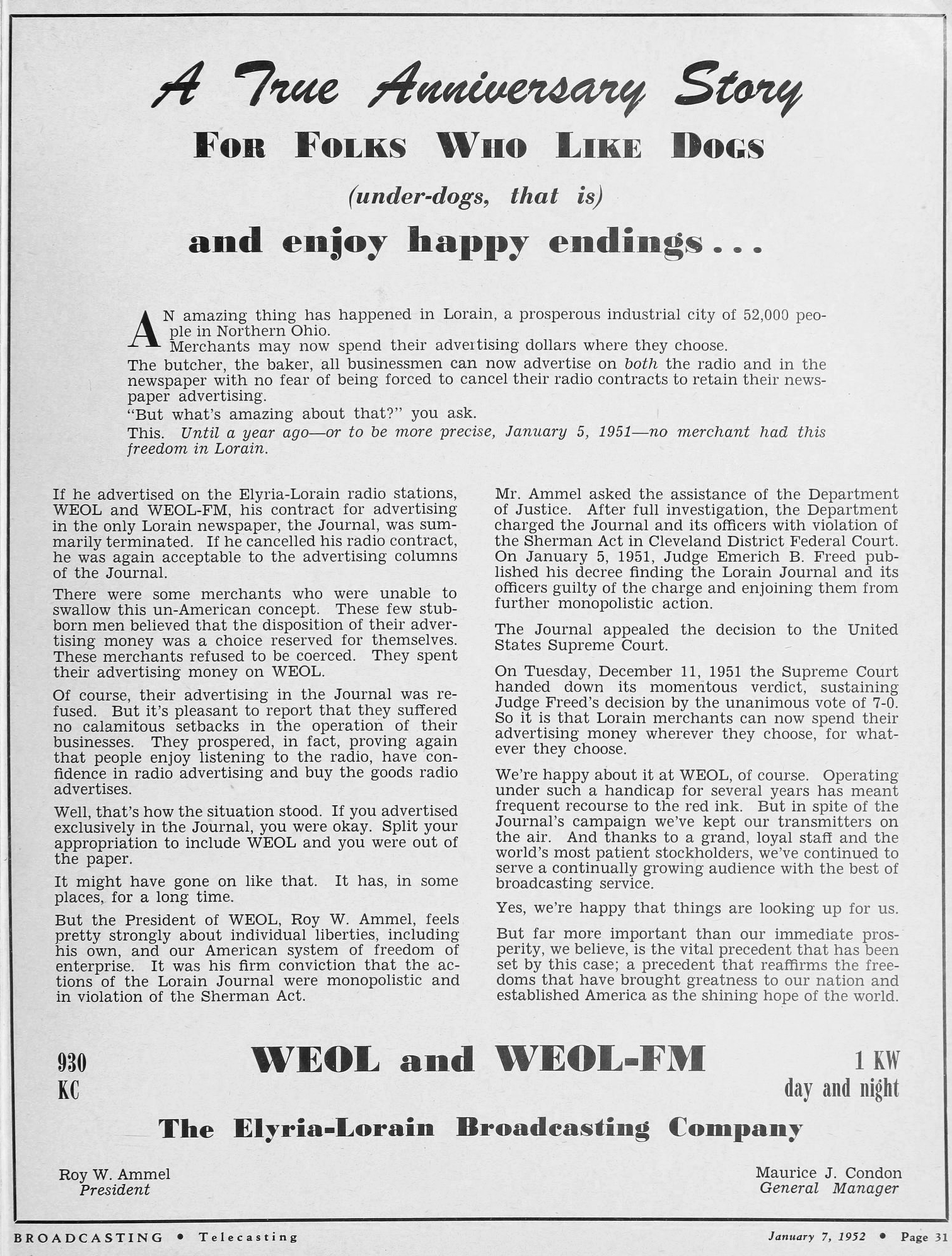
WEOL trade ad in Broadcasting-Telecasting after the U.S. Supreme Court issued Lorain Journal Co. v. United States, affirming the Journal violated the Sherman Antitrust Act in advertising policies against the station in Lorain, Ohio.

Judge Freed issued a memorandum on August 29, 1950, finding the Journal violated key provisions of the Sherman Antitrust Act in an attempt to maintain their near-monopoly on advertising revenue in Lorain. Freed's opinion was combined with the rest of the U.S. Northern Ohio district court the following day. The Journal was additionally found to have acted in a "predatory" and illegal manner and tried to "destroy" WEOL; the Journal vowed to appeal the ruling before the U.S. Supreme Court. A proposed U.S. Justice Department decree sought to forbid the Journal, News-Journal or the Horvitz family from purchasing any competing paper or radio station in Lorain or Mansfield, which the Journal called "repugnant". As part of Freed's final ruling, an injunction was placed on the Journal forbidding them on refusing advertising from anyone that advertised with WEOL, and was required to publish a weekly notice to readers "in a conspicuous location" for 26 weeks. The Supreme Court upheld Freed's decision in Lorain Journal Co. v. United States, argued on October 17, 1951, and decided unanimously on December 11, 1951.

=== Treble damages lawsuit and license challenge ===
Prior to the Supreme Court ruling, Elyria-Lorain sued the Journal seeking $984,000 in treble damages, triple the amount of revenue lost due to the Journal's advertising policies. In a front-page editorial, the Journal decried the Elyria Telephone Company—who they claimed controlled WEOL due to Ammel's management—and the Ohio Independent Telephone Association as "true monopolies", assailing the litigation as a tactic to silence the paper over their coverage of rate increases. WMAN then sued the News-Journal for $1.8 million in treble damages, alleging they were subject to the same policies against advertisers.

The Journal and News-Journal filed challenges to WEOL and WMAN's broadcast licenses when both came up for renewal in late September 1955, claiming both stations pirated stories, circulated and broadcast false information to injure the newspapers, and questioned if they fulfilled program commitments made to the FCC. The piracy allegations followed Journal editor Don Miller's arrest on November 20, 1952, after assaulting WEOL newscaster James Cochran at the Antlers studios; Miller claimed Cochran read a Journal story about a proposed highway on-air before the paper was to be printed. WEOL denied the charges and accused Samuel A. Horvitz and the Journal of a history of trying to "eliminate and any all competition". After being designated for hearing, the FCC denied the challenges and renewed the licenses for both on December 19, 1956.

Horvitz died in 1956; by the time WEOL's lawsuit went to trial on May 16, 1960, the executors of Horvitz's estate took his place as defendants. The Journal's treasurer was the lone witness the newspaper called to the stand, and stated WEOL experienced revenue gains throughout 1949, 1950 and 1951. Judge James C. Connell initially ruled in favor of the Journal, citing a failure by the station to prove any damages to revenue occurred. After the Ohio District Courts of Appeals ordered a retrial, Connell reversed his ruling on February 6, 1964, in favor of WEOL, but only awarded the station $30,000. WEOL appealed the judgement to the Ohio District Court as inadequate, Connell was overruled and another retrial was ordered, with the appeals court implying a different judge oversee it. The case was settled in 1967 with $96,000 awarded to WEOL; the WMAN lawsuit never went to trial and was settled one year later.

=== The WEOL-TV channel 31 permit ===
In August 1952, Elyria-Lorain applied to operate a television station on UHF channel 31, allocated to Lorain; the application came after the FCC's self-imposed "freeze" on television station permits was lifted. The Journal filed a competing application but withdrew in December 1953. Eventually designated as WEOL-TV, Elyria-Lorain requested six deadline extensions between 1954 and 1958; the Journal's editorial page derided the proposed station as "completely mythical and hypothetical after more than four years of make-believe" and the FCC as "[making] itself a party to a continuing fraud against the public". The delays with constructing WEOL-TV factored in the Journal's license renewal challenge against WEOL, as the paper claimed the station made "false and misleading statements" applying for the permit and sought to prevent the Journal from winning.

WEOL-TV's permit was cancelled on February 19, 1960, as one of seven unbuilt UHF stations in Ohio and 54 nationwide. The Lorain channel 31 allocation was later reopened and claimed by United Artists to construct WUAB on channel 43.

=== Purchase by LCP&P and the Journal-WWIZ license fight ===
The Lorain County Printing and Publishing Company (LCP&P), publishers of the Elyria Chronicle-Telegram, purchased all Elyria-Lorain stock held by Roy Ammel—a 23 percent ownership stake—for $214,200 on April 1, 1958. LCP&P president Otto Schoepfle called the transaction an opportunity for the Chronicle to extend itself into broadcasting and denied it had anything to do with WEOL's then-ongoing lawsuit against the Journal. After the deal closed, Schoepfle was named president of Elyria-Lorain; by August 1958, WJMO manager Paul Nakel was hired as WEOL general manager. In February 1959, the Journal purchased what was initially reported as "a minority interest" of Lorain station WWIZ, but the money went to fund the station's construction in exchange for nonvoting and voting preferred stock, making it an ownership transfer without FCC knowledge or authorization. The FCC later cited this as an attempt by the Journal to gain a competitive advantage against WEOL. When the Journal attempted to buy WWIZ outright in 1961, Elyria-Lorain objected, and the FCC designated WWIZ's license for hearing.

The roles were reversed when LCP&P sought to acquire Elyria-Lorain stock held by the Loren M. Berry foundation in September 1964, giving it positive control over the company. While the FCC approved the stock transfer, the Journal filed to block it. The FCC designated both the sale and WEOL's license renewal for hearing by September 1965 on potential media concentration issues in Elyria, with Elyria-Lorain facing a possible $10,000 fine. The Journal withdrew from the case before the evidentiary review began when a request to examine documents, some dating back to 1946, was denied, and the examiner ruled in favor of LCP&P and WEOL. The stock transfer and license renewal were approved by the FCC on October 6, 1966. The FCC, however, declined to renew WWIZ's license in 1964, which ceased broadcasting in July 1967.

== Full-service years ==
WEOL had a reputation as a training ground for future Cleveland announcers, and retrospectively described as "a real hot rocker" in the 1950s. Ron Penfound was news and sports director from 1950 to 1953 before finding fame as children's television host "Captain Penny" at WEWS. Joe Mayer, later with WHK and WGAR, was advised by then-general manager Maurice Condon over a two-year process on how to be an announcer before the station hired him. Ronnie Barrett co-hosted a show with brother Dick Barrett from 1953 to 1955 prior to joining WGAR. Dick Conrad, later with multiple Cleveland stations, worked at WEOL from 1955 to 1959. Jeff Baxter worked at WEOL from 1956 to 1958, frequently hosting sock hops, including one with Conrad in Chatham-Kent, Ontario; Baxter was best known as sidekick to Jack Riley at WERE. While at WEOL, Baxter discovered rockabilly singer Laura Lee Perkins after she broke out into a song when visiting the station's studios, helped secure her a record deal, and became her manager and legal guardian. Neil Zurcher was news director in the early 1960s while also doing part-time work for WJW-TV; his reporting on the 1965 Palm Sunday tornado outbreak and demonstrations at Oberlin College led to WJW hiring him as a reporter.

WEOL-FM began airing separate programming in select hours in 1958. On February 24, 1966, WEOL-FM was relaunched as WBEA with an easy listening format; this followed a transmitter upgrade that boasted 100,000 watts of power and a coverage area of 500 square miles (1,300 km^{2}). The WBEA call sign stood for Bea Nakel, Paul Nakel's wife. WBEA's format changed in 1983 to contemporary hits as "B-107". WBEA was converted on January 1, 1987, to WCZR, featuring a hard rock and heavy metal format targeting Greater Cleveland but maintained studios in Elyria alongside WEOL. WCZR switched formats again on November 15, 1987, to new-age/smooth jazz as WNWV; WNWV remained in Elyria-Lorain ownership until December 2011, when it was acquired by the Rubber City Radio Group.

Initially an independent station, WEOL affiliated with the Mutual Broadcasting System in 1967, and with ABC Radio in 1968. In 1982, WEOL and WBEA moved to new studios on 538 Broad Street, again in Elyria's downtown. WEOL began broadcasting in C-QUAM AM stereo on September 1987 following upgrades to the station's transmitter equipment; the station continued to use AM stereo as late as 1993.

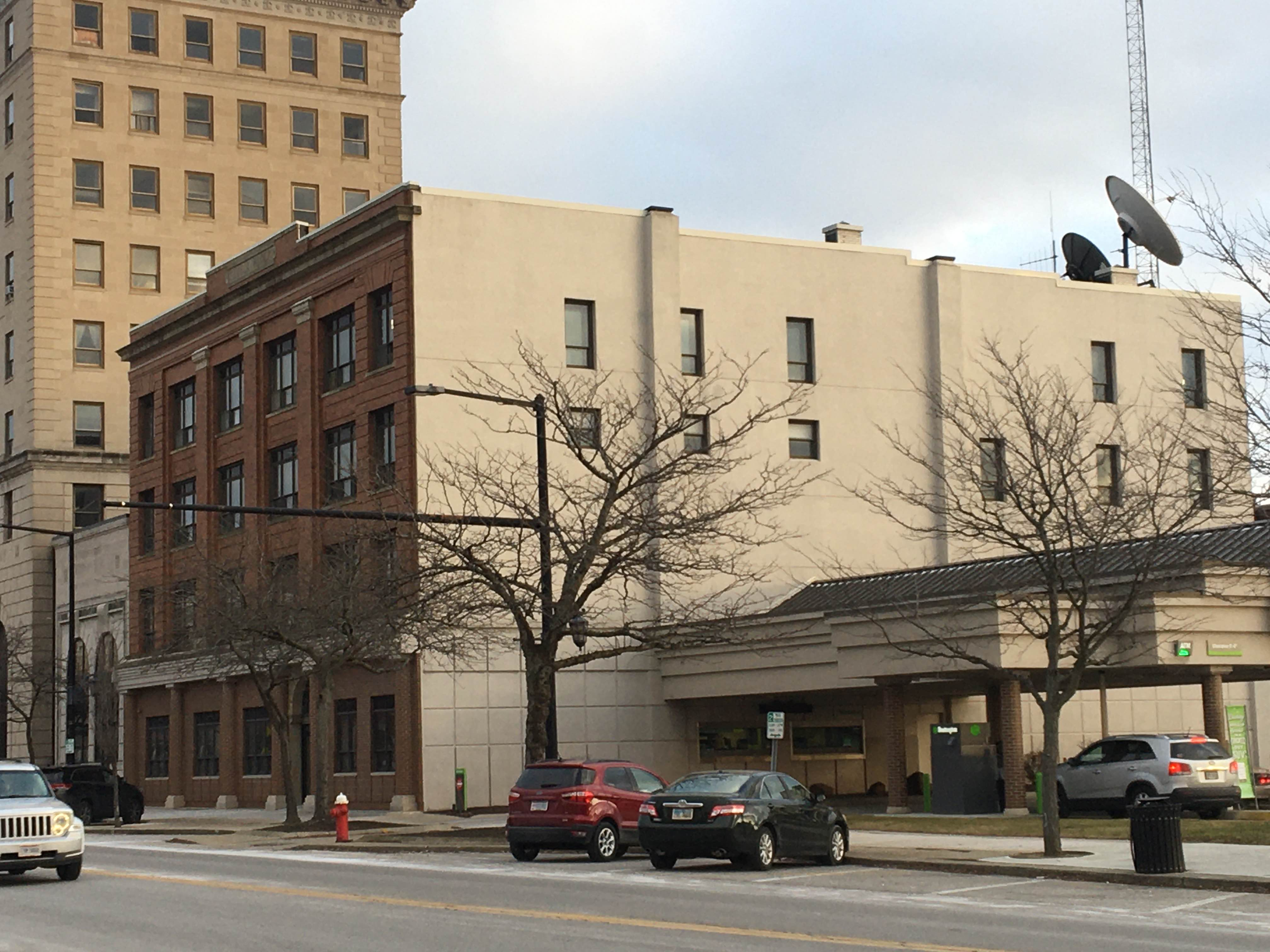
WEOL's former studios on Broad Street in downtown Elyria

Paul Nakel retired in December 1984 and was succeeded as general manager by Gary Kneisley, who held the role until retiring in January 2006. Mike Whitmore joined WEOL in 1980 under the on-air name "Mike James" and became program director with Kneisley's arrival. Aside from a brief hiatus in 1990 following a heart attack, Whitmore hosted morning drive on the station for over 13 years. Wally Mintus joined WEOL in 1984 to host overnights and later became sports director and lead sportscaster, which he held until leaving in 2004. Mintus' overnight show was replaced with automation in 1994, but was restored several months later due to listener demand. Jim Allen's daily high school sportscasts moved to WEOL in 1990 following an ownership change at WRKG, and Tim Alcorn was hired for play-by-play duties in 1992 after leaving WOBL. The station had such a strong emphasis on sports coverage by the mid-1990s that evenings were hosted by a rotation of part-timers. WEOL's news and sports departments were the recipient of multiple state press club awards throughout the 1990s and 2000s; Whitmore once remarked, "[w]e're running out of wall space and that's kind of nice for a change".

Beginning in 1991, Jim Mehrling hosted The High School Scholastic Games of Lorain County, a spin-off of a high school quiz show Mehrling presented on WERE. The Scholastic Games aired over WEOL on a recurring basis for 35 years. Mehrling's association with WEOL dated back to 1969 and he was the station's chief announcer in the mid-1970s alongside public affairs director David Mark; Mark later served as announcer for The Scholastic Games.

== Talk and information era ==
WEOL dropped all music programming on November 28, 1997, for a hybrid format: all-news in the daytime largely supplied by the Associated Press, and sports in the nighttime via One on One Sports. Mike Whitmore, whose morning show was retained, said the move was partly made because of a decline of music listening on the AM dial, noting, "[w]e never were a music station". Whitmore left the station in March 1998; Bill King—with the station since 1996—took over for him in mornings, while news director Craig Adams became operations manager. While the format initially eschewed talk radio, by 2003, WEOL carried syndicated hosts Clark Howard and Mitch Albom, along with The Other Side of Morning Drive, a late-morning local interview program.

WEOL picked up The Glenn Beck Program in May 2005, several weeks after WTAM dropped it; The Other Side was also cancelled and King was replaced as morning host by Les Sekely, a former comedy writer. Beck's addition came after a re-assessment of the all-news format by station management. The station also affiliated with Fox Sports Radio on July 16, 2005, for evenings and weekends. Distribution of Albom's show ended on January 2006, with WEOL replacing it with The Sean Hannity Show. Sekely's show was the lone local program remaining on WEOL's schedule by May 2008 as the station's noon news block was phased out. The Laura Ingraham Show replaced Beck on November 3, 2008, after WTAM reacquired the rights to Beck's program; Ingraham was replaced with The Stephanie Miller Show on April 30, 2012. Sekely left the station in 2010 for a teaching position with the Westlake City School District.

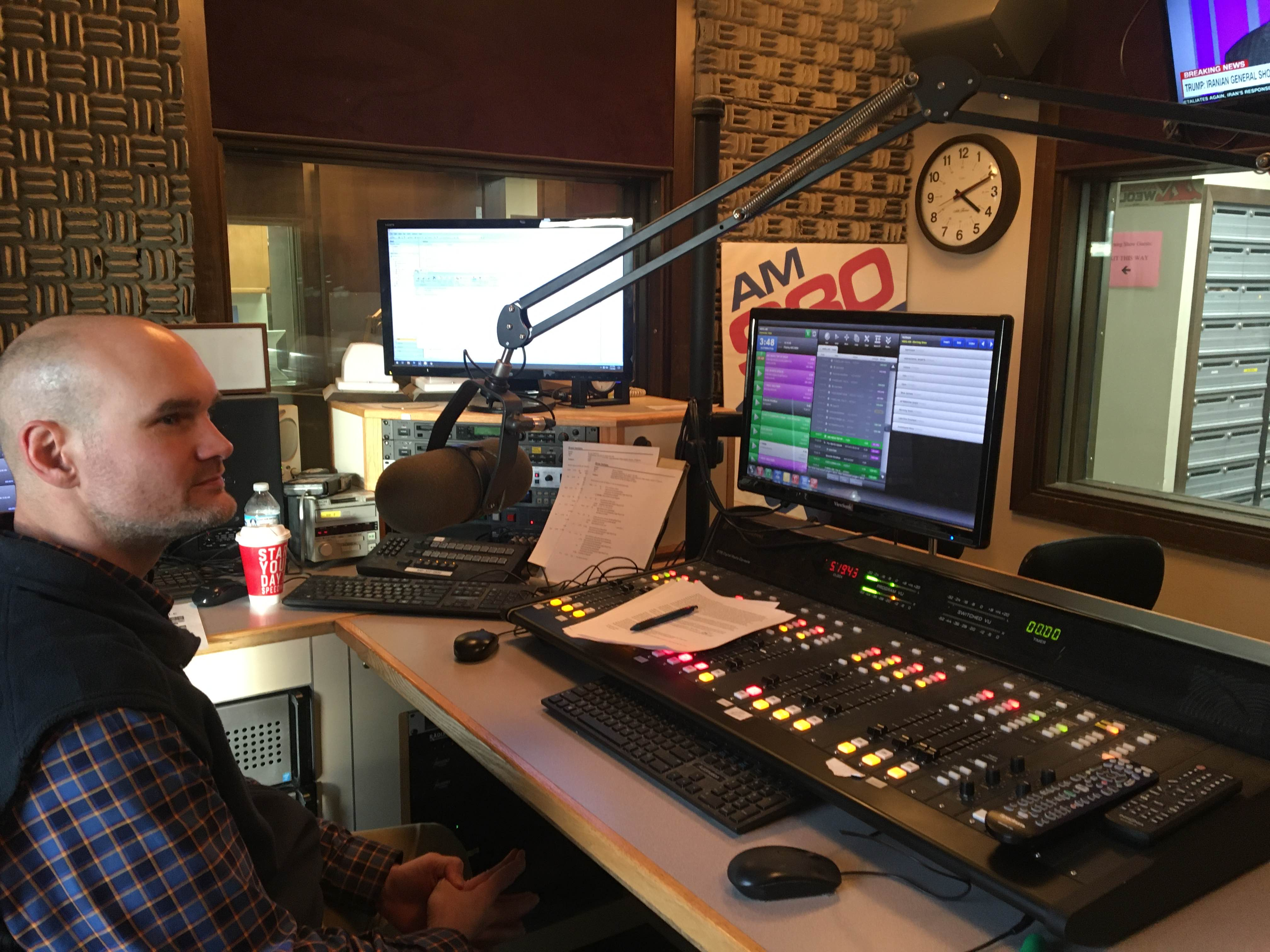
WEOL main air studio with afternoon host Andy "Bull" Barch, January 2020

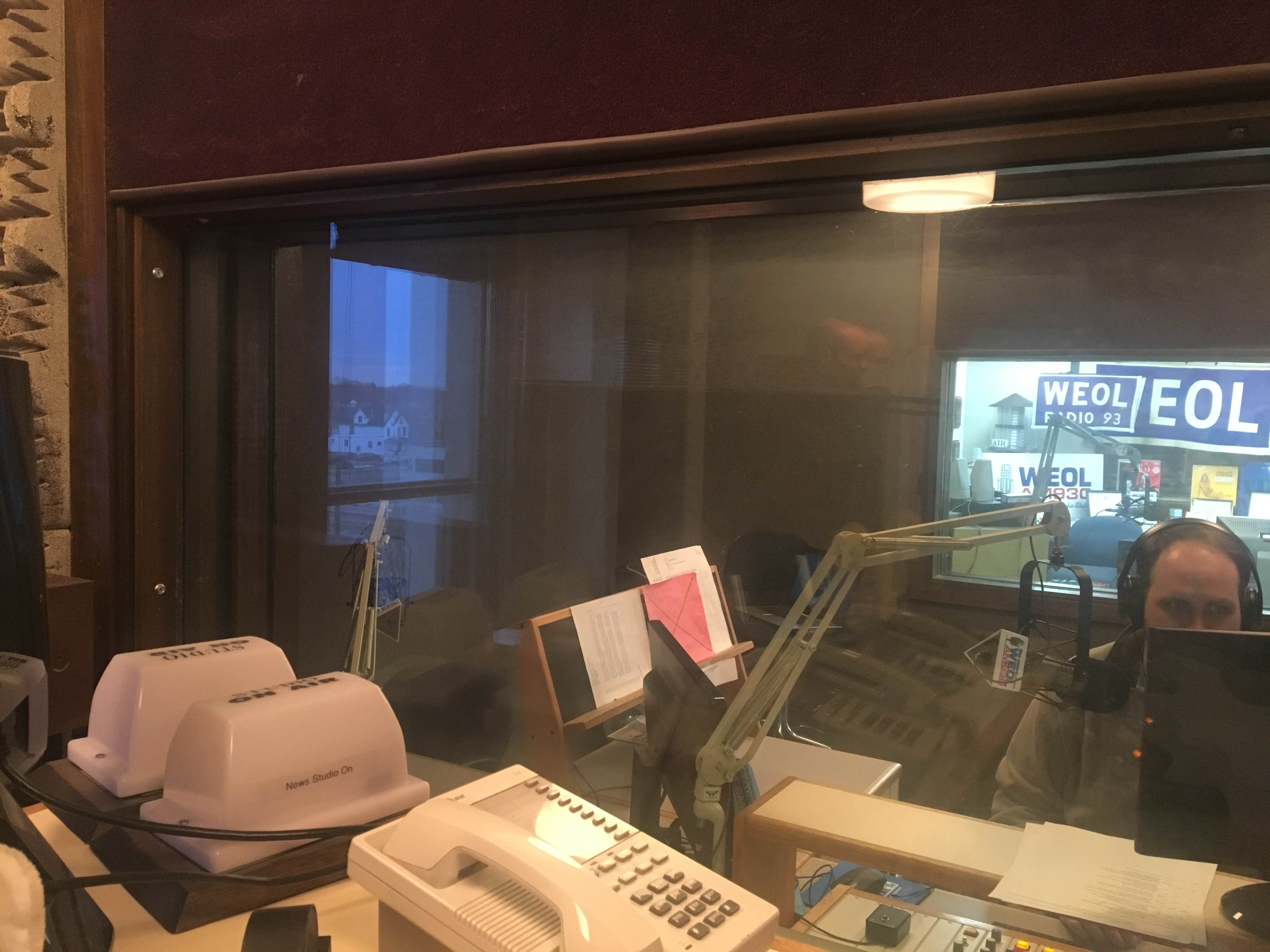
WEOL news studio with anchor Matt Douglass, February 2019

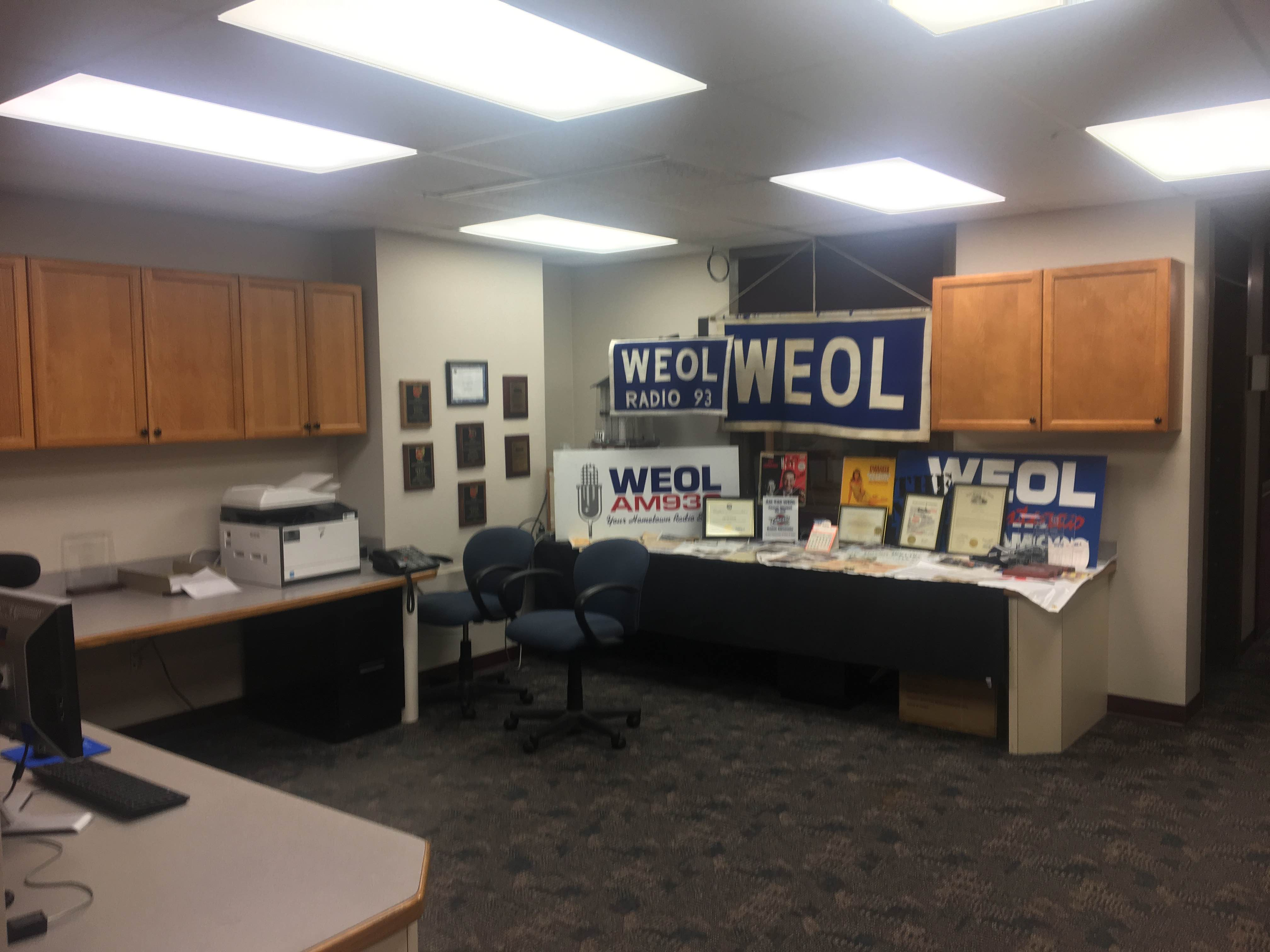
WEOL newsroom with various station memorabilia, February 2019

Tim Alcorn was elevated to station operations manager in the mid-2010s; under Alcorn, WEOL launched a local news/interview program hosted by Andy "Bull" Barch in February 2017, replacing Hannity. Alcorn left the station in October 2019 to become the radio voice of the Cleveland Cavaliers; Joe Tait, the Cavaliers' first radio voice, frequently called high school basketball and softball games for the station alongside Alcorn, and lobbied for the team to hire him. Tait additionally co-hosted a podcast for WEOL until his 2021 death, featuring recordings from his tape archive. Barch's afternoon show ended in October 2020. By 2013, Craig Adams and Bruce Van Dyke co-hosted the morning show, which ended in December 2023.

== Switch to Catholic radio ==
There’s a lot of equity in the WEOL brand, we’ve been around for over 75 years... The heart and soul [of the station] is local sports and community news and we can still carry the mission forward doing it online.

— Bill Hudnutt, president, Lorain County Printing and Publishing Company

On May 31, 2025, Elyria-Lorain Broadcasting announced the sale of WEOL's license to St. Peter the Rock Media, owner of Catholic radio station and EWTN Radio affiliate WCCR (1260 AM); the station became a WCCR repeater the next day. Elyria-Lorain and LCP&P retained WEOL's intellectual property and call sign with the sale, and concurrently announced WEOL's local programming—primarily high school sports coverage—would only be available online with new studios at the Chronicle-Telegram offices. The license sale and online streaming model had been under consideration for 18 months, and followed the Chronicle's conversion to an online newspaper. WEOL's broadcast of weekly services from the Elyria First United Methodist Church, heard over the station since 1958, was also dropped but moved to WOBL the following month.

The sale closed on September 12, 2025. St. Peter the Rock Media subsequently changed the call sign to WNCR, effective December 8.

== FM translator ==
WNCR has been rebroadcast over Elyria, Ohio, translator W262DM (100.3 FM) since August 2, 2019. The translator was applied for as part of the FCC's "AM Revitalization" initiative.

Broadcast translator for WNCR
Call sign	Frequency	City of license	FID	ERP (W)	HAAT	Class	Transmitter coordinates	FCC info
W262DM	100.3 FM	Elyria, Ohio	202991	25	196.48 m (645 ft)	D	41°16′10.2″N 82°0′15.5″W	LMS

Signal contours for WNCR and associated translator.; Daytime groundwave 2 mV/m signal for WNCR; Grade A 60 dBu signal for W262DM
