= WCCR (AM) =

Catholic radio station in Cleveland

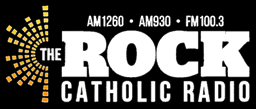
- Cleveland, Ohio; United States
- Broadcast area: Greater Cleveland; Northeast Ohio
- Frequency: 1260 kHz
- Branding: The Rock Catholic Radio

Programming
- Language: English
- Format: Religious (Catholic)
- Affiliations: EWTN Radio

Ownership
- Owner: St. Peter the Rock Media, Inc.
- Sister stations: WNCR

History
- First air date: April 30, 1950
- Former call signs: WDOK (1950–1965); WIXY (1965–1976); WMGC (1976–1978); WBBG (1978–1987); WMJI (1987–1988); WRDZ (1988–1995); WMIH (1995–1998); WWMK (1998–2015)
- Call sign meaning: "Cleveland Catholic Radio"

Technical information
- Licensing authority: FCC
- Facility ID: 17015
- Class: B
- Power: 10,000 watts (day); 5,000 watts (night)
- Transmitter coordinates: 41°17′10.00″N 81°38′34.00″W
- Repeater: 930 WNCR (Elyria)

Links
- Public license information: Public file; LMS
- Webcast: Listen live
- Website: rockcatholicradio.com

WCCR (1260 AM) is a commercial radio station licensed to Cleveland, Ohio, United States, featuring a Catholic–oriented religious format known as "The Rock". Owned by St. Peter the Rock Media, Inc., a nonprofit corporation which has applied for 501(c)(3) tax–exempt status with the Internal Revenue Service, WCCR serves Greater Cleveland as the local affiliate for EWTN Radio. WCCR's studios are located in the Cleveland suburb of Broadview Heights and the station transmitter resides in neighboring Brecksville. In addition to a standard analog transmission, WCCR is simulcast full-time over WNCR (930 AM) in Elyria and is available online.

== History ==
=== WDOK ===
The station began on April 30, 1950, as WDOK when Wayne Mack resigned his position at WGAR (1220 AM) to establish the station with Frederick C. Wolf and chief engineer Morris Pierce, who became station president. Wolf himself was a longtime ethnic broadcaster on Cleveland stations WHK, WJAY, and WGAR, in addition to being the founder of Cleveland Recording Co. for the production of spot commercials, nationality music, and auditions.

Early programming was highlighted by Wayne Mack's imaginary concert programs, such as "Hometown Band Concert", "Candlelight Concert", and "Waltz Palace". WDOK's format was soon simulcast full-time on WDOK-FM 102.1. Throughout the 1950s and early 1960s, the station maintained a format of adult standards, although it did buck contemporary music trends by broadcasting two hours of classical music programming each night. By 1957, WDOK also was the radio home for 18 different nationality programs, most of them broadcast on Sundays. Wolf sold his stake in WDOK and WDOK-FM to Transcontinent Television Corp. of New York in 1962.

Meanwhile, across town in the early 1960s, top–40 radio was flourishing led by KYW and WHK. In July 1964, three account executives at WHK Norman Wain, Bob Weiss, and Joe Zingale – quit their jobs to form Westchester Corporation. They purchased WFAS in White Plains, New York (located in Westchester County, hence Westchester Corporation) in December 1964, and honed their skills in running a top–40 station. They returned to Cleveland the following year and purchased WDOK and WDOK-FM in November 1965.

=== WIXY 1260 ===
On December 12, 1965, the AM station changed its call sign to WIXY, branding itself as WIXY 1260 (pronounced "Wicksy Twelve-Sixty"). The new call sign was similar to WXYZ in Detroit – and which also used the "Wixie" nickname – and also was selected for its rhyming with the 1260 frequency. The initial on-air lineup included Al Gates, Howie Lund, Johnny Michaels, Johnny Canton, Mark Allen, and Bobby Magic. Allen later moved on to Chicago's WCFL under the name Bob Dearborn. The news staff included Bob Engel, Fred Griffith, and Gary Ritchie.

WIXY soon began to dominate top–40 radio in Cleveland, despite having a weaker signal than either WKYC (formerly KYW) or WHK. In 1966, WIXY sponsored The Beatles' second concert in Cleveland on August 14. (WHK had sponsored the first concert in 1964). DJs who are remembered for their stint at WIXY during the late 1960s and early 1970s include Chuck Dunaway, and Jackson Armstrong (Big Jack Armstrong "Your Leader").

WDOK-FM was, however, left untouched and still programmed by Wayne Mack. When Westchester Corporation saw the growing and devoted listener base that their largely ignored FM station was developing, WDOK was branded "Stereo Cleveland – Beautiful Music for the land of the Western Reserve". While the FM station soon passed over into separate ownership, Wayne Mack stayed at WDOK until 1980, and died in October 2000.

In 1969, Westchester Corporation took the format to the Pittsburgh market, purchasing WMCK in suburban McKeesport, Pennsylvania, and changing the calls to WIXZ. The Pittsburgh-area station used the same graphics and jingles as the Cleveland station – it was called "WIXZ 1360" (pronounced "Wick-zee Thirteen Sixty") – but failed to impact Pittsburgh as it had Cleveland, putting only a dent in the dominance of top–40 leader KQV. The top–40 format at WIXZ lasted in various forms until 1974, and the call letters remained in place until it became talk station WPTT in 1999.

The local ownership of WIXY was gobbled up by larger communications corporations in the 1970s. Wain, Weiss, and Zingale merged Westchester Corporation into Globetrotter Communications for $14.3 million in December 1971. Combined Communications (later Gannett) purchased Globetrotter in May 1975.

"WIXY 1260" exists today as an online tribute station based in the Cleveland area airing the original PAMS jingles and classic 1960s and 1970s hits.

=== Talk, oldies, big band ===
With the emergence of FM radio, the era of AM top–40 radio drew to a close. On July 19, 1976, WIXY became WMGC (or "Magic"), and the format switched to "adult rock", an early iteration of what would become known as adult contemporary. The station adopted the slogan "Get Your Rock Soft", which raised some eyebrows when it appeared in ads and billboards around town. Although it never caught on with a large audience, WMGC was home to several of the area's top broadcasters, including general manager Dick Conrad, Program Director Jeff Baxter, and DJs Dan Bradford, Kristy Phillips, and Lady J. Also on the air as the most popular of the WMGC personalities was Dave Sanderson. In reality, Sanderson was well-known local broadcaster David Mark, who had to assume the Sanderson name due to contractual obligations to WKSW-FM and WEWS-TV.

The adult rock format lasted less than three years. On April 14, 1979, the station became WBBG and switched to talk radio, under the name "SuperTalk 1260". The original lineup included several veteran Cleveland radio personalities Bill Gordon, Merle Pollis, Ted Alexander, Bill Randle, Ed Fisher, Bruce Drennan with Sportstalk, and Cynthia Smith with the overnight program NightFlight 1260.

WBBG's talk format never caught on, so the station turned to an oldies format briefly before finding success with a big band-based music format programmed by local radio veteran Jim Davis. The station enjoyed much success including "Billboard Station of the Year" (for its format) in 1983 with a nomination of "Program Director of the Year" going to Davis. During its glory years (July 1981–October 1987), on-air talent, in addition to Davis, included Al James, Tom Armstrong, Bill Randle, Carl Reese, Ronnie Barrett, Dick Conrad, John Webster, Ted Alexander, Joe Black, and Jack Reynolds.

Ownership of WBBG and sister FM station WWWM passed from Embrescia Communications (led by Tom Embrescia) to Robinson Communications (led by local civic leader and jeweler Larry Robinson) on October 27, 1981. (WWWM's call sign changed to WMJI six months later). Robinson, in turn, sold the stations to media giant Jacor Communications on September 19, 1984.

WBBG's call letters (originally stood for "Boys from Bowling Green") soon took the meaning "Big Band Grandstand".

Jacor, which added clear-channel stations WLW in Cincinnati and KOA in Denver to their portfolio, began negotiating in early 1987 to purchase WWWE from Art Modell. Such a deal required the sale of WBBG, which had less-desirable demographics with adult standards; Jacor considered talk radio to be a more viable long-term format on the AM band. Larry Robinson agreed to re-purchase WBBG in July 1987 for $1.9 million, primarily to preserve the standards format. WWWE evening host Pete Franklin left to join WFAN in New York City, causing Jacor to withdraw their bid, and it and WDOK were purchased by a group led by Tom Embresica, Pollock, and associate Tom Wilson. Jacor switched WBBG to a simulcast of WMJI on October 29, 1987, after the sale to Robinson collapsed.

The AM call sign was changed to WMJI on November 24, 1987, to match the FM station's (which legally became WMJI-FM for the interim). The big band format - and program director Jim Davis - soon migrated over to crosstown station WRMR.

=== Later years ===
Jacor sold the station to Gore-Overgaard Broadcasting, led by Harold W. Gore and Cordell J. Overgaard, for $845,000; Gore-Overgaard planned to relaunch the station as a 24/7 Christian radio station, the first such station in the area. WCCD in Parma already had a Christian format, but operated during the daytime hours only. WMJI's call sign was changed to WRDZ on July 1, 1988; Jacor reserved the calls to prevent WCKY in Cincinnati from adopting them in an attempt to lure Cincinnati Reds broadcasts away from WLW. Jacor executive Randy Michaels claimed the usage of WRDZ in Cleveland could stand for "WoRDZ of the Lord".

Under Gore-Overgaard ownership, the station received permission to double its daytime power from 5,000 to 10,000 watts, although the upgrade was not accomplished until Divine Mercy Communications, Ltd. purchased and installed the new transmitter provided for in the license change.

Logo as WMIH

In early 1995, the station was purchased by Divine Mercy Communications Ltd., and it brought the format of Catholic programming. Under new call letters WMIH (for Mary's Immaculate Heart), which were adopted on February 23, 1995, the station was purported to be the first commercial Catholic radio station in the country.

The station inaugurated its new format on February 22 by broadcasting a noon mass live from St. John's Cathedral celebrated by Bishop Anthony Pilla. Regular programming centered on a live morning drive-time program called Genesis, hosted by Fr. Wally Hyclack and Cleveland broadcast veteran Bob Tayek, which featured NBC Radio news and local newsmaker interviews, and an evening drive program, named "Homeward Bound", with a local call-in format on current topics.

Midday programming included a live, local, two-hour talk show called Ave Maria, a local information and spiritual support program called the Living Word with Cleveland nun Sr. Juanita Sheely, broadcasts of various Catholic speakers, in a program called Catholic Classroom, which included Bishop Fulton J. Sheen's programs from the 1950s. In addition, the station produced live daily mass from St. John's Cathedral and carried regular installments of the English versions of Vatican broadcasts.

WMIH also produced live play-by-play coverage of Saint Ignatius High School football and basketball games, both home and away, as well as live remotes from Cleveland-area Catholic events, such as the Feast of the Assumption in Cleveland's Little Italy. The station also provided its own live, on-location coverage of Pope John Paul II's entire trip to New York and Baltimore in 1995, with coverage anchored by owner Steve Kurdziel and local reports from Cuyahoga County Commissioner Lee Weingart.

=== Radio Disney AM 1260 ===
Despite the innovative programming produced by WMIH, and the devoted listenership from the Catholic community in Cleveland, Divine Mercy ended up having serious financial trouble in maintaining that original programming, which emphasized local hosts and remote coverage of sports and other events.

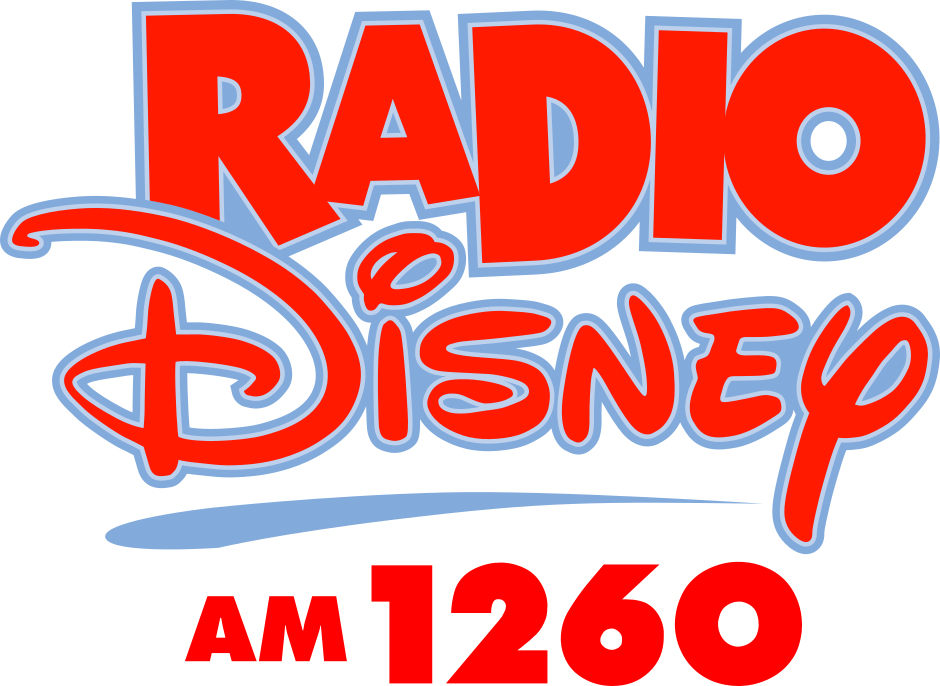
WWMK logo used from 2002 until 2007.

At the same time, ABC Radio was looking for an outlet for its Radio Disney in the Cleveland market, and it purchased the station. It took over the station on May 1, 1998, and the call sign was changed to WWMK on December 4.

On August 13, 2014, Disney put WWMK and 22 other Radio Disney stations up for sale, to focus on digital distribution of the Radio Disney network.

=== AM 1260 The Rock ===
On December 24, 2014, the station was sold to St. Peter the Rock Media, a nonprofit company created by former Akron attorney Patrick D'Andrea and Cleveland attorney Gerald Monroe. They announced the station would become an EWTN Radio affiliate, with a Catholic format under the branding AM 1260 The Rock - returning it to its prior format before the Radio Disney buyout. The new ownership group originally targeted April 2015 for the format switch, but later was changed for May. On April 24, 2015, WWMK disaffiliated from Radio Disney, and went silent. St. Peter the Rock Media took over the station on May 4, upon consummation of the purchase from Radio Disney at a price of $895,000. On May 7, 2015, the station changed the call sign to WCCR, and a few days later on May 11, the station began its format.

== Repeater station ==
St. Peter the Rock Media announced their purchase of WEOL in Elyria from the Elyria-Lorain Broadcasting Co. on May 31, 2025, for an undisclosed amount; WEOL and associated low-power translator W262DM (100.3 FM) became a WCCR repeater the following day. Elyria-Lorain retained WEOL's intellectual property for a streaming platform centered on high school sports coverage. The sale closed on September 12, 2025. St. Peter the Rock subsequently changed the call sign to WNCR on December 8.
