= 1935 Cleveland mayoral election =

Cleveland mayoral election, 1935
- November 5, 1935
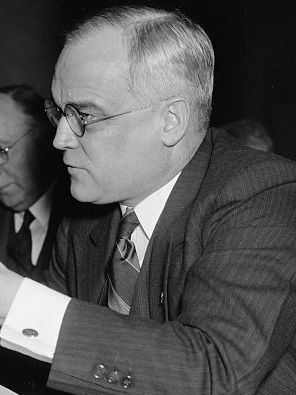

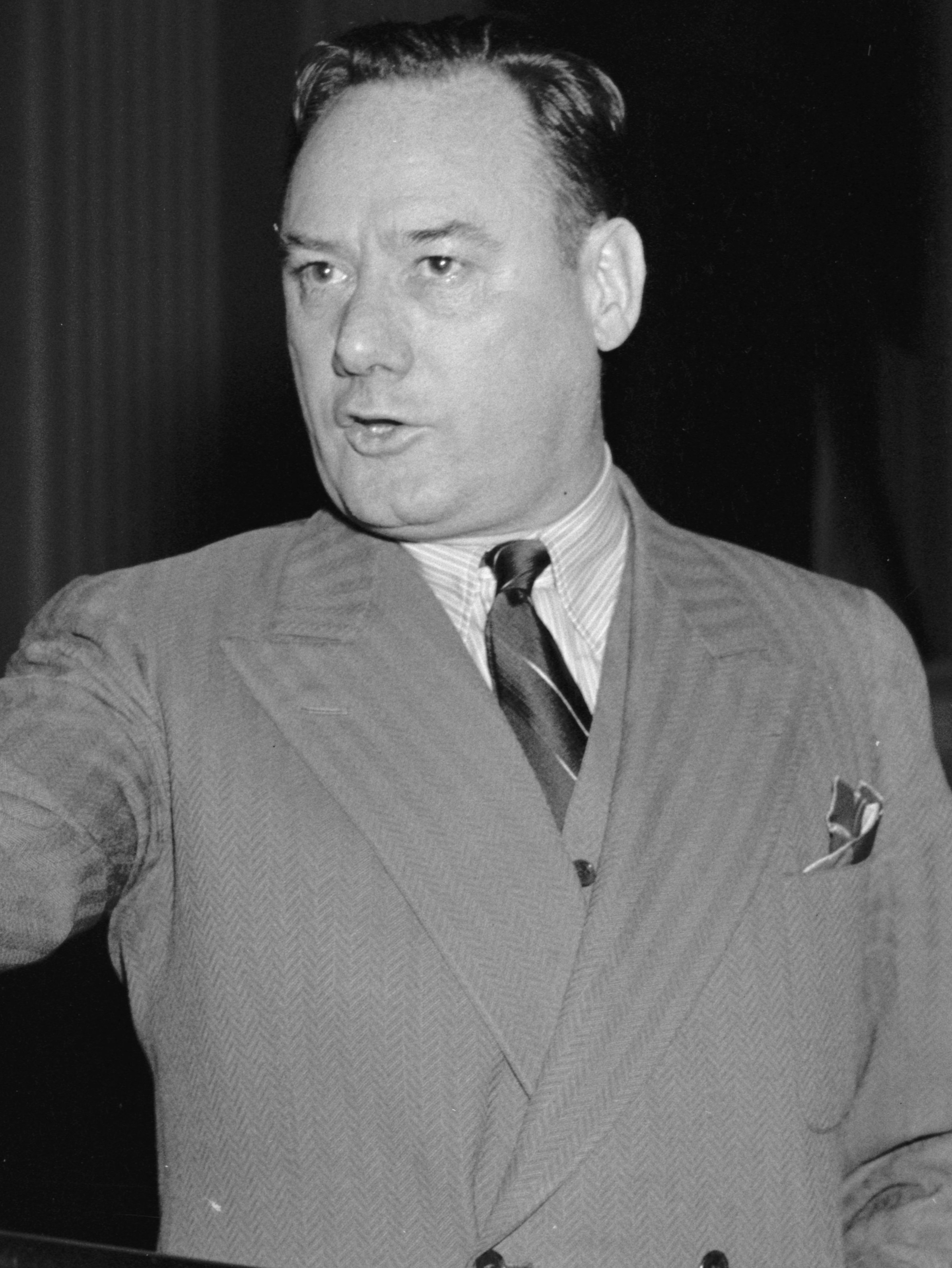
Nominee	Harold Hitz Burton	Ray T. Miller
Party	Republican	Democratic
Popular vote	154,144	115,114
Percentage	57.25%	42.75%
Mayor before election
Harry L. Davis
Republican
Elected mayor
Harold Hitz Burton
Republican

The Cleveland mayoral election of 1935 saw Harold Hitz Burton defeat former mayor Ray T. Miller.

== General election ==
1935 Cleveland mayoral election (general election)
Party	Candidate	Votes	%
Republican	Harold Hitz Burton	154,144	57.25%
Democratic	Ray T. Miller	115,114	42.75%
Turnout		269,258	
