= WXTV (Ohio) =

Television station in Youngstown, Ohio (1960–1962)

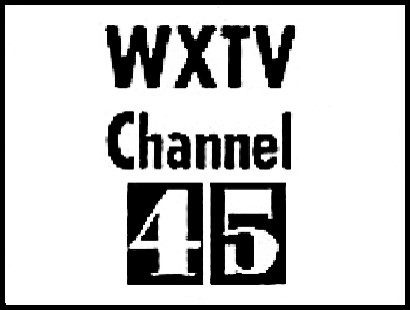
- Youngstown, Ohio; United States
- Channels: Analog: 45 (UHF)

Programming
- Affiliations: Independent

Ownership
- Owner: Community Telecasting Company

History
- First air date: November 15, 1960
- Last air date: February 27, 1962

Technical information
- ERP: 8.13 kW
- HAAT: 330 ft (101 m)
- Transmitter coordinates: 41°4′21″N 80°38′23″W

WXTV (channel 45) was an independent television station licensed to Youngstown, Ohio, United States, from November 15, 1960, to February 27, 1962. The station was owned and operated by Sanford Schafitz. Mounting issues with the license renewal of a co-owned radio station in Lorain, WWIZ, in which Schafitz had sold a stake to obtain capital to start WXTV, led to the station's closure.

== History ==
=== Allocation change and construction ===
The construction permit for WXTV was granted to the Community Telecasting Company in November 1955, to telecast on channel 73, and the call letters WXTV were quickly granted. Still unbuilt, the station modified its application in December 1956 to specify channel 45. The Federal Communications Commission (FCC), however, instead let channel 45 remain in the hands of WKST-TV of New Castle, Pennsylvania, which at the time was not broadcasting; the FCC denied a protest by Community against the move. The next year, it considered, then dropped, a plan to move the channel 73 allotment to Pittsburgh and substitute channel 33 for WXTV's use.

Ultimately, the two stations' fight for lower channel positions was resolved by letting WKST-TV move to channel 33 (and change its city of license to Youngstown), giving WXTV permission to operate on channel 45 once it was vacated. In early 1960, an application to transfer the station's construction permit from Community Telecasting to WXTV, Inc., both owned by Sanford A. Schafitz and Guy W. Gully, was held up by the FCC when WKST-TV petitioned against the move, saying the permittees were not legally or financially qualified; while the FCC dismissed the petition as moot, it decided to look into the charges.

=== On the air ===
WXTV began regular programming on November 15, 1960, with six hours of programming, including three movies.

In addition to films, WXTV aired some local programming. In January 1962, it started a children's show hosted by John "Dusty" Boyd. A local live music show titled "45 Hop" in the format of American Bandstand aired on weeknights as early as 1961, hosted by WHOT (1570 AM) personality Al DeJulio; the program later inspired a similar program on WYTV hosted by fellow WHOT personality "Boots" Bell.

Having made one channel change already before going on air, WXTV tried to change positions again when it filed to move to channel 15, allocated to Ashtabula, Ohio, but WICA-TV's license was still in force.

=== Signing off ===
On February 28, 1962, WXTV did not sign on for the day; a station staffer asked by The Vindicator reported that channel 45 was having technical difficulties. The station failing to telecast for the day came just days after the FCC had ordered a hearing into all of Schafitz's broadcast holdings, which included WWIZ in Lorain and WFAR in Farrell, Pennsylvania. The FCC announced that issues to be raised in the hearing included an unauthorized transfer of control at the Lorain radio station and misrepresentations relating to Schafitz's employment at WXTV. The hearing also revealed that the unreported sale of a minority stake in WWIZ was undertaken in order to raise $55,000 in capital to build channel 45. For channel 45—whose transfer to WXTV, Inc. was still pending—there was an additional reason to deny WXTV its license: co-owner Gully was an indicted felon, making him unfit to hold a broadcast license. While hearing examiner Chester F. Naumowicz, Jr., found that Schafitz was unaware of Gully's indictment until after the applications were filed, his failure to provide the information still precluded granting the license. The full commission agreed and denied the license application in April 1964; at the same time, it denied the renewal of WWIZ radio's license.

The channel 45 allocation remained in Youngstown in the 1965 UHF table revision. It was moved to Alliance as part of a 1971 application by the Ohio Educational TV Network Commission to build new educational TV stations at Alliance and Akron to be jointly operated by Kent State University, the University of Akron, and Youngstown State University, which went on the air as WNEO in 1973.
