= 1940 United States Senate election in Ohio =

- November 5, 1940
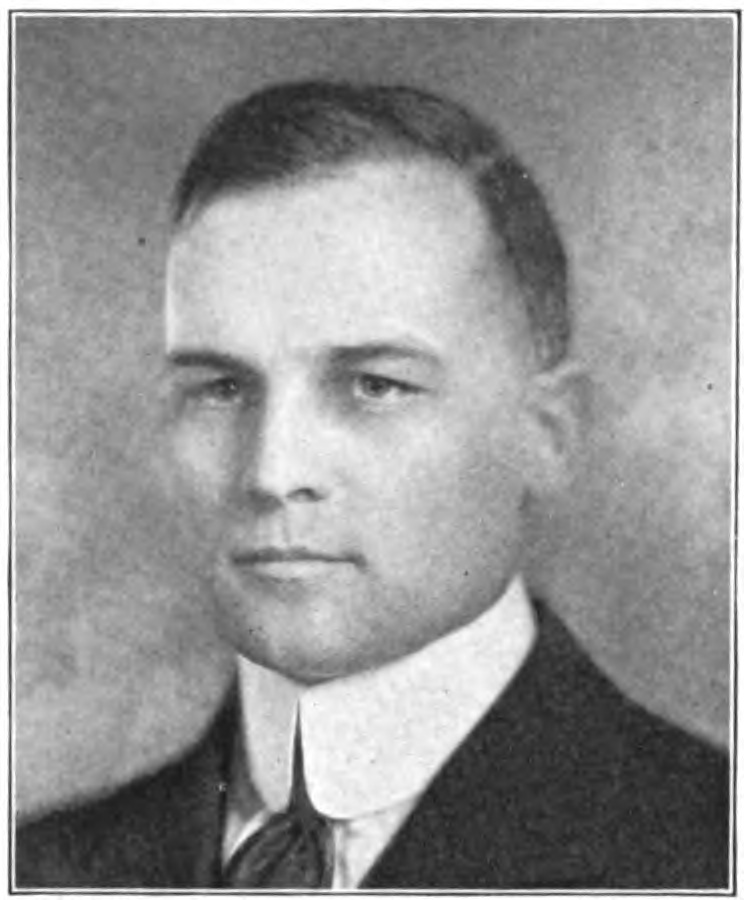

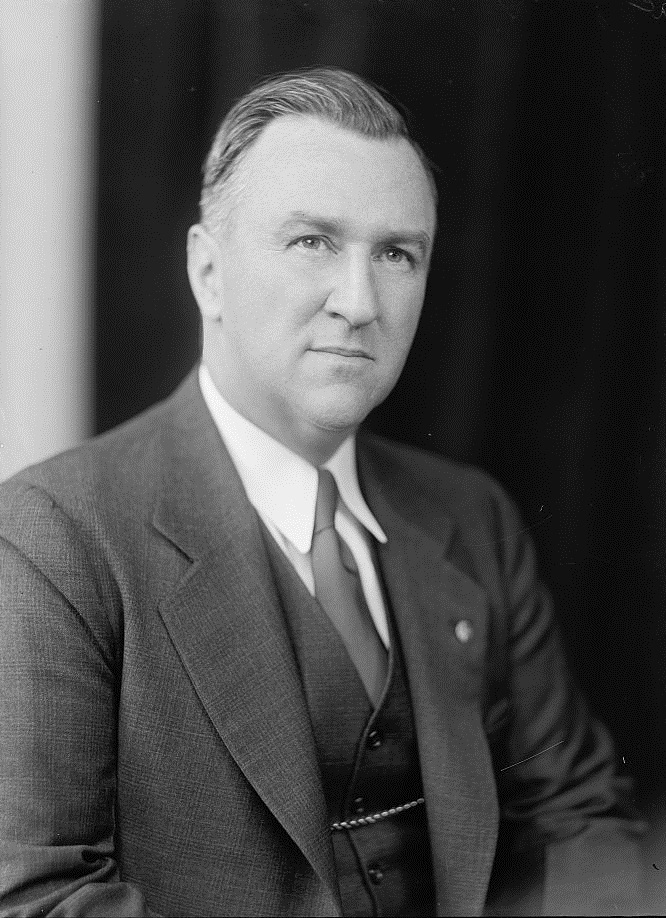
Nominee	Harold Burton	John McSweeney
Party	Republican	Democratic
Popular vote	1,602,498	1,457,304
Percentage	52.37%	47.63%
- County results Burton: 50–60% 60–70% 70–80% McSweeney: 50–60% 60–70%
U.S. senator before election
Vic Donahey
Democratic
Elected U.S. Senator
Harold Hitz Burton
Republican

The 1940 United States Senate election in Ohio took place on November 5, 1940. Incumbent Democratic Senator Vic Donahey did not run for re-election to a second term. In the open race to succeed him, Republican Mayor of Cleveland Harold Hitz Burton defeated Democratic U.S. Representative John McSweeney.

== Democratic primary ==
=== Candidates ===
- Herbert S. Bigelow, former U.S. Representative from Cincinnati (1937–39)
- John McSweeney, former U.S. Representative from Wooster (1923–29, 1937–39)

=== Results ===
1940 Democratic Senate primary
Party	Candidate	Votes	%
Democratic	John McSweeney	272,690	61.62%
Democratic	Herbert S. Bigelow	169,818	38.38%
Total votes		442,508	100.00%

== Republican primary ==
=== Candidates ===
- Harold Hitz Burton, Mayor of Cleveland
- Charles E. Wharton
- Dudley A. White, U.S. Representative from New London

=== Results ===
1940 Republican Senate primary
Party	Candidate	Votes	%
Republican	Harold Hitz Burton	303,339	52.85%
Republican	Dudley A. White	235,344	41.01%
Republican	Charles E. Wharton	35,258	6.14%
Total votes		573,941	100.00%

== General election ==
=== Results ===
1940 U.S. Senate election in Ohio
Party	Candidate	Votes	%	±%
Republican	Harold Hitz Burton	1,602,498	52.37%	▲12.96
Democratic	John McSweeney	1,457,304	47.63%	▼12.32
Total votes		3,059,802	100.00%	
Republican gain from Democratic				

== See also ==
- 1940 United States Senate elections
