= Lorain Journal Co. v. United States =

- Supreme Court of the United States

Argued October 17, 1951 Decided December 11, 1951
- Full case name: Lorain Journal Company, et al v. United States
- Citations: 342 U.S. 143 (more) 72 S. Ct. 181; 96 L. Ed. 162

Case history
- Prior: Injunction granted, 92 F. Supp. 794 (N.D. Ohio 1950); probable jurisdiction noted, 71 S. Ct. 743 (1951).

Court membership
- Chief Justice Fred M. Vinson Associate Justices Hugo Black · Stanley F. Reed; Felix Frankfurter · William O. Douglas; Robert H. Jackson · Harold H. Burton; Tom C. Clark · Sherman Minton

Case opinion
- Majority: Burton, joined by unanimous

Laws applied
- Sherman Antitrust Act

Lorain Journal Co. v. United States, 342 U.S. 143 (1951), is a decision of the United States Supreme Court that is often cited as an example of a monopolization violation being based on unilateral denial of access to an essential facility although it in fact involved concerted action. When the Lorain Journal monopoly over advertising in the Lorain, Ohio, area was threatened by the establishment of a competing radio station, the newspaper's publisher refused to accept advertising from those who advertised over the radio station and required them to advertise only in the Journal. The purpose of the publisher was to eliminate the competition of the radio station. The Supreme Court held that the publisher had attempted to monopolize trade and commerce in violation of § 2 of the Sherman Antitrust Act and was properly enjoined from continuing its conduct.

== Background ==
The Lorain Journal Company, the defendant, published a newspaper, the Journal. For some years, it maintained "a commanding and an overpowering" position in the area and reached 99% of the families in the city. It was the only daily newspaper and carried a substantial amount of local and national advertising.

Until 1948, the Journal enjoyed a monopoly "of the mass dissemination of news and advertising, both of a local and national character." In 1948, however, the FCC licensed the Elyria-Lorain Broadcasting Co. to operate a radio station, WEOL, in the Elyria, Oberlin, and Lorain area, in Ohio. Many of the local advertisers in the Journal wanted to use WEOL as well. The newspaper developed a plan to eliminate the competition from WEOL by refusing to accept local advertisements from any Lorain County advertiser who advertised or appeared to be about to advertise over WEOL.

The Journal monitored WEOL programs to determine the identity of the station's local Lorain advertisers. Those using the station had their contracts with the newspaper terminated, and they could renew them only after ceasing to advertise through WEOL. As a result, many Lorain County merchants either ceased advertising or abandoned their plans to advertise over WEOL. The district court found that "the very existence of WEOL is imperiled by this attack upon one of its principal sources of business and income."

The district court therefore found a violation of Section 2 of the Sherman Act and enjoined the Journal from continuing its program of refusing to deal with advertisers who advertised in WEOL and requiring advertisers to advertise only in the newspaper. The publisher appealed to the Supreme Court.

== Decision ==
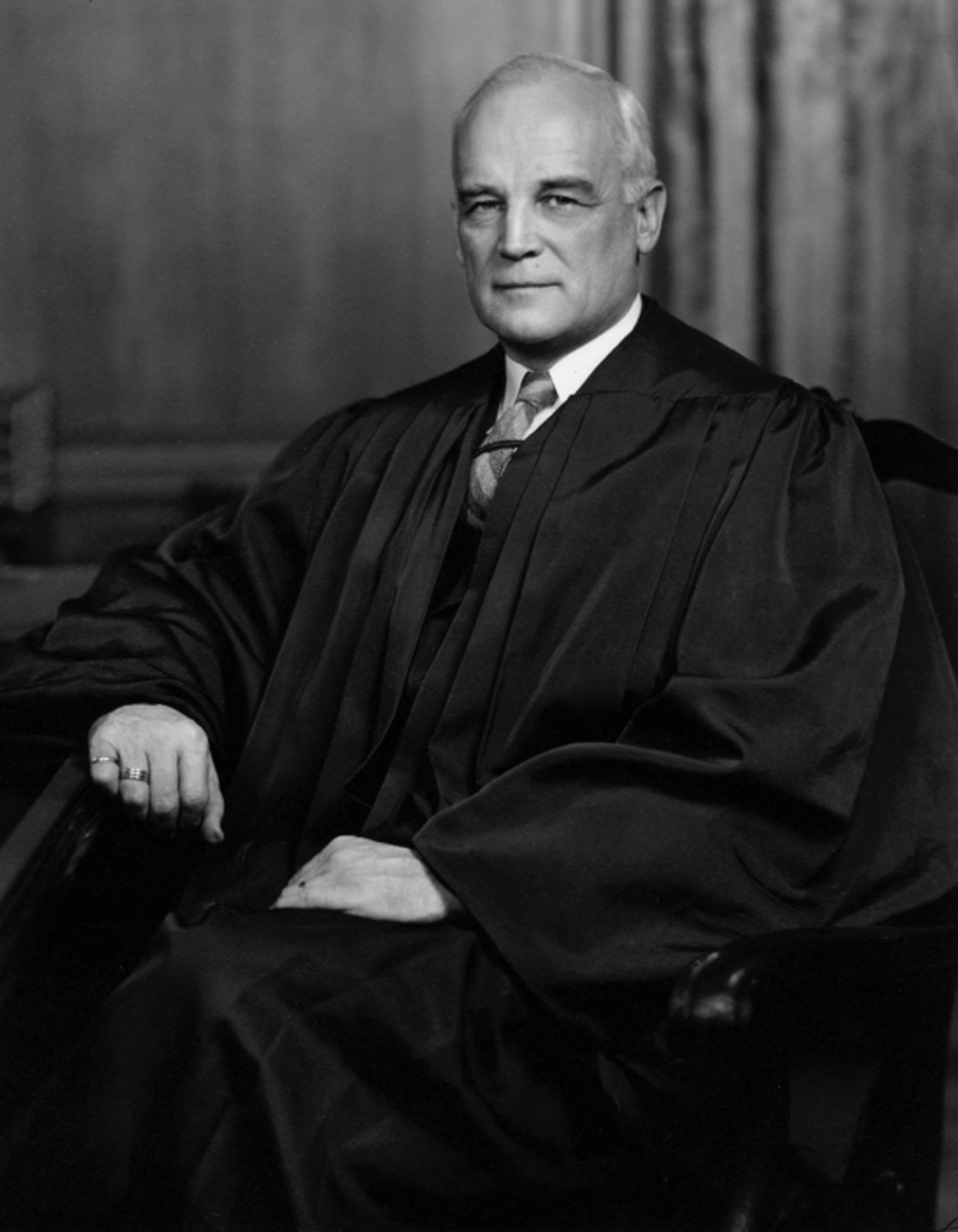
Justice Harold H. Burton delivered the opinion of the Court.

Justice Harold H. Burton delivered the unanimous opinion of the Court that the newspaper's publisher attempted to monopolize in violation of Section 2 of the Sherman Act and was properly enjoined from continuing to do so.

The Court found the most important among the facts supporting the district court's judgment to be that the Journal enjoyed a nearly complete monopoly in Lorain from 1933 to 1948 and had a 99% coverage of Lorain families. "Those factors made the Journal an indispensable medium of advertising for many Lorain concerns." Accordingly, its

refusals to print Lorain advertising for those using WEOL for like advertising often amounted to an effective prohibition of the use of WEOL for that purpose. Numerous Lorain advertisers wished to supplement their local newspaper advertising with local radio advertising, but could not afford to discontinue their newspaper advertising in order to use the radio.

The Court said it was clear that "if all the newspapers in a city, in order to monopolize the dissemination of news and advertising by eliminating a competing radio station, conspired to accept no advertisements from anyone who advertised over that station," their boycott conspiracy would violate Sections 1 and 2 of the Sherman Act, as had bien held in such cases as Fashion Originators' Guild v. FTC. The Court continued, "It is consistent with that result to hold here that a single newspaper, already enjoying a substantial monopoly in its area, violates the 'attempt to monopolize' clause of § 2 when it uses its monopoly to destroy threatened competition."

The Journal sought to excuse its conduct on the ground that it has a "right as a private business concern to select its customers and to refuse to accept advertisement from whomever it pleases." The Court said that such a right is not unqualified:

The right claimed by the publisher is neither absolute nor exempt from regulation. Its exercise a purposeful means of monopolizing interstate commerce is prohibited by the Sherman Act. The operator of the radio station, equally with the publisher of the newspaper, is entitled to the protection of that Act.

== Commentary ==
A note in the Virginia Law Review focused on the fact that the Court found an attempted monopolization of interstate commerce even though the Journal attempted to monopolize the advertising of only local merchants and did not refuse or try to monopolize the business of national advertisers because of their dealings with the radio station:

In this sense the monopoly was confined to the limits of a single city. This was nevertheless a forbidden monopoly, as the successful destruction of competition in local business by forcing the station to close would also have destroyed competition in interstate business, i.e., the national advertising carried by both the newspaper and the radio station. Thus the case is useful to point out again that the suppression of local competition is not free from the threat of prosecution under the Sherman Act simply because an intrastate and not an interstate monopoly is contemplated.

Charles Barber points to a contradiction or disconnect in the case law regarding specific intent in cases of this type, especially as interpreted in Times-Picayune Publishing Co. v. United States, the specific intent behind the refusal to deal, a purpose to eliminate a competitor or a purpose to create or maintain a monopoly, was a major theme in finding a § 2 Sherman Act violation. In Lorain Journal, the district court had found that the purpose and intent of the Journal's refusals to sell "was to destroy the broadcasting company." In Times-Picayune, the Court held that monopolization did not occur because there was no showing of specific intent to destroy competition or build monopoly, and the newspaper's challenged practice was legal because it was predominantly motivated "by legitimate business aims." The Court distinguished the Lorain Journal case on the ground that there the newspaper's refusal to sell space to advertisers who advertised on the local radio station manifested "bold, relentless, and predatory commercial behavior," which was absent in the Times-Picayune case. Barber maintains that the Court's "emphasis on specific intent suggests that it regarded this as controlling" on the monopolization issue. However, Barber insists, United States v. Griffith, which is quoted in both Lorain Journal and Times-Picayune, "held that specific intent is no longer an element of the offense of monopolization under Section 2."

Barber therefore concludes:

The cases reviewed above indicate that the courts are groping for an appropriate rationale of the monopoly provisions of the Sherman Act which, while limiting the freedom of a trader unduly to exploit trade advantages stemming from his market position, will assure the preservation of his essential freedom to develop his business, including his supplier and customer relationships, in accordance with his personal business judgment.

Donald Turner observed in the Harvard Law Review that the Supreme Court was "unquestionably correct" in holding the conduct of the Journal as an unlawful attempt to monopolize under section 2 of the Sherman Act. Nonetheless, if the Court had been asked to do so, it could properly "also have held that each seller [merchant contracting for advertisements] who complied with Lorain Journal's demands became party to an agreement with Lorain Journal to boycott the radio station." The only problem with that would be "the seeming unfairness of subjecting the coerced sellers to criminal penalties." It would be a mistake, however, Turner argued, to hold, as in Interstate Circuit, Inc. v. United States or United States v. Parke, Davis & Co., "that the sellers, each being aware that others would also cease patronizing the radio station, have agreed with each other to carry on a collective boycott [emphasis added]" because

the decision of each seller was apparently wholly independent of the decisions of the others; each decision simply reflected an economic choice, forced by the newspaper's policy, as to which advertising medium could be dispensed with at least cost, a choice wholly unaffected by what other sellers might choose to do.

In Interstate Circuit, for example, "there was ample evidence . . . to support a finding of horizontal agreement of the most obvious sort, including the significant evidence that the consequence of imposing limitations on the movie chains' subsequent-run competitors had been to increase not only the profits of the chains but also the profits of each distributor." In the Lorain Journal case, each acquiescent merchant "ended up worse off than before." Such an agreement "would be an odd sort of agreement." In such a case, it would be more sensible to proceed against the instigating party who "coerced those with whom he dealt" under a theory of attempted monopolization, as the Court did in the Lorain Journal case.

Finally, Turner emphasizes:

In Lorain Journal, for example, the principal culprit was clearly the newspaper which instigated the boycott of the radio station. The advertisers who dealt with the paper, and who acquiesced in its demands, were unwilling participants. Moreover, the situation can be remedied, as indeed it was in Lorain Journal, by [the government's] proceeding against the instigator alone; freed of the unlawful pressures, the other parties would presumably revert to the nonrestrictive decisions they made before. These considerations might well and properly be taken into account by an enforcement agency in deciding whom to charge and whom not to charge with a violation of the act.
