= Times-Picayune Publishing Co. v. United States =

- Supreme Court of the United States

Argued March 11, 1953 Decided May 24, 1953
- Full case name: Times-Picayune Publishing Co. v. United States
- Citations: 345 U.S. 594 (more) 73 S. Ct. 872; 97 L. Ed. 2d 1277; 1953 U.S. LEXIS 2716

Case history
- Prior: 105 F. Supp. 670 (E.D. La. 1952); probable jurisdiction noted, 73 S. Ct. 173 (1952).

Holding
- A publisher selling only combined insertions appearing in both its morning and evening papers does not violate the Sherman Act

Court membership
- Chief Justice Fred M. Vinson Associate Justices Hugo Black · Stanley F. Reed; Felix Frankfurter · William O. Douglas; Robert H. Jackson · Harold H. Burton; Tom C. Clark · Sherman Minton

Case opinions
- Majority: Clark, joined by Vinson, Reed, Frankfurter, Jackson
- Dissent: Burton, joined by Black, Douglas, Minton

Laws applied
- Sherman Antitrust Act

Times-Picayune Publishing Co. v. United States, 345 U.S. 594 (1953), is an antitrust law decision by the United States Supreme Court. In a 5–4 decision it held that a tie-in sale of morning and evening newspaper advertising space does not violate the Sherman Antitrust Act, because there was no market dominance in the tying product.

== See also ==
- List of United States Supreme Court cases, volume 345
- Jefferson Parish Hospital Dist. No. 2 v. Hyde (1984), a case involving "tying arrangements"
- United States v. Loew's Inc. (1962), a case on product bundling
