= Laura Lee Perkins =

American musician (1939–2018)

Laura Lee Perkins (July 20, 1939 – April 6, 2018) was a rockabilly musician. Though not commercially successful, Perkins gained popularity during the European rockabilly revival of the 1970-1990s. She was a member of the Rockabilly Hall of Fame.

== Early life ==
Laura Lee Perkins was born Alice Faye Perkins in Killarney, West Virginia to Chester and Hazel Perkins. Alice Faye learned to play guitar and piano in her youth. She attended Stoco High School where she also learned to play the trumpet.

== Career ==
Perkins moved to Ohio in 1957 where she met a local disc jockey who sent her demos to his contacts at Imperial Records. Perkins flew to California in February 1958 and recorded with Ricky Nelson's band during sessions at Imperial. The songs produced during these sessions include Don't Wait Up and Kiss Me Baby. The label changed her stage name to Laura Lee Perkins and referred to her as the “female Jerry Lee Lewis” while promoting her 1958 record.

Perkins returned to Ohio and later moved to Detroit in 1959. She continued to perform and tour will several bands. Her early records were never commercially successful, but became highly collectable during the European rockabilly revival. She released the album I’m Back and Here We Go: Laura Lee Perkins, Rockabilly Legend in 2006.

Perkins was a member of the Rockabilly Hall of Fame.

== Personal life ==
Perkins married Neal Kitts in 1963. The couple had three sons.

== Discography ==
=== Singles ===
Year	Song	Label
1958	Kiss Me Baby / I Just Don’t Like This Kind of Living	Imperial Records
1958	Don’t Wait Up / Oh La Baby	Imperial Records
1988	Gonna Rock My Baby Tonight / Come On Baby	Detour Records
	Gonna Rock My Baby Tonight; Come On Baby	Imperial Records

=== Album ===
- 2006: I’m Back and Here We Go!
