= The Morning Journal =

Daily newspaper in Lorain, Ohio, US

- Type: Daily newspaper
- Owner(s): Ogden Newspapers
- Publisher: Larry Dorschner
- Editor: Dorma Tolson
- Founded: Required, year founded, e.g. 1876 or June 1876; see below
- Headquarters: Lorain, Ohio
- Website: morningjournal.com

The Morning Journal is a daily newspaper based in Lorain, Ohio. Originally the Lorain Journal, it was an afternoon paper which was historically more popular in an industrial town like Lorain, but switched to morning publication in the 1980s.

It is the primary paper in the city of Lorain, but also serves the wider area of Lorain, Erie, and Huron counties, and the western Cleveland suburbs.

== See also ==
- Lorain Journal Co. v. United States of 1951
- Milkovich v. Lorain Journal Co. of 1990
