= Mass media in Youngstown, Ohio =

The following is a list of media in Youngstown and the Mahoning Valley in Ohio, United States.

== Print ==
The Vindicator is the sole daily newspaper in the city, currently published as a zoned edition of Warren's Tribune Chronicle in broadsheet. It formerly competed with the Warren-based paper, and the Lisbon-based Morning Journal, although they primarily covered their respective counties, with limited coverage of Mahoning County and Youngstown, until in June 2019 it was announced that The Vindicator would cease publication by mid-August of the same year. Although this newspaper carries the name of the old Vindicator, its scope is comparatively limited, with the majority of previous Vindicator journalists not being carried over to the new edition.

Other newspapers that print in Youngstown include bi-monthly The Business Journal, The Metro Monthly, and the bi-weekly The Jambar, published by the students of Youngstown State University on Tuesdays and Thursdays while classes are in session.

== TV ==
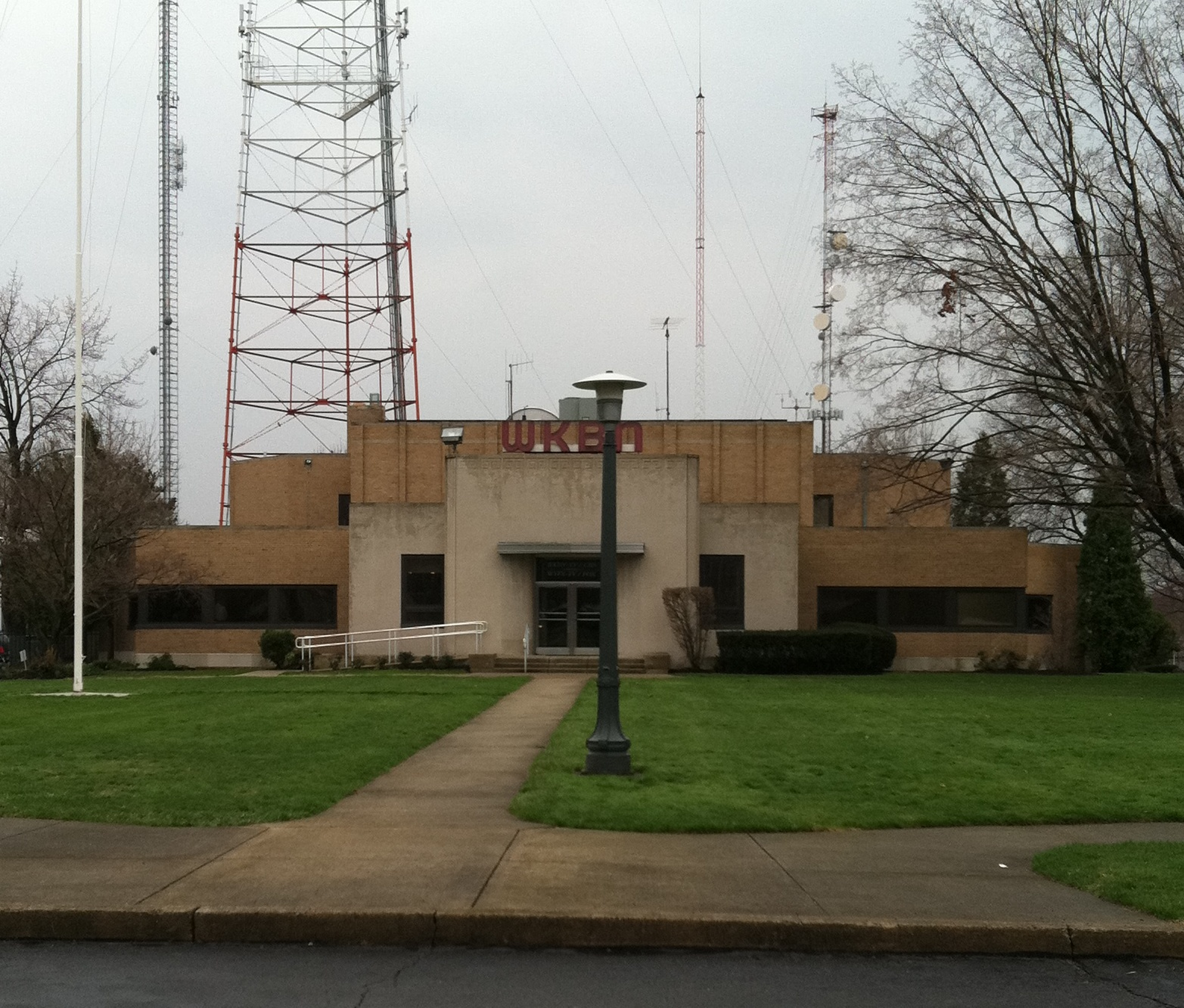
WKBN-TV studio

With 273,480 television households, the Youngstown market is the nation's 106th largest, according to Nielsen Media Research.

The market is served is served by four full power television stations. including WFMJ-TV (channel 21, NBC, with The CW channel 21.2 under the WBCB call letters), WKBN-TV (channel 27, CBS), WYTV (channel 33, ABC, with MNTV on 33.2), and WNEO channel 45 (PBS).

Low power station WYFX-LD channel 62 serves as Youngstown's Fox affiliate, and is simulcast on WKBN 27.2.

== Radio ==
=== AM ===
- 570 WKBN Youngstown (News/talk)
- 600 WRQX Salem (Conservative talk)
- 790 WPIC Sharon, PA (Talk radio)
- 830 WKTX Cortland (Urban contemporary gospel)
- 940 WGRP Greenville, PA (Hot adult contemporary)
- 1200 WKST New Castle, PA (Classic hits)
- 1240 WBBW Youngstown (Sports - Infinity)
- 1280 WUZZ New Castle, PA (Classic country - WYLE simulcast)
- 1330 WGFT Campbell (Urban contemporary)
- 1390 WNIO Youngstown (Sports)
- 1440 WHKZ Warren (Catholic - Relevant Radio)
- 1470 WLOA Farrell, PA (Hip-hop)
- 1540 WYOH Niles (Talk)
- 1570 WYWO Warren (Talk)

=== FM ===
- 88.1 WSRU Slippery Rock, PA (College variety - Slippery Rock University)
- 88.5 WYSU Youngstown (NPR)
- 88.9 WWNW New Wilmington, PA (Adult contemporary - Westminster College)
- 89.5 WILB Boardman (Catholic)
- 90.1 WVMN New Castle, PA (Religious)
- 90.7 WKTL Struthers (Adult album alternative - WAPS semi-satellite)
- 91.7 WYTN Youngstown (Christian - Family Radio)
- 92.1 WKPL Ellwood City, PA (Classic hits)
- 93.3 WNCD Youngstown (Classic rock)
- 95.1 WYLE Grove City, PA (Classic country)
- 95.9 WAKZ Sharpsville, PA (Mainstream urban)
- 96.7 WLLF Mercer, PA (Sports)
- 98.9 WMXY Youngstown (Adult contemporary)
- 101.1 WHOT Youngstown (Contemporary hit radio)
- 101.9 WYLR Hubbard (Contemporary Christian - K-Love)
- 102.9 WYFM Sharon, PA (Classic rock)
- 103.9 WWIZ West Middlesex, PA (Oldies)
- 105.1 WQXK Salem (Country)
- 106.1 WBBG Niles (Country)
- 107.1 WLRF Greenville, PA (Christian adult contemporary - K-Love)
