= Mahoning Valley =

Coordinates: 41°15′N 80°43′W

Mahoning Valley Youngstown–Warren, OH Metropolitan Statistical Area
- Metropolitan Statistical Area
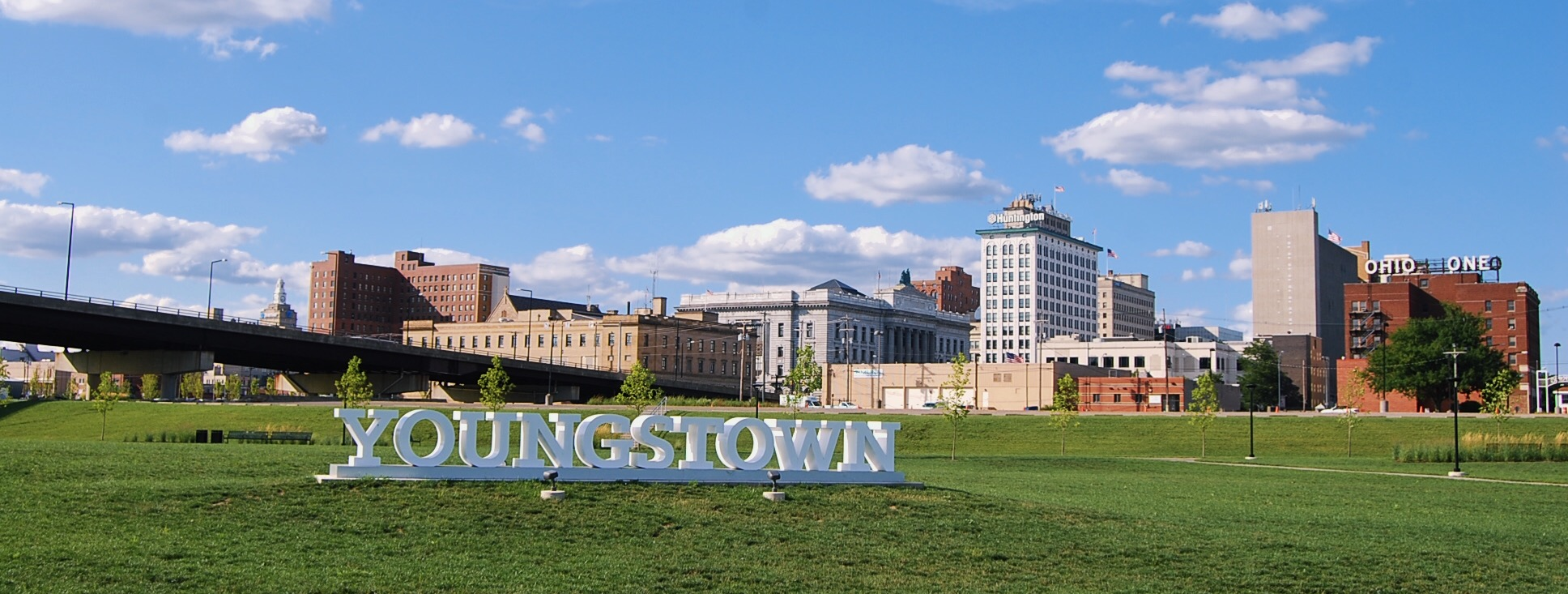
- Downtown Youngstown as viewed from Wean Park
Map of Youngstown–Warren–Salem, OH CSA
Youngstown–Warren MSA
Salem µSA
City of Youngstown
City of Warren
- Country: United States
- State: Ohio
- Largest city: Youngstown
- Other cities: Boardman; Warren; Austintown; Niles; Salem; East Liverpool
- Elevation: 656–3,002 ft (200–915 m)

Population (2020)
  - Urban: 320,901 (US: 127th)
  - Urban density: 1,638/sq mi (632.3/km^{2})
  - Metro: 430,591 (US: 125th)
  - CSA: 532,468 (US: 87th)

GDP
  - Metro: $24.990 billion (2022)
- Time zone: UTC−5 (EST)
  - Summer (DST): UTC−4 (EDT)
- ZIP codes: 4xxxx
- Area codes: 330, 234

The Youngstown–Warren, OH Metropolitan Statistical Area, typically known as the Mahoning Valley, is a metropolitan area in Northeast Ohio with Youngstown, Ohio, at its center. According to the U.S. Census Bureau, the metropolitan statistical area (MSA) includes Mahoning and Trumbull counties. As of the 2020 census, the region had a population of 430,591, making it the 125th-largest metro area in the country.

Taking its name from the Mahoning River, the area has a large commuter population that works in Cleveland and Pittsburgh and their metropolitan areas. It is located in the Rust Belt, the former industrial region of the northern United States. The Youngstown–Warren–Salem combined statistical area adds the Salem micropolitan area and Columbiana County, Ohio to the region, increasing the total population to 532,468. The Youngstown–Warren media market serves all three counties in the CSA, as well as the Pennsylvania counties of Mercer and Lawrence.

== Steel industry ==
Although steel has been produced in the Mahoning Valley since the mid-1800s, after the Civil War, the valley was primarily known for its iron production. Conversion to steel manufacturing began during the economic depression of the 1890s. The Mahoning Valley is suitable for steel manufacture because of "its proximity to the Lake Erie ports that receive iron ore…the coal fields of Ohio, Pennsylvania and West Virginia; and to limestone deposits." The "25-mile stretch of steel mills and related industries" along the Mahoning River is similar to the Ruhr Valley in Germany." Historically, it was part of the largest steel producing region in the world, leading to the historical "Steel Valley" moniker that the area shared with the Pittsburgh metropolitan area.

The local steel industry declined during the 1970s steel crisis. A notable plant closure occurred on September 19, 1977, when Youngstown Sheet and Tube abruptly closed its Campbell Works and furloughed 5,000 workers. Today the area produces little steel, and is home to many scrap metal yards and aluminum plants. A 2009 documentary, Steel Valley: Meltdown, addresses "the past, present and future of the Mahoning Valley" through the eyes of local experts, including one local organizer who stated, "We are the first generation completely removed from the days when steel mills were active."

The Mahoning Valley Economic Development Corporation, founded in 1979, is active in economic revitalization and diversification. It owns two industrial parks, and has purchased local rail lines, including the Youngstown and Austintown Railroad and the Warren and Trumbull Railroad.

== Municipalities ==
Mahoning Valley's cities (dark blue) and villages and boroughs (light blue)

=== Largest municipalities ===
Pop rank	City	County	State	2020 census	2010 census	Change	Peak population (year)
1	Youngstown	Mahoning	Ohio	60,068	66,982	−10.32%	170,002 (1930)
2	Boardman	Mahoning	Ohio	40,213	40,889	−1.65%	42,518 (2000)
3	Warren	Trumbull	Ohio	39,201	41,557	−5.67%	63,494 (1970)
4	Austintown	Mahoning	Ohio	29,594	29,677	−0.28%	33,636 (1980)
5	Niles	Trumbull	Ohio	18,443	19,266	−4.27%	23,072 (1980)
6	Salem	Columbiana	Ohio	11,915	12,303	−3.15%	14,186 (1970)
7	Struthers	Mahoning	Ohio	10,063	10,713	−6.07%	15,631 (1960)
8	East Liverpool	Columbiana	Ohio	9,958	11,195	−11.05%	26,243 (1970)
9	Girard	Trumbull	Ohio	9,603	9,958	−3.56%	14,119 (1970)
10	Campbell	Mahoning	Ohio	7,852	8,235	−4.65%	14,673 (1930)

=== Cities and villages ===
Mahoning County

- Alliance (partly in Stark County)
- Austintown
- Beloit
- Berlin Center
- Boardman
- Campbell
- Canfield
- Craig Beach
- Lowellville
- Maple Ridge
- Mineral Ridge
- New Middletown
- Poland
- Sebring
- Struthers
- Youngstown

Trumbull County

- Cortland
- Girard
- Hubbard
- Newton Falls
- Niles
- Warren
- Lordstown
- McDonald
- Orangeville
- West Farmington
- Yankee Lake

Columbiana County (CSA)

- Columbiana
- East Liverpool
- East Palestine
- Hanoverton
- Leetonia
- Lisbon
- Minerva (primarily in Stark and Carroll Counties)
- New Waterford
- Rogers
- Salem
- Salineville
- Summitville
- Washingtonville
- Wellsville

=== Townships ===
Mahoning County

- Austintown
- Beaver
- Berlin
- Boardman
- Canfield
- Coitsville
- Ellsworth
- Goshen
- Green
- Jackson
- Milton
- Poland
- Smith
- Springfield

Trumbull County

- Bazetta
- Bloomfield
- Braceville
- Bristol
- Brookfield
- Champion
- Farmington
- Fowler
- Greene
- Gustavus
- Hartford
- Howland
- Hubbard
- Johnston
- Kinsman
- Liberty
- Mecca
- Mesopotamia
- Newton
- Southington
- Vernon
- Vienna
- Warren
- Weathersfield

Columbiana County (CSA)

- Butler
- Center
- Elkrun
- Fairfield
- Franklin
- Hanover
- Knox
- Liverpool
- Madison
- Middleton
- Perry
- Salem
- St. Clair
- Unity
- Washington
- Wayne
- West
- Yellow Creek

== Demographics ==
CSA Population
Census	Pop.	Note	%±
1900	185,315		—
1910	245,536		32.5%
1920	353,361		43.9%
1930	445,689		26.1%
1940	462,687		3.8%
1950	515,464		11.4%
1960	616,010		19.5%
1970	644,313		4.6%
1980	644,922		0.1%
1990	600,895		−6.8%
2000	594,746		−1.0%
2010	556,976		−6.4%
2020	532,468		−4.4%
U.S. Decennial Census

As of the census of 2000, there were 602,978 people, 238,319 households, and 162,896 families residing within the MSA, which included Mercer County, Pennsylvania. The racial makeup of the MSA was 86.88% White, 10.78% African American, 0.15% Native American, 0.45% Asian, 0.02% Pacific Islander, 0.55% from other races, and 1.17% from two or more races. Hispanic or Latino of any race were 1.70% of the population.

The median income for a household in the MSA was $36,071, and the median income for a family was $44,055. Males had a median income of $35,626 versus $23,186 for females. The per capita income for the MSA was $18,547.

In July 2023, Mercer County, Pennsylvania was removed from the Youngstown–Warren MSA, renamed the Hermitage, PA Micropolitan Statistical Area and attached to the Pittsburgh-Weirton-Steubenville, PA-OH-WV CSA.

Results from the past four Presidential elections in the Mahoning Valley

=== Metropolitan Statistical Area ===
County	Seat	2025 estimate	2020 Census	Change	Area	Density
Mahoning	Youngstown	224,706	228,614	−1.71%	425 sq mi (1,100 km^{2})	529/sq mi (204/km^{2})
Trumbull	Warren	198,972	201,977	−1.49%	637 sq mi (1,650 km^{2})	312/sq mi (121/km^{2})
Total		423,678	430,591	−1.61%	1,062 sq mi (2,750 km^{2})	399/sq mi (154/km^{2})

=== Combined Statistical Area ===
Statistical Area	2025 estimate	2020 Census	Change	Area	Density
Youngstown–Warren, OH Metropolitan Statistical Area	423,678	430,591	−1.61%	1,062 sq mi (2,750 km^{2})	399/sq mi (154/km^{2})
Salem, OH Micropolitan Statistical Area	99,377	101,877	−2.45%	535 sq mi (1,390 km^{2})	186/sq mi (72/km^{2})
Total	523,055	532,468	−1.77%	1,597 sq mi (4,140 km^{2})	328/sq mi (126/km^{2})

== Transportation ==
=== Airports ===
The Youngstown–Warren area is served by one regional airport:

- Youngstown–Warren Regional Airport

The area is also served by several county and local airports, including:

- Columbiana County Airport
- Koons Airport
- Lansdowne Airport
- Miller Airport
- Salem Airpark
- Warren Airport
- Youngstown Elser Metro Airport
- Youngstown Air Reserve Station

=== Major highways ===
- Interstate 76
- Interstate 80
- Interstate 680
- Ohio Turnpike
- U.S. Route 30
- U.S. Route 62
- U.S. Route 224
- U.S. Route 422
- SR 5
- SR 7
- SR 11
- SR 82
- SR 193
- SR 711

Youngstown is directly served by I-680, which connects the city with Interstate 80, Interstate 76 (the Ohio Turnpike), and State Route 11. I-680 begins at a junction with I-80 and SR 11, the start of the latter two routes' concurrency, in Austintown Township. Traveling southeast, I-680 passes through Youngstown, exiting southward from the city. After running through south suburban communities, it reaches its terminus at the Ohio Turnpike (I-76) in Beaver Township. The SR 711 freeway begins at a junction with I-680 in Youngstown and runs northeast and north out of the city and Mahoning County before terminating at a junction with I-80 and SR 11, the end of the latter two routes' concurrency, in Liberty Township. In addition to non-freeway sections of US 62, US 422, SR 7 and SR 193, state routes SR 170, SR 289, SR 616 and SR 625 serve the city.

The Ohio Turnpike passes to the west and south of Youngstown. Coming from the Cleveland area to the northwest, the turnpike carries Interstate 80 (I-80). In Jackson Township, Mahoning County, approximately 10 miles (16 km) west of Downtown Youngstown, the turnpike has a junction with I-76 (coming from Akron to the west) and the two interstates swap rights-of-way; the turnpike continues to the southeast as I-76, on its way toward Pittsburgh. I-80 continues east, passing north of Youngstown, then crosses the Pennsylvania state line. Just 4 miles (6.4 km) into Pennsylvania, I-80 has a junction with Interstate 376, providing another connection to Pittsburgh.

Ohio State Route 11 (SR 11), a north–south freeway, runs to the west of Youngstown, joins a concurrency with I-80, traveling near the northwest of the city, then leaves the concurrency heading north; at some points SR 11 is no more than 2 1/2 miles (4.0 km) from the city limits. The route runs south to East Liverpool on the Ohio River; running north, it passes close to Niles and Warren before reaching I-90 in northeast Ohio, finally terminating in Ashtabula at Lake Erie.

=== Public transit ===
The Western Reserve Transit Authority (WRTA) operates a metropolitan public busing system in Mahoning and Trumbull counties. In Columbiana County, the Community Action Rural Transit System (CARTS) operates a rural public busing system.

== Colleges and universities ==
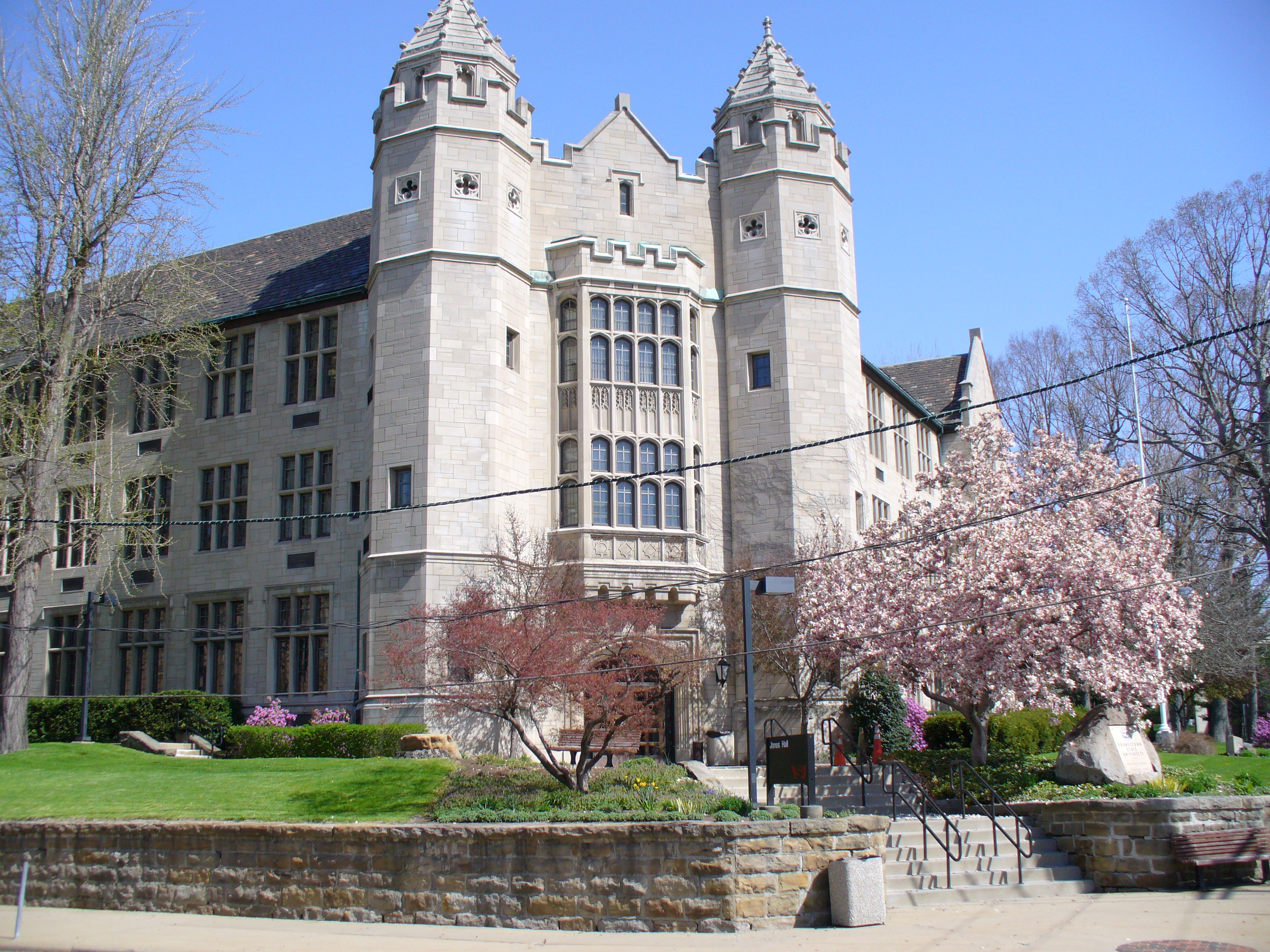
Jones Hall at Youngstown State University

The Mahoning Valley is home to a number of higher education facilities, including:

- Butler County Community College (Hermitage, Pennsylvania)
- Grove City College (Grove City, Pennsylvania)
- Kent State University at East Liverpool (East Liverpool)
- Kent State University at Salem (Salem)
- Kent State University at Trumbull (Warren)
- New Castle School of Trades (East Liverpool)
- Pennsylvania State University Shenango (Sharon, Pennsylvania)
- Thiel College (Greenville, Pennsylvania)
- Youngstown State University (Youngstown)

== Sports ==
Mahoning Valley area teams
Club	Sport	League (Conf)	Venue	Location
Mahoning Valley Scrappers	Baseball	Collegiate summer baseball	Eastwood Field	Niles
Youngstown Area Roller Derby	Roller derby	Women's Flat Track Derby Association	various	Youngstown
Youngstown Nighthawks	Indoor soccer	Major Arena Soccer League 3	Farmer Jim's Sports Complex	Cortland
Youngstown Phantoms	Ice hockey	United States Hockey League	Covelli Centre	Youngstown
Youngstown State University Penguins	various	NCAA (Horizon League, MVFC)	various, including Stambaugh Stadium	Youngstown

NCAA Division I sports are played in the region, with Youngstown State University fielding eight men's and ten women's teams.

== Media ==
=== Print ===
The area is served mainly by zoned editions of The Vindicator out of Youngstown and the Tribune Chronicle in Warren. They are published together in broadsheet at the Tribune Chronicle in Warren. The two newspapers, along with the, Lisbon-based Morning Journal, were independent until in June 2019 it was announced that The Vindicator would cease publication by mid-August of the same year. Although this newspaper carries the name of the old Vindicator, its scope is comparatively limited, with the majority of previous Vindicator journalists not being carried over to the new edition.

Other newspapers that print in Youngstown include bi-monthly The Business Journal, The Metro Monthly, and the bi-weekly The Jambar, published by the students of Youngstown State University on Tuesdays and Thursdays while classes are in session.

=== TV ===
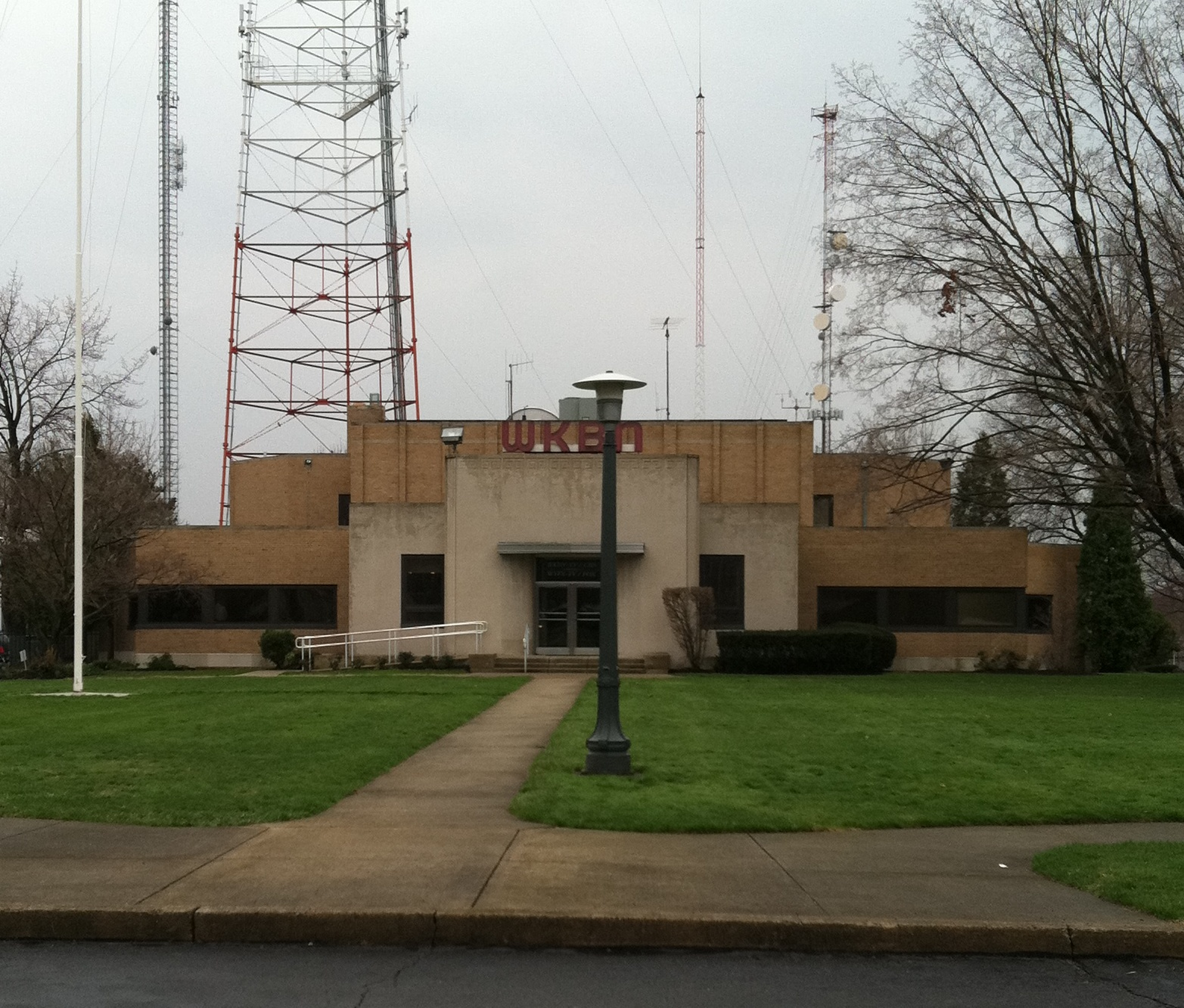
WKBN-TV studio

Mahoning Valley is part of the Youngstown media market, which includes Trumbull, Mahoning, and Columbiana counties in Ohio and Mercer County in Pennsylvania. As of 2024–25, with 263,000 television households, the Youngstown market is the nation's 118th largest, according to Nielsen Media Research.

The market is served is served by four full power television stations. including WFMJ-TV (channel 21, NBC, with The CW channel 21.2 under the WBCB call letters), WKBN-TV (channel 27, CBS), WYTV (channel 33, ABC, with MNTV on 33.2), and WNEO channel 45 (PBS).

Low power station WYFX-LD channel 62 serves as Youngstown's Fox affiliate, and is simulcast on WKBN 27.2.

=== Radio ===
The following stations are part of the Youngstown media market:

==== AM ====
- 570 WKBN Youngstown (News/talk)
- 600 WRQX Salem (Conservative talk)
- 790 WPIC Sharon, PA (Talk radio)
- 830 WKTX Cortland (Urban contemporary gospel)
- 940 WGRP Greenville, PA (Hot adult contemporary)
- 1200 WKST New Castle, PA (Classic hits)
- 1240 WBBW Youngstown (Sports - Infinity)
- 1280 WUZZ New Castle, PA (Classic country - WYLE simulcast)
- 1330 WGFT Campbell (Urban contemporary)
- 1390 WNIO Youngstown (Sports)
- 1440 WHKZ Warren (Catholic - Relevant Radio)
- 1470 WLOA Farrell, PA (Hip-hop)
- 1540 WYOH Niles (Talk)
- 1570 WYWO Warren (Talk)

==== FM ====
- 88.1 WSRU Slippery Rock, PA (College variety - Slippery Rock University)
- 88.5 WYSU Youngstown (NPR)
- 88.9 WWNW New Wilmington, PA (Adult contemporary - Westminster College)
- 89.5 WILB Boardman (Catholic)
- 90.1 WVMN New Castle, PA (Religious)
- 90.7 WKTL Struthers (Adult album alternative - WAPS semi-satellite)
- 91.7 WYTN Youngstown (Christian - Family Radio)
- 92.1 WCGF-FM Ellwood City, PA (Christian – Family Life Network)
- 93.3 WNCD Youngstown (Classic rock)
- 95.1 WYLE Grove City, PA (Classic country)
- 95.9 WAKZ Sharpsville, PA (Mainstream urban)
- 96.7 WLLF Mercer, PA (Sports)
- 98.9 WMXY Youngstown (Adult contemporary)
- 101.1 WHOT Youngstown (Contemporary hit radio)
- 101.9 WYLR Hubbard (Contemporary Christian - K-Love)
- 102.9 WYFM Sharon, PA (Classic rock)
- 103.9 WWIZ West Middlesex, PA (Oldies)
- 105.1 WQXK Salem (Country)
- 106.1 WBBG Niles (Country)
- 107.1 WLVX Greenville, PA (Christian adult contemporary - K-Love)

== See also ==
- Republic Steel
- Economy of Youngstown, Ohio
