= WYOH =

Radio station in Niles, Ohio

- Niles, Ohio; United States
- Broadcast area: Youngstown metropolitan area
- Frequency: 1540 kHz
- Branding: Real Talk 1540 WYOH

Programming
- Format: Progressive talk
- Affiliations: Compass Media Networks; USA News

Ownership
- Owner: Sagittarius Communications, LLC
- Sister stations: WYWO

History
- First air date: November 1, 1963
- Former call signs: WNIO (1963–1990); WNRB (1990–1994); WFNE (1994–1995); WNIO (1995–1999); WRTK (1999–2010); WYCL (2010–2018); DWYCL (2018); WYCL (2018–2022)
- Call sign meaning: Youngstown, Ohio

Technical information
- Licensing authority: FCC
- Facility ID: 73308
- Class: D
- Power: 500 watts day
- Transmitter coordinates: 41°7′56.00″N 80°45′40.00″W

Links
- Public license information: Public file; LMS
- Webcast: Listen live
- Website: talk977.com

WYOH (1540 AM) – branded as Real Talk 1540 WYOH – is a commercial daytime-only radio station licensed to serve Niles, Ohio. Owned by Sagittarius Communications, LLC., the station covers the Youngstown metropolitan area. WYOH broadcasts a progressive talk format. The WYOH studios and transmitter are both located in Mineral Ridge; in addition to a standard analog transmission, WYOH is also available online.

== History ==
The station went on the air as the original home of WNIO, which is where the call letters were derived from, the city of license of Niles, Ohio. The station was first owned by "The Niles Broadcasting Company", headed by Frank Bevilacqua, his son Robert Bevilacqua and Stephen Conti and operated out of studios at their transmitter site in Mineral Ridge, Ohio.

WNIO signed on as a Top 40 station, competing against the dominant Top 40 station in the market, WHOT (then at 1330 kHz; that frequency is now home to WGFT). During its Top 40 run, It featured personalities like Ron Leader, Steve Miller, Mike Richards, Vince Camp, Frankie "Mr. Lucky" Halfacre, and newsmen Ed Richards and Mark Dailey. By mid-1973, still under the Bevilacquas' ownership, the station had switched to a contemporary country format. "PS Broadcasting Corp", owned by James Psihoulis, acquired WNIO in late 1973. PS Broadcasting also owned WWIZ 103.9 MHz in nearby Mercer, which also featured the C&W format, and both stations often promoted each other.

WNIO would be the prominent country music voice in the Mahoning Valley region until the late 1980s, when FM stations like WQXK picked up the format. WNIO would be spun off to "WNIO Broadcasting Inc.", headed by Robert Doane and Dominic Baragona, in May 1980 (renamed "WN Broadcasting" in 1990), and launched an FM sister station, classic rock WNCD "CD106 The Wolf" (then located at the 106.1 MHz facility, also licensed to Niles) in 1988.

The station became WNRB on May 5, 1990, in a simulcast of Warren station WANR as "Network 15 - The Talk of the City". Both WANR and WNRB would carry a mixture of local talk programming and urban contemporary music. WANR would eventually be spun off to a separate ownership, thus ending the simulcast. On May 23, 1994, the station changed its call sign to WFNE, taking an all-comedy format (one of the few stations to do so in the entire country) as "Funny 1540". It also served as an affiliate for Dr. Demento's syndicated radio show. In the spring of 1995, the station reverted to its original WNIO callsign, and took an adult standards format featuring Vince Camp and onetime WHOT jocks Johnny Kay, Steve Miller and Dick Thompson.

WNIO and WNCD would eventually be purchased by Jacor Communications in July 1997, but a complex series of transactions over the course of two years soon began to take place. Bain Gocom, the Boston venture capital company that was a major investor in WKBN-TV's now-former parent company, purchased both WRTK 1390-AM and WBBG 93.3-FM in February 1998, then bought WTNX 95.9-FM and New Castle stations WICT 95.1-FM and WPAO 1470-AM by the end of that year. Gocom then leased out to Jacor operating control of their entire radio station group. Jacor would also buy WKBN 570-AM, WKBN 98.9-FM, and three additional stations in New Castle - WKST 1280-AM, WKST-FM 92.1-FM and WBZY 1200-AM, and took over operations of WBTJ 101.9-FM from owner Stop 26/Riverbend under an LMA. After Jacor completed its merger with Clear Channel Communications on April 29, 1999, ten radio stations in the Youngstown/New Castle region were now united under one roof.

Clear Channel decided to move WNIO's adult standards format to the Gocom-owned 1390 kHz facility, which would enable the station to operate around-the-clock as opposed to a daytime-only basis, a move that took place on November 11, 1999 (the adult standards format would last until December 27, 2010). While the 1540 kHz facility took the WRTK call letters, the "Real Talk" talk radio format previously heard on the 1390 kHz facility was discontinued. Instead, WRTK would operate first as a simulcast of WNCD, then of WBBG (which assumed the 106.1 MHz facility that was home to WNCD a year later), with the Mineral Ridge studios effectively abandoned.

WRTK and WPAO were purchased by Dale Edwards' D&E Broadcasting - owner of WABQ in Cleveland - in April 2001. Edwards relaunched the station with a R&B oldies format as "1540 The Hook", which was programmed by veteran Cleveland broadcaster Lynn Tolliver. While as "The Hook", the station also carried Doug Banks' syndicated morning show.

In March 2004, D&E Broadcasting filed an application with the FCC that would have allowed for WRTK to relocate to Lakewood, Ohio and operate as a daytimer on the 1180 kHz frequency, presumably from WABQ's transmitter facility, but said application was dismissed by August of that year. While WPAO was spun off to Holy Family Communications in 2003, Edwards kept WRTK until July 2005, when he sold it to Beacon Broadcasting, headed by former steel magnate Harold Glunt. This transaction also put WNIO back in common ownership with both WANR and WLOA (the former WPAO). In March 2006, nearly nine months after both Edwards and Tolliver left the station, the R&B format (which remained virtually intact, even with liners and IDs voiced by Tolliver) was finally replaced with urban gospel, carrying the Rejoice! Musical Soul Food satellite network.

In January 2009, WRTK became "Freq 1540", playing contemporary Christian, southern gospel, and many other like genres. The "Freq" nickname was borrowed from then-sister station WEXC, and its slogan, "Reaching The Kingdom", became a backronym for the station's callsign. After Harold Glunt died in January 2010, all of his stations were put up for sale, including WRTK. Consequently, WRTK dropped the CCM format in favor of a daytime-only simulcast of Fox Sports affiliate WANR.

On Friday, August 13, 2010, WRTK and WANR were sold to Whiplash Radio LLC of Ohio. The company is headed by radio veteran Chris Lash, who has owned, built and operated stations in Pennsylvania, Florida, Tennessee and Ohio. WRTK's abandoned studio/transmitter facility was since heavily remodeled and cleaned up, and now houses both stations. WRTK officially split from its simulcast of WANR on September 1, 2010, in favor of a classic country format, dubbed "1540 The Farm". The new classic country format was also a throwback to WNIO's stint as a country outlet throughout the 1970s and 1980s.

Weekday programming included a morning show hosted by Burton Lee starting at the station's sign-on at dawn, and a one-hour version of "Country Gold With Rowdy Yates" at noon. Syndicated weekend programs included America's Grand Ole Opry Weekend, Country Music Greats with Jim Ed Brown, Wheeling Jamboree, The Ron Seggi Show on Saturdays, and Country Gold with Rowdy Yates on Sundays. On Thursday, December 9, WRTK applied to the Federal Communications Commission for new call letters WYCL, standing for "Youngstown's Country Legends".

On June 6, citing health concerns, owner Chris Lash leased out operating control of WYCL to Skylar Cato Broadcasting, managed by Philip Cato, who changed WYCL's format to locally produced talk radio. Louie b. Free moved his talk show from WGFT over to WYCL, where he had a succession of different airtimes during Skylar Cato management, and continued to broadcast on WYCL until late 2012.

The lease was canceled that November 25 and subsequently turned over to WHTX operator JL Communications, LLC (managed by Jim Davison and Laurel Taylor) who temporarily flipped the station to a partial simulcast of WHTX before relaunching the talk format as "Valley Talk 1540 WYCL" in January 2012. Some of the talk hosts on WYCL included a simulcast of WHTX morning host Gary Rhamy, Louie B. Free in the late morning/early afternoons, Frank Bellamy in the late afternoons, Don Hanni III on Saturday afternoons (and early evenings in spring and summer months) and syndicated programs hosted by Jim Blasingame and Maureen Anderson.

The talk format would end that April, reverting to a total simulcast of WHTX again as "The Fabulous 1570/1540" (with Louie's show airing on both stations) before finally returning to classic country, once again as "1540 The Farm", on June 18, 2012.

Sagittarius Communications, LLC, took over WYCL and WHTX on October 1, 2012, via a local marketing agreement with a lease-to-purchase option from Whiplash Radio, LLC. That November 1, WYCL flipped from classic country over to a tropical Spanish format branded as "La Nueva Mia 1540".

Sagittarius' lease-to-purchase option with WYCL and WHTX initially failed to close, and another local marketing agreement was established in May 2013 by WHTX and WYCL's engineer, Ben Slagle (who subsequently assumed like duties for Radio One's Cleveland, Ohio, cluster of radio stations) in May 2013. The format, in turn, flipped back to classic country, once again as "1540 The Farm". Programming this time included a simulcast of Gary Rhamy's WHTX adult-standards-driven morning drive program, and an afternoon program hosted by Chet Holbrook.

Whiplash Radio of Ohio, LLC, took WYCL dark on October 1, 2013, after the voluntary cancellation of Slagle's local marketing agreement due to non-payment, in addition to a number of unresolved technical issues at the stations' transmitter site. Following a court settlement in late October 2013 between Sagittarius and Whiplash Radio, WHTX and WYCL were returned to Sagittarius. While WYCL remained silent, it resumed operations on December 15, 2013, once again carrying a tropical Spanish format as "La Nueva Mia 1540".

In March 2017, WYCL updated its branding and on-air presentation to "Youngstown's Cool WYCL 1540 AM" carrying a greatest hits of the 1980s format in addition to dropping the tropical Spanish format.

On November 20, 2017, WYCL changed formats again to conservative talk featuring news at the top of the hour from the Salem Radio Network. The station primarily aired Salem's syndicated talk shows, including Hugh Hewitt, Dennis Prager, Larry Elder, and Mike Gallagher.

Station owner Whiplash Radio surrendered the licenses to both WHTX and WYCL on February 14, 2018, and sent the FCC a request to delete both licenses, effective immediately. While initially granting this request (the call letters would be formally reassigned as DWYCL), both licenses and callsigns were restored by the FCC on May 4, 2018, and the assignment application for consent to assign the licenses to Sagittarius Communications was concurrently reinstated. After the order from the FCC, the licence for the station was given to Michael Thompson, Receiver until the sale to Sagittarius Communication is complete.

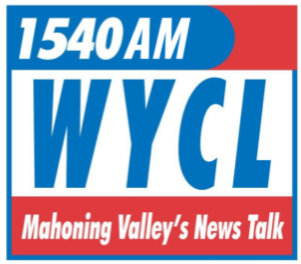
WYCL's logo under previous talk format

On January 28, 2019, WYCL relaunched as "NewsTalk 1540 WYCL", carrying programming from Salem Radio Network, Fox Sports Radio, Westwood One, Fox News Radio, and SB Nation Radio. While WYCL is a daytime-only station, programming does continue to air 24/7 through their internet audio stream on TalkMahoningValley.com.

On April 9, 2018, the station sale was consummated and ownership was transferred to Sagittarius Communications, LLC.

Sometime in August 2019, WYCL due to technical issues, filed with the FCC a silent STA, until repairs could be made. The FCC granted the STA. A short time later, WYCL resumed operations with a news talk format.

On April 30, 2021, WYCL dropped the news talk format for locally programmed oldies. The station was branded "Cool 1540".

On Monday July 18, 2022, WYCL returned to a news talk format featuring shows from Fox News Radio, Salem Radio Network and others. Weekend programming features all Spanish Music. The station changed its call sign to WYOH on September 5, 2022.

== Notable alumni ==
- Mark Dailey (1953–2010) - longtime anchorman and continuity announcer for CITY-TV in Toronto, who started in broadcasting as a newscaster for WNIO in 1969.
