= Steel Valley =

Steel Valley can refer to:

- Northern Steel Valley (Ohio-Pennsylvania), the area around Youngstown, Ohio stretching from metro Pittsburgh to metro Cleveland
- Southern Steel Valley (Pittsburgh), area around Pittsburgh, Pennsylvania, with it primarily describing the Monongahela Valley and Upper Ohio Valley steeltowns
  - Steel Valley School District
- Vale do Aço, the 'Steel Valley' metropolitan area in Minas Gerais, Brazil
- The valley around Stocksbridge, South Yorkshire, due to its long history of steel production
