= WKTX =

Radio station in Cortland, Ohio

- Cortland, Ohio; United States
- Broadcast area: Youngstown metropolitan area
- Frequency: 830 kHz
- Branding: 99.7 The Drum

Programming
- Format: Urban gospel; Black talk; classic R&B

Ownership
- Owner: Dale Edwards; (Kingstrust LLC)

History
- First air date: April 1, 1985
- Former call signs: WLND (1985-1989)

Technical information
- Licensing authority: FCC
- Class: D
- Power: 1,000 watts days only
- Transmitter coordinates: 41°24′56″N 80°43′49″W
- Translator: 99.7 FM W259DI (Youngstown)

Links
- Public license information: Public file; LMS
- Webcast: Listen live
- Website: thedrumradio.com

WKTX (830 kHz) is a commercial AM radio station in Cortland, Ohio, serving the Youngstown metropolitan area. It broadcasts an urban gospel radio format in the daytime, along with some Black talk and Christian talk and teaching programs. At night it switches to classic R&B music. The on-air identity is known as "The Drum 99.7 FM".

WKTX is powered by day at 1,000 watts, as a Class D daytimer station. Because AM 830 is a clear channel frequency, reserved for Class A station WCCO in Minneapolis, WKTX must sign off at night. The transmitter is off Mahan Denman Road at Phillips Rice Road in Mecca Township, Ohio. WKTX programming is also heard around the clock on 200 watt FM translator W259DI 99.7 MHz in Youngstown.

== History ==
=== WLND ===
The construction permit for the station that would later be known as WKTX was first issued in October 1982. It signed on the air on April 1, 1985, under the ownership of Cortland Broadcasting Company, headed by the Skip and Nancy Hoffman and Glen Barker families. The original call sign was WLND.

For many years, the station had studios and offices in Cortland, Ohio, with the original location along Ohio State Route 5 (Elm Street Extension). The format at the time of sign-on was country music, oldies, and farm information.

=== Christian music ===
In February 1989, the station was sold to the Trumbull County Broadcasting Company, owned by Patrick Engrao. It flipped to a Christian music format and switched its call letters to WKTX. In this station's formative years, it was the AM sister station of WKTX-FM 96.7, licensed to Mercer, Pennsylvania.

In October 1991, WKTX was purchased by Nationality Broadcasting Network, headed by Miklos Kossanyi and the format became adult standards. In 1997 it went off the air for a month to move the tower and transmitter to a new location and then returned with the same format. It later became an ethnic radio station, airing programs in foreign languages.

=== Change in ownership ===
Miklos Kossanyi continued ownership of the station, with Kossanyi, his wife and his son listed as the licensee, instead of Nationality Broadcasting Network. Miklós Kossányi, born in Komárom, Hungary, died in October 2009. His wife, Mária Kossányi replaced him as the director of the station. When her husband and ethnic broadcasting partner died, Maria Kossanyi took ill and never recovered. Mrs. Kossanyi died August 15, 2010, at her Bay Village home, at the age of 84.

Upon settlement of the Kossanyis' estates, ownership of WKTX's broadcast license was assigned to their son Attila Kossanyi on June 23, 2016. Attila subsequently sold the station to Kingstrust LLC, effective July 21, 2016, at a price of $85,000.

=== Urban gospel and R&B ===
On January 1, 2020, the station began programming an urban gospel format. Programming originally was provided by Rejoice, Musical Soul Food.

On Friday, September 11, 2020, WKTX launched its FM translator, calling the station "99.7 The Drum". The format was modified from all gospel music to a locally programmed gospel music and Christian talk and teaching programming airing on Sundays and during the weekday daytime hours. R&B, soul music, southern blues, and public affairs talk programming air on Saturdays and during the evening and overnight hours on weeknights.

The station is programmed by Columbus, Ohio, attorney and former Youngstown native Percy Squire, who at one time owned Youngstown area radio stations WRBP, WGFT, and WASN. Squire previously programmed a similar format on WVKO in Columbus.

The station fell silent on April 18, 2025, after lightning damaged WKTX's transmitter.
