= WRBP =

WRBP may refer to:

- WRBP-LP, a low-power radio station (92.5 FM) licensed to serve Wisconsin Rapids, Wisconsin, United States
- WYLR, a radio station (101.9 FM) licensed to serve Hubbard, Ohio, United States, which held the call sign WRBP from 1992 to 1998 and from 2001 to 2013
