= WYWO =

Radio station in Warren, Ohio

- Warren, Ohio; United States
- Broadcast area: Mahoning Valley
- Frequency: 1570 kHz
- Branding: The Talk Of The Town 97.7 and WYWO 1570 AM

Programming
- Language: English
- Format: News/talk
- Affiliations: Fox News Radio; Compass Media Networks; Salem Radio Network

Ownership
- Owner: Sagittarius Communications, LLC
- Sister stations: WYOH

History
- First air date: April 7, 1971
- Former call signs: WTCL (1971–1981); WOKG (1981–1990); WANR (1990–2011); WHTX (2011–2026)

Technical information
- Licensing authority: FCC
- Facility ID: 70531
- Class: B
- Power: 750 watts day; 170 watts night
- Transmitter coordinates: 41°12′22.2″N 80°50′28.3″W
- Translator: 97.7 W249EE (Warren)

Links
- Public license information: Public file; LMS
- Webcast: Listen live
- Website: talk977.com

WYWO (1570 kHz) – branded as WYWO 1570 AM – is a commercial news talk AM radio station licensed to serve Warren, Ohio. Owned by Sagittarius Communications, LLC., the station covers the Youngstown metropolitan area and much of the Mahoning Valley. The WYWO studios are located in Mineral Ridge, while the station transmitter resides in Warren. Besides a standard analog transmission, WYWO is available online.

== History ==
=== Past frequency usage ===
The 1570 frequency was the original home of WHOT, then a daytime-only station that signed on October 16, 1955, licensed to the town of Campbell, Ohio. One of the first Top 40 stations in the United States, WHOT was founded by Myron Jones and Bill Fleckinstein, who first signed on WJET in Erie, Pennsylvania on 1570 kHz as a daytimer. After upgrading WJET to a full-time signal on 1400 kHz in 1955, Jones and Fleckinstein used the now-opened 1570 kHz to establish WHOT in the Youngstown suburb of Campbell, Ohio, as a 250–watt non-directional daytime-only station. At the time, the station had to sign off at nighttime in order to protect clear channel XERF in Ciudad Acuña, and for a period WHOT was the only daytimer in the Youngstown market.

Despite the technical limitations, WHOT rose to the top of the local ratings in the Youngstown area. Longtime broadcaster Dick Biondi was the afternoon host on WHOT for much of this time. In 1963, WHOT moved to the 1330 frequency as a full-time operation.

=== Early years ===
The next station to use 1570 kHz in the Youngstown metropolitan area was WTCL, which signed on from Warren, Ohio, in 1971. WTCL became WOKG on November 2, 1981, and would eventually come under the ownership of Geraldine Taczak. In WOKG's later years, it aired a controversial locally-based talk radio format under the "Talk 1570" name. Programmed by Steve Fine, the lineup featured Neil Hagan (host of "Sundown Talk"), A.J., Larry Hall, Charles Cunningham, Mike Murphy and Mike Ward. Even while the station had authorization for nighttime operation by this period, WOKG primarily operated during the daytime hours (excluding whenever high school play-by-play would air). As a result, the schedule would vary according to sunrise and sunset times.

On March 23, 1990, the WOKG studios in Warren Township, Ohio, were destroyed by a fire, which was ruled arson by local authorities. No suspects were ever apprehended, and the case remains unsolved to this day. The station returned to the air on March 30, 1990, from studios in a pizza concession trailer, located in the parking lot next to the destroyed converted farm house which had previously housed the station. Shortly thereafter, Geraldine Taczak would make plans to sell the station.

In the following months, the station began simulcasting an urban-contemporary format with the 1540 facility in Niles, Ohio, known as "Network 15 - The City." WOKG took the WANR calls on December 15, 1990, while the 1540 facility assumed the complementary WNRB callsign. The two stations on "Network 15" featured local personalities such as program director/morning host Boots Bell, Sweat William, DC Don Clyde, Will Thomas, and Steve Arnold. The station was most known for the paid General Motors program "GM Together" - which focused on the company's nearby plant in Lordstown, Ohio - and "TMH together," focusing on Trumbull Memorial Hospital.

WANR split off from WNRB in 1994, and carried a basic news/talk and sports format. Beacon Broadcasting, headed by Michael Arch, acquired WANR in late 1998, and the station added Christian programming to the mix as "The Arrow." It then carried a mix of oldies music and specialty talk shows as "Crusin' 1570," and then went back to a talk format as "The Talk of the Valley." WANR's studios by this point were located at 124 North Park Avenue in Warren's historic downtown Courthouse Square.

=== Recent years ===
After airing a number of syndicated and local talk programs, in 2005 WANR became the Youngstown/Warren area affiliate of the Air America Radio liberal talk radio network. It also broadcast a local talk radio program called The New Talk of the Town, hosted by local political figure Don Hanni III. The liberal talk format was operated by Hanni and associates under a local marketing agreement.

After a dispute between the station's ownership and the group operating the station, a court settlement returned programming control to owner Beacon Broadcasting. Following the court decision, former Warren steel supply magnate Harold Glunt took exclusive control over Beacon, and soon acquired WGRP and WEXC from Vilkie Communications, WLOA from Holy Family Communications, and former sister station WRTK from D&E Broadcasting. Glunt readjusted Beacon's focus to being a faith-based company that adhered to "family friendly" radio.

Following the change in control of Beacon, WANR switched formats to a mixture of Christian and secular oldies music, which featured hosts Michelle Stevenson's local, Gospel artist showcase, and Neil Hagan's urban Gospel format, "the Brother Neil Gospel Show," until adopting a "Family Friendly" oldies trimulcast with WLOA and WGRP. Initially identifying itself with the anachronistic "Wexy 107" name, a branding previously used by WEXC, this arrangement later was known as "1570, 1470 and 940 - Your Family Friendly Frequencies." It ended in December 2006, with the two other stations adopting separate formats, while WANR became "Classic Hits 1570" With local air talents Gregg "Allen" Robison, Johnny "Rogers" Kuty, and John "The Madman" Madden. The station was managed by Richard Esbenshade. The classic hits format was dropped in favor of sports radio on July 4, 2009, WANR carried most of the Fox Sports Radio schedule, but aired a three-hour program devoted to professional boxing in place of The Dan Patrick Show, which WBBW carried.

Following the death of Harold Glunt in January 2010, all of the Beacon stations, including WANR and WRTK, were put up for sale. Concurrently, WRTK also began a full-time simulcast of WANR's sports format. Whiplash Radio, LLC, headed by broadcaster Chris Lash, purchased the stations on August 13, 2010. Both WRTK and WANR then moved to WRTK's studio/transmitter site in Mineral Ridge a few weeks later, with WRTK assuming a separate classic country format on September 1, 2010.

The sports radio format and Fox Sports Radio affiliation was dropped in November 2010 after Clear Channel Communications announced a new affiliation agreement between the network and WNIO. In exchange, WANR revived its previous classic hits format christened as "The Blizzard". WANR's call sign was changed to WHTX on January 20, 2011. WHTX then switched formats again to adult standards on March 22, 2011, with programming sourced from Dial Global Local's The Lounge format, with longtime Youngstown radio personality Gary Rhamy in morning drive. Operating control of WHTX was leased out to Jim Davison that June 6, who then teamed up with Laurel Taylor to form JL Communications LLC in November 2011, in addition to assuming operating control of WYCL. The station in this period featured local high school sports coverage with Warren JFK and Warren G. Harding High School, and was the flagship station of the Mahoning Valley Scrappers of the New York-Penn League from 2011 to 2012, the Pittsburgh Pirates from 2011 through 2012 (and a portion of the 2013 season) and Notre Dame Fighting Irish football for a portion of the 2013 season.

Sagittarius Communications, LLC, took over WHTX and WYCL on October 1, 2012, via a local marketing agreement with a lease-to-purchase option from Whiplash Radio, LLC. After initially dropping Dial Global's "The Lounge" service and all weekend programming, WHTX continued programming adult standards until dropping it for a satellite-programmed rhythmic oldies format on January 1, 2013. Sagittarius' lease-to-purchase option with WHTX and WYCL failed to close, and another local marketing agreement was established in May 2013 by "Group Radio, LLC", headed by former Akron radio personality Tim Phillips, who re-implemented an adult standards format on WHTX. Following a court settlement in late October 2013 between Sagittarius and Whiplash Radio, WHTX and WYCL were returned to Sagittarius. Concurrently, WHTX flipped back to a rhythmic oldies format on November 2, 2013, then switched to talk radio by March 2017.

On February 14, 2018, Whiplash Radio, LLC attempted to turn in both the station‘s license and the license for WYCL, and sent the FCC a request to delete both licenses, effective immediately. While initially granting this request, the FCC reversed course that May 4, restoring both the licenses and call letters of WHTX and WYCL and reinstated the assignment application for consent to assign the licenses to Sagittarius Communications. After the order from the FCC, the license for the station was transferred to a court-appointed receivership until the sale was completed.

WHTX was relaunched on September 1, 2018, as an ESPN Radio affiliate. Branded as "ESPN 1570 Mahoning Valley", WHTX carried talk and play-by-play programming from ESPN Radio, the OHSAA Radio Network, and the Pittsburgh Penguins Radio Network. The station would drop the format on January 1, 2020, and also increased both daytime and nighttime power later in the month to 750 watts and 170 watts, respectively.

In February 2022, WHTX dropped the classic hits format and moved to a news/talk format during the week. Programming from the Salem Radio Network, Fox News Radio and more are aired during the week. On the weekends, the station airs Spanish-language music on Saturdays and gospel music on Sundays.

The call sign was changed to WYWO on March 2, 2026.
