= Youngstown Radio Reading Service =

The Youngstown Radio Reading Service (YRRS) is a radio reading service located in Youngstown, Ohio, providing daily readings of a wide variety of topical printed materials to blind and vision-impaired people. YRRS is based at 2747 Belmont Avenue at the Goodwill Industries building in Youngstown. It is a member of Ohio Radio Reading Services, an organization of nine radio reading services throughout Ohio. A volunteer-driven operation, YRRS operates everyday from noon to 11:40 p.m.

Reception of YRRS requires a special radio receiver tuned to WYSU 88.5 FM; the receiver is provided at no cost to its vision-impaired listeners. YRRS operates with the use of WYSU's radio subcarrier.

== Funding ==
Monetary support for the YRRS and other radio reading services comes from the United Way, state and municipal funding, endowments, grants, corporate gifts, community service organizations, fund-raising events and listener contributions.
