= WLOA =

Radio station in Farrell, Pennsylvania

- Farrell, Pennsylvania; United States
- Broadcast area: Sharon, Pennsylvania; Hermitage, Pennsylvania; Youngstown, Ohio
- Frequency: 1470 kHz
- Branding: LOUD 102.3

Programming
- Format: Rhythmic contemporary
- Affiliations: Compass Media Networks

Ownership
- Owner: Over/Under LLC; (O/U Radio, Inc.)

History
- First air date: October 3, 1954
- Former call signs: WFAR (1954–1980); WGBU (1980–1982); WMGZ (1982–1989); WOJY (1989–1991); WRQQ (1991–1996); WICT (1996–1997); WPAO (1997–2003)
- Call sign meaning: Our Lady of the Angels, artifact of former Catholic radio format

Technical information
- Licensing authority: FCC
- Facility ID: 47569
- Class: B
- Power: 1,000 watts (day); 500 watts (night)
- Transmitter coordinates: 41°11′58″N 80°31′22″W
- Translator: 102.3 W272EI (Youngstown)

Links
- Public license information: Public file; LMS
- Webcast: Listen live
- Website: loud1023.com

WLOA (1470 AM) is a commercial rhythmic contemporary radio station licensed to Farrell, Pennsylvania. Owned by Over/Under, LLC, the station serves both the Sharon, Pennsylvania, and Youngstown, Ohio, markets. WLOA also simulcasts over Youngstown translator W272EI (102.3 FM). The WLOA studios are located in the city of Meadville, while the transmitter for WLOA resides off of South State Line Road in Masury, Ohio; W272EI's transmitter is located off of Mabel Street in Youngstown's Lansingville neighborhood. In addition to a standard analog transmission, WLOA is available online.

== History ==
=== Early years ===
The station first signed on the air as WFAR, a 500-watt daytime-only station, on October 3, 1954. The station was founded by Sanford A. Schafitz, a native of the Youngstown area, doing business as Farrell-Sharon Broadcasting Company. Before WFAR went on the air, a dispute occurred between Greater New Castle Broadcasting Corporation and Schafitz. Greater New Castle Broadcasting Corporation wanted to put a 1,000 watt daytime-only station on 1460 kHz in New Castle, Pennsylvania, and Schafitz wanted to put a 500 watt daytime only station on 1470 kHz. The Federal Communications Commission (FCC) ruled in favor of Schafitz on September 4, 1953, and he put the station on the air shortly thereafter.

WFAR applied for a power increase to 1,000 watts daytime on February 1, 1955, granted by the FCC on September 22, 1955. An application to operate 24 hours a day, transmitting 1,000 watts daytime and 500 watts at night using a three-tower directional antenna system, was filed on April 10, 1957; WFAR also sought to change transmission locations to South State Line Road in Masury, Ohio, its current location. The FCC granted the request on September 24, 1958, and these operating parameters were implemented by 1961. Around this time, Schafitz also started up WWIZ in Lorain, Ohio, in 1958 and was involved in the launching of WXTV in Youngstown, despite the latter having authority to sign on as early as 1955, WXTV did not formally launch until 1960.

WFAR's license was almost denied renewal in the wake of findings that Schafitz transferred station control of WWIZ to The Journal of Lorain without authorization from the FCC weeks before the station signed on, which was further complicated by Harry Horvitz (the chief owner of Journal Publishing) and his attempt to buy the station outright in 1961. The Journal was a party that actually tried to get the station assigned in the first place via a complicated straw-man transaction designed to circumvent the legal requirements which prevented the newspaper from holding a license. (Prior to the 1948 establishment of the radio station WEOL in Elyria, Ohio, The Journal had a near monopoly on news gathering in the city of Lorain.) The Journal paid a total of $56,000 for all the authorized nonvoting and voting preferred stock in WWIZ, a transaction later cited by the FCC as a means to finance WXTV's construction.

The licenses for WFAR, WXTV and WWIZ were designated for hearing by the FCC in March 1962 as part of a review of all of Schafitz's holdings; days after the designation was announced, WXTV failed to sign on due to "technical difficulties" and never resumed broadcasting. WXTV was denied a license renewal, and a license to cover a construction permit to move to channel 45 because Schafitz failed to disclose that Guy W. Gully, who was 50% owner of WXTV, was indicted for a felony.

On March 25, 1964, the FCC issued the decision to deny the license renewals of WWIZ and WXTV and ordered them off the air by June 1. However, the FCC allowed the license for WFAR to be renewed. WXTV's channel allocation was reassigned to Alliance as an educational frequency and was eventually occupied by WNEO. The license for WWIZ was appealed before the Supreme Court, and ultimately was revoked in late 1966. WWIZ then operated under a temporary permit until being ordered off the air entirely on July 14, 1967, with a replacement station being launched on December 4, 1969, as WLRO.

On December 28, 1976, WFAR was joined by WFAR-FM 95.9. Both stations shared the same call letters even though the FM station had a different city of license–nearby Sharpsville–and its own independent programming.

Schafitz died in May 1979. WFAR and its sister station, WFAR-FM, were sold on October 24, 1980 to Broadcast Service Communications, Inc., a company headed by Robert E. Kassi, for $603,750. WFAR was immediately rechristened with the new call letters WGBU, with the Top-40 and oldies format being dropped in favor of beautiful music, news and talk, eventually adopting a full-time news and talk format by 1982. WFAR-FM was rechristened as WGBZ, adopting a rock format and aspiring to serve Youngstown.

The changes did little to make the stations prosper, and they were sold to National Communications System, Inc., a company headed by Jerome Bresson, on June 4, 1982, for $700,000; WGBU became WMGZ and WGBZ became WMGZ-FM, and both stations started simulcasting an adult contemporary format full-time.

From then on, the station underwent a number of callsign changes — to WOJY in 1989; to WRQQ on March 18, 1991. The station became WICT on March 29, 1996, sharing a callsign with another new sister station, WICT-FM "95.1 The Cat" in Grove City, and changed again to WPAO on March 3, 1997.

By 1997, WPAO and WICT were absorbed, along with New Castle stations WKST, WKST-FM and WBZY, into the growing Jacor Communications cluster, which merged into Clear Channel Communications in May 1999. Along with Youngstown stations WRTK, WBBG, WNIO, WNCD, WTNX (the former WMGZ-FM), WKBN, WKBN-FM, and WBTJ (operated with a local marketing agreement from owner Stop 26/Riverbend), ten radio stations in both markets were now controlled by the same owner.

WNIO and WRTK swapped callsigns in October 1999, and Clear Channel sold both WRTK and WPAO to D&E Communications in April 2001, headed by Dale Edwards, who eventually would also purchase WABQ (1540 AM) in Cleveland; records show that WPAO had a Christian radio format at this time. In November 2002, D&E Broadcasting sold the station to Holy Family Communications, headed by James N. Wright, for $350,000. Holy Family Communications took over operations on February 10, 2003, and changed the call sign to WLOA that February 18, to complement the other radio stations in the group.

=== Recent years ===
Beacon Broadcasting, headed by Warren steel supply magnate Harold Glunt, purchased WLOA on July 7, 2005 for $295,000. The Catholic programming was dropped and replaced with a classic hits format previously heard on WEXC in Greenville prior to its acquisition by Beacon, it eventually was simulcast on both WGRP, also in Greenville, and WANR in Warren. This lasted until December 2006, when a sports format featuring Sporting News Radio was installed on WLOA and WGRP. In April 2008, WGRP briefly broke away from simulcasting WLOA, and began to broadcast classic country, with WLOA rejoining WGRP a few months later in September 2008.

Harold Glunt died in January 2010; his son took over ownership of the stations, and put all of them up for sale. Educational Media Foundation acquired WLOA, WGRP and WEXC for a combined $225,000 on September 10, 2010; all three stations changed formats to relay the national non-commercial K-Love feed. WLOA was then taken off-the-air on January 15, 2011, with a special temporary authority (STA) to remain silent being filed that February 3, being granted this authority on March 14, 2011. EMF would then sell off WLOA and WGRP on July 25, 2011 to Vilkie Communications, headed by WMVL owner Joe Vilkie, for $50,000. Vilkie Communications assumed control of both stations on December 15, 2011.

On June 1, 2016, Williamsport Broadcasting Inc. entered into a local mareting agreement with Vilkie Communications Inc. with the intention to purchase WLOA.

In March 2019, WLOA was sold to a new broadcaster, Over/Under LLC, who then moved the station closer into the Youngstown market.

=== FM translator ===
On April 15, 2019 at 5:00 p.m., WLOA signed on an FM translator, W272EI, broadcasting at 102.3 MHz and licensed to Youngstown. WLOA concurrently switched formats to rhythmic contemporary, branded as "LOUD 102.3". The flip brought the rhythmic format back to the region after nearly 20 years and filled an urban contemporary void in the Youngstown market after WRBP's flip to K-Love in 2013.

Broadcast translator for WLOA
Call sign	Frequency	City of license	FID	ERP (W)	HAAT	Class	Transmitter coordinates	FCC info
W272EI	102.3 FM	Youngstown, Ohio	202961	99	217 m (712 ft)	D	41°4′48.6″N 80°38′24.4″W	LMS

=== Transmitter site ===
WLOA transmitter site at 1620 South Stateline Road in Masury, Ohio
WLOA transmitter site	Central main tower	Central and west towers	East tower
WLOA transmitter site at 1620 South Stateline Road in Masury, Ohio	WLOA central main tower	WLOA central and west towers	WLOA east tower.
