= WMVL =

- Linesville, Pennsylvania; United States
- Broadcast area: Meadville, Pennsylvania
- Frequency: 101.7 MHz
- Branding: Cool 101.7

Programming
- Format: Classic hits
- Affiliations: ABC News Radio, United Stations Radio Networks

Ownership
- Owner: Vilkie Communications
- Sister stations: WGRP

History
- First air date: May 4, 1970
- Former call signs: WVCC (1970–2003)
- Call sign meaning: "Meadville"

Technical information
- Licensing authority: FCC
- Facility ID: 2900
- Class: A
- ERP: 1,400 watts
- HAAT: 169 meters (554 ft)
- Transmitter coordinates: 41°42′38.00″N 80°16′29.00″W

Links
- Public license information: Public file; LMS
- Webcast: Listen live
- Website: cool1017online.com

WMVL (101.7 FM) is a radio station broadcasting a classic hits format. Licensed to Linesville, Pennsylvania, United States, the station serves the Meadville, Pennsylvania area. The station is currently owned by Vilkie Communications and features programing from ABC News Radio and United Stations Radio Networks.

Before being purchased by Vilkie Communications, WMVL was based in Linesville, and was known as WVCC ("The Wonderful Voice of Crawford County").

== History ==
The station first signed on the air May 4, 1970, as WVCC, with the call letters standing for "The Wonderful Voice of Crawford County". Arthur W. Cervi served as the station's president and general manager, as well as the licensee. The station played a format of easy listening music, with specialty programming of country and classical music on the weekends. Cervi, a resident of Pittsburgh's East Hills, moved his family to northwestern Pennsylvania shortly after being granted the license.

For the duration that he owned the station, Cervi ran the radio station from studios he constructed in the basement of his home on Maple Road in Linesville, and did much of the programming, engineering, and sales work himself. This frugal business model allowed WVCC to serve primarily Linesville and the western portion of Crawford County, though it was a fairly rural community that did not have a great retail base for commercial advertising business. Nonetheless, WVCC became a very powerful local voice for the Linesville area, through its involvement in the community.

By 1980, the station had moved from an easy listening to a more adult contemporary sound, with Cervi's son, Arthur W. Cervi Jr. assuming management and programming duties. Towards the end of the '80s, WVCC switched from music reels played by an automation system to a satellite-delivered format of Adult Standards from the Satellite Music Network.

The station's present owner, Joseph Vilkie, joined the radio station in the late 1990s. After the turn of the 21st Century, Cervi wanted to retire and offered Vilkie the opportunity to purchase the station. Vilkie and his father, Eugene Vilkie, formed Vilkie Communications and purchased the station on April 1, 2003. Not long after taking over the station, Vilkie Communications moved the station from Cervi's basement to its present location at the Vernon Village shopping center in Meadville, switched the call letters to WMVL and changed the station's format from adult standards to oldies. The station also embraced the resort community of Conneaut Lake in its marketing efforts in addition to Linesville and western Crawford County.

== Radio Hosts ==
Cool 101.7 advertises itself as "local radio, local people," and as such the station features on-air personalities predominantly from the Meadville and Crawford County area. The station's morning show is the only one the Crawford county listening area that begins at 5am and was hosted on weekdays for many years by Dave Hanahan, until shortly before his death on Saturday, January 23, 2016, after a two-year battle with cancer.

"Susie Q" hosts late mornings into the early afternoon. Dr. Tom Arno hosts the late afternoon block from his home studio in Charleston South Carolina. Tom Arno remains one Meadville's most popular radio personalities despite broadcasting from another state. He also acts as the in-house meteorologist for Cool 101.7. The weekday late night block is hosted by Jenna Wagner, weekend afternoons are hosted by Tonya Vorisek and Sunday afternoons are hosted by Chuck Burkett.

== Sports Coverage ==
WMVL is the sole broadcaster of many high school sports teams in the Crawford County area. Local football, baseball, basketball and wrestling are covered extensively throughout the year. In 2011 WMVL also joined in a partnership to broadcast college sports for Allegheny College, including football and basketball. Operations manager and sports director Chuck Stopp has been heard on the station since 1970, and continued with the station since it changed from WVCC to WMVL. He provides play-by-play commentary for a majority of the high school and college sports that are broadcast on the station.
