= WHOT-FM =

Radio station in Youngstown, Ohio

- Youngstown, Ohio; United States
- Broadcast area: Youngstown metropolitan area; Northeast Ohio; Western Pennsylvania
- Frequency: 101.1 MHz
- Branding: HOT 101

Programming
- Language: English
- Format: Contemporary hit radio
- Affiliations: Westwood One

Ownership
- Owner: Cumulus Media; (Cumulus Licensing LLC)
- Sister stations: WBBW; WPIC; WQXK; WRQX; WWIZ; WYFM

History
- First air date: November 1959
- Former call signs: WRED (1959-1972); WSRD (1978-1984)
- Call sign meaning: Hot Hits

Technical information
- Licensing authority: FCC
- Facility ID: 13670
- Class: B
- ERP: 24,500 watts
- HAAT: 215 meters (705 ft)
- Transmitter coordinates: 41.057°N 80.639°W

Links
- Public license information: Public file; LMS
- Webcast: Listen live
- Website: www.hot101.com

WHOT-FM (101.1 MHz, "Hot 101") is a commercial radio station in Youngstown, Ohio that plays top 40 and pop music. It airs a contemporary hit radio format. WHOT-FM is one of seven radio stations in the Youngstown market owned by Cumulus Media. It carries syndicated shows from Adam Bomb on afternoons and Carson Daly on Sunday mornings. The studios and transmitter are on Simon Road at Mayport Avenue in Boardman, using a Youngstown address.

== History ==
In November 1959, the station signed on the air. Its first call sign was WRED and it was the FM sister station to an AM station with the WHOT call letters. The two stations were owned by Myron Jones. FM 101.1 later had an album rock format in the late-1970s under the branding "The Wizard", which at the time used the call sign WSRD.

The connection between the WHOT call sign and the Top 40/CHR format is one of the longest running in modern radio history, dating back to 1955. The AM version of WHOT was one of the first Top 40 stations in the country. That station was a daytime-only signal licensed to Campbell, Ohio, on 1570 kHz (currently home to the Warren, Ohio-licensed WYWO). Despite its technical limitations, the station attained high ratings in the Youngstown radio market, which has lasted after several frequency moves: first to 1330 kHz in 1963 (now WGFT), then to 1390 kHz (now WNIO) in 1990.

On February 1, 1984, WSRD changed its call letters to WHOT-FM and the station began simulcasting its Top 40 AM station. By 1991, the AM and FM stations broke into separate programming with the 1390 kHz facility taking an adult standards format (one that would be revisited in 1999 when WNIO's call letters and format moved to that dial position), while the 101.1 MHz became the exclusive home of the Top 40 format. Excluding a period of several months when WHOT-FM carried an album rock format in late 1991-early 1992, the station has since continued playing Top 40 contemporary hits.

In August 1994, WHOT-FM and its AM counterpart, WBBW, were bought by Connoisseur Media for $5 million. In 2000, the stations were acquired by Cumulus Media.

On August 15, 2006, WHOT-FM became the first station in Eastern Ohio to broadcast in HD Radio; it ceased HD transmission in 2015.

After WAKZ switched to Urban on July 2, 2020 , WHOT was left as the only Top 40 station targeting Youngstown, though stations airing that format, like WAKS and WKST-FM can be heard in the area.
