= Steel Valley (Pittsburgh) =

Region in Appalachia

Coordinates: 40.444674°N 80.018268°W

The Southern Steel Valley is the area of post-industrial and industrial concentration along the upper Ohio River valley as well as the Monongahela River all the way to the West Virginia border. It has also included most of the Allegheny River, Beaver River and Youghiogheny River valleys. Most of the Pittsburgh metro area is considered part of "Steel Valley", as well as most of the Weirton-Steubenville-Wheeling Ohio/West Virginia, Morgantown/Fairmont West Virginia and East Liverpool/Youngstown/Mercer/New Castle Ohio and Pennsylvania metro areas. To locals in these regions the "Steel Valley" refers to towns and cities along the river shore, the school district and valley areas and not always the suburbs and cities at higher elevations, though the term has been used for the entire region. The Youngstown area of Ohio (as well as the Wheeling/Steubenville/Weirton area) though geographically and demographically connected to the "Steel Valley" retain many distinctions from the Steel Valley centered in Pittsburgh.

== History and heritage ==
Up until the post Civil War era, most of this valley was farm land and small surface or near-surface mining areas. Starting with the industrial boom that the Civil War demanded, the area rich in coal (a key industrial component for steel and iron making and thus the linchpin for most major industrial concerns) grew rapidly along the rivers of the region.

Among the men that the valley and its resources made famously wealthy were: Andrew Carnegie, Andrew Mellon, Henry Clay Frick, Henry Heinz, George Westinghouse, and Charles Schwab. Along with great wealth also came great waves of immigration into the area from Southern, Central and Eastern Europe as well as the great poverty of the non-unionized workers. In 1891 American labor peace was broken with the uprising of steel workers in Homestead, Pennsylvania. For days the city and its massive steel mill were taken over by the workers, repelling attacks by a small army of Henry Clay Frick (U.S. Steel) hired Pinkertons and local law enforcement until finally the issue was resolved by what would become the Pennsylvania National Guard.

From that seminal moment labor unions would tell the story of the valley and its industries. During World War I and II the valley was affectionately known as the "Arsenal of Democracy" for being the leading single source of American armaments and weaponry. In the 1980s most of the industry of the valley was rocked by the increasing globalization and cheap imports. Although allegations of "dumping" were well founded in some instances the increasing greed and short-sightedness of labor union leaders and the double speak of industrial leaders lead to a collapse of the valley's industrial might.

== Famous natives ==
- List of People from Pittsburgh

The Steel Valley is renowned for its contribution to world athletics. Many of these sport stars admit that as young men (or women) they had two choices: work in the mine or mill for 10 hours a day or excel at sports enough to win a scholarship and a career. Whatever the reason the valley is known as the "Cradle of Quarterbacks" as well as the "Cradle of Football" and the "Cradle of Running backs", Baseball, and Basketball are also represented well in the area and more recently hockey. Joe Namath, Tony Dorsett, Dan Marino, Joe Montana, Johnny Unitas, Curtis Martin, Ty Law, Kevan Barlow, Jim Kelly, and Mike Ditka all grew up in the actual geographic valley. From baseball the valley claims Ken Griffey Jr., Ken Griffey Sr., Stan Musial, Phil Niekro, Joe Niekro, Art Howe, Terry Francona, Honus Wagner, and Curt Leskanic. Basketball greats include John Havlicek, Pete Maravich John Calipari, and Myron Cope.

== See also ==
- Steel Valley (Ohio-Pennsylvania)
