= WYFM =

Coordinates: 41.057°N 80.639°W

- Sharon, Pennsylvania; United States
- Broadcast area: Youngstown, Ohio
- Frequency: 102.9 MHz
- Branding: Y-103

Programming
- Format: Classic rock
- Affiliations: Cleveland Browns Radio Network; Westwood One

Ownership
- Owner: Cumulus Media; (Cumulus Licensing LLC)
- Sister stations: WBBW, WHOT-FM, WPIC, WQXK, WRQX, WWIZ

History
- First air date: 1947 (as WPIC-FM)
- Former call signs: WPIC-FM (1947–1973)
- Call sign meaning: "Youngstown FM"

Technical information
- Facility ID: 60006
- Class: B
- ERP: 33,000 watts
- HAAT: 184 meters

Links
- Webcast: Listen Live; Listen Live via iHeart
- Website: y-103.com

WYFM (102.9 FM) is a commercial radio station that is licensed to Sharon, Pennsylvania, United States. Serving the Youngstown, Ohio market. With a classic rock format, it is one of eight radio stations in the Youngstown market that is owned by Cumulus Media. Its studios and transmitter are located at "The Radio Center" in Youngstown.

The station has a large coverage area and can be picked up fairly well even in Akron, and as far away as Erie, Pennsylvania. Within the large coverage area, WYFM competes with WNCD in Niles, WONE in Akron, WRQK in Canton, WFXJ in Ashtabula, WNCX in Cleveland, WRKT and WQHZ in Erie, and WDVE in Pittsburgh.

== History ==
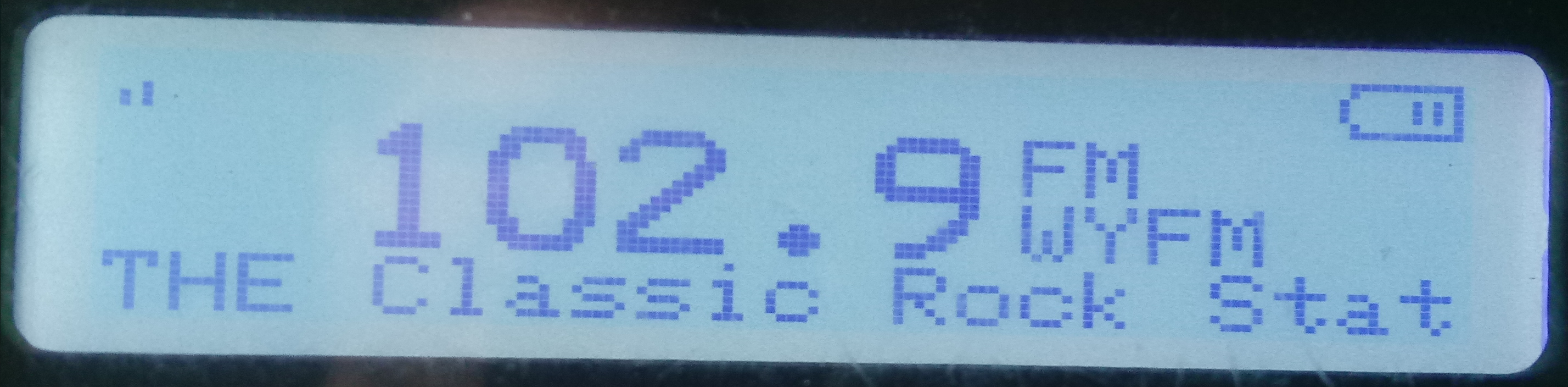
WYFM on a SPARC HD Radio with RDS.

WYFM originally signed on the air as WPIC-FM in 1947, simulcasting sister AM 790 WPIC until the early 1970s. The call letters were changed to WYFM in 1973.

From the early 1970s until November 1973, the station was known as "The Alternative at 102.9", following a music format that at the time was called "progressive" or "underground"; in effect, playing music that was not widely known and/or not readily available on the more popular AM radio stations. Typical playlists would include artists such as Jimi Hendrix, Janis Joplin, Cream and lesser-known rock and roll performers. Programmed by Ralph Caldwell with the consultancy of Edward John "Bo" Volz, it was the first station in the area to feature album-length selections and introduce new artists not heard on other stations. The announcers, including Holly, Dan, Vince, Jimmy, Ralph and others, followed the practice of the day by using only their first name in identifying themselves.

Following the regular broadcast of a local high school basketball game on November 30, 1973, the reformatted and newly named "Y-103" (with program director Dan Messersmith and consultant Ron White) took to the air, using a format known as "Top 40", and eschewing the traditional banter of disk jockeys in favor of continuous music (with the requisite commercial announcements). While "Y-103" sounded like what later was considered an "automated" station (i.e., computer driven), it was actually operated by "announcers" who spoke rarely if ever, following a strict format of preselected songs from a master playlist. Y-103's Top 40 format lasted until early 1985 when the station flipped to adult contemporary, running a mix of music from the 60s, 70s, and 80s. Its format had the similar formula from neighboring Cleveland's WMJI, which also can be heard in most of the Mahoning Valley. During its ten-year run as an adult contemporary station at the time, the station was notable on weekends for its popular oldies-request show as well as daily lunchtime request hour and its weeknight "Y-103 Classic Trax" show. Its original Y-103 personalities also became notable for their appearances on WYTV's MDA Telethons throughout much of the 1980s.

In August 1989, WYFM dropped both its Y-103 branding and all of its oldies titles and programs when the station rebranded as "Lite Rock 102.9", playing a more contemporary lite mix of then-current artists under the Top 40 formula, similar to Cleveland's WLTF at the time. WYFM was once also the only station in the Youngstown market to have Billboard Top 40 titles in 1991, due to CHR station WHOT-FM having a short lean towards AOR before flipping back to CHR the following year in 1992. At the time, Cleveland's CHR powerhouse WPHR can also be heard throughout most of Mahoning Valley as well with Grade B coverage in Youngstown and Grade A coverage in Warren. Another CHR station, WAKZ (then-known as "Z-96") also had a CHR format but its coverage primarily serves the Pennsylvania side of the market, and parts of Mahoning County. WYFM's Y-103 branding returned in 1995 when the station flipped to a classic hits format. A few years later, the station's format began tweaking towards classic rock, and its classic rock format was formed in 1998.

Y-103 originally broadcast from Pine Hollow Boulevard studios in Sharon, Pennsylvania, until November 1998, when the studios were moved to the "Radio Center" across the border in Youngstown, Ohio. The transmitter and antenna remained at the Pennsylvania location transmitting from, what was at the time of its construction the tallest self-support tower east of the Mississippi (500') until 2001. The Sharon tower has since been demolished.

Logo under previous slogan
