= WASN =

Radio station in Youngstown, Ohio (1976–2016)

Youngstown, Ohio; United States
- Broadcast area: Mahoning Valley
- Frequency: 1500 kHz

Programming
- Format: Defunct

Ownership
- Owner: Helen Bednarczyk; (Y-Town Radio Broadcasting, LLC)

History
- First air date: May 9, 1976
- Last air date: February 15, 2016
- Former call signs: WGFT (1976–2003)
- Call sign meaning: "The Answer"

Technical information
- Facility ID: 72100
- Class: D
- Power: 500 watts day 250 watts critical hours
- Transmitter coordinates: 41°6′26.00″N 80°34′57.00″W

WASN was a commercial daytime-only radio station licensed to serve Youngstown, Ohio at 1500 AM, and covered the Mahoning Valley region. The station broadcast from 1976 to 2013, with intermittent broadcasting over the next four years, and ceasing operations when the Federal Communications Commission (FCC) cancelled the license due to over a year of inactivity.

== History ==
The station formally signed on as WGFT on May 9, 1976, from its four-tower transmitter facilities at 617 Jacobs Road in Youngstown. The station was last owned by Helen Bednarczyk, through licensee Y-Town Radio Broadcasting, LLC.

Since January 1, 2010, WASN carried an urban-focused talk format. In addition to Syndication One hosts Warren Ballentine, Rev. Al Sharpton and Michael Baisden, previous formats have included gospel music and Spanish-language programming. The station streamed on a 24-hour basis, owing to WASN's daytime-only status (to protect WFED in Washington, D.C.).

WASN's sister station, WGFT (1330 AM), carries an oldies/classic hits format.

In February 2013, WGFT and sister station WASN were taken off air because of on-going technical reasons with a plan to return to the air by February 2014.

In February 2014, WGFT and WASN were sold by Bernard Ohio LLC to Y-Town Radio Broadcasting, LLC, who operates W232AI 93.7. The sale, at a purchase price of $16,501, was consummated on August 1, 2014.

On February 1, 2016, Y-Town Radio announced that WGFT, WASN, and W234CH would be sold to Laurel Highland Total Communications for $325,000. LHTC Media planned to relocate the translator to the Pittsburgh metro where it will simulcast adult standards WCNS (1480 AM).

On May 17, 2017, the Federal Communications Commission informed WASN that, as the station had been silent since at least February 15, 2016, it was in the process of cancelling the station's license; the license was canceled on June 29, 2017. As of May 2020, the tower site has not been dismantled.
