= WRQX (AM) =

Radio station in Salem-Youngstown, Ohio

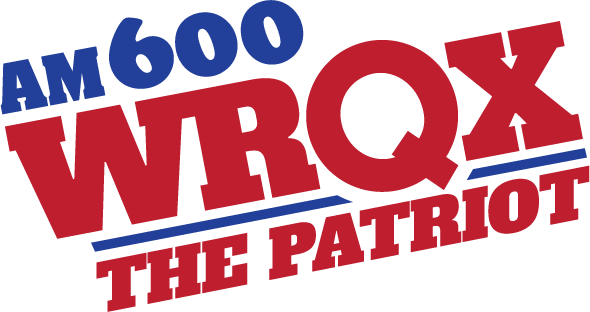
- Salem, Ohio; United States
- Broadcast area: Youngstown metropolitan area
- Frequency: 600 kHz
- Branding: AM 600 The Patriot

Programming
- Format: Talk radio
- Affiliations: Fox News Radio; Salem Radio Network; Westwood One

Ownership
- Owner: Cumulus Media; (Cumulus Licensing LLC)
- Sister stations: WBBW, WHOT-FM, WPIC, WQXK, WWIZ, WYFM

History
- First air date: June 25, 1965
- Former call signs: WSOM (1965–2019)
- Call sign meaning: "Parked" call sign after prior usage on the former WRQX in Washington, D.C.

Technical information
- Licensing authority: FCC
- Facility ID: 37547
- Class: D
- Power: 1,000 watts day 45 watts night
- Transmitter coordinates: 40°49′47″N 80°55′49″W

Links
- Public license information: Public file; LMS
- Webcast: Listen live
- Website: www.600wrqx.com

WRQX (600 AM), branded as "AM 600 The Patriot", is a commercial radio station licensed to Salem, Ohio, and serving the Youngstown metropolitan area. Owned by Cumulus Media, WRQX has a talk radio format. It is the local affiliate for Fox News Radio and carries talk shows from Salem Radio Network and co-owned syndicator Westwood One. The WRQX studios are located in "The Radio Center" in Youngstown.

WRQX is a Class D AM station. By day, it is powered at 1,000 watts. To protect other stations on 600 AM from interference, it reduces power at night to 45 watts. It uses a directional antenna with a two-tower array. The transmitter is on Winona Road at Butler Grange Road in Winona, near the Mahoning River. In addition to a standard analog transmission, WRQX is available online.

== History ==
=== WSOM ===
The station signed on the air on June 25, 1965 as WSOM, which stood for "The Wonderful Sound Of Music". The station first aired a Top 40 music format, and was followed by MOR in the 1970s, and adult contemporary in the mid-1980s. In 1989, the station flipped to an adult standards format. The lineup featured longtime Youngstown radio personalities Dick Thompson, Johnny Kay and Gary Rhamy. In its early years, WSOM was a daytimer, required to go off the air at night. It eventually got authorization to broadcast around the clock using low power at night.

WSOM changed to a talk radio format on December 13, 2010, mostly carrying an all-syndicated lineup in contrast to co-owned WPIC, one notable exception being a local afternoon show, Afternoons with Tracey and Friends. The station reverted to soft oldies and adult standards in September 2016, this time carrying programming from co-owned Westwood One's "America's Best Music".

WSOM changed formats again, this time to classic country, on December 26, 2016.

=== WRQX ===
Logo as a classic country station

With the Educational Media Foundation purchase of WRQX in Washington, D.C., the WRQX call sign–retained by Cumulus in the deal–was transferred to WSOM in a call sign "parking" move on May 31, 2019. Concurrently, the WSOM letters moved to the former WRQX until new calls were selected for that facility. With the switch to K-Love programming later that day, the former WRQX took the WLVW call sign. In addition, the new WRQX removed all instances of "WSOM" from its website and re-branded as "AM 600 WRQX," with updated imaging, logos and website domain.

On May 24, 2021, WRQX flipped to conservative talk radio, branded as "The Patriot". It began airing the Westwood One line up of conservative talk hosts.

== Programming ==
WRQX carries all nationally syndicated talk shows, mostly from Cumulus-owned Westwood One. Mornings begin with America in the Morning, a news magazine. Other programs carried include Chris Plante, Dan Bongino, Ben Shapiro, Matt Walsh, Mark Levin, Michael Knowles, Rich Eisen, Rich Valdes and Red Eye Radio.
