= WPIC =

Radio station in Sharon, Pennsylvania

- Sharon, Pennsylvania; United States
- Broadcast area: Youngstown metropolitan area
- Frequency: 790 kHz
- Branding: Newstalk 790

Programming
- Format: Talk radio
- Affiliations: Fox News Radio; Westwood One

Ownership
- Owner: Cumulus Media; (Cumulus Licensing LLC)
- Sister stations: WBBW, WHOT-FM, WQXK, WRQX, WWIZ, WYFM

History
- Former call signs: Sharon was a "Western Pennsylvania Production Center" at time of station's founding

Technical information
- Licensing authority: FCC
- Facility ID: 60005
- Class: D
- Power: 1,300 watts day 58 watts night
- Transmitter coordinates: 41°13′10.00″N 80°28′25.00″W

Links
- Public license information: Public file; LMS
- Webcast: Listen live
- Website: 790wpic.com

WPIC (790 AM) is a commercial radio station licensed to Sharon, Pennsylvania and serving the Youngstown metropolitan area. The station is owned by Cumulus Media and has a talk radio format.

WPIC is powered at 1,000 watts by day. To avoid interfering with other stations on 790 AM, it reduces power at night to 58 watts. It uses a non-directional antenna at all times. The transmitter is at Mercer Avenue at Pine Hollow Boulevard in Hermitage, Pennsylvania.

== Programming ==
Weekdays begin with the local morning news, then standard syndicated conservative talk shows, including those of Chris Plante, Dan Bongino, Ben Shapiro, Mark Levin, Red Eye Radio and America in the Morning. Weekdays the local talk shows include The Ron Errett show, The (Eric) Bombeck Show and The Mecer County Bulletin Board. The station carries coverage of local high school football and basketball during the school year. The station is a CBS News Radio affiliate.

On weekends, shows on money, health, law and religion are heard, as well as music and talk shows for the Greek, Italian and Polish communities. Weekend syndicated hosts include Bill Cunningham and Bill Handel.

== History ==
=== Founding ===
At the Heiges Radio Electric store, at 91 East State Street, sometime around 1932, the idea to build a radio station in Sharon PA was developed. In 1935, John Fahnline Jr. and George and Al Heiges entered into a contract. Eventually, the Sharon Herald newspaper, represented by A.W. McDowel, became involved in the project. Even though the name of the new corporation was The Sharon Herald Broadcasting Company, the station was not technically owned by the newspaper. John Fahnline Jr. and the Herald owned 40% each, with the Heiges Brothers in for a twenty percent stake. John Fahnline Jr. was installed as the president and GM of the station.

On October 25, 1938, the station signed on the air at 780 kilocycles. The opening ceremonies took place at 11:30 a.m.. These were the first words heard on Sharon's new radio station:

“Good morning, friends---you are now listening to radio station WPIC, the new broadcasting station of the Sharon Herald Broadcasting Company, at Sharon, Pennsylvania operating on a frequency of 780 kilocycles.”

The new station eschewed the standard schedule of radio soap operas and other scripted radio content of the day, concentrating on the start on local news, and classical music, including hourly newscasts, which had been the exclusive province of large-market radio stations at the time. The staff of the station's news wire, United Press International, warned Fahnline, "You’ll never pull it off," but he did. Despite objections, a booth was set up at The Herald so reporters-turned-announcers like Johnny Pepe could do news live on the air.

=== Move to 790 AM ===
Around 1941, the FCC put into effect the North American Regional Broadcasting Agreement (NARBA), which moved WBBM in Chicago to the 780 frequency as a clear-channel station. WPIC was moved to 790 in the frequency shift.

In the 1940s, some stations began to add FM stations to their facilities, and WPIC saw the need to expand into FM. It would require a doubling the size of the building and of the tower. An addition was added to the building and a new tower was constructed. The tower was no small project; when built, it would the tallest tower east of the Mississippi River at 547 feet high. On October 25, 1947, WPIC-FM signed on, timed to the anniversary of the AM station's own launch date.

In the pre rock-n-roll era WPIC primarily broadcast country music. Regional bands played live on WPIC, with many having their own shows. One of these regional groups was Woody Wooddell and The Ridin Rangers. Woody Woodell would go on to become an on-air host for the station. Because most other station did not have as many live acts as WPIC, and The Mutual Broadcasting System included many of WPIC’s live performances on its ten-station network.

=== Ownership change ===
As the fifties closed, Regional Broadcasting based in Meadville made an offer to buy the station, and in November 1959, WPIC-AM/FM were sold for $510,000.

In 1960, WPIC announcer Joe Jansen, in what was possibly a station sanctioned stunt, decide to lock himself in the studio. It was October and Pittsburgh Pirates were playing the New York Yankees in the World Series. Joe decided to play “Beat Em Bucs” for five straight hours. Listeners caught up in baseball fever began coming to the Pine Hollow Blvd. studios in droves. By mid-day, the Hickory Twp. police showed up and said it would have to stop. They pleaded with Jansen to unlock the doors and he was able to keep his job. WPIC-FM's calls were changed to the current-day WYFM in 1973.

=== Cumulus Media ===
In December 1996, Regional Broadcasting sold the stations to Connoisseur Communications owned by 35 year-old Jeff Warshaw. WWIZ (103.9 FM) and WLLF (96.7 FM) were purchased and added to the roster of stations. In 2000, Warshaw sold all of the stations along with 35 other ones to Cumulus Media for $258 million.

Consolidation continued, and Cumulus would eventually buy WHOT-FM and country powerhouse WQXK and relocate them on Simon Road in Youngstown. WPIC-FM left Pine Hollow in 2000.

On December 2, 2016, the historic Pine Hollow Blvd. studios were closed and the station was moved to a new location at 1965 Shenanago Valley Freeway in Hermitage.
