= WGRP =

Radio station in Greenville, Pennsylvania

- Greenville, Pennsylvania; United States
- Broadcast area: Sharon, Pennsylvania; Hermitage, Pennsylvania; Youngstown, Ohio
- Frequency: 940 kHz
- Branding: 92.7 FM 940 AM WGRP

Programming
- Format: Hot adult contemporary

Ownership
- Owner: Vilkie Communications
- Sister stations: WMVL

History
- First air date: September 19, 1959
- Call sign meaning: Greenville, Pennsylvania

Technical information
- Licensing authority: FCC
- Facility ID: 25227
- Class: D
- Power: 1,000 watts day; 2 watts night
- Transmitter coordinates: 41°23′10″N 80°24′35″W
- Translator: 92.7 W224DW (Greenville)

Links
- Public license information: Public file; LMS
- Webcast: Listen live
- Website: wgrpradio.com

WGRP (940 AM) is a licensed Class D radio station broadcasting from Greenville, Pennsylvania. WGRP broadcasts full-time. However, it only sends out 2 watts in the nighttime hours, in order to protect a Canadian and Mexican clear-channel (940 AM) which is reserved by international treaty. The Canadian Class A station is no longer on the air; the Mexican station is XEQ in Mexico City.

== FM translator ==
WGRP relays programming to an FM translator in order to improve coverage, especially at night when the AM frequency broadcasts with only 2 watts. The FM frequency also gives improved high fidelity stereophonic sound.

Broadcast translator for WGRP
Call sign	Frequency	City of license	FID	ERP (W)	Class	FCC info
W224DW	92.7 FM	Greenville, Pennsylvania	201585	100	D	LMS

WGRP along with WMVL 101.7 FM in Linesville, Pennsylvania, are owned by Vilkie Communications, and both feature an oldies format. Previously, WGRP and WLOA, along with former sister station WEXC were owned by Beacon Broadcasting, operated by Warren-based steel supply magnate Harold Glunt. After his death in January 2010, Glunt's surviving son put the stations up for sale. Educational Media Foundation acquired all three stations, with the intention to spin off WGRP and WLOA to separate owners.

== 2 watt nighttime broadcast ==
International treaty requires WGRP to broadcast at only 2 watts during night hours. This is to allow uninterrupted broadcasting of CFNV in Montreal, Quebec, which occupies the same frequency (this allocation was previously assigned to CBM and CINW). When the Montreal station is off the air, and despite the night-time power limitation, listeners have reported hearing WGRP across much of northeast North America at night. WGRP, at local sunset, must reduce power to either 17 watts or 7 watts, for first two hours after the sunset time for that month. Some months allow the station to run 17 watts for the first hour after sunset, then 7 watts the second hour, then to the two watts nighttime. Some months, mostly in summer, the station is limited to the 7 watts for both hours of post sunset operation.

Station operates same directional pattern day and night.

Many DX-ers, those that try to listen to distant stations as a hobby, have asked about if the station operates at a true 2 watts at night. Station officials have confirmed it, as an unusual antenna current meter, one measuring in milli-amps, has been used by current owners to confirm. Even they were surprised by the coverage of the station at night.

== History ==
WGRP first signed on September 19, 1959, under the ownership of Greenville Broadcasting Company, headed by Kenneth Anderson and (November 8, 1911 – January 1978), who served as general manager and chief engineer, and his wife Ethel Brown Anderson, with his brother Merle Anderson (August 31, 1919 – September 19, 2000) serving as station manager and program director. The station first operated from studios located at 2 Water Street in downtown Greenville, and operated at its current frequency, daytime power output, and directional antenna pattern. However, the station did not have nighttime power authorization in these early years. In later years, the station would move all of its operations to an office constructed at its transmitter facility at 44 McCracken Road in West Salem Township, just outside the Greenville corporate limits.

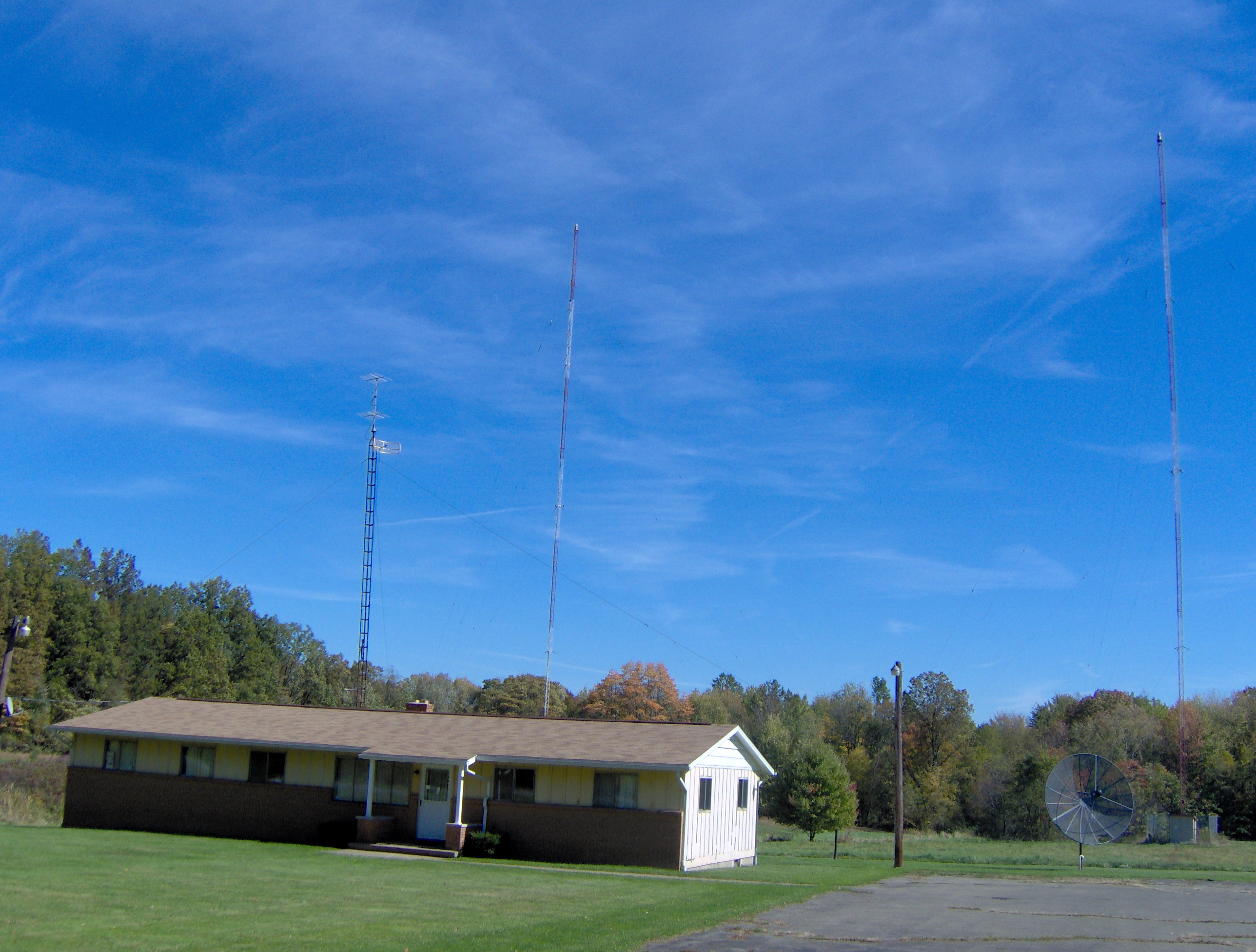
WGRP transmitter facility and former studio building, located at 44 McCracken Road, West Salem Township, about two miles from downtown Greenville.

In 1964, Greenville Broadcasting Company was issued the construction permit for WGRP-FM 107.1, known today as WLRF. Once it went on the air in July 1965, WGRP-FM simulcast its AM sister, but was able to provide nighttime radio service independently after WGRP was mandated to close at sundown.

In early 1978, Kenneth Anderson died. After his death, Merle Anderson assumed the duties of president and general manager.

Greenville Broadcasting Company continued its ownership of the stations into the 1990s, when both were sold to Beacon Broadcasting.

In December 2003, Vilkie Communications LMA'ed then-dark WGRP, until changes in management at Beacon decided not to sell. At this time, Harold Glunt took over operations of Beacon Broadcasting.

Prior to Glunt's death, WGRP was simulcasting sister station WLOA with a classic country format, then moving briefly to all-sports, then oldies, and then reverted to country with local broadcasters such as Tony Horn (in the morning), & Johnny "Rogers" Kuty (afternoons), with a short stint by local talent Gregg "Allen" Robison as "Porky" broadcasting Porky's Pen at 10. Both stations were once Mercer County outlets for Pittsburgh Pirates baseball, which later moved to competing station WLLF. Previously, the two stations carried an oldies format that originated from then-sister station WANR.

WLOA and WGRP, along with WEXC in Greenville, Pennsylvania, and Ohio stations WANR and WRTK were all stations of Beacon Broadcasting.

On September 10, 2010, Educational Media Foundation announced its purchase of WLOA, WGRP and WEXC for a combined $225,000; all three stations since changed formats to relay the national non-commercial K-Love feed, while EMF sold WLOA and WGRP to different owners.

WGRP and WLOA were sold to former LMA operator of WGRP, Vilkie Communications of Meadville, Pennsylvania, a locally owned broadcast company. The sale was completed in December, and both stations broke away from the K-Love feed for local programming.

=== FCC violations ===
On November 15, 2002, WGRP was issued a Notice of Apparent Liability for Forfeiture (NAL). The violations involved Beacon's failure to post the Antenna Structure Registration (ASR) numbers on the WGRP(AM) antenna structures, failure to notify the Federal Aviation Administration (FAA) that the obstruction lighting was improperly functioning, and failure to repaint the WGRP(AM) antenna structures. Beacon Broadcasting was fined $15,000 for the violations.

On October 29, 2010, WGRP was issued a Notice of Apparent Liability for Forfeiture (NAL), for failing to maintain a public inspection file and exceeding nighttime broadcast power. FCC inspectors determined that nighttime transmission power was 26 watts (the transmitter was programmed to reduce to 28 watts at night), exceeding the licensed nighttime power output of 2 watts.
