= WAPS (FM) =

Radio station in Akron, Ohio

- Akron, Ohio; United States
- Broadcast area: Summit County; Akron metro area (limited)
- Frequency: 91.3 MHz (HD Radio)
- Branding: The Summit FM

Programming
- Format: Adult Album Alternative
- Subchannels: HD2: Alternative; HD3: Rock and Recovery
- Affiliations: NPR

Ownership
- Owner: Akron Public Schools; (Board of Education, Akron City School District)

History
- First air date: September 1955
- Former frequencies: 89.1 MHz (1955–1994)
- Call sign meaning: Akron Public Schools

Technical information
- Licensing authority: FCC
- Facility ID: 6051
- Class: A
- ERP: 2,000 watts (analog); 80 watts (digital)
- HAAT: 106 meters (348 ft)
- Transmitter coordinates: 41°03′18.00″N 81°31′35.00″W
- Translator: 90.1 W211BT (Athens)
- Repeater: 90.7 WKTL (Struthers)

Links
- Public license information: Public file; LMS
- Webcast: Listen live
- Website: thesummit.fm

WAPS (91.3 MHz) is a non-commercial educational FM radio station licensed to Akron, Ohio. Owned and operated by Akron Public Schools, the station airs an Adult Album Alternative (AAA) format as “91.3 the Summit”. WAPS has a standard analog transmission and broadcasts to over three HD Radio channels and is available online.

WAPS primarily serves the Akron metro area but also simulcasts over a single full power repeater: WKTL (90.7 FM), licensed to Struthers, and operated by Struthers High School, which broadcasts the WAPS signal to the Youngstown metro area, as well as translator W211BT, licensed to Athens.

== Funding ==
Non-commercial WAPS relies on listener membership subscriptions and donations for much of its annual revenue. Additional funding is provided by local and regional businesses and organizations, which underwrite station programming, and grant funds from local and regional philanthropic organizations. The station receives a Community Service Grant from the Corporation For Public Broadcasting. As of 2009, it receives no direct financial support from owner Akron Public Schools.

== Signal ==
Founded in September 1955, WAPS originally broadcast on 89.1 until moving to 91.3 in August 1994 to increase signal coverage. The station moved the transmitter site in December 2002 from the original antenna on top of the studio building at 70 North Broadway Street to the WVPX television tower to increase signal coverage to points west and south of Akron. In October 2008, WAPS installed a digital transmitter and panel antenna system to maximize the 2,000-watt signal and to begin broadcasting on HD Radio. As part of the HD radio initiative, it launched a HD2 audio channel originally named "Summit Flashbacks," offering a commercial-free mix of "new wave" inspired music from the years 1976 through 1994. This channel was rebranded as "The 330", with music produced by artists from northeast Ohio.

In June 2010, WAPS launched a HD3 station for children called Kidjam! Radio. Kidjam! Radio aimed "to embrace technology by combining high-quality entertainment with a solid foundation for strengthening self-esteem, providing simple steps to good nutrition and developing a positive attitude." The station hac its own website, which included a live online audio stream: www.kidjamradio.com. Kidjam! Radio appears to have quietly gone defunct June of 2024.

In September 2011, Rock & Recovery launched a multimedia subscription-free service for those in addiction recovery, their families, and health care professionals. The inaugural broadcast took place on September 15 from Stan Hywet Hall and Gardens.

== Recognition ==
WAPS was nominated by Radio and Records Magazine's Industry Achievement Awards as "Triple A Radio Station of the Year: Markets 50+ Noncommercial" in 2006 and 2008. Readers of the local publication Akron Life and Leisure Magazine voted WAPS as "Best Radio Station" in 2006, 2007, 2009 and 2010.

WAPS was listed as one of the "40 Best Little Radio Stations in the U.S." by Paste Magazine in 2010. The station was also recognized as the "Volunteer of the Year" by Akron Public Schools in 2010 for their Music Alive instrument donation program.
