= WWNW =

- New Wilmington, Pennsylvania; United States
- Broadcast area: Youngstown, Ohio
- Frequency: 88.9 MHz
- Branding: Titan Radio

Programming
- Format: Adult contemporary

Ownership
- Owner: Westminster College Board of Trustees

History
- First air date: January 31, 1968 (as WKPS)
- Former call signs: WKPS (1968–1981)
- Call sign meaning: We're New Wilmington

Technical information
- Licensing authority: FCC
- Facility ID: 72031
- Class: A
- ERP: 4,000 watts
- HAAT: 33 meters
- Transmitter coordinates: 41°6′41.00″N 80°20′21.00″W

Links
- Public license information: Public file; LMS
- Website: WWNW Online

WWNW (88.9 FM) is a radio station licensed to New Wilmington, Pennsylvania, United States, The station serves the Pennsylvania college area. The station is currently owned by the Westminster College Board of Trustees.

== History ==
The station first signed on January 31, 1968 at its present frequency of 88.9 MHz but with an output power of 39 watts and the call letters of WKPS, operating about 10 hours a day. The station had a diverse, free form format typical of most college radio stations. Jerome Henderson served as the station's first general manager and director of broadcasting. By 1981, the station changed its call letters to WWNW, increased its power to 110 watts, expanded its broadcast day to 18 hours daily, and David L. Barner, now Chairman of the college's Department of Communications Studies, Theatre and Art, joined the station as the director of broadcasting.

Under Barner's direction, the station experienced its biggest changes into what it is today. Barner, a solid veteran with years of experience at all levels and job types associated with broadcasting, felt that in order for students to be successful in broadcasting, they had to have a combination of considerable hands-on lab experience at either a campus or commercial broadcast facility, and classroom work that was practical and adaptable to this career path. Barner's belief was that in order for this to happen, the campus radio station had to have the sound and feel of a major market commercial radio facility, with coursework taught by seasoned broadcast professionals.

Unlike many stations on the non-commercial FM band, WWNW is programmed much like a commercially formatted for-profit enterprise, rather than a free-form program-based format often found at most college radio stations. The most obvious exception is the lack of commercials, which are replaced by logged public service announcements, station promos, and underwritings at certain points during the broadcast day.

Since the early 80's, WWNW has programmed a mass-appeal format of adult contemporary music, first using the moniker "Hit Radio 89", with local newscasts relative to the community. Over the years, the station was named after the school mascot, taking the name "Titan Radio", in an effort to enhance school spirit, but the programming elements remained the same.

The station was granted permission to increase its power to its current level of 4,000 watts in 2008, giving it a signal comparable to most small market FM stations on the commercial dial spectrum.

== Station information ==
All on-air personnel are required to adhere to a structured format and tightly controlled playlist. Disc jockeys are restricted to Broadcast and Digital Communications majors who desire to pursue a career in broadcasting after graduation, unlike most college stations that are run more on a public access basis, open to any student regardless of major, as well as the local community. They typically work airshifts of four or five hours as they would on a commercial radio station, as the "lab" portion of their coursework. Those who do not show up for their shifts without advance notice are given a failing grade and dismissed from the program.

Because of WWNW's serious approach to broadcasting, the station is frequently heard in local businesses in the New Wilmington area, who support the station through grant underwritings. The station also has been recognized for at least five years running as one of the Best College Radio Stations in the U.S. by The Princeton Review.
