= WKTL =

Semi-satellite of WAPS, Akron, OH
- Struthers, Ohio; United States
- Broadcast area: Youngstown-Warren
- Frequency: 90.7 MHz
- Branding: 91.3 The Summit

Programming
- Format: Adult album alternative Nationality (Saturdays only)

Ownership
- Owner: Struthers Board of Education; (Board of Education Struthers Ohio City Schools)

History
- First air date: September 13, 1965
- Call sign meaning: We're the Key to Learning

Technical information
- Licensing authority: FCC
- Facility ID: 4267
- Class: B1
- ERP: 13,500 watts
- HAAT: 7.0 meters (23.0 ft)
- Transmitter coordinates: 41°3′6.00″N 80°35′56.00″W

Links
- Public license information: Public file; LMS
- Website: thesummit.fm

WKTL (90.7 FM) is a non-commercial radio station broadcasting a Variety format from Struthers High School. Licensed to Struthers, Ohio, United States, the station serves the Youngstown-Warren area. The station is currently owned by the Struthers Board of Education and the broadcast studio is located inside the Struthers Fieldhouse.

Outside of local nationality programming on Saturdays, WKTL's programming is provided by Akron Public Schools-owned WAPS 91.3 FM "The Summit" in Akron, which airs an adult album alternative (AAA) music format.

== History ==
WKTL began broadcasting on September 13, 1965. and the station's website claims it was the first all student-staffed radio station in the country.

The station was conceived by Struthers High School speech instructor Stephen J. Gercevich, a former radio announcer, to "provide a unique laboratory to put classroom techniques to use".
