= WYSU =

- Youngstown, Ohio; United States
- Frequency: 88.5 MHz (HD Radio)

Programming
- Format: Public radio
- Subchannels: HD2: Classical music
- Affiliations: National Public Radio

Ownership
- Owner: Youngstown State University

History
- First air date: October 23, 1969
- Call sign meaning: Youngstown State University

Technical information
- Licensing authority: FCC
- Facility ID: 74434
- Class: B
- ERP: 50,000 watts
- HAAT: 114.7 m (376 ft)
- Transmitter coordinates: 41°03′24″N 80°38′44″W
- Translators: 88.1 W201DP (Ashtabula, Ohio); 89.7 W209CQ (New Wilmington, PA)

Links
- Public license information: Public file; LMS
- Webcast: Listen Live
- Website: wysu.org

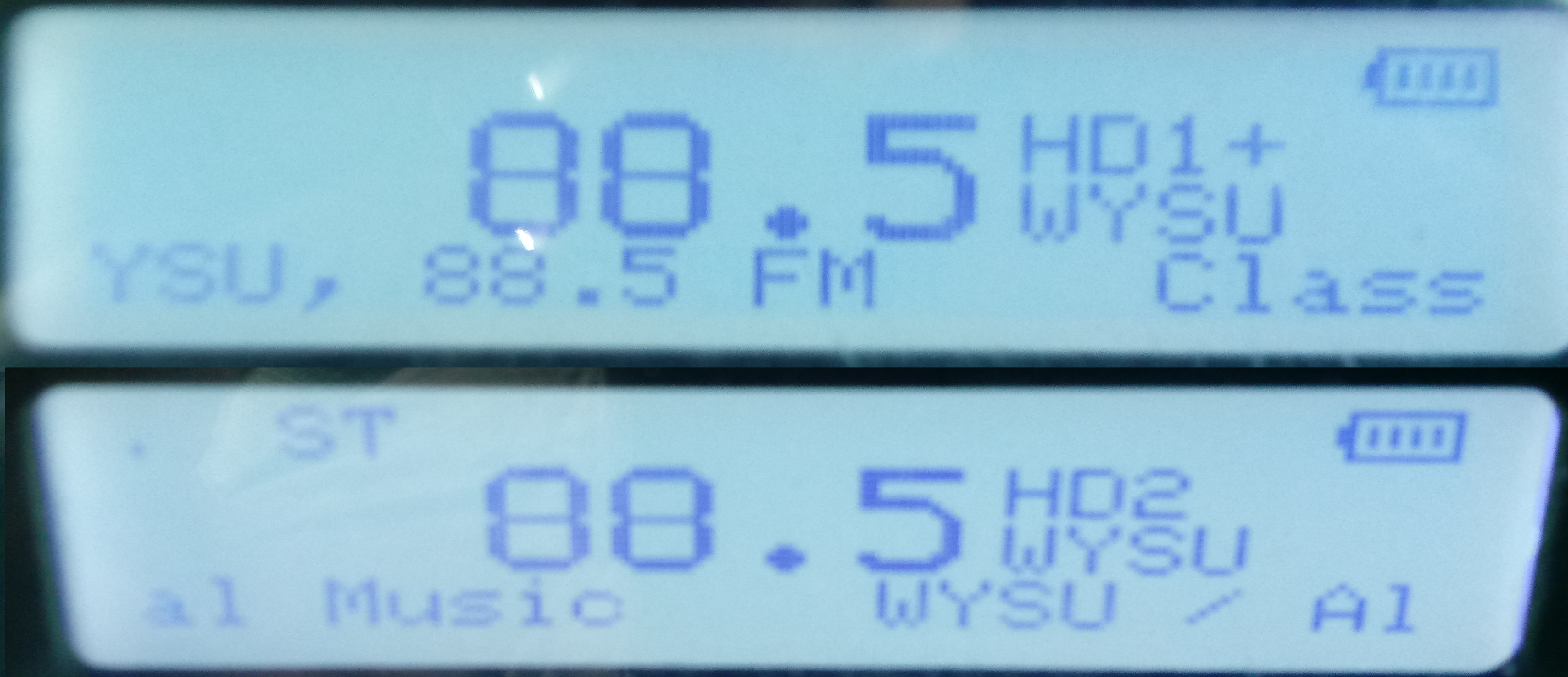
WYSU's HD Radio Channels on a SPARC Radio with PSD.

WYSU (88.5 FM, "Radio You Need to Know") is a National Public Radio member radio station. Licensed to serve Youngstown, Ohio, United States, the station is currently owned by Youngstown State University.

WYSU also hosts the Youngstown Radio Reading Service, which broadcasts on a subcarrier.

== History ==
- 1967: Don Elser, Steve Grcevich, and YSU President Albert Pugsley propose a fine arts radio station for Youngstown State University and the Mahoning Valley Community
- 1969:
  - At 10:00 a.m. October 23, WYSU-FM signs on the air at 88.5 MHz as a charter member of National Public Radio, broadcasting 12 hours daily from its studios in room 310 of the former Valley Park Motel on Wick Avenue. Original staff members were:
    - Steve Grcevich, Director of Telecommunications
    - Bill Foster, Announcer/Record Librarian
    - Polly Golden, Secretary
    - Lew Moler, Chief Engineer
    - Richard Stevens, Program Director
  - Began airing All Things Considered
  - Aired first edition of Folk Festival with Charles Darling
- 1971: Became part of the first radio network using satellite delivery of programs
- 1972: Aired first edition of Now's The Time with Martin Berger
- 1973: Began airing Saturday Night on Broadway with Don Elser
- 1974: Began 18-hour broadcast day
- 1976: Moved studios to newly built Cushwa Hall
- 1980:
  - Began 24-hour broadcast day
  - First on-air fundraiser
- 1985:
  - Morning Edition began
  - Robert Peterson named director
- 1987:
  - Bill Foster passes away
  - Barbara Krauss named announcer/producer
- 1988: Ann Cliness named announcer/producer
- 1990: Began summer bus excursions to Blossom Music Center
- 1991:
  - Began operation of new 50,000 watt transmitter with antenna moved to WKBN tower
  - Aired live coverage of the first Gulf War
- 1993: Ashtabula translator began operation at 90.1 FM
- 1995: New Wilmington translator began operation at 89.9
- 1996:
  - Added state-of-the-art digital editing equipment
  - Sponsored first Mad About The Arts
  - Automated overnight programs
- 1997: Added political affairs program Commentary Cafe
- 1998:
  - Michael Cervone named announcer/producer
  - Improved New Wilmington signal by moving translator to 97.5 FM
- 2000:
  - First station-sponsored European tour: Great Britain
  - Gary Sexton named director of broadcasting
  - Added website & streaming audio
  - Initiated Robert W. Peterson Scholarship
- 2001:
  - David Luscher named associate director
  - Aired live coverage of 9/11
  - Expanded news programming
- 2003:
  - Began broadcasting Youngstown 2010 simulcasts with PBS 45 &49
  - Added A Prairie Home Companion
- 2004: Installed digital equipment in the broadcast studios
- 2006: Began first strategic planning process since station made its debut
- 2007:
  - Began broadcasting in HD (digital)
  - Began Lincoln Avenue community affairs program
- 2008:
  - Added all-classical HD channel
  - Added all-classical Internet stream

== Translators ==
WYSU simulcasts on two low-power transmitters: W201DP in Ashtabula, broadcasting on 88.1 MHz with 38 watts, and W209CQ in New Wilmington, Pennsylvania, broadcasting on 89.7 MHz with 27 watts.
