= WQXK =

Country radio station in Salem-Youngstown, Ohio

Coordinates: 40.886°N 80.832°W

- Salem, Ohio; United States
- Broadcast area: Youngstown metropolitan area; Mahoning Valley
- Frequency: 105.1 MHz
- Branding: K-105

Programming
- Format: Country
- Affiliations: Westwood One

Ownership
- Owner: Cumulus Media; (Cumulus Licensing LLC)
- Sister stations: WBBW, WHOT-FM, WPIC, WRQX, WWIZ, WYFM

History
- First air date: November 25, 1958; 67 years ago (as WSOM-FM)
- Former call signs: WFMJ-FM (1947–54); WSOM-FM (1958–80)

Technical information
- Licensing authority: FCC
- Facility ID: 37548
- Class: B
- ERP: 88,000 watts
- HAAT: 136 meters (446 ft)

Links
- Public license information: Public file; LMS
- Webcast: Listen live
- Website: k105country.com

WQXK (105.1 FM, "K-105") is a commercial radio station, licensed to Salem, Ohio, and serving the Youngstown metropolitan area and the Mahoning Valley. It is one of eight radio stations in the Youngstown radio market owned by Cumulus Media and broadcasts a country music radio format. The studios and offices are in "The Radio Center" in Youngstown.

WQXK has an effective radiated power of 88,000 watts. While most FM stations in the region are limited to 50,000 watts, WQXK is grandfathered at its unusually high power. The transmitter is off Franklin Avenue in Salem.

== History ==
=== WFMJ-FM ===
The 105.1 spot on the dial was originally WFMJ-FM and was licensed to Youngstown. The call letters spelled out the initials of its founder, William F. Maag, Jr. He was also publisher of The Youngstown Vindicator, and owned WFMJ (1390 AM). Maag also put WFMJ-TV channel 21 on the air in 1953.

WFMJ-FM was issued a construction permit in 1947, but the station did not go on the air until January 1950. Few people owned FM radios in those days and there was little prospect of the station becoming profitable. Only a few years later, WFMJ Broadcasting Company requested that the Federal Communications Commission (FCC) cancel the WFMJ-FM license, which occurred on January 5, 1954.

=== WSOM-FM ===
WSOM-FM, a new station in Salem, signed on the air on November 25, 1958. WSOM-FM was owned by Salem Broadcasting Company, which added an AM station in 1965, 600 WSOM (today WRQX). At first, the two stations simulcast. But by the late 1970s, the FM station had switched to a country music format.

Rust Communications Group purchased WSOM-AM-FM on December 13, 1979. This was the first of many ownership changes that occurred over the next several years.

=== WQXK ===
To give it a separate identity, WSOM-FM's call sign was changed to WQXK in January 1980. Cumulus Media acquired WQXK and WSOM in 2000.

WQXK has been nominated numerous times for CMA Small Market Radio Station of the Year. WQXK took home the prestigious award in November 2004. K105 is also a participant in the "Country Cares for Kids St. Jude Radiothon." The station has raised over $3,000,000 since the partnership began in the early 1990s.

=== Grandfathered power ===
The station broadcasts 88,000 watts, which exceeds the FCC's current maximum power output of 50,000 watts. It is grandfathered at the higher power by virtue of its being in operation before the limit was introduced. The transmitter is located between Salem and Leetonia on State Route 344, just outside the Salem city limits. The most powerful station in the region, it covers not only Youngstown but also can be picked up in Akron, Canton, Cleveland, Erie, Pittsburgh, and Wheeling/Steubenville markets.

In part, due to the station's strong signal, WQXK is the highest-rated station in the Youngstown radio market, often attracting out-of-market listeners. K105's signal can be picked up clearly in over 20 counties in 3 states (Ohio, Pennsylvania, and West Virginia). It has occasionally reached the suburbs of Columbus, Ohio, under the right weather conditions.

Though, in Pittsburgh, it gets knocked out by translator W286CZ , licensed to Greensburg, Pennsylvania , also on 105.1.
