= WGFT =

Radio station in Campbell–Youngstown, Ohio

- Campbell, Ohio; United States
- Broadcast area: Youngstown metropolitan area
- Frequency: 1330 kHz
- Branding: Star 94.7

Programming
- Format: Classic hits
- Affiliations: NBC News Radio

Ownership
- Owner: Bloom Broadcasting

History
- First air date: October 16, 1955
- Former call signs: WHOT (1955–90); WFNV (1990); WYWR (1990–92); WZKC (1992–93); WASN (1993–2003)
- Former frequencies: 1570 kHz (1955–63)
- Call sign meaning: former "Gift" nickname

Technical information
- Licensing authority: FCC
- Facility ID: 74164
- Class: D
- Power: 500 watts day
- Transmitter coordinates: 41°5′21.00″N 80°36′55.00″W
- Translator: 94.7 W234CH (Girard)

Links
- Public license information: Public file; LMS
- Webcast: Listen live
- Website: 947-star.com

WGFT (1330 AM) – branded as "Star 94.7" – is a commercial daytime-only radio station licensed to Campbell, Ohio. WGFT also simulcasts over Girard translator W234CH (94.7 FM).

The WGFT studios are located in Liberty Liberty, while the transmitter for WGFT resides on Blaine Avenue in Youngstown's Hazelton neighborhood; W234CH's transmitter is located on Sunset Drive in Youngstown's Pleasant Grove neighborhood. In addition to a standard analog transmission, WGFT is available online.

== History ==
Prior to 1990, this station was the original home of WHOT, one of the first Top 40 stations in the country. Originally a daytime-only station that signed on October 16, 1955, licensed to the town of Campbell, Ohio, WHOT was founded by Myron Jones and Bill Fleckinstein, who first signed on WJET in Erie, Pennsylvania on the 1570 frequency as a daytimer. After upgrading WJET to a full-time signal on the 1400 kHz frequency in 1955, Jones and Fleckinstein used the now-opened 1570 frequency to establish WHOT in the Youngstown suburb of Campbell, Ohio as a 250 watt non-directional daytime-only station. At the time, the station had to sign off at nighttime in order to protect clear channel XERF in Ciudad Acuña, and for a period WHOT was the only daytimer in the Youngstown market.

Despite the technical limitations, WHOT rose to the top of the local ratings in the Youngstown area. Longtime broadcaster Dick Biondi was the afternoon host on WHOT at this time, while Al DeJulio and "Boots" Bell hosted rival local TV teen dance music programs; DeJulio hosted "45 Hop" on WXTV (Channel 45) while Bell hosted "Dance Party" on WYTV (Channel 33). In 1963, WHOT moved to the 1330 frequency as a full-time operation, continuing with the top 40 format; the 1570 frequency was reallocated to Warren, Ohio and another station, WTCL, was established in 1971.

After moving the format to WHOT-FM (101.1) in 1984, WHOT was sold off to WVBR, Inc. on February 16, 1990 for $290,000; concurrently, WHOT, Inc. acquired WFMJ (1390 AM) from The Vindicator Publishing Company for $230,000 that April 23. A second incarnation of WHOT on the AM dial was launched on the former WFMJ that May 28, at the same time, this station temporarily switched call letters to WFNV, then switched again to WYWR on October 8. By July 6, 1992, the station changed its call sign to WZKC, then to WASN on November 15, 1993, and swapped callsigns with WGFT on December 1, 2003.

The station switched from a gospel music format to a talk/personality format in December 2007. The WGFT calls refer to the station's former gospel music format ("The Gift"), which now resides on sister station WASN AM 1500. It was a full-time station until around 2000, when its night power was voluntarily relinquished. However, their web streaming now operates on a 24-hour basis, along with sister station (and fellow daytimer) WGFT.

In addition to Don Imus, Laura Ingraham, Dave Ramsey, Sean Hannity and Mark Levin, the station featured a local daily talk radio show hosted by Louie Free. Free's show originated on sister station WASN until January 1, 2010, when WASN changed from a Hispanic and gospel music format to carry urban-oriented news/talk programming; Free moved to WYCL and WHTX the following year.

WGFT changed its format to classic hits early in 2012.

In February 2013, WGFT and sister station WASN were taken off the air due to on-going technical reasons with a plan to return to the air by February 2014.

In June 2013, an application was filed with the Federal Communications Commission for WGFT to be rebroadcast on 94.3 FM owned by Helen M. Bednarczyk, wife of WGFT and WASN general manager Ted "Skip" Bednarczyk.

In February 2014, WGFT and WASN were sold by Bernard Radio LLC to Y-Town Radio Broadcasting, LLC, which operates W232AI 93.7. The sale, at a price of $16,501, was consummated on August 1, 2014.

On May 11, 2014, at 10 am, after broadcasting only the sound of a ticking clock for three days, WGFT launched an urban adult contemporary format being simulcast on Niles FM W232AI 93.7, as Star 93.7, launching with 5,000 songs in a row commercial-free. The first song on Star was Black or White by Michael Jackson.

WGFT flipped to sports radio on April 7, 2025, as an ESPN Radio affiliate.

On June 5, 2026, WGFT dropped its sports radio format and began stunting with music themed around dogs as "Taco 94.7". The stunt claimed that a Chihuahua named "Taco" had taken over the station's studios and locked out the entire staff. A new format was set to debut on June 8 at 12 pm; in the Fall 2025 Nielsen books, WGFT failed to overtake iHeartMedia's Fox-affiliated WNIO, only holding a 0.3 share, compared to WNIO's 0.5. At the time promised, the station flipped to a classic hits format as Star 94.7, reviving the "Star" branding that had previously been used by the station. The move returns a classic hits-based station to the market after the 2025 flip of WWIZ from oldies to adult contemporary.

== FM translator ==
Broadcast translator for WGFT
| Call sign | Frequency | City of license | FID | ERP (W) | HAAT | Class | Transmitter coordinates | FCC info |
|---|---|---|---|---|---|---|---|---|
| W234CH | 94.7 FM | Girard, Ohio | 56248 | 160 | 293 m (961 ft) | D | 41°3′25.2″N 80°38′42.00″W | LMS |
