= WLRF =

Coordinates: 41.381°N 80.413°W

- Greenville, Pennsylvania; United States
- Broadcast area: Youngstown, Ohio
- Frequency: 107.1 MHz

Programming
- Format: Contemporary Christian music
- Network: K-Love

Ownership
- Owner: Educational Media Foundation
- Sister stations: WYLR

History
- First air date: July 1965
- Former call signs: WGRP-FM (1965–1985); WEXC (1985–2011, 2026); WLVX (2011–2026)

Technical information
- Licensing authority: FCC
- Facility ID: 25225
- Class: A
- ERP: 2,100 watts
- HAAT: 119 meters (390 ft)

Links
- Public license information: Public file; LMS
- Website: www.klove.com

WLRF (107.1 FM) is a radio station that is licensed to Greenville, Pennsylvania, and broadcasts the K-Love network to communities including Hermitage and Mercer.

It began broadcasting as WGRP-FM in 1965 before changing call signs to WEXC in 1985. It operated several secular commercial formats before being acquired in 1998 by Beacon Broadcasting, which programmed a Christian rock format before flipping to hot adult contemporary. Beacon sold the station to the Educational Media Foundation, owner of K-Love, in 2010.

== Broadcast history ==
WLRF was originally a locally focused voice for the communities of Greenville, Pennsylvania, the Shenango Valley, and Youngstown, Ohio. The 107.1 frequency was first registered as WGRP-FM, a sister signal to the then co-owned WGRP (940 AM). The WEXC calls were first registered for 107.1 on May 16, 1985.

The first DJ hired on WEXC was J. Robert Irvine, (Bob James) until 1986 when he moved to television at WYTV, WTAE-TV and KDKA-TV until 1992 when he started at WKBN-TV production and news until 1999. Later he returned as manager for Beacon Broadcasting between 2000 and 2003.

The station's final incarnation under Beacon Broadcasting ownership was C-107.1, featuring an adult contemporary format. Before adopting the C-107.1 and the Christian rock formats of Freq 107 and Indie 107, the station was known as "Goodtime Oldies WEX-C 107" from 2001 to 2003. Prior to this oldies format, it broadcast Christian adult contemporary, and before Beacon Broadcasting's acquisition, it aired mainstream adult contemporary. WEXC was an affiliate of the Pittsburgh Pirates Baseball Network. The baseball broadcasts have since been moved to WLLF.

In 1998, WEXC and WGRP were sold to Youngstown-based Beacon Broadcasting. Beacon's principal owner, Harold Glunt was a steel supply company owner from the surrounding Warren, Ohio area. He purchased the stations to further Christian communications in the valley, concurrently, WEXC dropped the oldies format to assume a Christian rock format known as Freq 107 (which was later renamed Indie 107).

WEXC logo, during the "C-107.1" era.

Before the sale to EMF, WEXC changed formats to the "Today's Hits and Yesterday's Favorites" hot AC genre as C-107.1, boosting their listenership greatly.

"C-107.1" had been getting more involved in the community under the direction of G.M. Richard Esbenshade and air talent Gregg "Allen" Robison and John "The Madman" Madden. In addition to carrying syndicated talk hosts Glenn Beck and Jason Lewis, WEXC also started to air Donny Osmond's syndicated morning show. Most recently, the station was involved in one of several "Tea Parties" being held all across the country. C-107 also sponsored live concert events and giveaways for Kennywood and Waldameer & Water World amusement parks.

Harold Glunt died on January 22, 2010; his son subsequently put all of the Beacon stations up for sale. As of Friday, September 10, 2010, a sale of WEXC, WGRP and WLOA to Educational Media Foundation for $225,000 was announced, with an intent to spin off WGRP and WLOA to separate owners. The hot AC format was dropped to relay the "K-Love" Christian music network following the conclusion of a high school football game that evening. EMF received assignment of the licenses of WEXC, WLOA and WGRP from Beacon Broadcasting on December 23, 2010. On January 7, 2011, soon after the Federal Communications Commission approved the sale of the station to EMF, WLVX became the new call letters for the station. It changed to WEXC, followed by WLRF, in 2026.
