= WYLR =

- Hubbard, Ohio; United States
- Broadcast area: Youngstown; Warren, Ohio
- Frequency: 101.9 MHz

Programming
- Format: Contemporary Christian music
- Network: K-Love

Ownership
- Owner: Educational Media Foundation
- Sister stations: WLRF

History
- First air date: 1995
- Former call signs: WRBP (1992–1998); WBTJ (1998–2001); WRBP (2001–2013)
- Call sign meaning: Youngstown's (K) Love Radio

Technical information
- Licensing authority: FCC
- Facility ID: 63498
- Class: A
- ERP: 3,000 watts
- HAAT: 100 meters (330 ft)
- Transmitter coordinates: 41°5′29″N 80°30′5″W

Links
- Public license information: Public file; LMS
- Website: www.klove.com

WYLR is a radio station in the Youngstown, Ohio, market. Licensed to Hubbard, the station broadcasts a contemporary Christian music format on 101.9 FM from the Educational Media Foundation 24-hour national feed K-Love.

== History ==
The station signed on as a result of a construction permit issued on January 31, 1992, by Columbus atty. Percey Squire and local broadcaster Mr. Frankie 'Lucky" Halfacre who was the first African-American DJ in the greater Youngstown area who got his start on WNIO (1540 AM) in the 1960s.

From 1998 until 2001, the station was operated by Jacor Communications and successor Clear Channel Communications via a local marketing agreement (LMA), making it a part of their extensive Youngstown/New Castle cluster of stations. The call letters were WBTJ, and sported a rhythmic top 40 format as "101.9 The Beat". Then-owner Stop 26/Riverbend took Clear Channel to court, complaining to the Federal Communications Commission (FCC) that Clear Channel refused to preempt any of their programming upon Stop 26's request.

After settling in court, where Clear Channel paid a $25,000 fine to Stop 26 for unauthorized transfer of control of WBTJ, the "Beat" format was moved to the Sharpsville, Pennsylvania-licensed 95.9 facility (where it became "Kiss FM" WAKZ), and WNIO's adult standards programming was briefly simulcast until Stop 26 could re-assume control of the station. When that happened, the WRBP call letters, which were used prior to Jacor/Clear Channel's LMA, were revived.

Stop 26/Riverbend declared bankruptcy in 2006, and Bernard Radio purchased almost all of their stations, including WRBP, WASN and WGFT.

On June 13, 2012, it was announced that the Educational Media Foundation would acquire WRBP for $500,000. The last day for the urban format was December 31, 2012, at which time the station began to feature the contemporary Christian format of K-Love. As a result of the sale, the station became a non-commercial license. On January 24, 2013, the call letters were changed to WYLR.
