= WWIZ =

Radio station in West Middlesex, Pennsylvania

- West Middlesex, Pennsylvania; United States
- Broadcast area: Youngstown metropolitan area
- Frequency: 103.9 MHz
- Branding: Sports Radio Z-104

Programming
- Format: Sports radio
- Affiliations: Westwood One Sports

Ownership
- Owner: Cumulus Media; (Cumulus Licensing LLC)
- Sister stations: WBBW; WHOT-FM; WPIC; WQXK; WRQX; WYFM

History
- First air date: October 1972

Technical information
- Licensing authority: FCC
- Facility ID: 23437
- Class: A
- ERP: 6,000 watts
- HAAT: 88.9 meters (292 ft)
- Transmitter coordinates: 41.205°N 80.363°W

Links
- Public license information: Public file; LMS
- Webcast: Listen live
- Website: www.sportsradioz104.com

WWIZ (103.9 FM) is a commercial radio station licensed to West Middlesex, Pennsylvania, United States. Owned by Cumulus Media, the station carries a sports format as "Sports Radio Z-104". WWIZ serves the Mahoning Valley and portions of Western Pennsylvania. WWIZ's studios are located in Youngstown, while the transmitter resides off of Greenfield Road in Hermitage, Pennsylvania.

== History ==
WWIZ first signed on the air in October 1972, playing album rock. The station carried an active rock format for several decades, branded as "Rock 104".

On March 31, 2017, WWIZ dropped its active rock format and began stunting. It played a continuous loop of The Moody Blues' “Nights in White Satin” and The Royal Guardsmen's “Snoopy vs. the Red Baron”, with just a station identification between the songs. The following day at noon, the station flipped to oldies as "Z104" using Westwood One's "Good Time Oldies" satellite feed.

On April 17, 2025, WWIZ changed its format from oldies to adult contemporary music (AC), still under the "Z104" branding. It switched to the Westwood One Hits & Favorites network. This left the Youngstown market without a full-time classic hits or oldies station. WWIZ had been effectively forced to change formats because of Westwood One's plan to shut down the "Good Time Oldies" network that month.

=== Christmas music ===
Between 2019 and 2022, WWIZ temporarily displaced its oldies format in favor of Christmas music during the holiday season and became known as "Christmas 104".

The change first occurred on October 25, 2019, when WWIZ dropped its oldies format and began carrying Christmas music. It was the first U.S. station that year to flip to Christmas music for the holiday season and initially appeared to be a stunt. However, on January 1, 2020, WWIZ ended the Christmas music and returned to the "Z104" oldies format.

On September 25, 2020, at 12:25 p.m., WWIZ again flipped to Christmas music. It made this unusually early change due to the stress of the COVID-19 pandemic. It is the earliest known flip to Christmas music for an FCC-licensed station; the earliest stations, including stunting stations, typically flip to the format in mid-October.

On October 1, 2021, at 12:25 p.m., WWIZ again flipped to Christmas music, branded as "Christmas 104". This year, it was not the first station to change, as WXMS in Au Sable, New York, made the flip a few hours earlier.

In 2022, WWIZ opted not to repeat the excessively early flips of the previous years; it did not switch to "Christmas 104" until November 1, 2022, at 12:25 p.m. It continued the format through New Year's Day.

In 2023 and 2024, WWIZ decided not to run an all-Christmas music format. Starting in late November, the station mixed in a few Christmas songs into its regular oldies format and retained the "Z 104" branding.

On November 1, 2025, WWIZ opted to bring back the all-Christmas format after a two-year break, again using the "Christmas 104" branding.

=== Flip to sports ===
In late July 2026, Cumulus announced that the programming of WLLF, WWIZ's sister station that carried a sports radio format, would be moved to WWIZ, as Cumulus prepared to sell the WLLF license to Family Life Network.
