= WCGK =

Radio station in Mercer, Pennsylvania, serving Youngstown, Ohio

- Mercer, Pennsylvania; United States
- Broadcast area: Mercer County; Youngstown metropolitan area (limited)
- Frequency: 96.7 MHz

Programming
- Format: Christian contemporary music
- Network: Family Life Network

Ownership
- Owner: Family Life Ministries

History
- First air date: January 1986
- Former call signs: WKTX (1984–1990); WKTX-FM (1990–1991); WLLF (1991–2026)
- Call sign meaning: Where Christ Gives Kindness

Technical information
- Licensing authority: FCC
- Facility ID: 6653
- Class: A
- ERP: 1,400 watts
- HAAT: 148 meters (486 ft)
- Transmitter coordinates: 41°18′43.2″N 80°16′38.2″W

Links
- Public license information: Public file; LMS

WLLF (96.7 FM) is a radio station licensed to Mercer, Pennsylvania, United States. The station airs a Christian contemporary format and is owned by the Family Life Network. WLLF's transmitter is located off of Delaware Road in Delaware Township.

== History ==
The station was first issued a construction permit in March 1984. It signed on in January 1985 as WKTX. It was purchased in August 1990 by Mercer County Broadcasting, headed by Patrick Engrao. For a time, this station was co-owned with WKTX in Cortland, Ohio.

The WLLF call letters originated in 1991, when the station simulcast Youngstown rock station WNCD "The Wolf", then at 106.1 MHz. The call letters remained until 2026, including when it was a smooth jazz outlet.

In April 2010, Cumulus Media ended the station's long run as "96.7 The River", a satellite-fed adult contemporary format and launched a new sports format featuring ESPN Radio with the Pittsburgh Pirates and Pittsburgh Penguins radio networks. The station also carried a local sports show originating at sister station WPIC in Sharon, Pennsylvania. WLLF also carried a variety of local high school and college sports. On January 2, 2013, WLLF switched its network to CBS Sports Radio.

On June 30, 2026, Cumulus Media announced that it would sell WLLF and WWKL in Hershey/Harrisburg, Pennsylvania, to Family Life Ministries for $2.25 million, with the buyers planning to flip the station's format to their in-house Christian AC-formatted Family Life Network. WLLF's format moved to sister station WWIZ, which had been running satellite-driven music formats since 2017; WLLF was chosen as the license to spin off because of WWIZ's stronger signal into Ohio, which is not in Family Life's territory. The call sign changed to WCGK (for Where Christ Gives Kindness, in line with Family Life's call sign formula) on September 18, 2026.
