= WBBW =

Sports radio station in Youngstown, Ohio

- Youngstown, Ohio; United States
- Broadcast area: Youngstown, Ohio; Sharon, Pennsylvania; Warren, Ohio
- Frequency: 1240 kHz
- Branding: Sportsradio 1240

Programming
- Format: Sports
- Affiliations: Westwood One Sports

Ownership
- Owner: Cumulus Media; (Cumulus Licensing LLC)
- Sister stations: WHOT-FM; WPIC; WQXK; WRQX; WWIZ; WYFM

History
- First air date: February 20, 1949

Technical information
- Licensing authority: FCC
- Facility ID: 13667
- Class: C
- Power: 1,000 watts (unlimited)
- Transmitter coordinates: 41°4′50″N 80°38′54″W

Links
- Public license information: Public file; LMS
- Webcast: Listen live
- Website: wbbw.com

WBBW (1240 AM) is a commercial radio station in Youngstown, Ohio, broadcasting a sports format. The station carries Westwood One Sports, much of it simulcast with co-owned WWIZ.

WBBW is one of seven radio stations in the Youngstown market owned by Cumulus Media. The studios and offices are in "The Radio Center" in Youngstown. Prior to January 2, 2013, WBBW featured programming from ESPN Radio.

WBBW carries the Mahoning Valley Scrappers in the collegiate summer baseball league. WBBW and WWIZ are also the Youngstown affiliates of the Pittsburgh Pirates.

WBBW has been on the air since February 20, 1949.
