= WYFX-LD =

Television station in Youngstown, Ohio

- Youngstown, Ohio; United States
- Channels: Digital: 32 (UHF); Virtual: 62
- Branding: Fox Youngstown

Programming
- Affiliations: 62.1: Fox; 62.2: Independent with MyNetworkTV; for others, see § Subchannels

Ownership
- Owner: Nexstar Media Group; (Nexstar Media Inc.)
- Sister stations: WKBN-TV, WYTV

History
- Founded: April 14, 1989
- First air date: September 6, 1998
- Former call signs: W62BT (1989–2000); WYFX-LP (2000–2011)
- Former channel numbers: Analog: 62 (UHF, 1998–2011); Digital: 19 (UHF, 2010–2019); Translators: 17 WFXI-CA Mercer, PA; 31 W31BW (using fictional call letters WLFX) Masury, OH
- Call sign meaning: "Youngstown's Fox"

Technical information
- Licensing authority: FCC
- Facility ID: 68398
- Class: LD
- ERP: 15 kW
- HAAT: 389.4 m (1,278 ft)
- Transmitter coordinates: 41°3′23.4″N 80°38′43″W
- Translator(s): WKBN-TV 27.2 Youngstown

Links
- Public license information: LMS
- Website: www.wkbn.com

WYFX-LD (channel 62) is a low-power television station in Youngstown, Ohio, United States, affiliated with the Fox network. It is owned by Nexstar Media Group alongside CBS affiliate WKBN-TV (channel 27); Nexstar also provides certain services to ABC affiliate WYTV (channel 33) through joint sales and shared services agreements (JSA/SSA) with Vaughan Media, LLC. The three stations share studios on Sunset Boulevard in Youngstown's Pleasant Grove neighborhood, where WYFX-LD's transmitter is also located.

Even though WYFX broadcasts a digital signal of its own, its low-power broadcasting radius only covers the immediate Youngstown area. Therefore, it is simulcast in high definition on WKBN-TV's second digital subchannel (27.2) in order to reach the entire market.

== History ==
WYFX-LP, along with repeater W31BW (channel 31) in Masury, Ohio, were launched on September 6, 1998, as the area's first full-time Fox affiliates. Previously, WYTV showed some Fox Sports events from 1994 until 1998, while Fox's prime time programming was seen on cable via WPGH-TV in Pittsburgh, or from the network's Cleveland affiliates, first WOIO, then from WJW-TV after WOIO switched to CBS. On June 22, 2000, W31BW's call letters were changed to WFXI-LP. (WFXI-LP shared its call letters with the Fox affiliate in Morehead City, North Carolina; both stations were owned by Piedmont Television until 2007, but were otherwise unrelated.) With digital television in its infancy at the time, WYFX and WFXI were started with their own signals as opposed to future stations WFMJ-DT2 and WYTV-DT2, which were both launched on new second digital subchannels of WFMJ-TV and WYTV respectively. This resulted in WYFX and WFXI having their own licenses with the Federal Communications Commission (FCC). Because of duopoly rules at the time, which would be partially repealed only two years later, both stations were launched as low-power stations (though WFXI converted to a class A license on channel 17, licensed to Mercer, Pennsylvania, in 2002).

The two were originally branded "Fox 40/62", followed by "Fox 31/62" and finally "Fox 17/62" for most of their first ten years. In 2008, the stations started slowly re-branding themselves as "Fox Youngstown" in some advertisements, despite still using the "Fox 17/62" logo. This was done because the on-air branding of "Fox 17/62" would be rendered useless once they would be forced to sign off their analog signals in 2012. Low-power and class A analog signals have a later deadline for sign-off than the June 12, 2009, sign-off for full-powered analog signals like WKBN. Additionally, WYFX and WFXI are carried on different channel positions on cable.

A new logo was introduced for the start of the 2008–2009 fall season, similar to the old logo except that the "17/62" designation, as well as the WYFX calls, are removed. Some advertisements still used the "Fox 17/62" branding for some time afterward, but as of October 2008, the stations had all but fully renamed themselves as "Fox Youngstown". A completely redesigned logo would debut in February 2009, matching WKBN's then-newly redesigned logo, and by that point, all references to the stations' channel numbers had disappeared.

On February 8, 2009, WKBN did a "dual HD" test airing both college basketball on 41.1 and the Gatorade Duel (the qualifying race for the Daytona 500) on 41.2 in a possible attempt to broadcast both signals in high definition full-time. Previously, WKBN-DT2 was aired in standard definition with special sporting events (such as additional games from the NCAA Division I men's basketball tournament) using 41.3 in HD. WKBN had to compress both signals to the 720p format in order to make it possible. That station began broadcasting both channels in high definition full-time the next day making WKBN the eighth station nationally to broadcast two subchannels in high definition on the same signal. This continued until October 4, 2011, when New Vision moved the WYFX-HD transmission to the WYFX-LD antenna.

WFXI-CA was closed down on October 1, 2009, with the license being returned to the FCC the next day. However, current television listings continue to display WFXI-CA. Although WYFX would not normally qualify for must-carry due to being a low-power station, it is carried on all Mahoning Valley cable systems as part of the compensation for carrying WKBN. It is noticeably absent from Comcast systems in New Castle, Pennsylvania, which, despite being considerably closer to Youngstown, is part of the Pittsburgh market.

On May 7, 2012, LIN TV Corporation announced that it would acquire the New Vision Television station group for $330.4 million and the assumption of $12 million in debt. Along with the outright ownership of WYFX-LD and sister station WKBN-TV, the agreement included the acquisition of New Vision's shared services agreement with PBC Broadcasting (whose station licenses would be transferred to Vaughan Media as part of the deal), giving LIN operational control of WYTV. LIN and Vaughan also entered into a joint sales agreement for WYTV. On October 2, the FCC approved the proposed sale to LIN TV. The transaction was completed on October 12, 2012.

On March 21, 2014, Media General announced that it would purchase LIN Media and its stations, including WKBN-TV, WYFX-LD, and the SSA and JSA with WYTV, in a $1.6 billion merger. The FCC approved the deal on December 12, 2014, but a condition of the deal requires Media General to end the JSA between WKBN-TV and WYTV within two years due to tighter regulations on such deals; Media General is not required to divest itself of WYFX-LD, since low-powered stations do not count against FCC ownership limits. The merger was completed on December 19.

In September 2015, Texas-based Nexstar Broadcasting Group announced it would acquire Media General and all of its stations, including WYFX, for $4.6 billion. The FCC approved the merger on January 11, 2016, and the sale was finalized on January 18, 2016.

On December 31, 2015, WYFX activated 19.3, which became the Youngstown affiliate for Laff. WYFX then activated 19.2 for GetTV on February 1, 2016. On April 23, 2018, WYFX activated three more digital subchannels as part of WKBN-TV and WYTV sharing spectrum following Nexstar selling WKBN-TV's spectrum as part of the FCC's spectrum reallocation program. In order to make room for WKBN-TV, Ion Television (previously on 27.3) moved to WYFX 19.3 while Bounce TV (previously on 33.3) moved to WYFX 19.4; Laff subsequently moved to 19.5 and GetTV to 19.6, while 19.2 became a high-definition simulcast of MyYTV (to provide the immediate Youngstown area with over-the-air 720p HD access to MyNetworkTV programming). As WYTV-DT2 is currently airing in standard definition, and its high-definition simulcast is on a low-power station, MyNetworkTV programming in HD is only available on cable and satellite outside the immediate Youngstown area.

== Newscasts ==
On January 23, 2006, WYFX's First News at 10 on Fox 17/62 (produced by WKBN) became the area's only hour-long prime time broadcast on weeknights while remaining thirty minutes on weekends. After a rebranding occurred in 2008, the title changed to First News on Fox. For a period, WYFX's show competed with another newscast seen at the same time on MyNetwork affiliate WYTV-DT2 that was produced by its parent ABC station.

There is also a two-hour weekday morning show seen on WYFX while WKBN broadcasts CBS Mornings. Known as First News This Morning on Fox, the program is essentially an extension of the CBS affiliate's show offering a local alternative. On May 6, 2010, WKBN and WYTV upgraded their combined news operation to high definition. Local news seen on Fox affiliate WYFX was also included in the change.

WYFX (through sister station WKBN-TV) has a news and weather sharing partnership with Youngstown's iHeart Media radio cluster, which includes WKBN (570 AM), WNIO (1390 AM), WNCD (93.3 FM), WAKZ (95.9 FM), WMXY (98.9 FM), and WBBG (106.1 FM).

== Subchannels ==
The station's signal is multiplexed:

Subchannels of WYFX-LD
Channel	Res.	Short name	Programming
62.1	720p	WYFX-HD	Fox
62.2	720p	MyYTV-H	WYTV-DT2 in HD (Independent with MyNetworkTV)
62.3	480i	ION	Ion (4:3)
62.4	480i	Bounce	Bounce TV (4:3)
62.5	480i	LAFF	Laff (4:3)
62.6	480i	ATV	Antenna TV (4:3)

Simulcast of subchannels of another station
