= Sharpsville, Pennsylvania =

Borough in Pennsylvania, US

- Borough
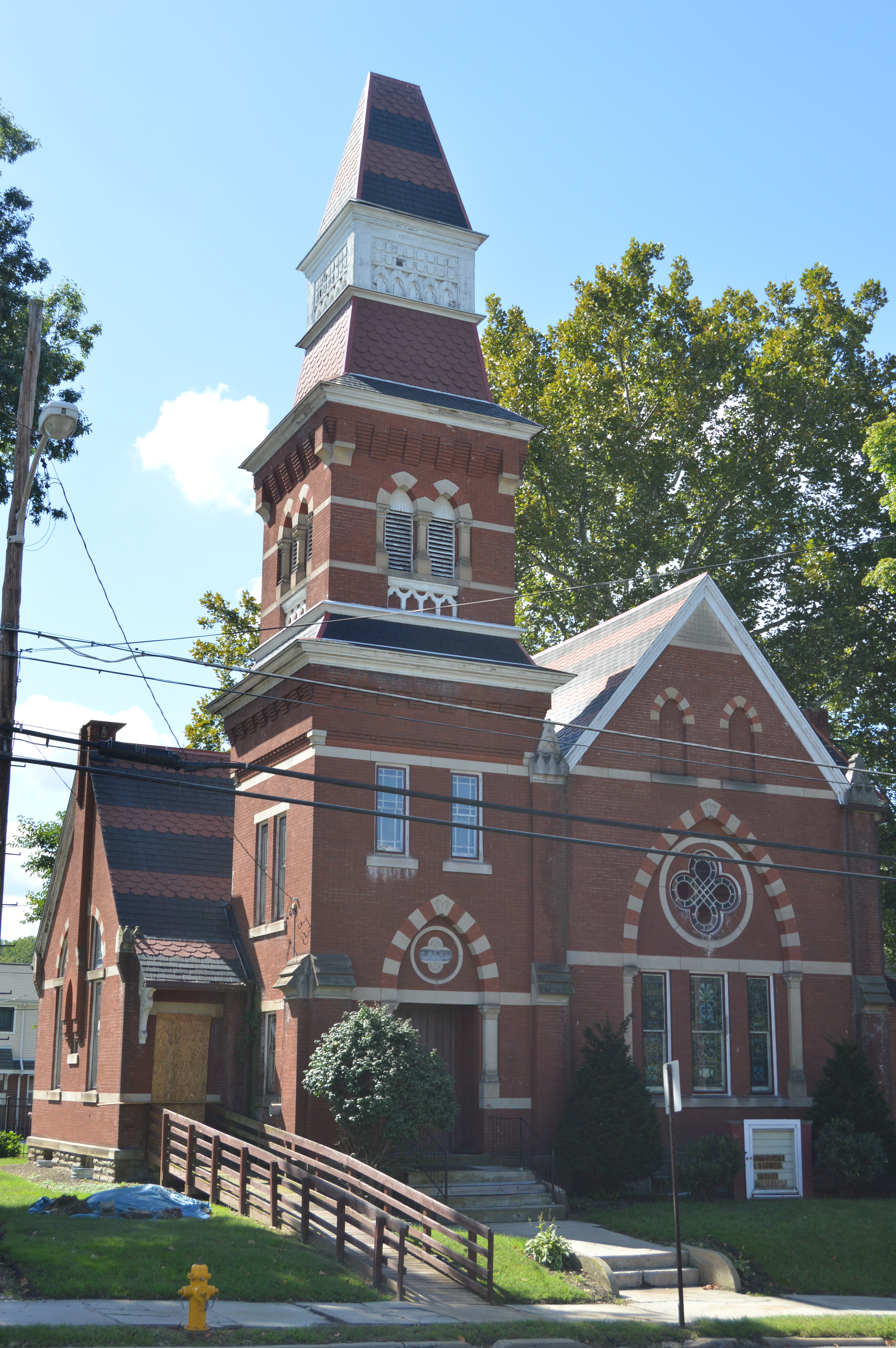
- First Universalist Church, a historic site in the borough

- Location of Sharpsville in Mercer County, Pennsylvania.

- Location of Sharpsville within Pennsylvania
- Coordinates: 41°15′32″N 80°28′54″W
- Country: United States
- State: Pennsylvania
- County: Mercer
- Established: 1874

Government
  - Mayor: Mark Gill

Area
  - Total: 1.40 sq mi (3.63 km^{2})
  - Land: 1.39 sq mi (3.60 km^{2})
  - Water: 0.012 sq mi (0.03 km^{2})
- Elevation (center of borough): 1,000 ft (300 m)
- Highest elevation (southeast corner of borough): 1,140 ft (350 m)
- Lowest elevation (Shenango River): 870 ft (270 m)

Population (2020)
  - Total: 4,255
  - Density: 3,058.9/sq mi (1,181.06/km^{2})
- Time zone: UTC-4 (EST)
  - Summer (DST): UTC-5 (EDT)
- Zip code: 16150
- Area code: 724
- FIPS code: 42-69800
- Website: www.sharpsville.org

Sharpsville is a borough that is located in western Mercer County, Pennsylvania, United States, along the Shenango River. The population was 4,253 as of the 2020 census. It is part of the Hermitage micropolitan area.

== History ==
The First Universalist Church of Sharpsville and Jonas J. Pierce House are listed on the National Register of Historic Places.

In 2004 local politicians proposed the creation of Shenango Valley City, consisting of Sharpsville as well as Hermitage, Sharon, Farrell, and Wheatland with the issue being put on the ballot in the form of a referendum. Then Governor of Pennsylvania, Ed Rendell voiced support for the measure and would be joined by Kathleen McGinty, Secretary of the Department of Environmental Protection, and Dennis Yablonsky, Secretary of the Department of Community and Economic Development with the trio touring the region to urge for voters to pass the motion. The city would largely be an expansion of Hermitage, whose city government would be retained including the office of mayor and its nine-member city council. The merger would have kept the various independent school districts intact. The effort would ultimately be defeated, and via the ordinance the issue of merger could not be brought up again until 2009.

== Geography ==
Sharpsville is located at 41°15′32″N 80°28′54″W (41.259005, -80.481791).

According to the United States Census Bureau, the borough has a total area of 1.4 square miles (3.6 km^{2}), of which 1.4 square miles (3.6 km^{2}) is land and 0.04 square miles (0.10 km^{2}) (1.42%) is water.

== Demographics ==
Historical population
Census	Pop.	Note	%±
1880	1,824		—
1890	2,330		27.7%
1900	2,970		27.5%
1910	3,634		22.4%
1920	4,674		28.6%
1930	5,194		11.1%
1940	5,129		−1.3%
1950	5,414		5.6%
1960	6,061		12.0%
1970	6,126		1.1%
1980	5,375		−12.3%
1990	4,729		−12.0%
2000	4,500		−4.8%
2010	4,415		−1.9%
2020	4,255		−3.6%
2021 (est.)	4,218	▼	−0.9%
U.S. Decennial Census

=== 2020 census ===
As of the 2020 census, Sharpsville had a population of 4,255. The median age was 43.3 years. 21.0% of residents were under the age of 18 and 21.3% of residents were 65 years of age or older. For every 100 females there were 93.6 males, and for every 100 females age 18 and over there were 88.2 males age 18 and over.

100.0% of residents lived in urban areas, while 0.0% lived in rural areas.

There were 1,880 households in Sharpsville, of which 27.7% had children under the age of 18 living in them. Of all households, 39.6% were married-couple households, 19.5% were households with a male householder and no spouse or partner present, and 33.9% were households with a female householder and no spouse or partner present. About 32.9% of all households were made up of individuals and 15.3% had someone living alone who was 65 years of age or older.

There were 2,050 housing units, of which 8.3% were vacant. The homeowner vacancy rate was 2.3% and the rental vacancy rate was 8.1%.

Racial composition as of the 2020 census
Race	Number	Percent
White	3,893	91.5%
Black or African American	81	1.9%
American Indian and Alaska Native	7	0.2%
Asian	19	0.4%
Native Hawaiian and Other Pacific Islander	1	0.0%
Some other race	29	0.7%
Two or more races	225	5.3%
Hispanic or Latino (of any race)	71	1.7%

=== Demographic estimates ===
As of 2022, there were 3,930 people, 1,971 households, and 804 families residing in the borough.

The population density was 2,825 inhabitants per square mile (1,091/km^{2}). There were 2,016 housing units at an average density of 1,453.4 per square mile (561.2/km^{2}).

The racial makeup of the borough was 97.53% White, 1.22% African American, 0.91% Asian, and 0.34% from two or more races. Hispanic or Latino of any race were 0.6% of the population.

Of households, 40.8% were married couples living together; 14.9% had a female householder with no husband present, 4% had a male householder with no wife present, and 40.4% were non-families. The average household size was 2.11 and the average family size was 2.77.

Within the borough, the population was spread out, with 28.9% of residents who were under the age of 20, 24.8% from 21 to 40, 29.6% from 41 to 60, and 16.9% from 60 to 80+. The median age was 44.5 years, for males it is 42.5, and females 47.2. The sex ratio is 2,269 female at 54.4%, and male at 1,899 at 45.6%.

The median income for a household in the borough was $46,523, and the median income for a family was $65,000. Males had a median income of $41,900 compared with that of $31,439 for females.

The per capita income for the borough was $29,830.

Approximately 12.6% of the population were living below the poverty line, including 25% of those who were under the age of eighteen and 4% of those who were aged sixty-five or older.

== Broadcast media ==
=== Television ===
Because of Sharpsville's location near the Pennsylvania/Ohio border, it is served by WKBN-TV (CBS), WFMJ-TV (NBC), WYTV (ABC), WYFX-LD (Fox) and WBCB (CW), all broadcast from nearby Youngstown, OH.

=== Radio ===
Sharpsville is served by AM radio stations such as WPIC (790 AM) from Sharon and WKBN (570 AM) from Youngstown and FM radio stations such as WYFM/"Y-103" (102.9 FM) from Sharon, WAKZ/"KISS FM" (95.9 FM) from Sharpsville, WYLE/"Willie 95.1" (95.1 FM) from Grove City, and WMXY/"Mix 98.9" (98.9 FM) from Youngstown.

== Notable people ==
- Carmen Argenziano – actor
- Marvin Pierce – president of American magazine publisher McCall Corporation, and father of United States First Lady Barbara Pierce Bush
- Brian L. Stafford – 20th Director of the United States Secret Service
- Harry Wilson — college football player

== See also ==
- Buhl Farm Golf Course
