= WKBN =

WKBN may refer to:

- WKBN (AM), a radio station (570 AM) licensed to Youngstown, Ohio, United States
- WKBN-TV, a television station (channel 27) licensed to Youngstown, Ohio, United States
- WMXY, a radio station (98.9 FM) licensed to Youngstown, Ohio, United States, which formerly used the call sign WKBN-FM
