= WKBN-TV =

Television station in Youngstown, Ohio

- Youngstown, Ohio; United States
- Channels: Digital: 31 (UHF), shared with WYTV; Virtual: 27
- Branding: WKBN 27; WKBN 27 First News

Programming
- Affiliations: 27.1: CBS; 27.2: Fox

Ownership
- Owner: Nexstar Media Group; (Nexstar Media Inc.)
- Sister stations: WYFX-LD, WYTV

History
- First air date: January 11, 1953
- Former channel numbers: Analog: 27 (UHF, 1953–2009); Digital: 41 (UHF, 2006–2018), 36 (UHF, 2018–2019)
- Former affiliations: Both secondary: ABC (January−April 1953); DuMont (1953–1956)
- Call sign meaning: derived from former sister station WKBN radio

Technical information
- Licensing authority: FCC
- Facility ID: 73153
- ERP: 703 kW
- HAAT: 437.1 m (1,434 ft)
- Transmitter coordinates: 41°3′23.4″N 80°38′43″W

Links
- Public license information: Public file; LMS
- Website: www.wkbn.com

WKBN-TV (channel 27) is a television station in Youngstown, Ohio, United States, affiliated with CBS. It is owned by Nexstar Media Group alongside low-power Fox affiliate WYFX-LD (channel 62); Nexstar also provides certain services to ABC affiliate WYTV (channel 33) through joint sales and shared services agreements (JSA/SSA) with Vaughan Media, LLC. The three stations share studios on Sunset Boulevard in Youngstown's Pleasant Grove neighborhood, where WKBN-TV's transmitter is also located.

== History ==
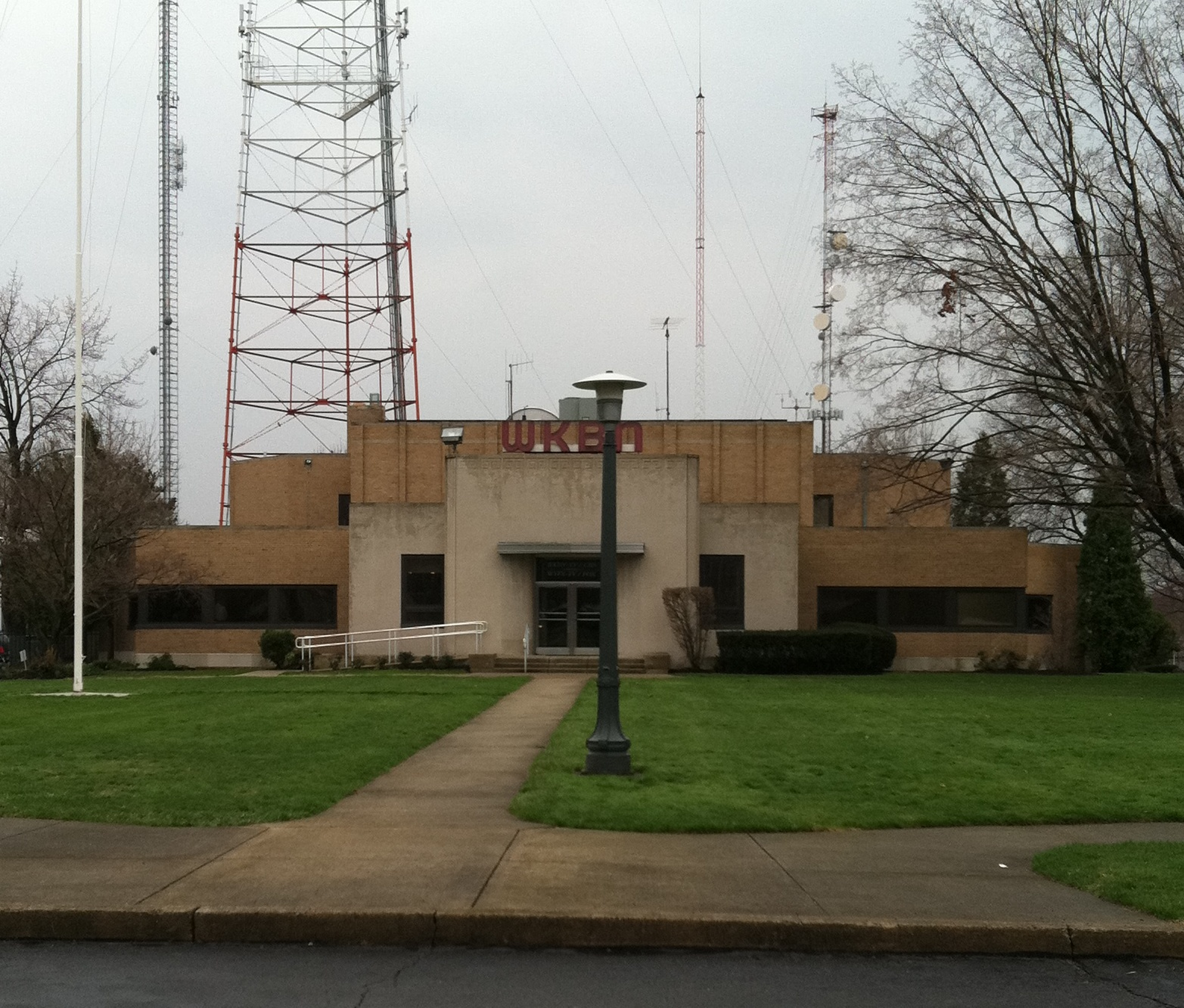
WKBN-TV transmitter, office and studio building, located at 3930 Sunset Boulevard, about five miles south of downtown Youngstown. This is also the main base of operations for sister Fox affiliate WYFX-LD, and ABC affiliate WYTV; the latter of which is operated under a shared-services agreement with WKBN-TV.

The station went on-the-air January 11, 1953, as the first UHF station in Ohio and the sixth in the nation. It was owned by the Williamson family along with WKBN radio (AM 570 and FM 98.9, now WMXY) as part of the WKBN Broadcasting Corporation. The radio station was a CBS Radio affiliate, and the television station has remained a primary CBS affiliate. It also had secondary affiliations with ABC and DuMont. Shortly afterward, WKST-TV in nearby New Castle, Pennsylvania (now WYTV), signed-on and took the ABC affiliation. With DuMont off-the-air three years later, WKBN was solely affiliated with CBS by the end of 1956.

The Telecommunications Act of 1996, which deregulated television station ownership, affected WKBN-TV heavily, as it has had an unusual number of owners for a full-power American television station since then, having seen its ownership change six times.

In 1997, the Williamsons sold the station to Gocom, which later became Piedmont Television. Although most of the Williamsons have moved away from Youngstown, the family still makes major donations to the area. Most notably, Youngstown State University's Williamson College of Business Administration, which is housed in Williamson Hall, is named in their honor. The Williamsons held onto WKBN-AM-FM until 1999. However, WKBN-TV does retain a news and weather sharing partnership with iHeartMedia, the current owners of its former radio sisters.

On April 19, 2006, WKBN began airing its digital signal on UHF channel 41. The digital broadcast features CBS programming in high definition (when available) and also carries a simulcast of low-powered sister station WYFX-LP. On November 15, Piedmont Television announced the sale of WKBN and WYFX to New Vision Television based in Atlanta. The sale closed in early March 2007. Shortly afterward, WKBN began operating longtime rival WYTV in a shared services agreement.

On February 8, 2009, the station did a "dual HD" test airing both college basketball on its main digital signal and the Gatorade Duel (the qualifying race for the Daytona 500) on 27.2 (which simulcasts WYFX) in a possible attempt to broadcast both signals in high definition full-time. WKBN had to compress both signals to the 720p format in order to make it possible. It began broadcasting both channels in high definition full-time the next day making WKBN the eighth station nationally to broadcast two subchannels on the same signal in high definition. This continued until October 4, 2011, when New Vision moved the WYFX-HD transmission to the WYFX-LD antenna.

WKBN's powerful signal provides viewers in the eastern half of the Cleveland DMA an alternative to WJW (Fox) and WOIO (CBS) which broadcast on channels 8 and 10, respectively. VHF has proven to be a problem with digital television and frustrated viewers have had better luck picking up WKBN's UHF signal than with WJW and WOIO's VHF signals.

On May 7, 2012, LIN TV Corporation announced that it would acquire the New Vision Television station group for $330.4 million and the assumption of $12 million in debt. Along with the outright ownership of WKBN-TV and WYFX-LD, the agreement includes the acquisition of New Vision's shared services agreement with Parkin Broadcasting, giving LIN operational control of WYTV. LIN and Vaughan also entered into a joint sales agreement between WKBN and WYTV. On October 2, the FCC approved the proposed sale to LIN TV. The transaction was closed on October 12, 2012.

On November 15, 2012, the master control operators at WKBN were notified that the day-to-day master control operations at Sunset Boulevard would be handled by a hub at the studios of sister station WWLP in Chicopee, Massachusetts. The master control hubbing was completed on June 29, 2013, at 4 a.m. All syndicated and network content on WKBN, WYFX, WYTV and MyYTV now flows via fiber optic from the hub facility at WWLP; local newscasts still originate from the Sunset Boulevard studios in Youngstown.

WKBN News Logo

On March 21, 2014, Media General announced that it would purchase LIN Media and its stations, including WKBN-TV, WYFX-LD, and the SSA and JSA with WYTV, in a $1.6 billion merger. The FCC approved the deal on December 12, 2014, but a condition of the deal requires Media General to end the JSA between WKBN-TV and WYTV within two years due to tighter regulations on such deals. The merger was completed on December 19. Despite the conditions, WKBN-TV continues to operate WYTV, including after Nexstar acquired Media General in early 2017.

On February 12, 2015, WKBN-TV launched a high-tech news set. The set utilizes Virtual and Augmented Reality elements, computer-generated designs that are layered on real scenic elements. WKBN is one of the only local broadcast stations in the entire country to utilize this technology.

In 2017, WKBN-TV sold its spectrum for $34 million as part of the FCC's spectrum reallocation program and moved its broadcasting to sister station WYTV's frequency. WKBN-TV moved to WYTV's frequency on April 23, 2018. In order to make room for WKBN-TV, Ion Television moved from 27.3 to WYFX's 19.3 while Bounce TV moved from 33.3 to WYFX 19.4.

== Programming ==
WKBN-TV is the longtime home of Mr. Food segments in its newscasts, which became "Mr. Food's Test Kitchen" after Art Ginsburg's death in 2012; Ginsburg would occasionally appear at the station in-person as Mr. Food whenever he would do promotional work in the Mahoning Valley.

=== News operation ===
WKBN presently broadcasts 31 hours of locally produced newscasts each week (with 5 1/2 hours each weekday, two hours on Saturdays and 1 1/2 hours on Sundays).

WKBN established a weekday morning program in 1992. On January 23, 2006, WYFX's First News at 10 on Fox 17/62 (produced by WKBN) became the area's only hour-long prime time broadcast on weeknights while remaining thirty minutes on weekends.

After a rebranding occurred in 2008, the title changed to First News on Fox. For a period, WYFX's broadcast competed with another newscast seen at the same time on MyNetwork affiliate WYTV-DT2 that was produced by its parent ABC station. There is also a two-hour weekday morning show seen on WYFX while WKBN broadcasts CBS Mornings. Known as First News This Morning on Fox, the show is essentially an extension of the CBS affiliate's show offering a local alternative.

In December 2007, the news departments of WKBN and WYTV physically merged. As a result, over forty personnel at WYTV and six at WKBN were laid-off. Under the shared services agreement, this station began producing newscasts on the ABC affiliate from a secondary set at the Sunset Boulevard studios. A previous plan calling for WYTV to build satellite streetside studios in Downtown Youngstown were abandoned due to the consolidation. The current operational status of its Doppler weather radar based at the old facility on Shady Run Road is unknown. The two stations gradually had their on-air looks mirror each other while their respective web sites became identical. New logos for the stations and updated websites debuted in January 2009 including combined operations for sports and weather.

An updated graphic and music theme, created by John Christopher Burns Design, premiered on February 24, 2009, replacing graphics dating back to 1997. The "WKBN" lettering style in its new logo was inspired from the WKBN sign at its historical facility. To differentiate the CBS and ABC affiliates from each other and maintain a separate identity, the stations adopted individual graphic and music packages. Due to the duopoly, WKBN and WYTV maintain separate primary anchors for news, weather, and sports during the week but share most general assignment reporters and video footage. The two initially maintained separate web sites as well, however after LIN Media took over ownership of WKBN-WYFX and operations of WYTV, WYTV's website became a redirect to WKBN's website with only WYTV's station identification information available on WKBN's web site. Recently, WYTV has its own website once again.

On May 6, 2010, the two outlets upgraded their combined news operation to high definition complete with new graphics on WYTV. Local news seen on Fox affiliate WYFX was also included in the change. There are news and weather sharing partnerships with WKBN (570 AM), WNIO (1390 AM), WNCD (93.3 FM), WAKZ (95.9 FM), WMXY (98.9 FM), and WBBG (106.1 FM).

== Subchannels ==
Subchannels of WYTV and WKBN-TV
License	Channel	Res.	Short name	Programming
WYTV	33.1	720p	WYTV-HD	ABC
WYTV	33.2	480i	MyYTV	Independent with MyNetworkTV
WKBN-TV	27.1	1080i	WKBN-HD	CBS
WKBN-TV	27.2	720p	WYFX-HD	Fox (WYFX-LD)

Simulcast of subchannels of another station
