= Academic Challenge =

Academic Challenge may refer to:

- Academic Challenge (Ohio), a high school quiz program throughout Ohio
- YSU Academic Challenge, a high school and middle school quiz show
- Commissioner's Academic Challenge, a Florida public high school competition

== See also ==
- Academic Games
