= National Council of Women Voters =

American suffrage organization (1911–1920)

The National Council of Women Voters, founded in 1911, was a nonpartisan organization intended to educate women voters and support the suffrage movement. The council was founded by Emma Smith DeVoe. At the 1909 conference of the National American Women's Suffrage Association (NAWSA), DeVoe proposed the formation of a national organization for women in states where they had voting rights. She envisioned this being an organization not only to advocate for women who could vote at the state level, but to eventually succeed NAWSA once suffrage was settled law. The motion was voted down, so DeVoe formed her own coalition. In 1919, a national convention of NCWV and NAWSA voted to merge the two organizations. The merger was made official in early 1920, resulting in the formation of the League of Women Voters.

== Formation ==
DeVoe envisioned an organization that would educate newly-enfranchised women, lobby for legislation in their interest, and advocate for the expansion of voting rights to all women. Some women in western states, such as her home state of Washington, had grown frustrated with NAWSA. The organization had mounted a series of failed campaigns in the decades prior, leading DeVoe and other critics to question their methods.

At the 1909 NAWSA convention, DeVoe proposed her vision for a coalition of enfranchised women, but was voted down. In 1911, shortly after Washington became the fifth state to extend the vote to women (two previously passed suffrage bills in Washington had been overturned by the Territorial Supreme Court), DeVoe established NCWV. She requested a meeting with Governor James Brady of Idaho to outline her plans and request his support. Gov. Brady was happy to do so, and called upon the governors of the other four enfranchised states – Utah, Colorado, Washington, and Wyoming – to appoint a woman to represent their state on the Council.

The Council had their first meeting just three days later, on January 14, 1911. The delegates, Margaret S. Roberts (ID), Zell Hart Deming (WY), Mary C. C. Bradford (CO), Susan Young Gates (UT), and Virginia Wilson Mason (WA), officially created the NCWV, wrote its constitution, and elected officers. DeVoe was elected president, drawing ire and suspicion from her critics in NAWSA who believed that she had rigged the election in a bid to gain power – a claim which DeVoe denied.

== Collaboration with the Congressional Union ==
NCWV's support for a constitutional amendment establishing women's suffrage led the organization to align itself with the Congressional Union for Women's Suffrage, who had also split off from NAWSA due to ideological differences. The Union's tactics differed starkly from NCWV's; led by Alice Paul, the organization was the most militant of the prominent suffragist organizations. The Union sought to bring attention to the issue through high-profile protests, including picketing the White House, organizing against Democratic candidates who weren't sufficiently supportive of suffrage, and conducting hunger strikes in prison.

Collaborating with NCWV allowed the Congressional Union to somewhat soften its image. DeVoe had developed a reputation for her mild manners and ladylike tactics that undercut some of the criticism of suffragists. However, as Paul's tactics continued to grow more extreme, the tenuous alliance crumbled.

== Reconciliation with NAWSA ==
After years of tension, the 1915 resignation of NAWSA president Anna Howard Shaw and her replacement by Carrie Chapman Catt opened the door for NAWSA and NCVW to collaborate. Catt and DeVoe were both pragmatists who emphasized the importance of reason and ladylike decorum to counter negative perceptions of suffragists and garner support for their cause. The two shared concerns about the increasingly militant methods of Alice Paul, president of the Congressional Union for Women's Suffrage. Catt and DeVoe hoped that by strengthening ties between the organizations, they could present a united front that would grow the movement and minimize any reputational damage done by Paul. The ties between the two organizations were solidified by NAWSA's participation in the 1916 NCWV convention.

== Merger ==
With 15 states having ratified the 19th Amendment, universal women's suffrage was near at hand. As DeVoe had originally envisioned, NAWSA had run its natural course. However, some women in NAWSA still bore grudges against NCWV. Carrie Chapman Catt, who was leading the merger, was concerned that the baggage associated with DeVoe would discourage NAWSA members from continuing to participate. In addition to resentment against NCWV's origins, that the group's brief alliance with the Congressional Union had damaged the group's image, in light of Paul's increasing militancy. Catt worried that a uniting under the NCWV umbrella would lead some to perceive it as a partisan organization and therefore discourage moderate women from participating. She pushed instead for a nonpartisan organization that could unite women from all political backgrounds. As a result, rather than collapsing NAWSA into NCWV, the League of Women Voters was created.
