= WFMJ-TV =

Television station in Youngstown, Ohio

- Youngstown, Ohio; United States
- Channels: Digital: 33 (UHF); Virtual: 21
- Branding: 21 WFMJ; 21 News; WBCB, The Valley's CW (21.2)

Programming
- Affiliations: 21.1: NBC; 21.2: The CW; 21.3: Dabl

Ownership
- Owner: Maag family; (WFMJ Television, Inc.)

History
- Founded: July 1952
- First air date: March 8, 1953
- Former channel numbers: Analog: 73 (UHF, 1953–1954), 21 (UHF, 1954–2009); Digital: 20 (UHF, 2003–2019)
- Call sign meaning: William F. Maag Jr. (former publisher of the Youngstown Vindicator)

Technical information
- Licensing authority: FCC
- Facility ID: 72062
- ERP: 740 kW
- HAAT: 295 m (968 ft)
- Transmitter coordinates: 41°4′48.6″N 80°38′24.4″W

Links
- Public license information: Public file; LMS
- Website: www.wfmj.com

WFMJ-TV (channel 21) is a television station in Youngstown, Ohio, United States, affiliated with NBC and The CW. The station is locally owned by the Maag family. WFMJ-TV's studios are located on West Boardman Street in downtown Youngstown, and its transmitter is based in the city's Lansingville neighborhood.

From its inception until 2019, the station was owned by the Vindicator Printing Company, former publisher of Youngstown's lone newspaper, The Vindicator. On September 1, 2019; the Maags sold The Vindicator to Ogden Newspapers, which now operates it as an edition of the Tribune Chronicle in Warren. The Maags retained WFMJ-TV.

== History ==
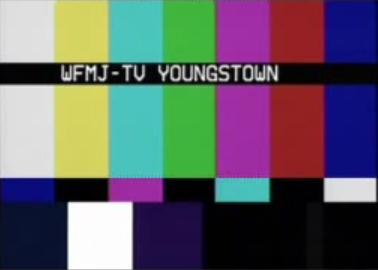
Test pattern for WFMJ-TV

The station was founded by William F. Maag, Jr., publisher of the Vindicator, and went on the air for the first time on March 8, 1953, on channel 73. The station was owned alongside WFMJ radio (1390 AM, now WNIO, and 105.1 FM, now WQXK). WFMJ-TV has always been an NBC affiliate owing to its radio sister's long affiliation with NBC Red Network. The Maags then purchased the construction permit issued for channel 21 (originally granted to WUTV) and moved to that frequency on August 7, 1954. After moving channels, WFMJ was replaced on channel 73 by independent station WXTV, which moved to channel 45 in 1959 (the former channel location of WYTV, then WKST-TV, before moving to channel 33) and remained on-the-air until late 1962.

From its sign-on until 1957, WFMJ-TV served as the NBC affiliate for the far northern portion of the Pittsburgh market, mainly areas not covered by WJAC-TV in Johnstown, Pennsylvania, and WTRF-TV in Wheeling, West Virginia, for NBC programming (the latter station is now affiliated with CBS). This ended when Pittsburgh got its own NBC affiliate, WIIC-TV (now WPXI), in September 1957. In addition to its main service area of extreme northeastern Ohio and northwestern Pennsylvania, WFMJ-TV can be seen as far as the eastern and southern suburbs of Cleveland with a good antenna, which allowed access to NBC programming pre-empted by KYW-TV from 1956 until 1965, when Cleveland's channel 3 was owned by Westinghouse Broadcasting, before the sale was undone and it returned to NBC ownership as WKYC.

WFMJ-TV has been the only locally owned and operated station in the market since CBS affiliate WKBN-TV (channel 27) was sold off in 1997. In fact, it is one of the few stations left in the country that is still locally owned and operated and one of two in Ohio, with the other being WCPO-TV in Cincinnati, with WBNS-TV in Columbus, WHIZ-TV in Zanesville, and WBNX-TV in Akron having been sold off in recent years to Tegna Inc., Marquee Broadcasting, and Nexstar Media Group respectively. Channel 21 points out often in advertisements noting that it is the "only locally-owned station in Youngstown". As a result, WFMJ has been a ratings juggernaut in Youngstown for several years.

WFMJ is the Youngstown market's carrier station for the Ohio Lottery and its weekly game show, Cash Explosion Double Play. In October 2010, WFMJ began carrying syndicated programs, and commercials in high definition whenever available in the format. In April 2011, the station started broadcasting Cash Explosion in HD.

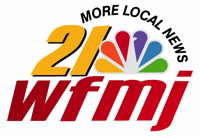
Logo of WFMJ, 2001–2016

In 2006, WFMJ opened a satellite studio at the Eastwood Mall in Niles, Ohio. Officially known as the Eastwood Mall Bureau, its primary focus is to cover news stories in Trumbull County, Ohio. It also features a retail store where people can buy WFMJ souvenirs, such as T-shirts embroidered with the WFMJ and/or WBCB logos.

On July 6, 2012, Dish Network subscribers within the Youngstown market temporarily lost access to WFMJ-TV, the result of a breakdown in negotiations between the satellite provider and owner Vindicator Printing Company to renew the station's carriage agreement with Dish.

== WFMJ-DT2 ==
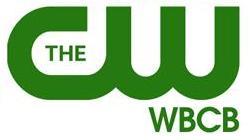
WFMJ-DT2's logo, 2006–2024.

WFMJ-DT2, branded The CW WBCB, is the CW-affiliated second digital subchannel of WFMJ-TV, broadcasting in 1080i high definition on channel 21.2. The subchannel can also be seen on all local cable and DBS systems including Comcast Xfinity, Charter Spectrum and DirecTV channel 14, and Armstrong Cable channel 16. It uses the unofficial call sign "WBCB" for identification and ratings purposes. Despite being part of The CW through a digital subchannel affiliation, WFMJ-DT2 is one of the few small-market CW affiliates carried via a digital multicast or local cable channel that is not part of The CW Plus; syndicated programming broadcast by the subchannel is instead supplied by WFMJ-TV.

=== History ===
The subchannel launched in November 2004 as an affiliate of The WB (branded The Valley's WB), and despite Youngstown's small market size (ranked #106 by Nielsen Media Research as of 2008), WBCB was one of the nation's first digital subchannels whose programming did not consist of 24-hour weather information (such as NBC Weather Plus). Around the time of launch, WFMJ chose to affiliate "WBCB" with The WB because the founders of Warner Bros. had lived in Youngstown at one point; the market had also been underserved by the network as Cleveland's then-WB affiliate WBNX-TV (later also a CW affiliate) was only carried on cable in the northern fringes of the market (despite being one of that network's strongest affiliates without Youngstown) while Pittsburgh WB affiliate WCWB (itself now affiliated with The CW and MyNetworkTV) was not even available on cable at all in the market (by contrast, Cleveland's then-UPN affiliate WUAB (earlier also a CW affiliate) was and remains widely available on cable in Youngstown, while WNPA/Pittsburgh was available in certain sections of the market).

Most of the market received WB network programming via "WBWO", a cable-only WB affiliate of The WB 100+ Station Group out of the Wheeling–Steubenville market, with systems owned and operated by Time Warner Cable (the largest cable provider in Youngstown) only receiving it during prime time hours, otherwise sharing channel space with MTV2. Comcast and Armstrong Cable both offered both MTV2 and WBWO 24 hours on their own channel space. The "WBCB" calls date back to the station's WB affiliation (affiliates of The WB 100+ Station Group commonly utilized fictional callsigns).

On January 24, 2006, UPN and The WB announced the two networks would cease broadcasting and merge to form The CW. "WBCB" would be chosen by default as the market's CW affiliate and for unknown reasons, the artificial call sign "WBCB" was kept after the subchannel affiliated with The CW in September 2006. With digital subchannels more common by this point, ABC affiliate WYTV launched a second digital subchannel affiliated with MyNetworkTV (under the branding "MY-YTV") that fall.

== News operation ==
As of December 2024, WFMJ presently broadcasts 31 1/2 hours of locally produced newscasts each week (with five hours on weekdays, three hours on Saturdays, and 3 1/2 hours on Sundays).

WFMJ's newscasts typically garner higher ratings than its competitors combined in the morning, 6 p.m. and 11 p.m. timeslots. The station founded the market's first Friday night high school football program with The Overtime Report in the 1990s. On October 29, 2009, beginning with the 6 p.m. newscast, the station upgraded its weather graphics to Weather Central's 3D:LIVE system. On October 26, 2013, WFMJ launched the area's first weekend morning news with WFMJ Weekend Today. The newscasts air on Saturdays from 6 to 7 a.m. and 9 to 10 a.m. and on Sundays from 7 to 8 a.m. and 9 to 10:30 a.m.

=== Notable former staff ===
- David Schechter (1995–1996)

== Subchannels ==
The station's signal is multiplexed:

Subchannels of WFMJ-TV
Channel	Res.	Short name	Programming
21.1	1080i	WFMJ-HD	NBC
21.2	1080i	CW-HD	The CW
21.3	480i	Dabl-SD	Dabl
