= First Universalist Church of Sharpsville =

Historic church in Pennsylvania, United States

- U.S. National Register of Historic Places
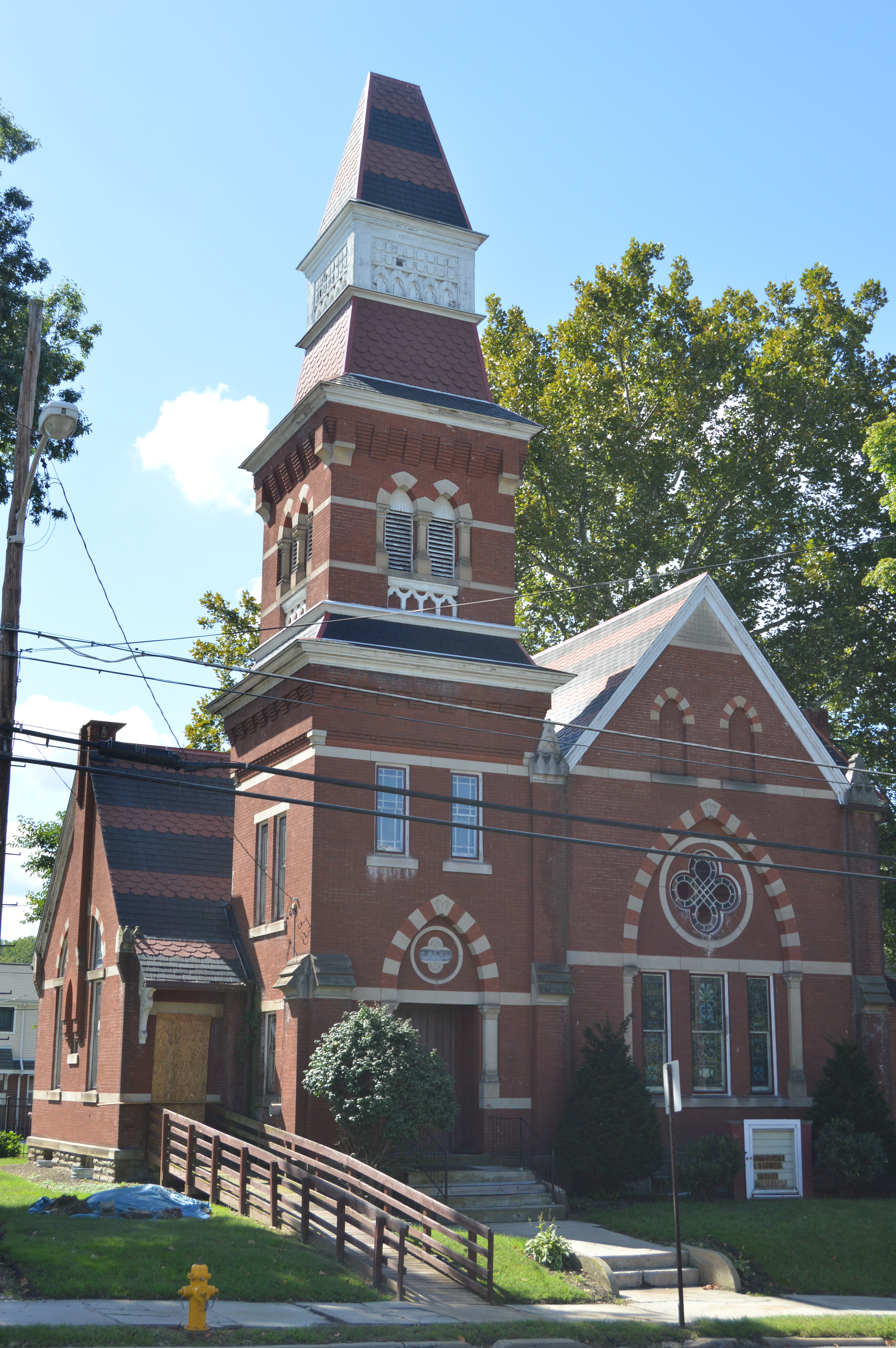
- Front of the church

- Location within Pennsylvania Location within the United States
- Location: 131 N. Mercer Ave., Sharpsville, Pennsylvania
- Coordinates: 41°15′59″N 80°28′33″W
- Area: less than one acre
- Built: 1882
- Architect: Sidney W. Foulk
- Architectural style: Gothic
- NRHP reference No.: 03000491
- Added to NRHP: May 29, 2003

First Universalist Church of Sharpsville is a historic Universalist church located at 131 N. Mercer Avenue in Sharpsville, Mercer County, Pennsylvania, United States. The church was built between 1882 and 1884, and is a richly decorated brick and stone church building in a High Victorian Gothic style. It measures 52 feet by 42 feet and the interior takes the Akron plan. The property includes the parsonage; a two-story Queen Anne style dwelling built in 1888.

It was added to the National Register of Historic Places in 2003. The Sharpsville Area Historical Society purchased the building in 2000 and is in the process of restoring it. The building serves as the Society's headquarters.
