= Zell Hart Deming =

American suffragist and newspaper editor (1869–1936)

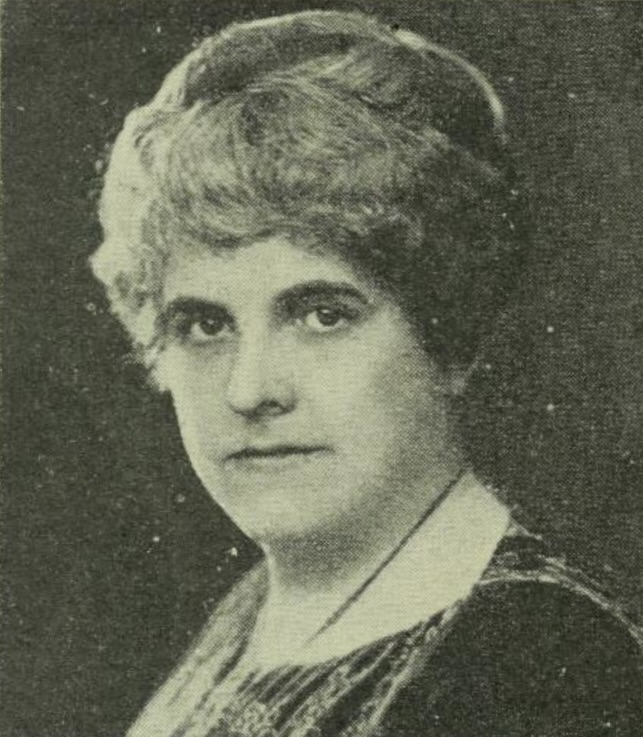
- Zell Hart Deming in 1925
- Born: Zell Patti Smith; September 18, 1869; Warren, Ohio, US
- Died: April 26, 1936 (aged 66); New York City, US
- Burial place: Oakwood Cemetery, Warren, Ohio, US
- Employer: The Warren Tribune
- Organization(s): Associated Press and National Council of Women Voters
- Children: 1
- Relatives: Hart Crane (nephew)

Zell Patti Smith Hart Deming (September 18, 1869 ‒ April 26, 1936) was an American suffragist, philanthropist and newspaper editor. She was the first female member of the Associated Press and president of The Warren Tribune Chronicle.

== Family ==
Deming was born in 1869 in Warren, Trumbull County, Ohio. Her parents were James Smith and Mary Ann Douglas. She married Frank Hart and the couple moved to Chicago, Illinois. They had a daughter, before he died in 1893. She returned home to Warren. In 1907, she remarried to William C. Deming and they divorced in 1918.

== Career ==
Deming began her career at The Warren Tribune, working firstly as their society editor. Brenda Linert has shared how she: "had demonstrated such competence and business acumen that within a year, she was elected secretary and treasurer of the newspaper and was given an opportunity to purchase stock in the company. Within four years, she had acquired majority ownership of the company’s stock. This was a remarkable move because at that time the field was so dominated by men."

In 1924, Deming bought the competing newspaper The Chronicle and merged it with The Warren Tribune to create The Warren Tribune Chronicle. She worked as their president and director, taking minor it from local circulation to a nationally syndicated newspaper. She oversaw a staff team of fifty.

She became the first female member of the Associated Press, joining in 1928. She was also a member of the American Society of Newspaper Editors.

== Activism and philanthropy ==
Deming was also a suffragist and was a member and the treasurer of the Ohio State Suffrage Association. She used her paper as a platform for supporting the campaign for votes for women. She later became a member of the National Council of Women Voters, appointed by Wyoming's Governor.

She used her wealth for philanthropy, sponsoring local artists and writers. This included sponsoring painter Carl Schmitt and giving funds to her nephew Hart Crane, who became a modernist poet. She also nurtured his appreciation of art. The Yale University Archives hold correspondence between Crane and his aunt in their Hart Crane Collection.

== Death and legacy ==
She died while attending an Associated Press meeting in New York City in 1936. She was buried in Oakwood Cemetery in Warren, Ohio. After her death, Deming passed on her paper to her daughter Helen Hart Hurlbert.

In 1942, Deming was nominated for election to Ohio State University's Journalism Hall of Fame.
