= Jack Berch =

American baritone singer

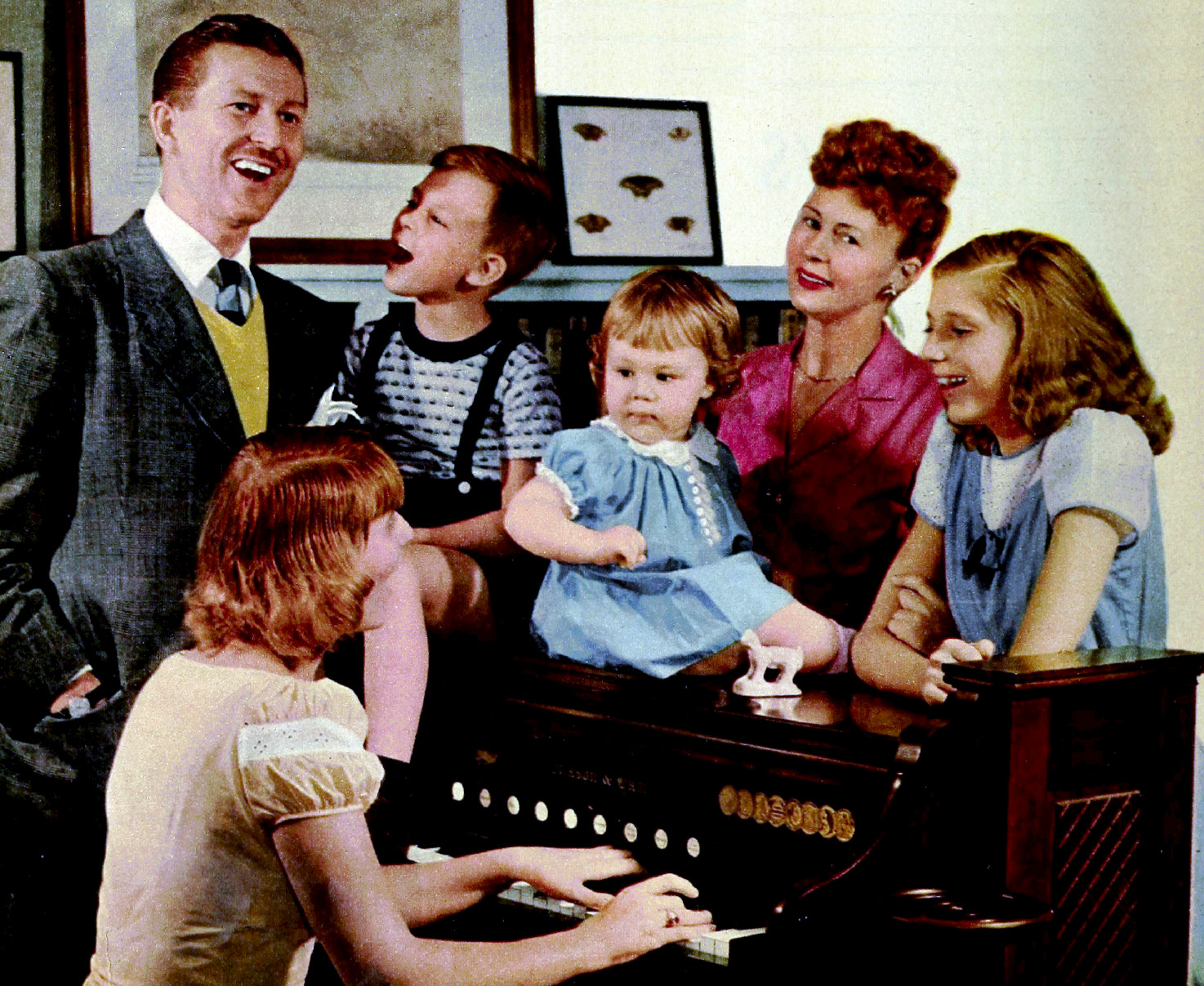
- Berch and family in 1949
- Born: August 26, 1907 or August 26, 1911; Sigel, Illinois
- Died: December 10, 1992; Jamaica, New York
- Education: St. Viator College
- Occupation: Singer
- Known for: Radio programs
- Spouse: Margo Orwig
- Children: 4

Jack Berch (August 26, 1907 or 1911 – December 10, 1992) was an American baritone singer best known for his radio variety/talk programs from 1935 to 1954.

== Early years ==
Berch was born in Sigel, Illinois, where his father ran a general store. Following his father's death, Berch began working after school as a stock boy in a dry goods store when he was "about 11 years old". His primary and secondary education came in Effingham, Illinois.

Berch graduated from St. Viator College. During his college years, he was a dishwasher and played drums for a dance band. He later worked as a door-to-door coffee salesman who sang as he approached the door of a house. When one potential customer in Youngstown, Ohio, turned out to be the wife of the manager of radio station WKBN, that led to an audition.

== Radio ==
Berch's first job on radio was at WKBN. He had dual roles as a singer and an announcer, "introducing himself in one voice and singing in another. Then he would thank himself for the performance."

He also worked at WLW in Cincinnati, WTAM in Cleveland and WOAI in San Antonio.

Berch was the star of The Jack Berch Show, a variety/talk program that was broadcast on ABC, CBS, Mutual and NBC at various times from 1935 to 1954. His programs at times went by other names, including The Kitchen Pirate (1935–36) and The Sweetheart Serenader (1939–1941). A comment published in the trade publication Radio Daily said, "The singing of Berch is particularly well designed to give the day a sunny sendoff."

At times, he also wrote scripts and worked as an announcer and producer on other people's programs.

== Recording ==
In 1950, Berch signed a contract with RCA Victor to make recordings in both children's and popular music genres.

== Personal life ==
Berch was married to the former Margo Orwig. They had a son, Jon, and daughters Carol, Shirley, and Mollie.

== Death ==
Berch died on December 10, 1992, in Jamaica, New York.

== Partial discography ==
- Shenanigans/The Greatest Mistake of My Life - 1949 with The Charlie Magnante Trio (London 559)
- The Letter I Forgot to Mail/Kemo Kimo - 1949 with The Charlie Magnante Trio (Regent 144)
- Bibbi-Di Bobba-Di Boo/Cinderella - 1950 with The Mullen Sisters and The Charlie Magnante Trio (London 20012)
- Sunday School Songs (Parts I & II) - 1950 (Victor 470222)
- The Teddy Bear's Picnic/Me and My Teddy Bear - 1950 with the Henri René Orchestra (Victor 47–0225)
- The Little Lost Sheep - 1952 (Bibletone KL 221)
