= Sigel, Illinois =

Sigel
- Town
- Location of Sigel in Shelby County, Illinois.
- Coordinates: 39°13′34″N 88°29′53″W
- Country: United States
- State: Illinois
- County: Shelby
- Incorporated: March 7, 1867

Area
  - Total: 0.29 sq mi (0.75 km^{2})
  - Land: 0.28 sq mi (0.73 km^{2})
  - Water: 0.0077 sq mi (0.02 km^{2})
- Elevation: 637 ft (194 m)

Population (2020)
  - Total: 329
  - Density: 1,170.3/sq mi (451.84/km^{2})
- Time zone: UTC-6 (CST)
  - Summer (DST): UTC-5 (CDT)
- ZIP Code(s): 62462
- Area code: 217
- FIPS code: 17-69914
- GNIS ID: 2397663

Sigel is an incorporated town in Shelby County, Illinois, United States. The population was 329 at the 2020 census.

The town was named after Franz Sigel, (1824–1902), a Union general in the American Civil War.

== Geography ==
According to the 2010 census, Sigel has a total area of 0.288 square miles (0.75 km^{2}), of which 0.28 square miles (0.73 km^{2}) (or 97.22%) is land and 0.008 square miles (0.02 km^{2}) (or 2.78%) is water.

== Demographics ==
Historical population
Census	Pop.	Note	%±
1880	302		—
1890	258		−14.6%
1900	293		13.6%
1910	308		5.1%
1920	292		−5.2%
1930	259		−11.3%
1940	281		8.5%
1950	296		5.3%
1960	387		30.7%
1970	337		−12.9%
1980	360		6.8%
1990	344		−4.4%
2000	386		12.2%
2010	373		−3.4%
2020	329		−11.8%
U.S. Decennial Census

As of the census of 2000, there were 386 people, 141 households, and 97 families residing in the town. The population density was 1,411.6 inhabitants per square mile (545.0/km^{2}). There were 154 housing units at an average density of 563.2 per square mile (217.5/km^{2}). The racial makeup of the town was 99.22% White, 0.52% from other races, and 0.26% from two or more races. Hispanic or Latino of any race were 1.81% of the population.

There were 141 households, out of which 35.5% had children under the age of 18 living with them, 51.8% were married couples living together, 12.1% had a female householder with no husband present, and 30.5% were non-families. 29.8% of all households were made up of individuals, and 14.2% had someone living alone who was 65 years of age or older. The average household size was 2.72 and the average family size was 3.38.

In the town, the population was spread out, with 31.3% under the age of 18, 10.4% from 18 to 24, 27.2% from 25 to 44, 16.3% from 45 to 64, and 14.8% who were 65 years of age or older. The median age was 33 years. For every 100 females, there were 103.2 males. For every 100 females age 18 and over, there were 89.3 males.

The median income for a household in the town was $36,607, and the median income for a family was $51,500. Males had a median income of $34,375 versus $22,656 for females. The per capita income for the town was $15,933. About 2.4% of families and 3.9% of the population were below the poverty line, including 1.7% of those under age 18 and 9.8% of those age 65 or over.

== Notable people ==
- Jack Berch, singer, was born in Sigel.
