= Jonas J. Pierce House =

Historic house in Pennsylvania, United States

- U.S. National Register of Historic Places
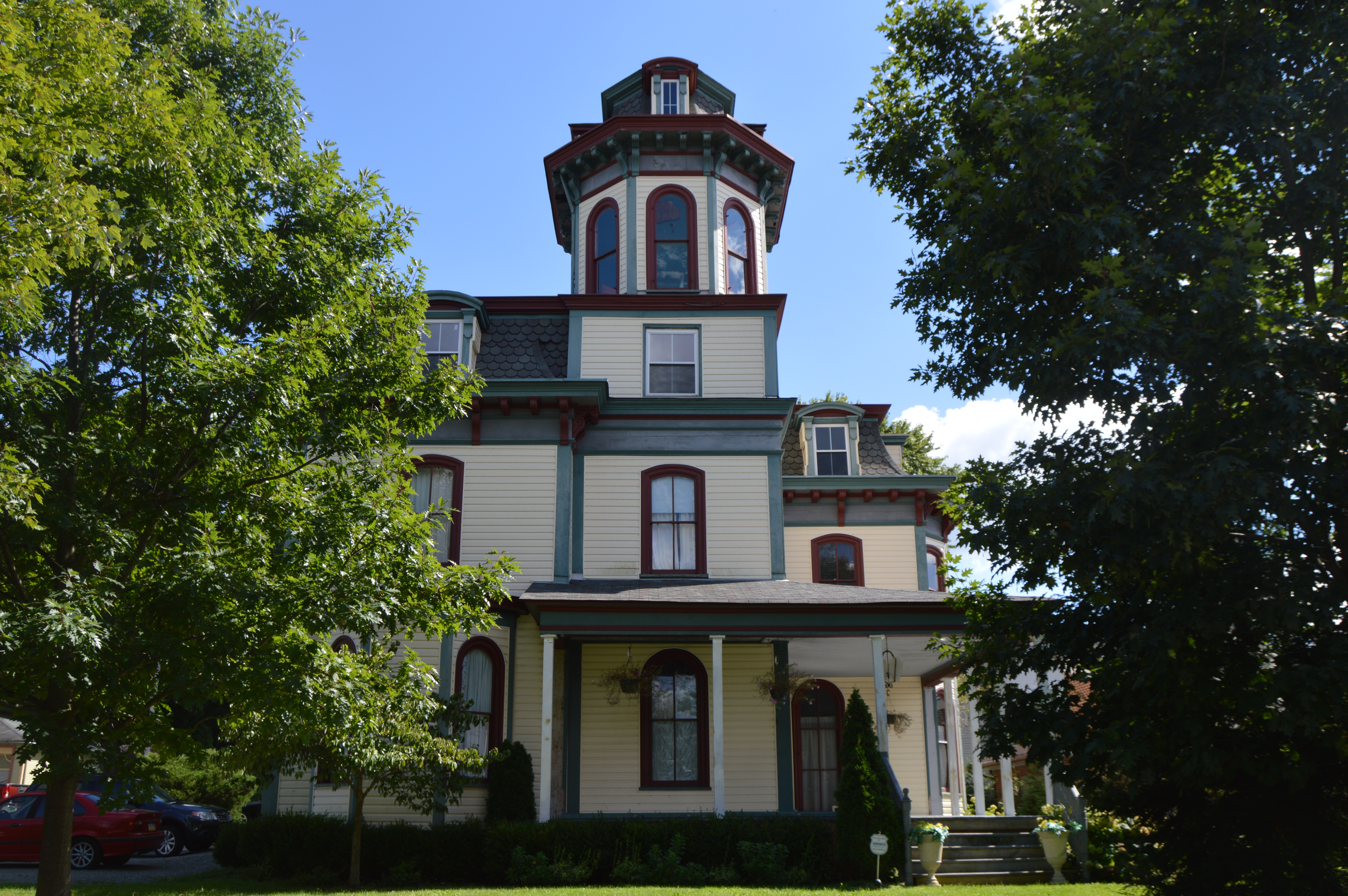
- Front of the house

- Location within Pennsylvania Location within the United States
- Location: 18 E. Shenango St., Sharpsville, Pennsylvania
- Coordinates: 41°15′57″N 80°28′12″W
- Area: less than one acre
- Built: 1868
- Architectural style: Second Empire
- NRHP reference No.: 96001206
- Added to NRHP: October 24, 1996

Jonas J. Pierce House is a historic home located at Sharpsville, Mercer County, Pennsylvania. It was built in 1868, and is a three-story, wood-frame residence in the Second Empire style. It is three bays by five bays, and features a mansard roof and large octagonal tower. The house was converted to apartments about 1942.

It was added to the National Register of Historic Places in 1996.
