= Idaho Library Association =

Professional association for librarians in Idaho

- Nickname: ILA
- Formation: December 29, 1915; 110 years ago
- Tax ID no.: 82-6028093
- Headquarters: Boise, Idaho
- Parent organization: American Library Association
- Website: www.idaholibraries.org

The Idaho Library Association (ILA) is a professional organization for Idaho's librarians and library workers based in Boise, Idaho.

== History ==
The Idaho Library Association was founded as the Idaho State Library Association on December 29, 1915, at Boise High School during a meeting called by Margaret S. Roberts, the librarian of the Free Traveling Library Commission.

Gretchen L. Smith, a librarian at the Idaho Technical Institute in Pocatello, was the association's first president. The association changed its name to the Idaho Library Association in 1962 and became officially incorporated in 1967.

== Publications ==
The Idaho Librarian ISSN 2151-7738 was the journal of the Idaho Library Association until 2016. The LiLAC Newsletter is a quarterly newsletter published by the Library Leadership Advisory Committee.

== See also ==
- List of libraries in the United States
