= WYTV =

Television station in Youngstown, Ohio

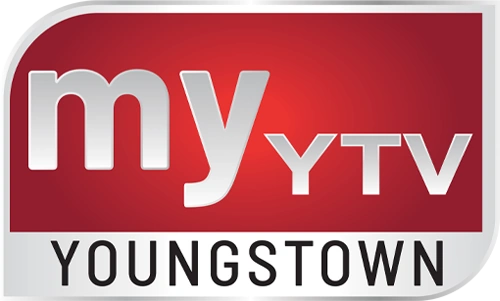
- Youngstown, Ohio; United States
- Channels: Digital: 31 (UHF), shared with WKBN-TV; Virtual: 33
- Branding: 33 WYTV; 33 News

Programming
- Affiliations: 33.1: ABC; 33.2: Independent with MyNetworkTV

Ownership
- Owner: Vaughan Media; (WYTV Television, LLC)
- Operator: Nexstar Media Group via JSA/SSA
- Sister stations: WKBN-TV, WYFX-LD

History
- First air date: April 4, 1953
- Former call signs: WKST-TV (1953–1963); WYTV (1963–1983); WYTV-TV (1983–1998)
- Former channel numbers: Analog: 45 (UHF, 1953–1959), 33 (UHF, 1959–2009); Digital: 36 (UHF, 2000–2019)
- Former affiliations: Fox (secondary, 1994–1998)
- Call sign meaning: Youngstown Television

Technical information
- Licensing authority: FCC
- Facility ID: 4693
- ERP: 703 kW
- HAAT: 437.1 m (1,434 ft)
- Transmitter coordinates: 41°3′23.4″N 80°38′43″W
- Translator(s): WYTV-DT2: WYFX-LD 62.2 Youngstown

Links
- Public license information: Public file; LMS
- Website: www.wytv.com

WYTV (channel 33) is a television station in Youngstown, Ohio, United States, affiliated with ABC and MyNetworkTV. It is owned by Vaughan Media, LLC, which maintains joint sales and shared services agreements (JSA/SSA) with Nexstar Media Group, owner of CBS affiliate WKBN-TV (channel 27) and low-power Fox affiliate WYFX-LD (channel 62), for the provision of certain services. The three stations share studios on Sunset Boulevard in Youngstown's Pleasant Grove neighborhood, where WYTV's transmitter is also located.

== History ==
The station originated as WKST-TV (UHF analog channel 45) as the television partner to WKST radio, and was licensed to New Castle, Pennsylvania, on April 4, 1953.

Besides serving New Castle, it was the default ABC affiliate in Youngstown, making Youngstown at the time one of the smallest markets to have full-time affiliates of all three networks (following the demise of the DuMont Television Network), as ABC would be relegated to secondary status in many markets until the 1970s. It also served the northern and western portions of the Pittsburgh market with poor signals from WENS (frequency now occupied by WINP-TV). After WENS signed off due to financial problems (some assets would be used to launch what eventually became WPNT), WKST-TV was the only full-time ABC affiliate in Western Pennsylvania until September 1958 when WTAE-TV went live; future sister station WJET-TV would sign on in Erie, Pennsylvania, in 1966.

After being dark for a period of time, WKST-TV moved to the stronger channel 33 in 1959, improving its over-the-air signal in the process. After moving channels, WYTV was replaced on channel 45 by WXTV, an independent station that signed on in November 1960; WXTV would be forced off the air on February 28, 1962, and never resumed broadcasting, the FCC denied their license application in April 1964 after an extensive investigation into it and co-owned WWIZ in Lorain, Ohio. In 1973, channel 45 was re-allocated to nearby Alliance, Ohio, as an educational channel and became WNEO. In September 1963, WKST-TV moved its city of license and most of its operations to Youngstown under its current call letters, WYTV.

WYTV was owned by a consortium of local investors until 1965, when a group headed by Adam Young Inc. (whose namesake founder, along with his son Vincent, would start Young Broadcasting 21 years later) purchased the station. A company known as Aurovideo, Inc., which was owned by the Adams-Russell Company, acquired WYTV on November 13, 1970. On June 22, 1983, Benedek Broadcasting purchased 50% of the station with investor Robert L. Dudley, and formed the Youngstown Broadcasting Company as licensee. Benedek purchased the remaining stake on November 25, 1985,

Like many small television markets, clearance issues arose in Youngstown for the fledgling Fox network when it obtained rights to the National Football League in 1994, as there were no stations to take on a primary affiliation with Fox. The network originally approached WKBN-TV to carry its NFL coverage that March, but that station passed due to threats from CBS to refuse to feed 60 Minutes to any of its affiliates that signed up. With WFMJ already carrying the NFL on NBC, WYTV was the only station left and announced a deal to carry Fox's NFL coverage on April 11, 1994. WYTV never cleared any of Fox's prime time programming, which was available to cable subscribers via the network's affiliates in Cleveland (WJW) and Pittsburgh (WPGH). WYTV retained its secondary affiliation until WKBN-TV's ownership launched WYFX-LP as the market's primary Fox affiliate in time for the 1998 season—a significant revenue loss that contributed to layoffs and the temporary cancellation of the station's morning newscast.

Benedek Broadcasting remained the station's owner until the company's bankruptcy filing in 2002. Instead of being purchased by Gray Television, WYTV was bought by Chelsey Television, LLC and was managed by Barrington Broadcasting. The station has applied to increase its digital signal to one megawatt at the end of the transition.

On February 6, 2007, Chelsey Television filed an application with the FCC to sell WYTV to Los Angeles–based Parkin Broadcasting (later PBC Broacasting), owned by Todd Parkin, which then leased out the station to WKBN/WYFX owner New Vision Television under a shared services agreement—essentially a local marketing agreement under different legal terms. At the time, some critics wondered if the shared services agreement was legal, since the Youngstown market only has four full-power television stations (WFMJ, WKBN, WYTV, and PBS member station WNEO)—not enough to legally permit a duopoly under FCC rules. New Vision and PBC share an office building in Los Angeles and have a "cozy relationship", leading to speculation that PBC is simply a shell corporation that enables New Vision to circumvent FCC ownership rules. This is not unlike what Sinclair Broadcast Group does with Cunningham Broadcasting, which is a shell corporation of Sinclair. Nonetheless, the FCC approved the shared services agreement on July 30, 2007. WYTV then moved from its 3800 Shady Run Road studios over to the WKBN/WYFX facilities in Boardman Township.

On May 7, 2012, LIN TV Corporation announced that it will acquire the New Vision Television station group for $330.4 million and the assumption of $12 million in debt. Along with the outright ownership of WKBN-TV, the agreement includes the acquisition of New Vision's shared services agreement with PBC (which is also transferring the licenses of then PBC-owned stations WYTV, KTKA-TV in Topeka, Kansas, and WTGS in Savannah, Georgia, to Vaughan Media), giving LIN operational control of WYTV. LIN and Vaughan also entered into a joint sales agreement for WYTV. On October 2, the FCC approved the proposed sale to LIN TV. The transaction was closed on October 12, 2012.

On March 21, 2014, Media General announced that it would purchase LIN Media and its stations, including WKBN-TV, WYFX-LD, and the SSA and JSA with WYTV, in a $1.6 billion merger. The FCC approved the deal on December 12, 2014, but a condition of the deal requires Media General to end the JSA between WKBN-TV and WYTV within two years due to tighter regulations on such deals. The merger was completed on December 19. Despite the conditions, WKBN-TV continues to operate WYTV, including after Nexstar Media Group acquired Media General in early 2017.

In 2017, WKBN sold its spectrum for $34 million as part of the FCC's spectrum reallocation program and will move its broadcasting to WYTV's frequency. WKBN-TV moved to WYTV's frequency on April 23, 2018. To make room for WKBN-TV, Bounce TV moved from 33.3 to WYFX's 19.4 while Ion Television moved from 27.3 to WYFX 19.3.

=== MyYTV ===
On June 13, 2006, WYTV announced that it would launch a new second digital subchannel in September 2006 featuring MyNetworkTV. The move made that station the last full-power channel to launch a secondary subchannel in Youngstown. The official launch occurred September 5 while soon after on September 18 WB outlet "WBCB" (controlled and operated by NBC affiliate WFMJ-TV) became part of The CW. The digital subchannel is branded as "MyYTV", and simulcasts on WYFX-LD2.

At its sign-on, it originally aired eighteen hours of original local programming each week and another 30½ hours of programming that was not original. The station carries taped high school football and basketball "Game of the Week" match-ups as well as tape delayed Youngstown State University football along with men's and women's basketball home games. It also aired Mahoning Valley Thunder arena football games and currently show select Mahoning Valley Scrappers baseball games.

For a period as a separate station, WYTV produced a prime time newscast at 10 on this MyNetworkTV second digital subchannel. This competed with another broadcast airing at the same time on Fox affiliate WYFX that is still produced today by WKBN. WYTV-DT2 currently repeats the main channel's weekday morning show from 7 to 9 that is known as 33 News at Daybreak. This broadcast features news anchor Len Rome (who is also a health reporter, "Good Question" segment producer, and feature reporter), weather caster Jim Loboy, and news reporter Greta Mittereder (who also produces the "Greta On The Go" segment).

== Programming ==
=== Children's programming ===
WYTV became known for its programming targeted to kids. WYTV aired cartoons and other kid-themed programming between the after school hours of 4 and 6 p.m. It once aired a kids' show during the 1980s entitled 33 Powwww which consisted of a "voice-activated" video game powered by the Mattel Intellivision. Viewers would call in to play this game and win prizes. Cartoons were also aired during the show. The TV POWWW concept was a syndicated franchise seen on television stations throughout the United States such as WCLQ in Cleveland (now WQHS-TV). WYTV also has produced the local quiz show YSU Academic Challenge in which high school and middle school students from all over the area answered questions for prizes.

=== Saving Private Ryan ===
WYTV was not among the ABC affiliates to preempt the Veterans Day airing of the film Saving Private Ryan in 2004 out of fears of being fined by the FCC for indecency in the wake of the Super Bowl XXXVIII halftime show controversy, feeling that the film aired unedited on terrestrial television in the past without FCC repercussions. Because WYTV did opt to air Saving Private Ryan, this gave viewers in the Columbus, Cleveland, and Pittsburgh television markets that were able to view WYTV either over-the-air or on cable television the option of watching the film, since Sinclair Broadcast Group, E. W. Scripps Company, and Hearst-Argyle Television (owners of WSYX, WEWS-TV, and WTAE-TV, respectively) did not allow any of their ABC affiliates to air the film. As Sinclair and Scripps each own additional ABC affiliates in the state, WYTV ultimately was one of only two ABC affiliates in the state of Ohio to air the film, alongside then-ABC owned-and-operated station WTVG. It was later determined that showing the movie was not a violation of FCC regulations.

=== News operation ===
As of December 2024, WYTV presently broadcasts 26 1/2 hours of locally produced newscasts each week (with 5 1/2 hours each weekday and one hour each on Saturdays and Sundays).

For a period as a separate station, WYTV produced a prime time newscast at 10 p.m. on its MyNetworkTV second digital subchannel. This competed with another broadcast airing at the same time on Fox affiliate WYFX that was produced by WKBN.

In December 2007, the news departments of WYTV and WKBN physically merged. As a result, over 40 personnel at WYTV and six at WKBN were laid-off. Under the shared services agreement, the senior station partner began producing newscasts on this ABC affiliate from a secondary set at the Sunset Boulevard studios. A previous plan calling for WYTV to build streetside satellite studios in downtown Youngstown was abandoned due to the consolidation. The current operational status of its Doppler weather radar based at the old facility on Shady Run Road is unknown. The two stations gradually had their on-air looks mirror each other while their respective websites became identical. New logos for the stations and updated websites debuted in January 2009 including combined operations for sports and weather.

Due to the duopoly, WYTV and WKBN maintain separate primary anchors for news, weather, and sports during the week but share most general assignment reporters and video footage. The two initially maintained separate websites as well; however, after LIN Media took over ownership of WKBN/WYFX and operations of WYTV, WYTV's website became a redirect to WKBN's website with only WYTV's station identification information available on WKBN's site.

On May 6, 2010, the two outlets upgraded their combined news operation to high definition complete with new graphics on WYTV.

In November 2013, WYTV along with WKBN debuted a branded tool for showing live broadcasts from a moving vehicle. "33 Live Drive Action Cam" is a Jeep Patriot that can chase storms, show road conditions and respond to breaking news.

Also in November 2013, WYTV began separating its content from that of WKBN and WYFX. This included WYTV receiving its own website once again.

== Subchannels ==
Subchannels of WYTV and WKBN-TV
| License | Channel | Res. | Short name | Programming |
|---|---|---|---|---|
| WYTV | 33.1 | 720p | WYTV-HD | ABC |
| WYTV | 33.2 | 480i | MyYTV | Independent with MyNetworkTV |
| WKBN-TV | 27.1 | 1080i | WKBN-HD | CBS |
| WKBN-TV | 27.2 | 720p | WYFX-HD | Fox (WYFX-LD) |

Simulcast of subchannels of another station
