= YSU Academic Challenge =

American high school quiz bowl program

YSU Academic Challenge is the Youngstown, Ohio area high school quiz bowl program that airs on ABC station WYTV on Saturday nights and reairs on Sunday nights on MyYTV. Stan Boney, the chief meteorologist at WYTV, is the host of this program that premiered in 2002. In 2008 Academic Challenge changed its appearance but kept its old rules.

== Original format ==
When it premiered, the show was taped at Bliss Hall on the campus of Youngstown State University. Two teams of four students representing different high schools across the WYTV viewing area compete in a game similar to that of the format of College Bowl.

In the first season, questions were restricted to ten categories announced by the host at the start of the show (e.g. Social Science, Sports and Leisure). One team was given a category and a question. A correct answer was worth 10 points, and the right to answer more questions until the team missed one. Upon an incorrect answer, the other team could attempt that same question, but its value was halved.

Towards the end of the match, the teams could wager any part of or all of their points to answer one final question, à la Final Jeopardy! on Jeopardy! A correct answer added the wagered points, while an incorrect answer deducted them. The team with the most points won the game and advanced through further rounds of an elimination tournament to determine the champion.

== Current format ==
Prior to the start of the second season, production moved to the studio at the station. The format was also changed.

Two teams of four still competed. The first round is called the Buzz-In round. A special category is announced by the host prior to the start of the match, and is in play throughout the game. In the Buzz-In Round, all players have buzzers in hand. A question is asked, and the first team to ring in gets to answer the question. A correct answer is worth 10 points. In the Buzz-In round only, 10 points are deducted for an incorrect answer. Only the team that buzzed in first gets to answer a question (no capitalizing on an opposing team's miss in this round).

Round two originally was the Lightning Round (more on this round below), but is currently the Volleyball Round. The team that is trailing starts the round. Each team takes turns answering questions. A correct answer is once again worth 10 points. If an incorrect answer is given, the other team gets the opportunity to attempt that same question, along with one of their own. No team can control the board for more than two questions. The special category is again in play. (In an earlier version of the Volleyball Round, a team kept control as long as they answered questions correctly.)

Round three originally was the Volleyball Round, but is currently the Lightning Round. In the Lightning Round, the team that is trailing starts the round by selecting a packet of questions marked either "A" or "B". The team will have 3 minutes to answer as many questions as they can. Correct answers are worth 10 points. A team can also elect to pass on a question if they do not know the answer. The special category is in play for this round. The process then repeats for the other team.

Round four is the Final Challenge Round, with buzzers. Correct answers are worth 10 points, but an incorrect answer gives the other team the opportunity to steal the points with a correct answer. The team with the most points wins the game and advances through further rounds of an elimination tournament to determine the champion. In the event of a tie at the end of the Final Challenge Round, an additional question is asked, following the rules of the Final Challenge Round. This "one-question playoff" was used during the game between Springfield and Lakeview on April 12, 2008. Lakeview buzzed in and answered the question correctly to win the game.

Throughout the school year, the teams competing are high school teams. A middle school tournament is also held during the summer.

== Toledo version ==
A new version of this show premiered on December 11, 2010, on WNWO-TV in Toledo, OH and on December 12, 2010, on WBGU-TV in Bowling Green, OH. This version was originally hosted by WNWO's chief meteorologist, Norm Van Ness (currently hosted by Morgan Kozinski), and uses the same rules as the Youngstown version. The special category was added to this version in its second season, but was later dropped.

== Youngstown High School Champions ==
| Year | Winning team |
|---|---|
| 2003 | Liberty |
| 2004 | Ursuline; Runner Up: Lisbon |
| 2005 | Howland |
| 2006 | Salem |
| 2007 | Boardman |
| 2008 | Cardinal Mooney |
| 2009 | Howland |
| 2010 | Cardinal Mooney |
| 2011 | Warren G. Harding |
