= The Vindicator (Ohio newspaper) =

Newspaper in northeast Ohio

- Type: Daily newspaper
- Format: Broadsheet
- Owner: Ogden Newspapers Inc.
- Editor: Ed Puskas
- Founded: 1869; 157 years ago
- Headquarters: 240 Franklin Street SE; Warren, Ohio 44482; United States
- ISSN: 0890-9857
- OCLC number: 12961328
- Website: vindy.com
- Free online archives: Google News; Vindy Archives

The Vindicator is a daily newspaper serving Youngstown, Ohio, United States and the Mahoning County region as well as southern Trumbull County and northern Columbiana County. The Vindicator was established in 1869. As of September 1, 2019, The Vindicator is owned by Ogden Newspapers Inc. of Wheeling, West Virginia. The new owners of The Vindicator announced a welcome to the new version of the Vindicator.

== History (1869–1984) ==
The paper began in 1869 when it launched as The Mahoning Vindicator. The paper became the Youngstown Vindicator shortly after. During the 1920s, Ku Klux Klan members began protesting outside of then owner William F. Maag, Jr.'s house in response to the paper's reporting of local KKK activities. Its reporting on the KKK, the mafia, political corruption, and big business matters garnered the paper a reputation of fearlessness. Almost 70 politicians, mafia members, and business people were convicted of criminal acts as a result of the paper's reporting in the late 1980s. In 1984, the paper became The Vindicator.

== The Vindicator's past owners ==
Before September 1, 2019, The Vindicator was locally owned by the Maag family (longtime area residents) and run by the now ceased Vindicator Printing Company, which still runs local NBC affiliate WFMJ-TV and WFMJ's digital subchannel, CW affiliate WBCB. Historically, the paper is known for its reputation of fearless reporting on matters relating to local corruption, the mafia, and the Ku Klux Klan.

On August 16, 2019, The Vindicator and Tribune Chronicle reached an agreement for the Tribune Chronicle to acquire The Vindicator's subscription list, The Vindicator masthead and the Vindy.com domain, according to The Vindicator former general manager Mark Brown. After August 31, 2019, The Vindicator temporarily ceased publication and operations were turned over to the staff of its former primary competitor, the Tribune Chronicle, in nearby Warren, Ohio. The Tribune Chronicle's traditional news coverage area is Trumbull County and parts of northeastern Portage County as opposed to the broader news coverage area of The Vindicator. The Tribune Chronicle has now published The Vindicator for the Mahoning County region since September 1, 2019.

== Switching eras ==
The Vindicator published a special final edition from the former owners of The Vindicator Printing Company on the evening of August 30, 2019. The former staff gathered that evening to print more than 34,000 of the final edition papers. The paper produced around 3,500 more copies than usual to meet the high demand for the final printing. The former employees, their families and friends gathered at the former press room at 9 p.m. to see the former printing presses fired up one last time. The former staff members included Publisher Betty Brown Jagnow, General Manager Mark Brown, Editor Todd Franko, Politics & Community Columnist Bertram de Souza and Chief Photographer Robert K. Yosay.

== Sections (before August 31, 2019) ==
Monday through Saturday, the newspaper publishes three sections:

- Local and national news as well as editorial (Section A)
- Sports and weather (Section B)
- Classifieds, Valley Life and comics (Section C)

Each Thursday before August 31, 2019, The Vindicator prints Valley 24, a tabloid style entertainment guide for the coming weekend. On Saturdays, a TV listings magazine is included. The Sunday edition is, like most other newspapers, greatly expanded. Each Sunday, The Vindicator publishes a page entitled "Connected" which includes curated, Youngstown-themed social media posts and a column written by social media researcher and critic Adam Earnheardt. In addition to the sections mentioned, there is also sections dedicated to business, entertainment, life and work, and health, among others. As of September 1, 2019, TICKET, a special section produced by the Tribune Chronicle and led by Andy Gray, the Tribune Chronicle's veteran entertainment writer, each Thursday has provided award-winning coverage of the local entertainment scene. TICKET now will be published in The Vindicator edition as well.

== Websites (before August 31, 2019) ==
The Vindicator operated four primary websites: the news and information site vindy.com; a local employment portal vindyjobs.com; vindywheels.com, a local automotive shopping site; and vindyhomes.com, a local real estate site.

The vast majority of content available on vindy.com is provided at no charge. There is, however, a "digital edition" available on the site at the same subscription rate as the printed edition. It is delivered in PDF format.

The Vindicator breaks local news on its primary website, vindy.com, throughout the day and night. This feature is branded "News Watch" and is updated more frequently than the general site. As of September 1, 2019, vindy.com is controlled by the Tribune Chronicle. The vindy.com website, post September 1, 2019, is a completely new website and does not host any older articles or content archives. Additionally, the Disqus commenting system which was on the previous website is gone as the new owners have opted for comment free articles. The older articles and content archives can be found by the old owners at vindyarchives.com website.

== Strike action ==
The paper's staff has gone on strike twice. The first strike was in 1964 and lasted nearly eight months; the strikers published the Steel Valley News during this time. The second strike lasted from November 2004 to July 2005, and the strikers published their own paper, The Valley Voice, during this time.

== Editorial changes ==
Prior to August 31, 2019, Todd Franko, metro editor of The Rockford Register Star in Illinois, was named editor of The Vindicator on February 12, 2007. He succeeds Paul C. Jagnow, who retired in 2006. As of September 1, 2019, The Vindicator is now published by Tribune Chronicle of which Ed Puskas is the editor.

In March 2024, The Vindicator and the Tribune Chronicle announced both paper's will end their Sunday print editions, and instead offer a larger weekend edition on Saturdays.
