= WNIO =

- Youngstown, Ohio; United States
- Broadcast area: Youngstown metropolitan area Mahoning Valley
- Frequency: 1390 kHz
- Branding: 1390 The Gambler

Programming
- Format: Sports
- Affiliations: Fox Sports Radio; VSiN Radio; Pittsburgh Steelers Radio Network; Ohio State Sports Network; Indianapolis Motor Speedway Radio Network

Ownership
- Owner: iHeartMedia, Inc.; (iHM Licenses, LLC)
- Sister stations: WAKZ, WBBG, WKBN, WMXY, WNCD

History
- First air date: September 7, 1939 (as WFMJ)
- Former call signs: WFMJ (1939–1990); WHOT (1990–1995); WRTK (1995–1999)
- Call sign meaning: Previously used on the former WNIO (1540 AM) in NIles, Ohio, now WYOH

Technical information
- Licensing authority: FCC
- Facility ID: 13669
- Class: B
- Power: 9,500 watts day 4,800 watts night
- Transmitter coordinates: 41°7′17″N 80°42′5″W (day); 40°59′11″N 80°35′54″W (night)

Links
- Public license information: Public file; LMS
- Webcast: Listen live (via iHeartRadio)
- Website: 1390thegambler.iheart.com

WNIO (1390 AM - branded 1390 The Gambler) — is an American radio station in Youngstown, Ohio with a sports talk radio format, serving as the Youngstown affiliate for Fox Sports Radio and VSiN Radio. WNIO also carries Ohio State University football and basketball, Pittsburgh Steelers football, and the Indianapolis 500 from the Indianapolis Motor Speedway Radio Network.

== History ==
The station was founded in 1939 as WFMJ by William F. Maag Jr. from whose initials the call letters were derived. Maag was also publisher of The Youngstown Vindicator. It was originally at 1420 kHz, and moved to 1450 kHz during the NARBA frequency shift on March 29, 1941. It moved to its present location 1390 kHz during the mid-1940s. During the 1940s and early 1950s WFMJ was an affiliate of the Blue Network and its successor ABC.

In 1948, Maag launched WFMJ-FM at 105.1 MHz; the FM station is now WQXK. On March 8, 1953, Maag started Youngstown's second television station WFMJ-TV on channel 73. The television station moved to its present location, channel 21, on August 7, 1954. WFMJ later aired a Top 40 music format.

The station ran an adult contemporary music format until 1989 when it flipped to adult standards for a short time. The AM station changed its callsign to WHOT on April 23, 1990, when it was sold by its original owners to the owner of WHOT-FM, and it used the historic call sign from the former Top 40 AM station that originally broadcast daytime only on 1570 kHz and later full-time on 1330 kHz. Four years later, it was sold to Connoisseur Communications, and it changed to WRTK on February 15, 1995, assuming a talk radio format as "Real Talk 1390."

In order to obtain Justice Department approval to purchase WQXK (FM) and WSOM (AM), Connoisseur was forced to sell WRTK as well as WBBG (FM). The stations were sold on February 23, 1998, to a subsidiary of Bain Gocom, the Boston venture capital company that was a major investor in WKBN-TV's former parent company. In a few months, Jacor Communications entered into a LMA with Bain Gocom for all of their radio stations in Youngstown and New Castle, including WRTK and WBBG. Combined with Jacor's existing station holdings in the area - and a merger with Clear Channel months later - ten stations were under the same operational and management control in the New Castle/Youngstown region.

The station became WNIO on November 1, 1999, after Clear Channel relocated WNIO's adult standards format and callsign from the daytime-only 1540 kHz facility in Niles, Ohio (that station would assume the WRTK calls and would be spun off to different owners in early 2001).

Clear Channel Communications purchased WNIO along with WNCD (which switched dial positions with WBBG in late 2000) and WAKZ from Bain in 2005, after it had dropped its petition on January 14, 2004, to purchase those three stations along with WICT due to FCC objections, and also included Clear Channel selling off their station clusters in New Castle and Johnstown to Forever Broadcasting, LLC.

From 2000 until 2010, WNIO also served as the flagship station for Mahoning Valley Scrappers minor league baseball.

In November 2010, Clear Channel announced that WNIO would drop its standards format in favor of Fox Sports Radio on December 27. The move will coincide with the displacement of the network from crosstown WANR 1570 AM in Warren, which switched back to its former classic hits format under the moniker "The Blizzard." This is one of two Standards stations changing their format in the Youngstown region. Cumulus owned WSOM AM 600 has flipped to News Talk on December 13 of 2010.

On September 7, 2020, WNIO rebranded as "1390 The Gambler", becoming the second iHeart sports station in Ohio to carry the "Gambler" name (after Cleveland market station WARF AM 1350). With the new branding, WNIO also added sports gambling oriented programming from the BetR Network, during the evenings. Fox Sports Radio however still comprises the bulk of the daily and weekend schedule.
