= Piedmont Television =

American broadcasting company

Piedmont Television was a broadcasting company in the United States that owned television stations in smaller markets. The company was based in Charlotte, North Carolina.

Piedmont was founded in 1996 as Grapevine Communications, and was originally based in Atlanta, Georgia. The company merged with GOCOM Communications in 1999; it inherited GOCOM's Charlotte headquarters and changed its name to GOCOM Holdings. In 2003, the name was again changed to Piedmont Television (the GOCOM name is now used by another company that owns WRSP-TV/WCCU in Springfield/Urbana, Illinois; that company is partially connected to Piedmont).

The company sold its stations to various owners in 2007.

== Former stations ==
- Stations are arranged in alphabetical order by state and city of license.

Stations owned by Piedmont Television
Media market	State	Station	Purchased	Sold	Notes
Huntsville	Alabama	WAAY-TV	1999	2007	
Anchorage	Alaska	KTBY	1997	2007	
Chico–Redding	California	KNVN	1999	2000	
Macon	Georgia	WGXA	1999	2007	
Savannah	Georgia	WJCL	1999	2007	
Monroe	Louisiana	KTVE	1996	2008	
Rochester	Minnesota	KAAL	1997	2001	
Joplin	Missouri	KODE-TV	1997	2002	
Springfield	Missouri	KSPR	1999	2007	
New Bern–Jacksonville	North Carolina	WFXI	1999	2007	
Greenville	North Carolina	WYDO	1999	2007	(Note: Satellite of WFXI.)
Youngstown	Ohio	WKBN-TV	1999	2007	
Youngstown	Ohio	WYFX-LP	1999	2007	
Mercer	Pennsylvania	WFXI-CA	1999	2007	(Note: Satellite of WYFX-LP.)
Midland–Odessa	Texas	KMID	1999	2000	
Casper	Wyoming	KTWO-TV	1998	2001	
Cheyenne	Wyoming	KKTU	1998	2001	(Note: Satellite of KTWO.)
