= Margaret S. Roberts =

American librarian and suffragist

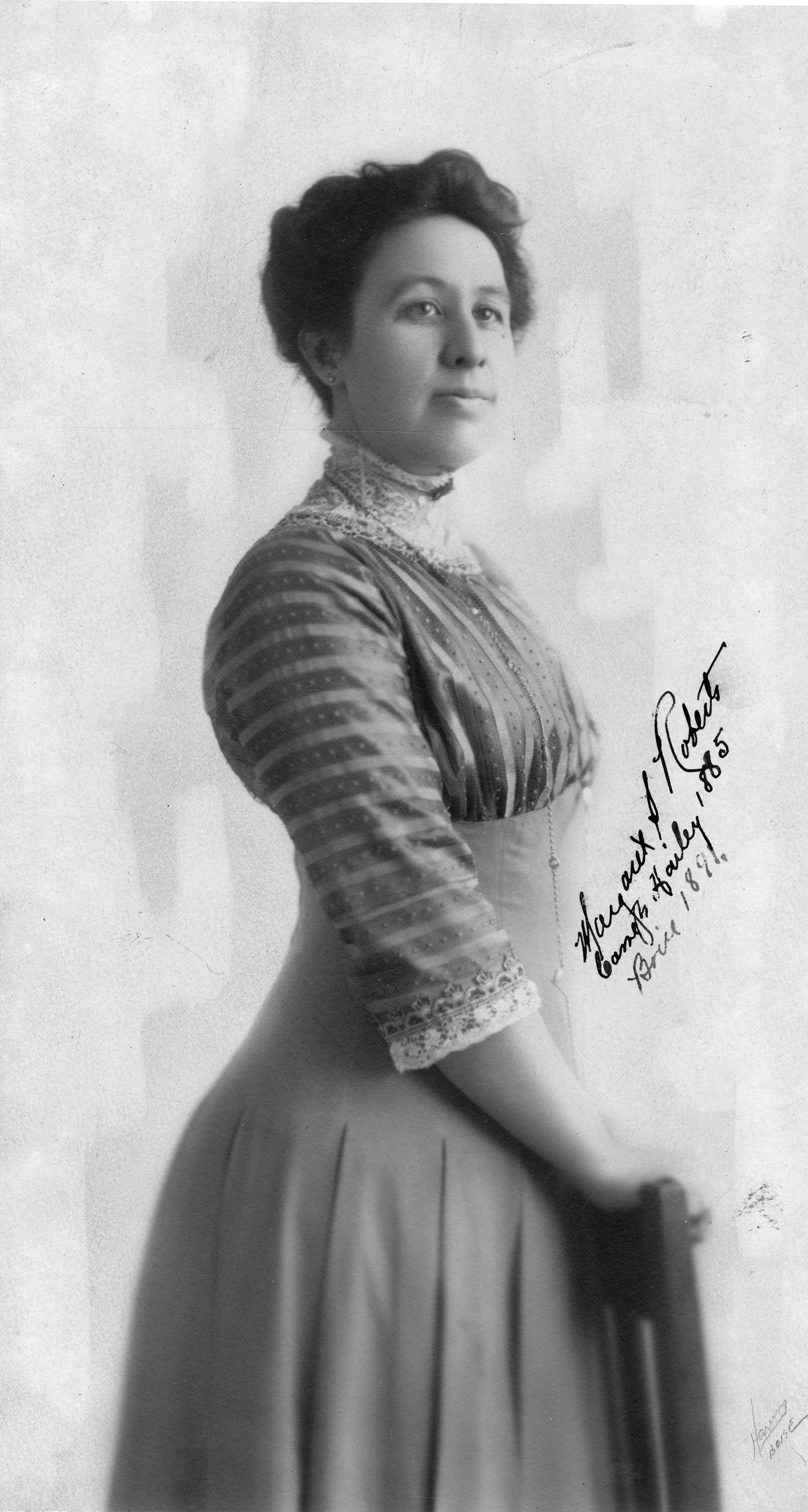
- Born: March 21, 1872
- Died: May 25, 1952 (aged 80); Boise
- Occupation: Librarian, historian

Margaret Stevenson Roberts (March 21, 1872 – May 25, 1952) was an American librarian known as Idaho's "Petticoat Governor" for her influence in advocating for women's suffrage. She was the main force behind the Idaho Free Traveling Library for over thirty years, encouraging reading and the establishment of public libraries.

== Early life and education ==
Margaret Stevenson Roberts was born March 21, 1872. She was the daughter of Civil War general George H. Roberts and his wife Julia. She graduated from Saint Mary-of-the-Wasatch Academy and Brownell Hall boarding school. She studied voice in Philadelphia.

Roberts was in her early twenties when her father moved the family from Nebraska to Hailey, Idaho to take a job as a lawyer for the rapidly expanding Union Pacific Railroad. After he was elected to serve as the Idaho Attorney General, the family moved to Boise. She was an active member of Boise's cultural life, including serving as a charter member and later president of the Boise Columbian Club. In 1893, Roberts helped establish Boise's first free kindergarten.

== Political efforts ==
Roberts was known as the "Petticoat Governor of Idaho" for her efforts supporting women's suffrage and other progressive reforms. She was passionate about the power of the ballot in protecting the rights of women and children. Roberts was part of the campaign for a woman suffrage amendment in Idaho, and after that effort met success in 1896, she was active in encouraging women from the western states to organize to work towards the goal of national women's suffrage. She was appointed by Governor James H. Brady to represent Idaho in the newly formed National Council of Women Voters; that organization would become the part of the League of Women Voters in 1919, and Roberts became the Chairman of the Idaho chapter. Roberts rejected the more radical tactics of suffragist activists from the Eastern U.S., saying western women would not support strategies that would anger their men. She frequently disagreed with Carrie Chapman Catt, who urged Roberts to put more pressure on Idaho's Senator William Borah to vote in favor of national women's suffrage. Roberts resigned her chair position in November 1920.

Active in the Idaho Republican Party, Roberts became the first woman on the executive committee of the state's party in May 1919. She also served as Idaho's representative in the women's division of the Republican National Committee, joining a group called the "Council of One Hundred," focused on encouraging full political participation for women. Unlike other "club women" in her social circles, she was interested in holding office and ran for several elected offices between 1918 and 1938. She campaigned for the position of Idaho Secretary of State in 1922, but was defeated at the state Republican convention. Roberts faced multiple barriers to gaining office, including her gender, a lack of financial resources as a single woman, and her duty to care for her aging parents.

She was appointed the head of wartime operations for the Idaho State Historical Society in 1943.

== Work in librarianship ==
For many years, Roberts was a librarian for the Idaho Free Traveling Library, which would later become the Idaho State Library. She traveled to communities throughout Idaho, encouraging reading and the establishment of local public libraries. She was employed at the traveling library for over thirty years, beginning with its inception in 1898, and often "laughingly referred to the library as 'my child'." The trips she made through the state were possible because of an annual pass provided to all Idaho state officials by the Union Pacific. Roberts built the library by buying books she thought would "engender a love of reading." She retired in 1933 but returned to work with the traveling library in 1947, continuing that work until her death in 1952.

Roberts called the first meeting of the Idaho State Library Association (later the Idaho Library Association) in December 1915.

== Death and recognition ==
Roberts died in Boise on May 25, 1952.

In 2020, USA Today named Roberts one of the ten most influential women in the history of Idaho as part of its "Woman of the Century" series.
