= WKBN (AM) =

- Youngstown, Ohio; United States
- Broadcast area: Youngstown metropolitan area
- Frequency: 570 kHz
- Branding: Newsradio 570 WKBN

Programming
- Format: News/Talk
- Network: ABC News Radio
- Affiliations: Compass Media Networks; Premiere Networks; Cleveland Guardians Radio Network; Mahoning Valley Scrappers; WKBN-TV (news and weather updates)

Ownership
- Owner: iHeartMedia, Inc.; (iHM Licenses, LLC)
- Sister stations: WAKZ; WBBG; WMXY; WNCD; WNIO

History
- First air date: September 26, 1926

Technical information
- Licensing authority: FCC
- Facility ID: 70519
- Class: B
- Power: 5,000 watts
- Transmitter coordinates: 40°59′06″N 80°36′00″W

Links
- Public license information: Public file; LMS
- Webcast: Listen live (via iHeartRadio)
- Website: 570wkbn.iheart.com

WKBN (570 kHz) is a commercial AM radio station in Youngstown, Ohio. It has a news/talk format and is owned by iHeartMedia, Inc. The studios and offices are on South Avenue in Youngstown.

WKBN is powered at 5,000 watts from a six-tower array on East Western Reserve and Beard roads in Poland, Ohio. By day, it operates a non-directional signal from a single tower. Due to its location near the bottom of the AM dial, as well as its transmitter power, its daytime signal can be heard at city-grade strength from Cleveland to Pittsburgh, and provides at least secondary coverage to Erie, Pennsylvania, most of the Northern Panhandle of West Virginia, much of north-central Ohio and even a section of Southern Ontario. At night, power is fed to all six towers in a directional pattern to protect other stations on 570 AM, concentrating the signal in Youngstown and Pittsburgh.

== History ==
=== Early years ===
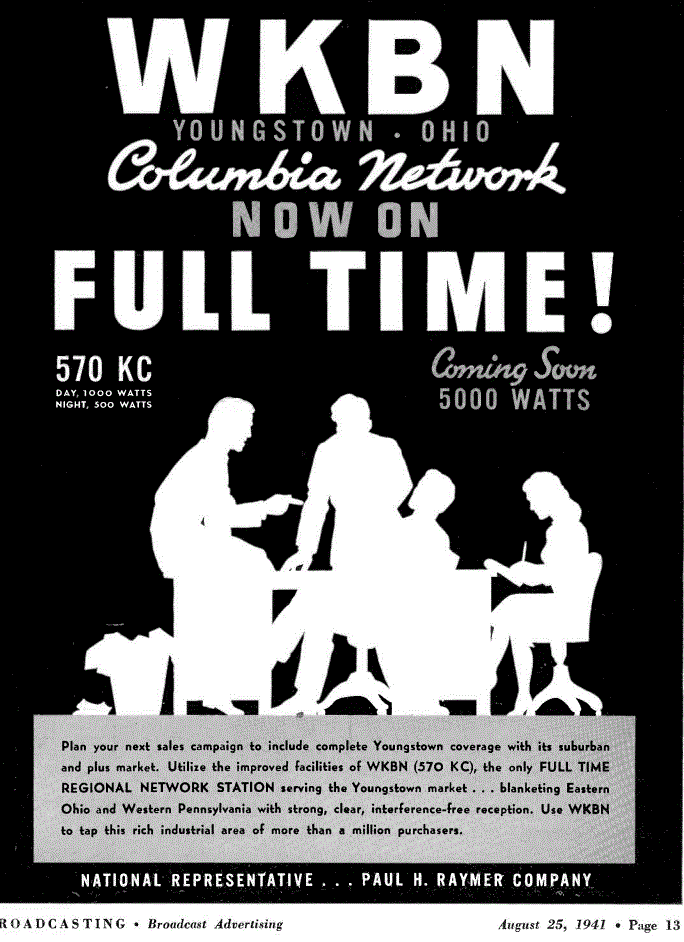
In 1941, the station began fulltime operation on 570 kHz.

WKBN was first authorized to the Radio Electric Service Co. (W. P. Williamson, Jr.) (1900–1996) at 26 Auburndale Avenue. It is Youngstown's oldest continuing operating radio station, signing on the air on September 26, 1926. It originally broadcast on 1400 kHz at 50 watts. The call letters was randomly assigned from a sequential roster of available call signs. The studios were in the basement of Williamson's home, but by the following year operations had moved to studios in the YMCA Building in downtown Youngstown. The license was later held by the WKBN Broadcasting Corporation.

Following the establishment of the Federal Radio Commission (FRC), stations were initially issued a series of temporary authorizations starting on May 3, 1927. In addition, they were informed that if they wanted to continue operating, they needed to file a formal license application by January 15, 1928, as the first step in determining whether they met the new "public interest, convenience, or necessity" standard. On May 25, 1928, the FRC issued General Order 32, which notified 164 stations, including WKBN, that "From an examination of your application for future license it does not find that public interest, convenience, or necessity would be served by granting it." However, the station successfully convinced the commission that it should remain licensed. As part of the proceedings, a second Youngstown station, WMBW, was consolidated with WKBN.

On November 11, 1928, the FRC implemented a major reallocation of station transmitting frequencies, as part of a reorganization resulting from its implementation of General Order 40. WKBN was assigned to 1430 kHz, sharing this frequency with WMBS. In 1941, WKBN moved to fulltime operation on 570 kHz, where it remains today.

=== CBS programming ===
Shortly after WKBN's launch, the station became a charter affiliate of the newly formed CBS Radio Network, a partnership that would last until the end of the century. WKBN carried CBS's schedule of dramas, comedies, news, sports, soap operas, game shows and big band broadcasts during the "Golden Age of Radio". For many years, WKBN was one of only two radio stations licensed to Youngstown. (WFMJ, now WNIO, signed on in 1939.) The station also broadcast some shows on Radio Luxembourg to American troops in Europe during World War II.

On February 8, 1943, Alan Freed started his early radio career on WKBN. He later went on to a career as a noted rock and roll disc jockey.

=== MOR and talk ===
As network programming moved to TV from radio in the 1950s, WKBN switched from CBS shows to a middle of the road format of popular music, news, sports and talk. As listeners increasingly tuned to FM for music, WKBN added more talk programming. By the 1990s, the music shows had ended as WKBN transitioned to all talk, with frequent news updates and sports coverage.

=== FM and TV stations ===
Warren Williamson started 98.9 WKBN-FM in 1948. At first, it simulcast the same programming as the AM station. In the 1960s, 1970s and 1980s, it carried an automated beautiful music format. The FM station is now adult contemporary WMXY.

He also started WKBN-TV in 1953, which became a predominantly CBS-TV affiliate in part due to the AM station's long history with the radio network. WKBN-TV to this day has retained the CBS-TV affiliation. In 1997, the TV station was sold to Gocom, while WKBN-AM-FM would later be sold to a different owner.

=== Changes in ownership ===
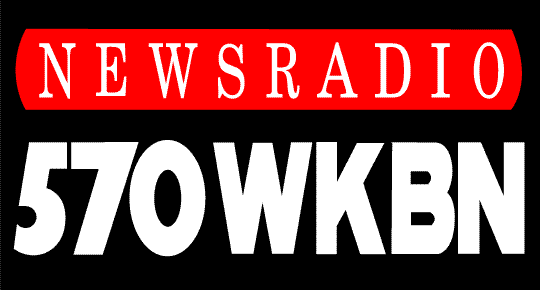
Previous logo

On January 22, 1999, the Williamson family sold WKBN and WKBN-FM to Jacor Communications, earning a handsome return on their investment of 73 years prior. WKBN had been one of the few stations in a market of Youngstown's size that was still under family ownership.

Jacob, however, did not own the stations very long. Only three months later, on April 29, 1999, Clear Channel Communications completed its $6.5 billion purchase of Jacor and its 454 stations, including WKBN and WKBN-FM. In September 2014, Clear Channel Communications became iHeartMedia, Inc.

== Programming ==
WKBN has one local talk show on weekdays, Ron Verb during afternoon drive time. The rest of the weekday schedule is made up of nationally syndicated conservative talk shows, mostly from co-owned Premiere Networks: The Sean Hannity Show, The Clay Travis and Buck Sexton Show, The Michael DelGiorno Show, Armstrong & Getty, The Joe Pags Show, Coast to Coast AM with George Noory and This Morning, America's First News with Gordon Deal. Most hours begin with world and national news from ABC News Radio.

On weekends, specialty programs on money, health, home improvement, technology, cars, veterans, real estate and the outdoors are heard, as well as repeats of weekday shows. Weekend syndicated shows include At Home with Gary Sullivan, Rich DeMuro on Tech, The Weekend with Michael Brown, Somewhere in Time with Art Bell and Sunday Night with Bill Cunningham. Some weekend hours are paid brokered programming. The station also carries Cleveland Guardians baseball games and is the flagship station for Youngstown State Penguins football and basketball.

== Former staff members ==
- Jack Berch began his radio career at WKBN. He went on to have The Jack Berch Show, which ran at various times on four networks (1935–1954).
- Alan Freed began his radio career at WKST in New Castle, Pennsylvania. before moving on to WKBN in Youngstown, Ohio. He went on to become a disc jockey on stations such as 850 WJW Cleveland and 1010 WINS New York City. Leo Mintz, owner of Record Rendezvous and sponsor of the first Moondog Coronation Ball in Cleveland, Ohio, on March 21, 1952, is credited with calling young people's popular music by the term "Rock and Roll".
- Dan Rivers was a veteran morning host on WKBN. He announced he'd be leaving the station in November 2024.
