= 2009 Gatorade Duels =

Qualifying races for the 2009 Daytona 500

The 2009 Gatorade Duels were a pair of 150 miles (240 km) qualifying races for the 2009 Daytona 500, and were held on February 12, 2009, at the 2.5 miles (4.0 km) Daytona International Speedway in Daytona Beach, Florida.

The races set the field for the 51st running of "The Great American Race", and are the only races in the NASCAR Sprint Cup that qualifies drivers and their teams for a points-paying race. The top 35 drivers from the previous season automatically made "The Great American Race" regardless of position. Race one sets the field for spaces on the inside of the pole sitter (in this case, Martin Truex Jr.), which is locked in via the traditional two-lap process on February 8, while race two sets the field on the outside behind other front row driver. The field for race one consisted of the cars that qualified in odd-numbered positions (1st, 3rd, 5th, 7th, etc.) and race two conversely saw cars that qualified in even-numbered positions (2nd, 4th, 6th, 8th, etc.). All starting positions for the 500 were determined by the duels, except for the front row which is locked in after qualifying. In the races, the top two finishers not in the Top 35 from the previous season automatically qualify. The remaining cars are locked in via qualifying speeds, point owners exemptions and (if needed) a past champion's provisional going to the most recent past champion.

For the third consecutive year, a driver each from Joe Gibbs Racing and Hendrick Motorsports won the Duels.

Both races had spectacular finishes. In the first duel, Jeff Gordon beat out Tony Stewart, Joey Logano, Jimmie Johnson and Aric Almirola. That group was within .40 of a second within each other on the last lap. Race two had Kyle Busch holding off Mark Martin and Brian Vickers by .26 of a second over Martin and .264 of Vickers.

== Results ==
Top ten finishers
Race #1					Race #2				
Finish	Car #	Driver	Team	Make	Finish	Car #	Driver	Team	Make
1	24	Jeff Gordon	Hendrick Motorsports	Chevrolet	1	18	Kyle Busch	Joe Gibbs Racing	Toyota
2	14	**Tony Stewart**	Stewart–Haas Racing	Chevrolet	2	5	Mark Martin	Hendrick Motorsports	Chevrolet
3	48	Jimmie Johnson	Hendrick Motorsports	Chevrolet	3	83	Brian Vickers	Team Red Bull	Toyota
4	20	Joey Logano	Joe Gibbs Racing	Toyota	4	42	Juan Pablo Montoya	Earnhardt Ganassi Racing	Chevrolet
5	8	Aric Almirola	Earnhardt Ganassi Racing	Chevrolet	5	11	Denny Hamlin	Joe Gibbs Racing	Toyota
6	2	Kurt Busch	Penske Championship Racing	Dodge	6	96	Bobby Labonte	Hall of Fame Racing	Ford
7	9	Kasey Kahne	Richard Petty Motorsports	Dodge	7	88	Dale Earnhardt Jr.	Hendrick Motorsports	Chevrolet
8	36	**Scott Riggs**	Tommy Baldwin Racing	Toyota	8	99	Carl Edwards	Roush Fenway Racing	Ford
9	98	Paul Menard	Yates Racing	Ford	9	41	**Jeremy Mayfield**	Jeremy Mayfield Racing	Toyota
10	26	Jamie McMurray	Roush Fenway Racing	Ford	10	44	**A. J. Allmendinger**	Petty Motorsports	Dodge

Those in boldface were qualified as top two finishers not in 2008 owner points top 35 exemptions.
Also making race on speed: Bill Elliott (#21), Regan Smith (#78), Travis Kvapil (#28).
Making race using champions provisional: Terry Labonte (#66).

== Did not qualify ==
Failed to make race
Race 1	Race 2
Joe Nemechek (#87)	Mike Wallace (#71)
Brad Keselowski (#09)	Kelly Bires (#51)
Mike Skinner (#23).	Derrike Cope (#75)
Carl Long (#46)	Norm Benning (#57)
Kirk Shelmerdine (#27)	Mike Garvey (#73)
Tony Raines (#37)	Geoffrey Bodine (#64)
	Boris Said (#08)
