= WBBG =

Niles, Ohio; United States
- Broadcast area: Youngstown, Ohio
- Frequency: 106.1 MHz (HD Radio)
- Branding: 106.1 the Bull

Programming
- Format: Country music
- Affiliations: Premiere Networks; Ohio State Sports Network

Ownership
- Owner: iHeartMedia, Inc.; (iHM Licenses, LLC)
- Sister stations: WAKZ, WKBN, WMXY, WNCD, WNIO

History
- First air date: May 15, 1988
- Former call signs: WNCD (1988–2000)
- Call sign meaning: former "BiG" branding

Technical information
- Facility ID: 73309
- Class: A
- ERP: 3,000 watts
- HAAT: 100 meters (330 ft)
- Transmitter coordinates: 41.264°N 80.760°W

Links
- Webcast: Listen live (via iHeartRadio)
- Website: 1061thebullyoungstown.iheart.com

WBBG (106.1 FM) is a commercial radio station in Youngstown, Ohio, market with a country music format. The station is licensed to Niles, Ohio. WBBG is also a local affiliate for the Ohio State Sports Network football games.

The station first signed on the air as WNCD, licensed on October 29, 1987 (it signed back on May 15, 1988). It changed its call sign to WBBG on October 30, 2000, after the two stations swapped signals on August 30, 2000.

The WBBG call letters were used on a Cleveland AM station (at 1260-AM) from 1978 until 1987; the current WBBG picked them up on June 27, 1988, also as a reflection of its former AM sister station, WBBW 1240 kHz.

In January 2016, WBBG shifted their format to classic hits, branded as "Big 106".

On April 25, 2016, WBBG dropped the classic hits and flipped to country as "106.1 The Bull".
