= WAKZ =

- Sharpsville, Pennsylvania; United States
- Broadcast area: Youngstown, Ohio
- Frequency: 95.9 MHz (HD Radio)
- Branding: Real 95.9

Programming
- Format: Mainstream urban
- Affiliations: Premiere Networks

Ownership
- Owner: iHeartMedia, Inc.; (iHM Licenses, LLC)
- Sister stations: WBBG; WKBN; WMXY; WNCD; WNIO

History
- First air date: December 28, 1976 (as WFAR-FM)
- Former call signs: WFAR-FM (1976–1980); WGBZ (1980–1982); WMGZ-FM (1982–1989); WOJY-FM (1989–1991); WAXF (1991–1992); WHTX (1992–1994); WRKU (1994–1996); WWSY (1996–1998); WTNX (1998–2001)
- Call sign meaning: refers to former "Kiss FM" branding

Technical information
- Licensing authority: FCC
- Facility ID: 74468
- Class: A
- ERP: 6,000 watts
- HAAT: 100 meters (330 ft)
- Transmitter coordinates: 41°13′5″N 80°33′43″W

Links
- Public license information: Public file; LMS
- Webcast: Listen live (via iHeartRadio)
- Website: real959.iheart.com

WAKZ (95.9 FM, "Real 95.9") is a radio station licensed to Sharpsville, Pennsylvania, and serving Youngstown, Ohio. The station is owned by iHeartMedia, Inc. The station airs a mainstream urban radio format. Prior to July 2, 2020, WAKZ broadcast a contemporary hit radio format as "95.9 Kiss FM".
