= WNCD =

Radio station in Youngstown, Ohio

Youngstown, Ohio; United States
- Broadcast area: Youngstown, Ohio
- Frequency: 93.3 MHz (HD Radio)
- Branding: 93.3 The Wolf

Programming
- Format: Mainstream rock

Ownership
- Owner: iHeartMedia, Inc.; (iHM Licenses, LLC)
- Sister stations: WAKZ, WBBG, WKBN, WMXY, WNIO

History
- First air date: June 1959
- Former call signs: WQOD-FM (1959–1989); WBBG (1989–2000)
- Call sign meaning: Compact Disk

Technical information
- Licensing authority: FCC
- Facility ID: 13668
- Class: B
- ERP: 50,000 watts
- HAAT: 85 meters (279 ft)
- Transmitter coordinates: 41.081°N 80.648°W

Links
- Public license information: Public file; LMS
- Webcast: Listen live (via iHeartRadio)
- Website: 933fmthewolf.iheart.com

WNCD (93.3 FM) is a commercial radio station serving Youngstown, Ohio, owned by iHeartMedia, Inc. and broadcasting a mainstream rock format. Its signal covers Youngstown, Warren, and New Castle, PA, and at times even reaches Erie and New Kensington, Pennsylvania (Pittsburgh market). However, near Meadville and points east, a station from Jamestown, New York starts to interfere with WNCD's signal. WNCD goes by the nickname "93.3 The Wolf".

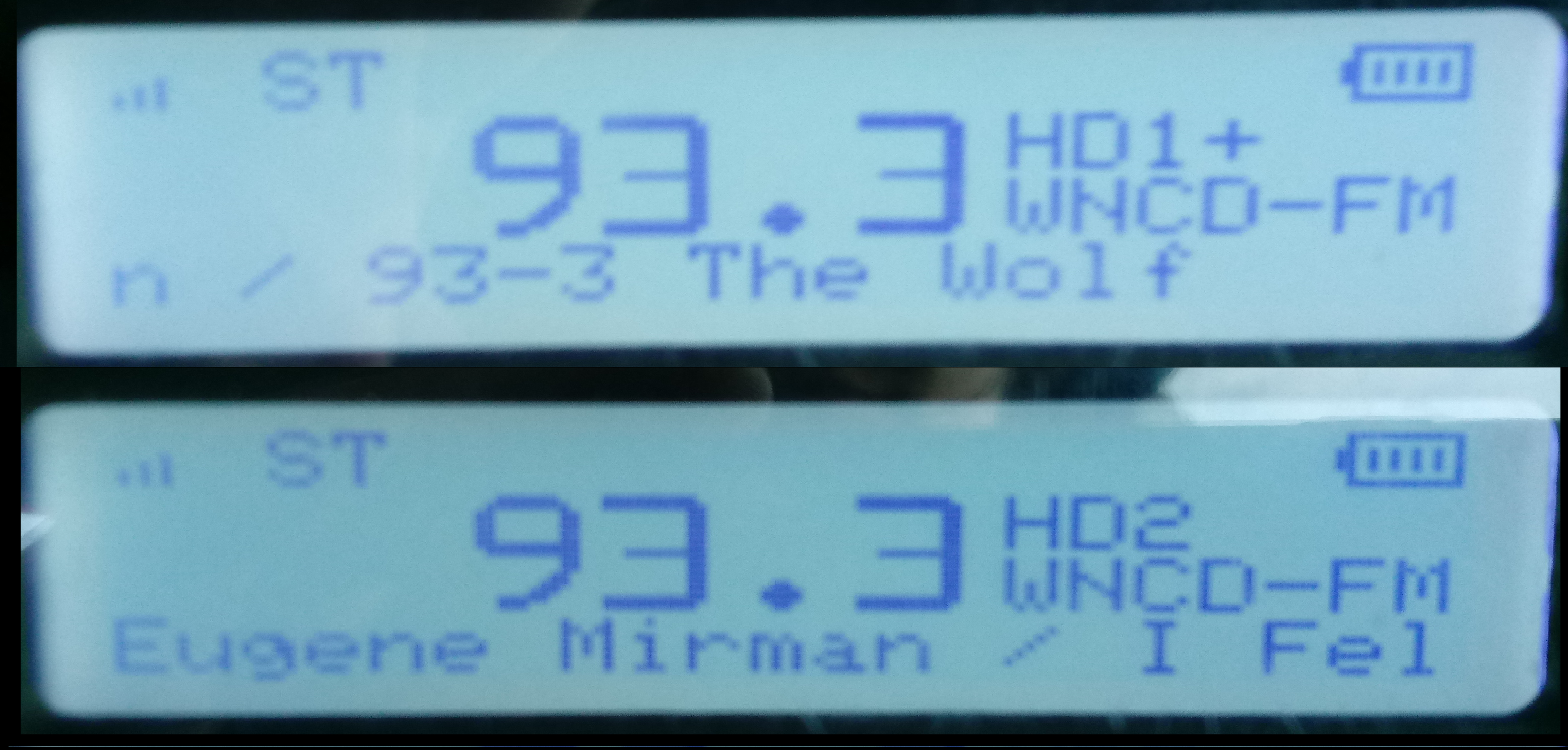
WNCD's HD Radio Channels on a SPARC Radio with PSD and EAS.

WNCD's morning programming comes from Rover's Morning Glory, from 6 am to 10 am. Until May 2007, the station's playlist featured an active rock format, playing classic rock from artists such as Led Zeppelin, Ozzy Osbourne, Guns N' Roses, AC/DC and Metallica, while playing new rock from bands like Nickelback, Mudvayne, Breaking Benjamin, Staind, Disturbed, Tool, Chevelle, Three Days Grace, Linkin Park, Puddle of Mudd and Seether. Since 2007, WNCD has played more classic rock than new rock and is considered a Mainstream Rock Station. The station primarily competes with WYFM for listeners. The station secondarily competes with WONE from Akron, WRQK from Canton, WNCX and WMMS from Cleveland, and WDVE and WXDX from Pittsburgh.

== History ==
The original 93.3 frequency launched in June 1959 as WQOD-FM. The station first had a diversified format and later beautiful music in the 1970s and early-1980s. The station flipped to an adult contemporary music format in 1983 under the branding name "FM 93". In June 1988, WQOD flipped its format to oldies under the branding "Oldies 93", and its call letters changed to WBBG-FM several months afterward. On August 30, 2000, both WBBG and WNCD swapped their frequencies, formats, and call letters.

Prior to the switchover, WNCD was known as "CD106 the Wolf", located at 106.1 on the FM dial and was licensed to nearby Niles, Ohio. At one time, WNCD simulcast its signal on WLLF 96.7 FM in Mercer, Pennsylvania, aiming for listeners in the eastern part of the Youngstown market into Western Pennsylvania. WLLF still carries the "Wolf"-derived calls today, despite new ownership and numerous format changes.

After coming under common ownership with sister FM radio station WBBG, WNCD traded for the much stronger 93.3 frequency. In the past, the station has been branded as "CD 93.3 The Wolf" and "93.3 NCD", the latter name being derived from fellow iHeartMedia Mainstream rock station WDVE in Pittsburgh which goes by the name "102.5 DVE".

== Back to the Wolf ==
In May 2007, WNCD switched branding again, going back to 93.3 The Wolf from the previous 93.3 NCD with an updated "Wolf" mascot in the logo.

Since 2024, the station has been the Youngstown affiliate for the Cleveland Browns Radio Network.
