= Tribune Chronicle =

American daily morning newspaper in Ohio

- Type: Daily newspaper
- Format: Broadsheet
- Owner: Ogden Newspapers Inc.
- Editor: Ed Puskas
- General manager: Ted Snyder
- Founded: 1812, as the Trump of Fame
- Headquarters: 240 Franklin Street SE; Warren, Ohio 44482 United States
- Circulation: 35,000 Daily; 42,000 Sunday (as of 2002)
- OCLC number: 18047053
- Website: tribtoday.com

The Tribune Chronicle is a daily morning newspaper serving Warren, Ohio and the Mahoning Valley area of the United States. The newspaper claims to be the second oldest in the U.S. state of Ohio. The Trib, as the newspaper is nicknamed by readers and in other local media, is owned by Ogden Newspapers Inc. of Wheeling, West Virginia. The newspaper is published by Ted Snyder, and its editor is Ed Puskas. In 2008, USA Today reported daily circulation of 35,471 for the Tribune Chronicle.

== History ==
In June 1812, the Trump of Fame commenced publishing as the first newspaper in what had been the Connecticut Western Reserve. In 1816, this paper became known as the Western Reserve Chronicle, forerunner to the modern Tribune Chronicle. On April 14, 1883, the Chronicle commenced daily publication. Prior to this, the newspaper had been a weekly, publishing on Tuesdays.

In 1924, Zell Hart Deming bought the Chronicle and merged it with The Warren Tribune to create The Warren Tribune Chronicle. Upon her death, Deming passed on the paper to her daughter Helen Hart Hurlbert who would later hand ownership over to her daughter Zell Draz.

In 1977, the newspaper changed to its present name, and began publishing on Sundays. On November 2, 1994, the paper launched its website, the first in the Mahoning Valley. The newspaper also became the first morning newspaper in Trumbull County, on July 6, 1999. In 2014, the paper launched its digital edition.

== Expansion ==
On August 16, 2019, The Vindicator and Tribune Chronicle reached an agreement for the Tribune Chronicle to acquire The Vindicator’s subscription list, The Vindicator masthead and the Vindy.com domain, according to The Vindicator former general manager Mark Brown. As of September 1, 2019 Tribune Chronicle now publishes The Vindicator for the Mahoning County region. Trumbull County residents will remain getting the paper as Tribune Chronicle

In March 2024, the Tribune Chronicle and The Vindicator announced both paper's will end their Sunday print editions, and instead offer a larger weekend edition on Saturdays. In August 2025, both papers announced they will switch from carrier to postal delivery.
