= WMXY =

Adult contemporary radio station in Ohio, US

- Youngstown, Ohio; United States
- Broadcast area: Youngstown metropolitan area
- Frequency: 98.9 MHz (HD Radio)
- Branding: Mix 98.9

Programming
- Format: Adult contemporary
- Subchannels: HD2: Elton John Radio
- Affiliations: Premium Choice; Premiere Networks; WKBN-TV (news and weather updates)

Ownership
- Owner: iHeartMedia, Inc.; (iHM Licenses, LLC)
- Sister stations: WAKZ; WBBG; WKBN; WNCD; WNIO

History
- First air date: August 26, 1947
- Former call signs: WKBN-FM (1947–1999)
- Call sign meaning: "Mix Youngstown"

Technical information
- Licensing authority: FCC
- Facility ID: 73514
- Class: B
- ERP: 5,900 watts
- HAAT: 418 meters (1,371 ft)
- Transmitter coordinates: 41.057°N 80.645°W

Links
- Public license information: Public file; LMS
- Webcast: Listen live (via iHeartRadio); HD2: Listen live (via iHeartRadio)
- Website: mix989.iheart.com

WMXY (98.9 FM "Mix 98.9") is a commercial radio station in Youngstown, Ohio. It broadcasts a mainstream adult contemporary radio format and switches to all-Christmas music for much of November and December. WMXY is owned by iHeartMedia, Inc. It is the Youngstown network affiliate for the Delilah syndicated music and call-in show in the evening, and carries the Ellen K Weekend Show Saturdays and Casey Kasem's classic American Top 40 on Sundays.

WMXY has an effective radiated power (ERP) of 5,900 watts. The transmitter is off South Avenue in Boardman, Ohio. WMXY broadcasts in the HD Radio hybrid format. The HD-2 digital subchannel carries all-Elton John music branded as "Elton John Radio."

== History ==
=== WKBN-FM ===
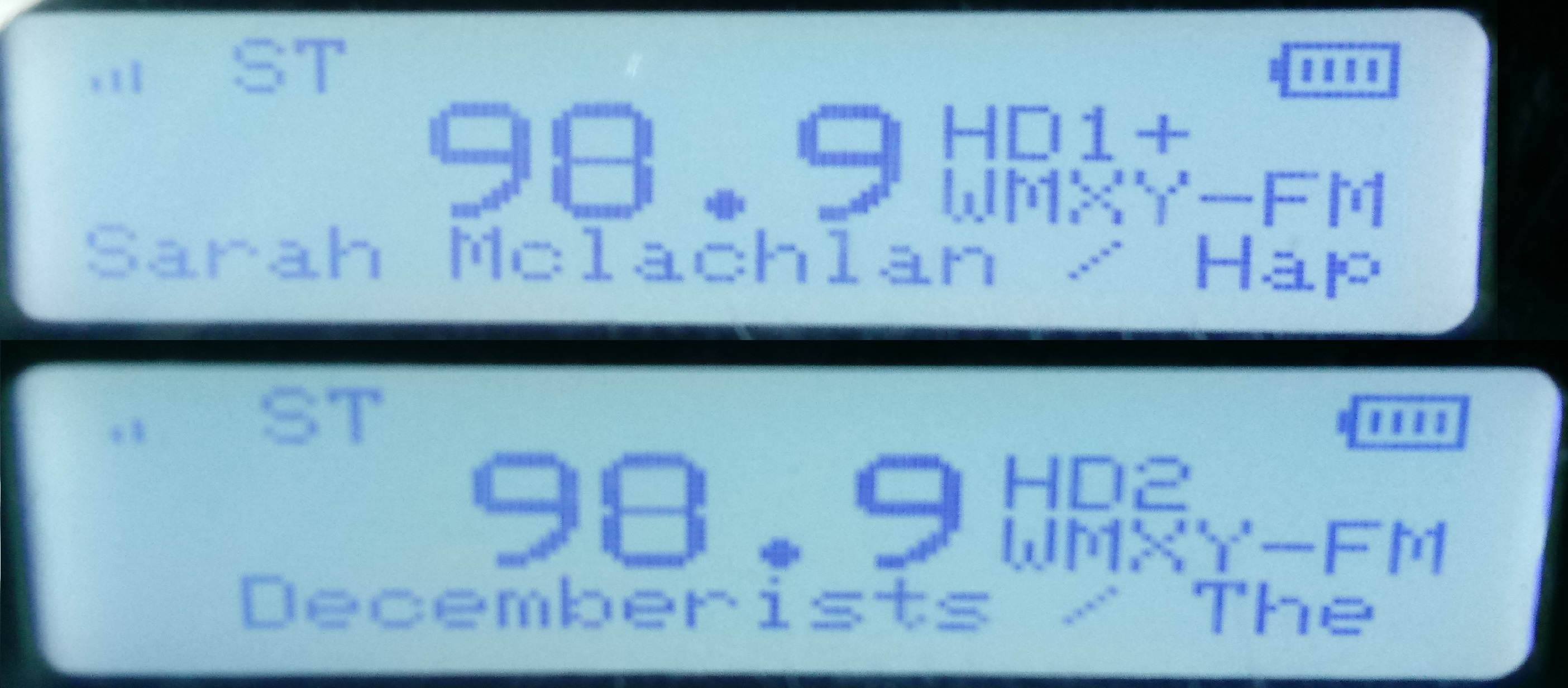
WMXY's HD Radio Channels on a SPARC Radio with PSD.

The station first signed on the air on August 26, 1947. It began as WKBN-FM, a sister station to WKBN (AM 570), and six years later, would be joined by WKBN-TV. The two radio stations are co-owned to this day, although the TV station was spun off to a different owner in 1997. In the station's earliest years, WKBN-FM and WKBN would mostly simulcast. The two stations were affiliated with the CBS Radio Network, carrying CBS's schedule of dramas, comedies, news, sports and other network programming.

Eventually, as network programming moved from radio to television, WKBN-AM-FM switched to a middle of the road format of popular music, news, sports and talk in the 1950s. By the mid-1960s, the Federal Communications Commission began requiring FM stations to carry different programming from their AM stations for most of the day.

WKBN-FM became a primarily automated listening outlet. It aired quarter hour sweeps of instrumental covers of popular hits, as well as Broadway and Hollywood show tunes. The station later began calling itself "Stereo 99" after installing FM stereo equipment. This format increased popularity in the Youngstown region. Like many easy listening stations nationwide, its profitability rose from the late 1960s through the mid-1980s.

=== WMXY ===
By the mid-1980s, the audience for easy listening was aging while advertisers usually seek young to middle aged customers. WKBN-FM switched from its easy listening format to soft adult contemporary on March 20, 1989. Most of the dayparts remained automated, however, and the "Stereo 99" moniker remained.

By the end of the 20th century, the station needed to further brighten up its image and sound more youthful. WKBN-FM changed its call sign to WMXY and adopted the slogan "Mix 98.9", with a hot adult contemporary format. In early 2012, WMXY adjusted its music mix back to mainstream AC, using Clear Channel's Premium Choice AC music logs and continuing to carry Delilah at night.
