= McKinley Birthplace Memorial gold dollar =

Commemorative gold coin featuring President McKinley

McKinley Birthplace Memorial dollar
- United States
- Value: 1 U.S. dollar
- Mass: 1.7432 g
- Diameter: 15 mm
- Edge: Reeded
- Composition: 90% gold; 10% copper
- Gold: 0.04837 troy oz
- Years of minting: 1916–17
- Mintage: 1916: 20,000 pieces plus 26 for the Assay Commission; 1917: 10,000 plus 14 for the Assay Commission
- Mint marks: None. All pieces struck at Philadelphia Mint without mint mark.

Obverse
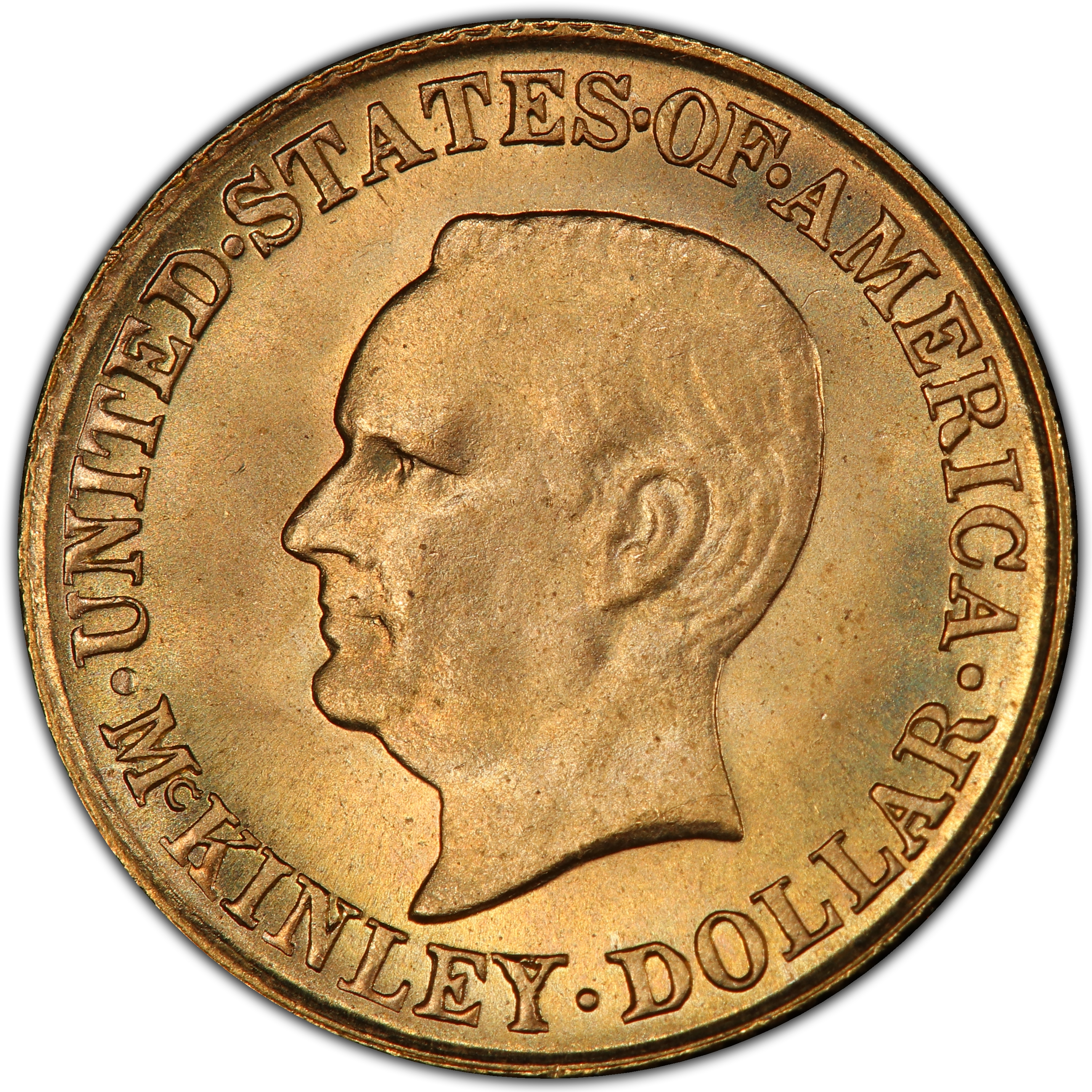
- Design: William McKinley
- Designer: Charles E. Barber
- Design date: 1916

Reverse
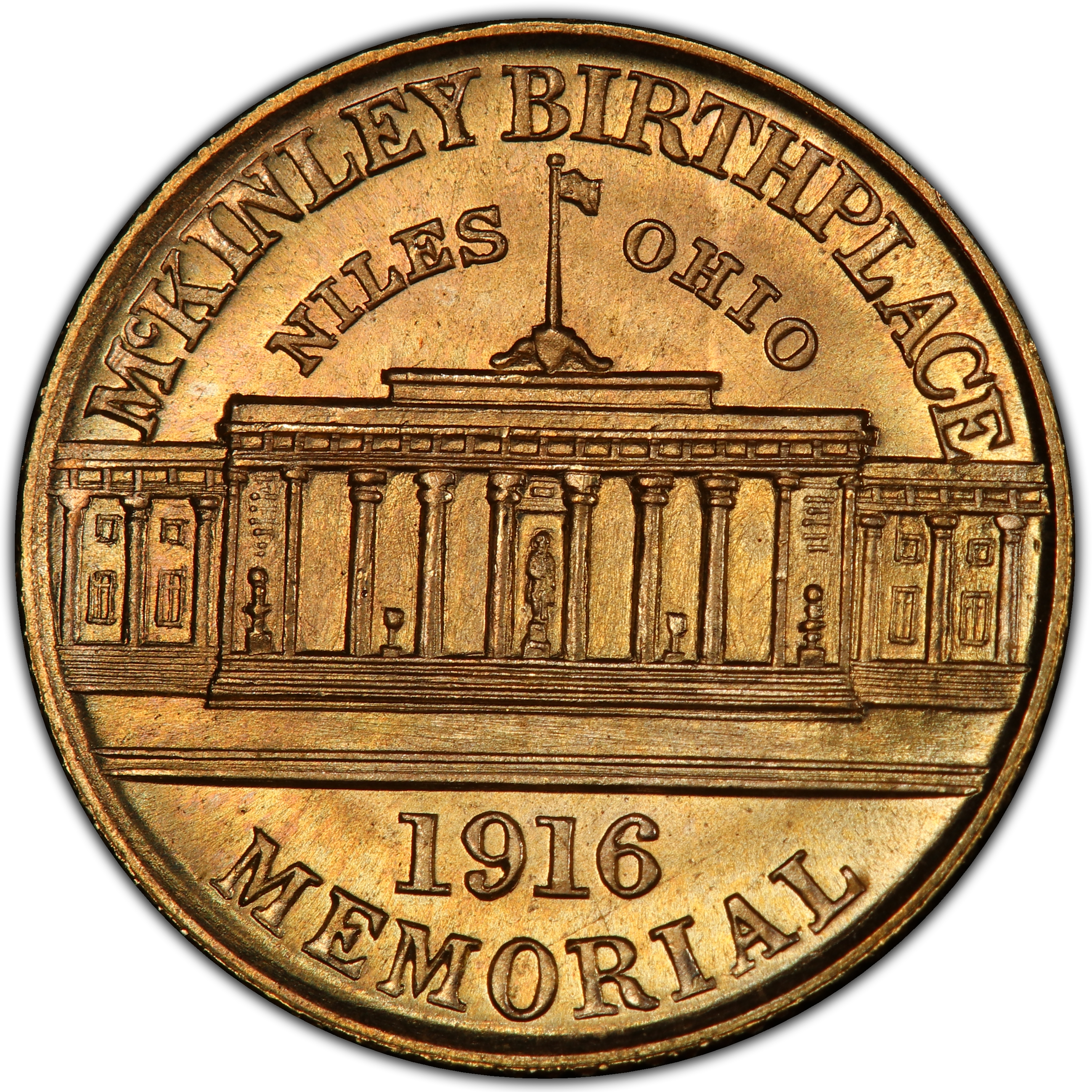
- Design: National McKinley Birthplace Memorial
- Designer: George T. Morgan
- Design date: 1916

The McKinley Birthplace Memorial gold dollar was a commemorative coin struck by the United States Bureau of the Mint in 1916 and 1917, depicting the 25th President of the United States, William McKinley. The coin's obverse was designed by Charles E. Barber, Chief Engraver of the Mint, and the reverse by his assistant, George T. Morgan. As McKinley had appeared on a version of the 1903-dated Louisiana Purchase Exposition dollar, the 1916 release made him the first person to appear on two issues of U.S. coins.

The coins were to be sold at a premium to finance the National McKinley Birthplace Memorial at Niles, Ohio, and were vended by the group constructing it. The issue was originally proposed as a silver dollar; this was changed when it was realized it would not be appropriate to honor a president who had supported the gold standard with such a piece. The coins were poorly promoted, and did not sell well. Despite an authorized mintage of 100,000, only about 30,000 were minted. Of these, 20,000 were sold, many of these at a reduced price to Texas coin dealer B. Max Mehl. The remaining 10,000 pieces were returned to the Mint for melting.

== Background ==
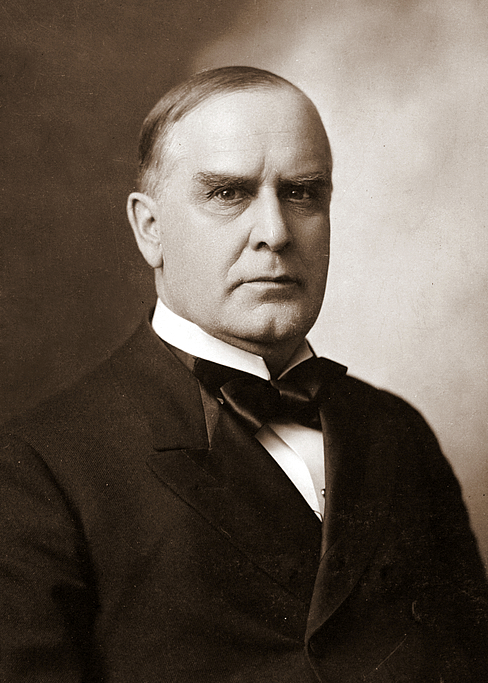
William McKinley

William McKinley was born in Niles, Ohio, in 1843. He left college to work as a teacher, and enlisted in the Union Army when the American Civil War broke out in 1861. He served throughout the war, ending it as a brevet major. Afterwards, he attended law school and was admitted to the bar. He settled in Canton, Ohio, and after practicing there, was elected to Congress in 1876. In 1890, he was defeated for re-election, but was elected governor the following year, serving two two-year terms.

With the aid of his close adviser Mark Hanna, he secured the Republican nomination for president in 1896, amid a deep economic depression. He defeated his Democratic rival, William Jennings Bryan, after a front porch campaign in which he advocated "sound money", that is, the gold standard unless modified by international agreement. This contrasted to "free silver", pushed by Bryan in his campaign.

McKinley was president during the Spanish–American War of 1898, in which the U.S. victory was quick and decisive. As part of the peace settlement, Spain turned over to the United States its overseas colonies of Puerto Rico, Guam, and the Philippines. With the nation prosperous, McKinley defeated Bryan again in the 1900 presidential election. President McKinley was assassinated by Leon Czolgosz in September 1901, and was succeeded by Vice President Theodore Roosevelt.

In the years after McKinley's death, several memorials were built to him, including a large structure housing his remains at Canton. Another memorial was built at his birthplace in Niles under the auspices of the National McKinley Birthplace Memorial Association (the Association). Designed by the firm of McKim, Mead, and White, the Greek Classic memorial was built of Georgia marble and was dedicated in 1917. Housing a museum, library, and auditorium, as well as a statue of McKinley and busts of his associates, it remains open to the public, free of charge.

== Inception and preparation ==
The McKinley Birthplace Memorial dollar was proposed as a fundraiser for the construction of the site in Niles. In February 1915, the association's head, Joseph G. Butler, Jr., met with Ohio Congressman William A. Ashbrook, chairman of the House Committee on Coinage, Weights, and Measures, to propose a silver dollar in honor of McKinley. Ashbrook was willing, and the two men saw Treasury Secretary William G. McAdoo and Acting Director of the Mint Frederic Dewey, who envisioned no difficulty. Accordingly, Ashbrook introduced a bill in the final days of the 63rd Congress, which took no action on it. When the 64th Congress opened in December 1915, Ashbrook reintroduced his bill, H.R. 2.

A hearing was held before Ashbrook's committee on January 13. Originally, the bill called for mintage of 100,000 silver dollars in commemoration of McKinley, but at the hearing, Butler requested that they be gold instead, stating, "if you will recall the fact, McKinley was elected in 1896 mainly on the question of the gold standard." The gold dollar had not been struck as a circulating coin since 1889. Asked a question from New York Congressman James W. Husted as to whether a gold dollar would be too small to be a souvenir, Butler responded, "No; I do not think so. I think, on the other hand, a silver dollar might be too large. I think we can dispose of gold dollars very much easier. Mr. Husted, and you know gold dollars are rather scarce just now." Ashbrook agreed, and stated:

my understanding is that these dollars will be sold at not less than $2 each which would make a profit of at least $100,000. I think there will be no trouble about disposing of them at that price. I understand they will be on sale in this memorial, and visitors who go to see it very largely will not leave the building without buying one, and will be willing to pay at least $2. I might say in that connection that any gold dollar coined by the United States is worth at least $2 at this time. They all command a premium, and there is no reason why this dollar would not sell for at least $2 and likely more.

Ohio Senator Warren G. Harding was present at the House committee meeting and spoke in favor of the bill, arguing that "this assistance on the part of the Federal Government will cost nothing more than the making of the dies". On being told that the dies, per the legislation, would be at the association's expense, Harding replied, "I did not notice that. Then, it essentially costs the Government nothing whatever to render this mark of tribute and assistance." The committee reported the bill favorably on January 18, amending the bill to allow for the 100,000 gold dollars, to be purchased by the association at par and sold at a profit to help build the memorial. The report indicated that the committee members "believe it is a deserved testimonial to the worth and service of a great man who lost his life while serving our Nation as its Chief Executive". The bill passed the House on February 7, 1916, and the Senate on February 15. President Woodrow Wilson signed the bill on February 23, 1916.

The act provided that no more than 100,000 pieces be struck, with the necessary gold bullion to be acquired in the open market. The association could purchase the coins at face value. The act required that the pieces be struck at the Philadelphia Mint, one of only two pieces of authorizing legislation in the classic commemorative coin series (through 1954) that specified the place of striking (the Panama–Pacific issue of 1915 had to be struck in San Francisco). The act also required that the dies be destroyed after the coining was done, something numismatists Anthony Swiatek and Walter Breen questioned as duplicating provisions in the Coinage Act of 1873.

The designs were prepared in-house at the Philadelphia Mint by Chief Engraver Charles E. Barber, who designed the obverse and his assistant, George T. Morgan, who prepared the reverse. They did not seek outside artists to submit proposals. Numismatic author Q. David Bowers suggested that this was because Secretary McAdoo had sought non-employees to propose designs for the five Panama–Pacific coins along with those sketches prepared by Barber and his assistants, and the Mint's engravers had prepared only two of the five, and that because the artist assigned one, Evelyn Beatrice Longman, had fallen ill. When the McKinley designs were submitted to the Commission of Fine Arts on March 31, 1916, it recommended changes, though Don Taxay, who so stated, does not say what they were. In any event, no alteration was made, and the designs were approved.

== Design ==
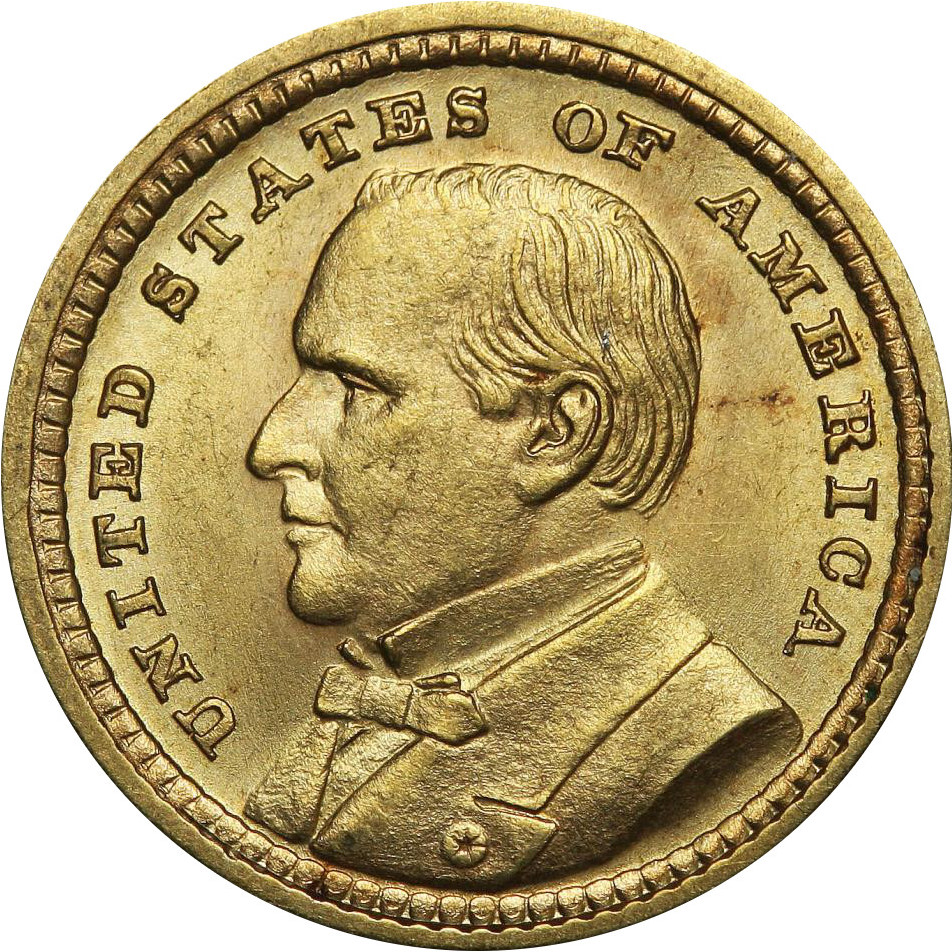
The McKinley version of the Louisiana Purchase Exposition dollar

The obverse of the dollar features an unadorned bust of McKinley, facing left, with the name of the country above and "McKinley Dollar" (in all capitals) below. McKinley, who had appeared on one version of the Louisiana Purchase Exposition dollar (issued beginning in 1903), thus became the first person to appear on two different issues of American coinage. The earlier pieces had also been designed by Barber, and the later coins, according to Bowers, "present an image so different that the uninformed observer would not know that the same man was being depicted". Bowers suggested that Barber might have been trying to create "a distinctively new version". Taxay agreed, opining that Barber's "chief concern seems to have been in making the portrait of McKinley as different as possible from that on the Louisiana Purchase coins".

The reverse, designed by Morgan, is intended to be a facing view of the McKinley birthplace memorial in Niles, but according to Swiatek and Breen, "the most charitable view must characterize it as inaccurate and incompetently done". Above the building is "McKinley Birthplace/Niles Ohio", and beneath it the date and "Memorial".

Art historian Cornelius Vermeule, in his volume on U.S. coins, disliked the McKinley pieces. "When Barber and Morgan collaborated ... the results were almost always oppressive. The McKinley Memorial dollars of 1916 and 1917 bear witness to these stylistic judgments, the unclothed bust on the obverse looking tastelessly Roman and the classical, colonnaded Memorial Building placed across a reverse further constricted by too much, too large lettering."

== Distribution and collecting ==
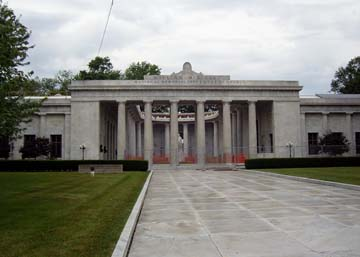
The National McKinley Birthplace Memorial

The Philadelphia Mint struck 20,000 gold dollars in August and October 1916, plus 26 extra reserved for inspection and testing at the 1917 meeting of the United States Assay Commission. In February 1917, 10,000 more (plus 14 assay coins) were minted, again at Philadelphia. The association sold these to the public at $3 each, the same price at which the Louisiana Purchase pieces, which sold poorly, had been vended. The McKinley Memorial pieces were ill-publicized, and few were sold at full price. Texas coin dealer B. Max Mehl purchased 10,000 pieces at an unknown price, selling them for years afterwards at $2.50 each.

The Washington Post reported on July 30, 1916, that the gold dollars had been released and were being "gobbled up as souvenirs". Nevertheless, according to Mehl in his 1937 volume on commemoratives, "the Committee in charge apparently realized that the number of collectors in the country could not and would not absorb an issue of 100,000 coins at $3.00 each" and some 10,000 coins "were disposed of at a greatly reduced price to the 'Texas Dealer' [that is, himself] who in turn distributed them extensively among collectors of the country at a reduced price". A total of 10,023 were returned by the Committee to the Mint for melting. It is uncertain how many of each year were melted, as the Mint did not keep records of this. Mehl estimated that the Committee sold 15,000 of the 1916 and 5,000 of the 1917 (including the sale to him), meaning that about 5,000 of each were melted. Bowers deemed these figures "probably correct", given Mehl's personal dealings with the Committee. Bowers calculated that 8,000 of the 1916 were sold by the Committee to collectors and the public, plus 7,000 to Mehl. He opined that 2,000 of the 1917 were sold by the Committee at full price, plus 3,000 to Mehl. Swiatek, in his 2012 book on commemoratives, estimated that between a third and half of the melted pieces were dated 1917.

According to R. S. Yeoman's 2015 edition of A Guide Book of United States Coins, the 1916 is catalogued for $500 in slightly-worn AU-50 (almost uncirculated) to $1,850 in near-pristine MS-66. The 1917 is listed at $550 in AU-50 and $3,250 in MS-66. A 1916 in MS-68 condition was sold by Heritage Auctions in 2009 for $16,100.

== References and bibliography ==
Sources

- Bowers, Q. David (1992). Commemorative Coins of the United States: A Complete Encyclopedia. Wolfeboro, NH: Bowers and Merena Galleries, Inc. ISBN 978-0-94316-135-8.
- Flynn, Kevin (2008). The Authoritative Reference on Commemorative Coins 1892–1954. Roswell, GA: Kyle Vick. OCLC 711779330.
- Harpine, William D. (2005). From the Front Porch to the Front Page: McKinley and Bryan in the 1896 Presidential Campaign. Presidential Rhetoric. Vol. 13. College Station, Texas: Texas A&M University Press. ISBN 978-1-58544-559-2.
- McElroy, Richard L. (1996). William McKinley and Our America (softcover ed.). Canton, Ohio: Stark County Historical Society. ISBN 978-0-9634712-1-5.
- Mehl, B. Max (1937). The Commemorative Coinage of the United States. Fort Worth, TX: B. Max Mehl. OCLC 2872685.
- "The National McKinley Memorial Niles, Ohio" (PDF). Niles, OH: The National McKinley Memorial Association.
- Slabaugh, Arlie R. (1975). United States Commemorative Coinage (second ed.). Racine, WI: Whitman Publishing. ISBN 978-0-307-09377-6.
- Swiatek, Anthony (2012). Encyclopedia of the Commemorative Coins of the United States. Chicago: KWS Publishers. ISBN 978-0-9817736-7-4.
- Swiatek, Anthony; Breen, Walter (1981). The Encyclopedia of United States Silver & Gold Commemorative Coins, 1892 to 1954. New York: Arco Publishing. ISBN 978-0-668-04765-4.
- Taxay, Don (1967). An Illustrated History of U.S. Commemorative Coinage. New York: Arco Publishing. ISBN 978-0-668-01536-3.
- U.S. House Committee on Coinage, Weights, and Measures (1916). Coinage of McKinley Souvenir Dollar: Hearings before the Committee on Coinage, Weights, and Measures, House of Representatives, Sixty-fourth Congress, First Session, on H.R. 2, January 13, 1916. Washington: U.S. Government Printing Office.
- U.S. House Committee on Coinage, Weights, and Measures (1916). Coinage of McKinley Souvenir Dollar. H. Rep. 64-55. Congressional Serial Set. Vol. 6903. Washington: U.S. Government Printing Office.
- Vermeule, Cornelius (1971). Numismatic Art in America. Cambridge, MA: The Belknap Press of Harvard University Press. ISBN 978-0-674-62840-3.
- Yeoman, R. S. (2014). A Guide Book of United States Coins (68th ed.). Atlanta, GA: Whitman Publishing. ISBN 978-0-7948-4215-4.
