= Niles City School District =

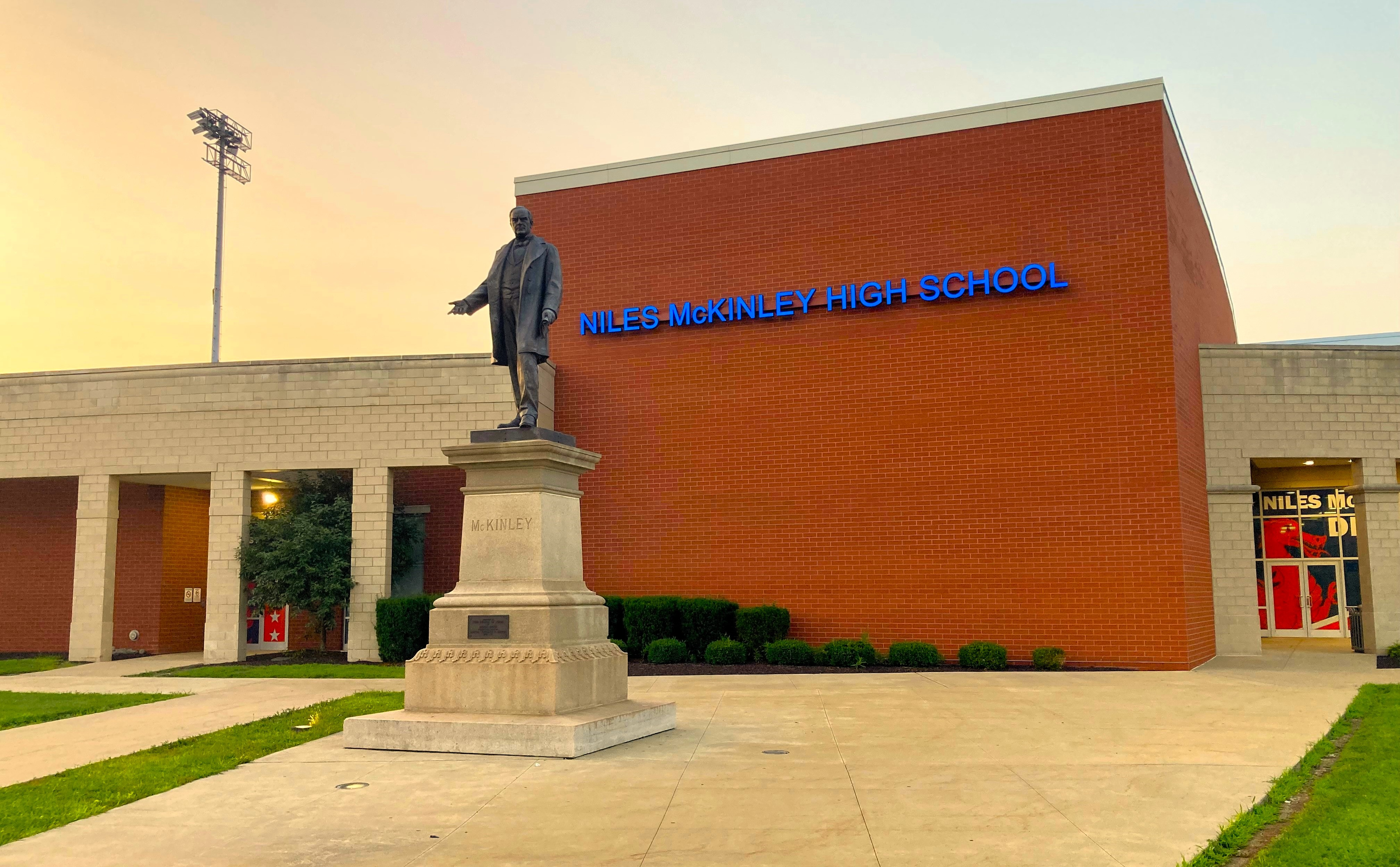
- Niles McKinley High School

Location
- 309 Rhodes Ave; Niles, Ohio 44446; United States

Information
- Type: Public
- NCES District ID: 3904449
- Teaching staff: 126.30 (on FTE basis)
- Grades: K–12
- Enrollment: 1,877 (2024–25)
- Student to teacher ratio: 14.86
- Colors: Red and blue
- Team name: Red Dragons
- Website: www.nilescityschools.org/nilesmckinleyhighschool_home.aspx

The Niles City School District is a public school district based in Niles, Ohio, United States. The school district includes one high school, one middle school, and two elementary schools.

== History ==
The Niles City School District began in the early 1900s. Several schools within the district were renamed after United States Presidents.

In 1953, Niles voters approved a bond issue to construct modern school buildings in anticipation of the post-war baby boom. Niles McKinley High School was built in 1957 and named after Niles native William McKinley, the 25th President of the United States. It was followed later that decade by Lincoln Elementary and S.J. Bonham Elementary. Jackson Elementary was built in 1965, as the districts first climate-controlled school.

Monore, Jefferson, and Roosevelt schools were demolished between the 1960s and 1980s, with other elementary consolidating.

Niles City Schools was placed on the fiscal watch listed in the early 2000s, in an effort to control and manage budget problems it was facing, the district was later removed from the list in 2015.

During the early 2000s and into the 2010s Niles closed several long-time elementary and junior high schools due to declining enrollment., Garfield School was the most recent to be demolished in 2019.

== Schools ==
Schools within the district include:

=== High school ===
- Niles McKinley High School

=== Middle school ===
- Niles Middle School

=== Elementary schools ===
- Niles Intermediate School
- Niles Primary School

=== Former schools ===
- Grant Street School
- Jackson School
- Lincoln School
- Monroe School
- Jefferson School
- Garfield School
- Roosevelt School
- Harrison School
- Washington School
- Edison Junior High School
- S.J. Bonham Elementary School
