= National McKinley Birthplace Memorial =

National memorial in Ohio, United States

- U.S. National Register of Historic Places
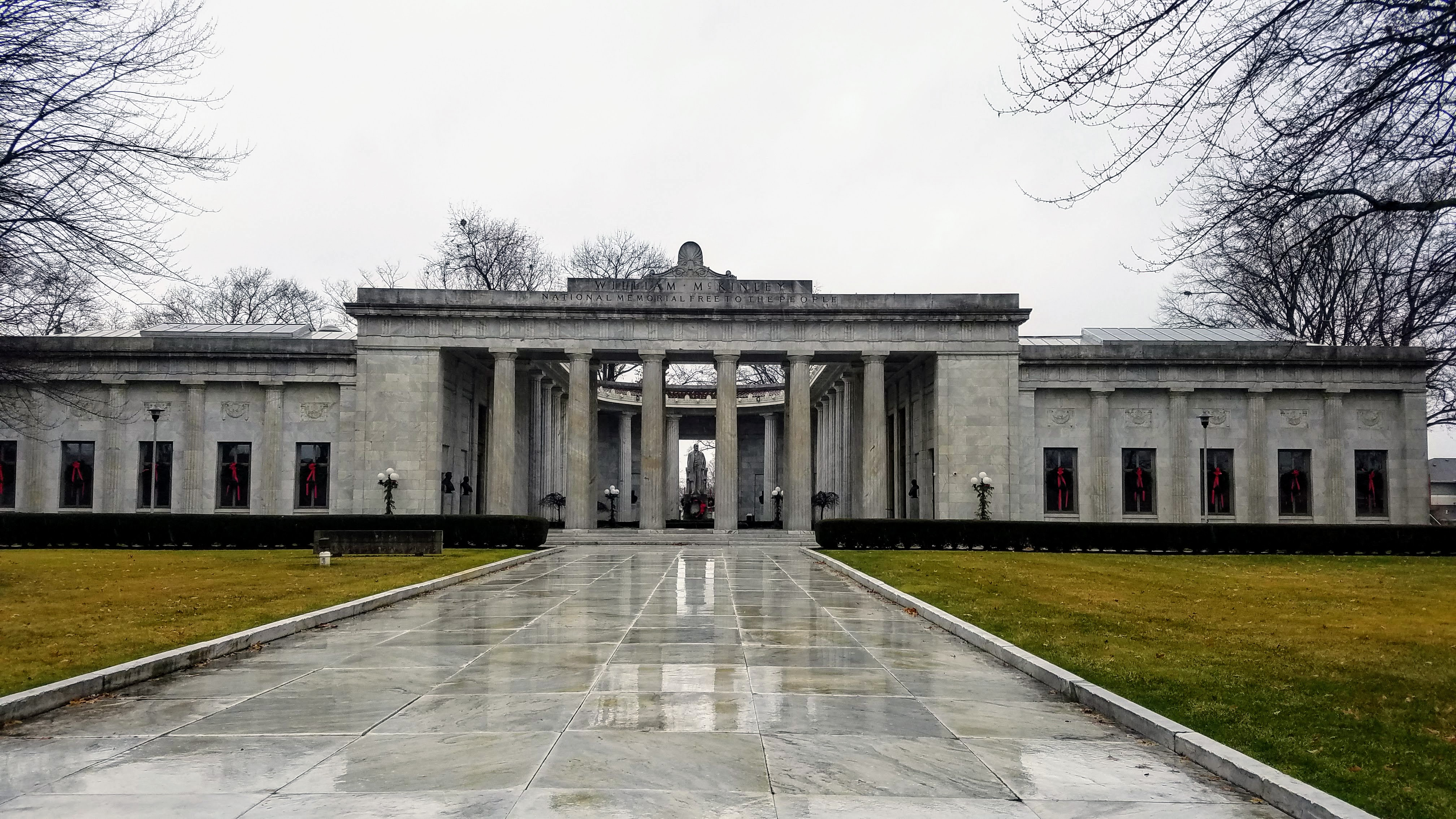
- The memorial in 2019

- Location within Ohio Location within the United States
- Interactive map of National McKinley Birthplace Memorial
- Location: 40 N. Main Street; Niles, Ohio, U.S.
- Coordinates: 41°10′51″N 80°45′58″W
- Area: Less than one acre
- Built: 1915-1917
- Architect: McKim, Mead and White
- Architectural style: Beaux-Arts (exterior)
- NRHP reference No.: 75001544
- Added to NRHP: October 31, 1975

The National McKinley Birthplace Memorial is a presidential memorial in Niles, Ohio, built in honor of William McKinley, the 25th president of the United States. Built between 1915 and 1917, it is a 232 by 136 by 38 ft (71 by 41 by 12 m) Beaux-Arts marble monument with two wings. One wing houses a public library, and the other features a museum dedicated to McKinley. The McKinley Birthplace Home and Research Center is located near the memorial.

== History ==
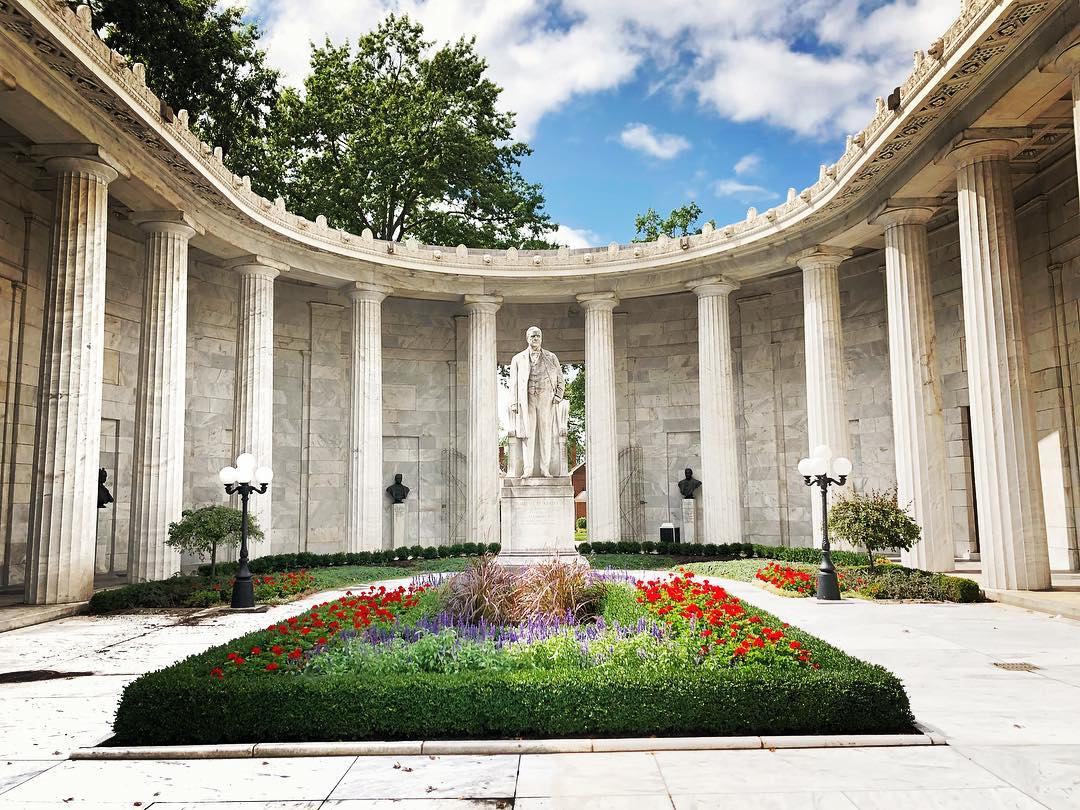
Court of Honor inside the memorial, including J. Massey Rhind's statue of McKinley

=== Planning ===
On March 4, 1911, President William Howard Taft authorized Congressional funding for a national memorial to be located in the town of McKinley's birth, Niles, Ohio. The same act of Congress had also officially established the National McKinley Birthplace Association. Association president Joseph G. Butler, Jr., who had been a childhood friend and schoolmate of McKinley, began a $100,000 local campaign to raise funds for the memorial in 1912. After securing nearly $200,000 for the memorial without utilizing taxpayer funding, Butler and the association sought public donations of $1 each to establish a permanent endowment. "Subscribers" (as the donors were called) would receive a book autographed by Butler "describing the work of the Memorial" that also contained a reproduction portrait of McKinley and "a facsimile of the act of Congress authorizing and commending the construction of the Birthplace Memorial."

=== Competition and design ===
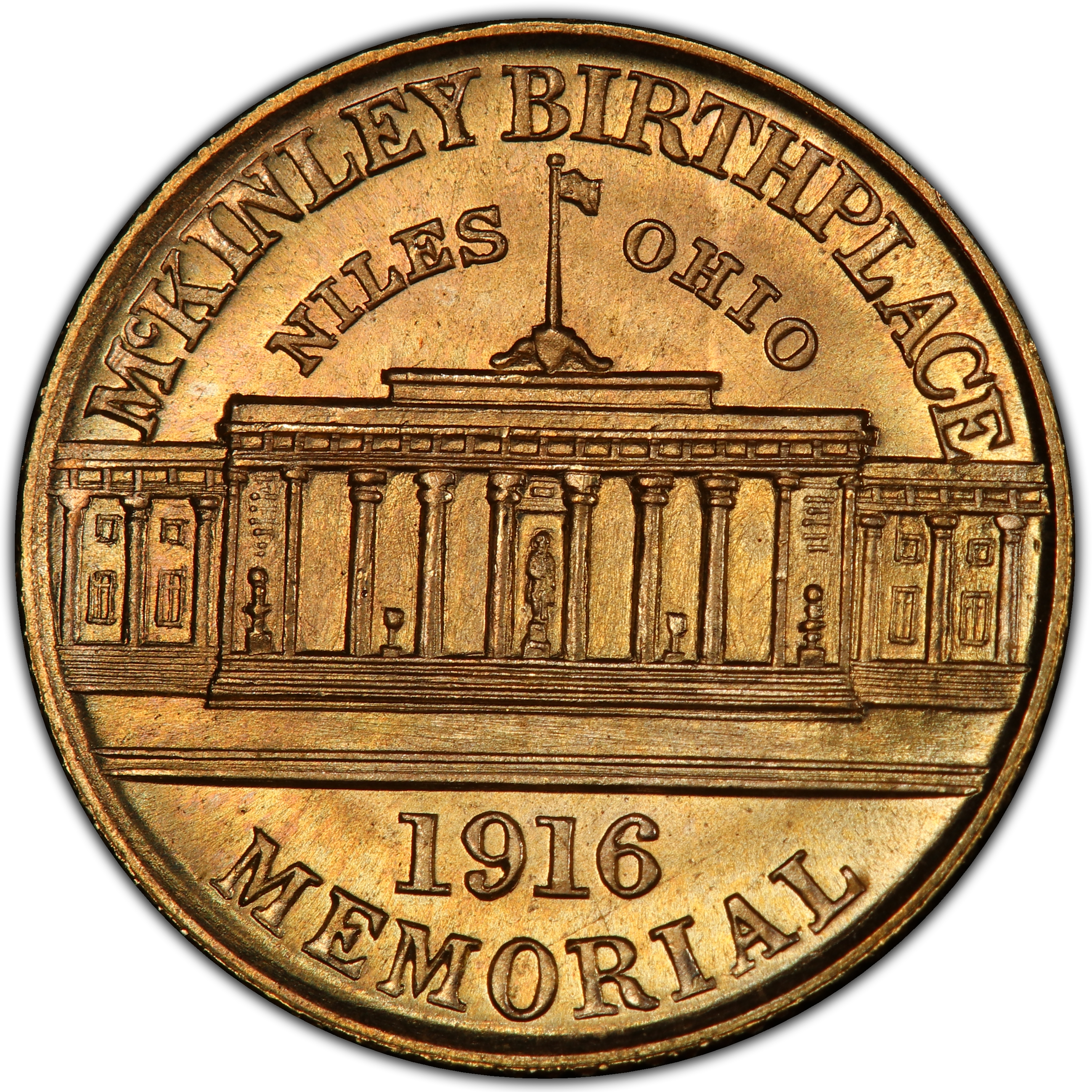
The memorial is the subject of the 1916–17 commemorative McKinley Birthplace Memorial dollar

The Association had its own ideas for the memorial's general design when it announced plans to offer a prize for the best architectural proposal in 1914. The city of Niles had already set aside a five-acre park as a location for the memorial (purchased with municipal funds), and the association stipulated that the design would be for a granite two-story structure with a basement, and that the structure must include a 1,000-seat auditorium (the "main feature"), a public library, a "relic room" for display of assorted effects, "an assembly hall for meetings of the veterans of the Grand Army of the Republic, where State encampments may be held, and for Spanish–American War Veterans, and a room for the meetings of officials of the city." Additionally, the association specified that the memorial would house not only a statue of McKinley, but also "bronze busts of men associated with him in the affairs of the nation," such as those of Theodore Roosevelt, Marcus Hanna, Butler, and Andrew Carnegie and Henry Clay Frick. Carnegie and Frick were large contributors to the memorial's fund. Upon publication of the association's announcement, a competition commenced within the American Institute of Architects.

Edgerton Swartout (formerly with McKim, Mead & White), Charles A. Platt (landscape architect) and Edward Brodhead Green (Albright-Knox Art Gallery) served as judges for the competition. Entries included those from Cass Gilbert (architect of the Woolworth Building), Henry Bacon (designer of the Lincoln Memorial), Harold Van Buren Magonigle (architect of the McKinley National Memorial and Mausoleum), the firm of Palmer, Hornbostel & Jones, J. L. Decker (a local architect) and Zantzinger, Borie & Medary (designers of the Detroit Institute of Arts).

The competition was concluded in 1915, and the $1,000 prize was awarded to McKim, Mead, & White. Their design, somewhat typical of their other Beaux-Arts work, reflected Greek and Roman themes in all aspects, from architectural elements to the lettering on tablets and statuary. Indeed, the entire memorial was described as would be a temple of antiquity, with McKinley assuming the role of "household god":

"Seen from the approach on Main Street, the building will be dominated by its central feature, a colonnade or propylaea leading into a court of honor.
It is this court, the atrium of the old Roman palaces where the statue of the household god stood, which is to be the climax of the entire structure."

The library was divided into two stories, with space for open stacks and meeting rooms, including one reserved for McKinley memorabilia.

McKinley's statue, by J. Massey Rhind, originally conceived as a bronze monument, was carved from a single 35-ton piece of marble.

=== Construction ===
The cornerstone of the memorial was laid on November 20, 1915, and an inscribed plaque on it read "Erected 1915. To Perpetuate the Name and Achievements of William McKinley, Twenty-fifth President of the United States of America. Born January 29, 1843. Died September 14, 1901." The United States Marine Band played "On the Beautiful Blue Danube" (a favorite of Mrs. McKinley's) and "Lead Kindly Light" (reportedly a hymn sung at McKinley's deathbed) after a parade of organizations to which McKinley belonged proceeded down Niles' Main Street.

John H. Parker Co. of New York oversaw the site's construction.

Despite the National McKinley Birthplace Association's specification for a granite structure, Georgia marble was used instead.

=== Dedication ===
Former President Taft (also an Ohio native), in a speech endorsing American involvement in World War I, praised McKinley at the memorial's dedication ceremonies on October 5, 1917. McKinley's sister Helen unveiled her brother's 12-foot statue. Myron T. Herrick, George B. Cortelyou and Butler also spoke during the ceremonies. The McKinley Birthplace Memorial gold dollar was minted to finance the construction of the memorial.

== Current status ==
The McKinley Memorial Library is open to the public six days a week and closed on Sundays and on certain holidays. The McKinley Memorial Museum is also open to the public Tuesday to Friday with no admission charge. In 2008, the memorial underwent renovation to clean and repair the marble façade.

== See also ==
- List of sculptures of presidents of the United States
- National Register of Historic Places listings in Trumbull County, Ohio
