= Ben Neuman =

American virologist

Dr Benjamin W Neuman
- Born: September 1974 (age 51)
- Spouse: Nicola Benning
- Children: Isaac Neuman, Theia Neuman

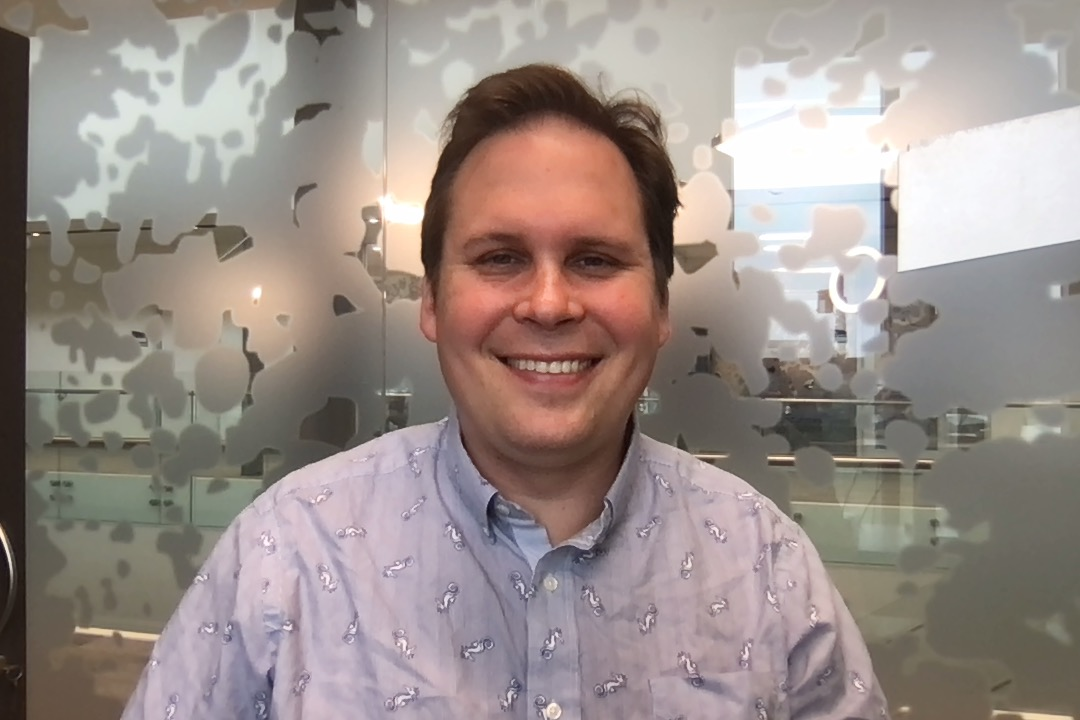
Dr Benjamin Neuman

Benjamin W. Neuman is an American virologist.

== Early life and education ==
Neuman was born to parents Doug Neuman and Billie Porter Neuman in Ashtabula, Ohio. As the oldest of four children (siblings Jacob, Rebecca and Samuel), he attended Niles McKinley High School in Niles, Ohio before enrolling at the University of Toledo for his bachelor's degree. Following this, he enrolled at the University of Reading for his PhD in Animal and Microbial Sciences and completed his postdoctoral research in virology at the Scripps Research Institute in La Jolla, CA. He is currently a biology and medical school faculty member at Texas A&M University and serves as the Chief Virologist at the university's Global Health Research Complex.

== Career ==
During the COVID-19 pandemic, Neuman served on the international committee on the taxonomy of viruses, a COVID-19 study group. He oversaw the Texas A&M University Global Health Research Complex which identified a variant of the virus whose full significance was unknown. In order to counter the virus, he encouraged the continued use of masks, washing hands, and staying six feet apart and has recorded hundreds of educational videos via his YouTube account, Ask Dr Ben.
