= Hlai =

Hlai may refer to:

- Hlai people, an ethnic group of China
- Hlai languages, a group of Tai-Kadai languages

== See also ==
- Hlay
- Hliai, a hamlet in Valozhyn District, Belarus
