= Scapuzzi =

Scapuzzi is an Italian surname. Notable people with the surname include:

- Bartolomeo Scapuzzi (1750–18??), Italian Baroque painter
- Luca Scapuzzi (born 1991), Italian footballer

== See also ==
- Capuzzi
