= McKinley Bank Building =

Coordinates: 41°10′47″N 80°45′56″W

The William McKinley Federal Savings and Loan was a bank located in Niles, Ohio. It sat on the site of William McKinley's birthplace, which was moved twice before it was destroyed in 1937. The McKinley Birthplace Home and Research Center now occupies the site. The plaque which hung in the bank is now located in the replica birthplace.
