= Joe Vitale =

Joe or Joseph Vitale is the name of:

- Joe Vitale (musician) (born 1949), American singer, songwriter, and multi-instrumentalist
- Joseph Vitale (author) (born 1953), American author and spiritual teacher
- Joe F. Vitale (born 1954), American Democratic Party politician
- Joe Vitale (ice hockey) (born 1985), American former professional ice hockey player and sportscaster
