= Cynthia S. Burnett =

American educator, temperance reformer and newspaper editor (1840–1932)

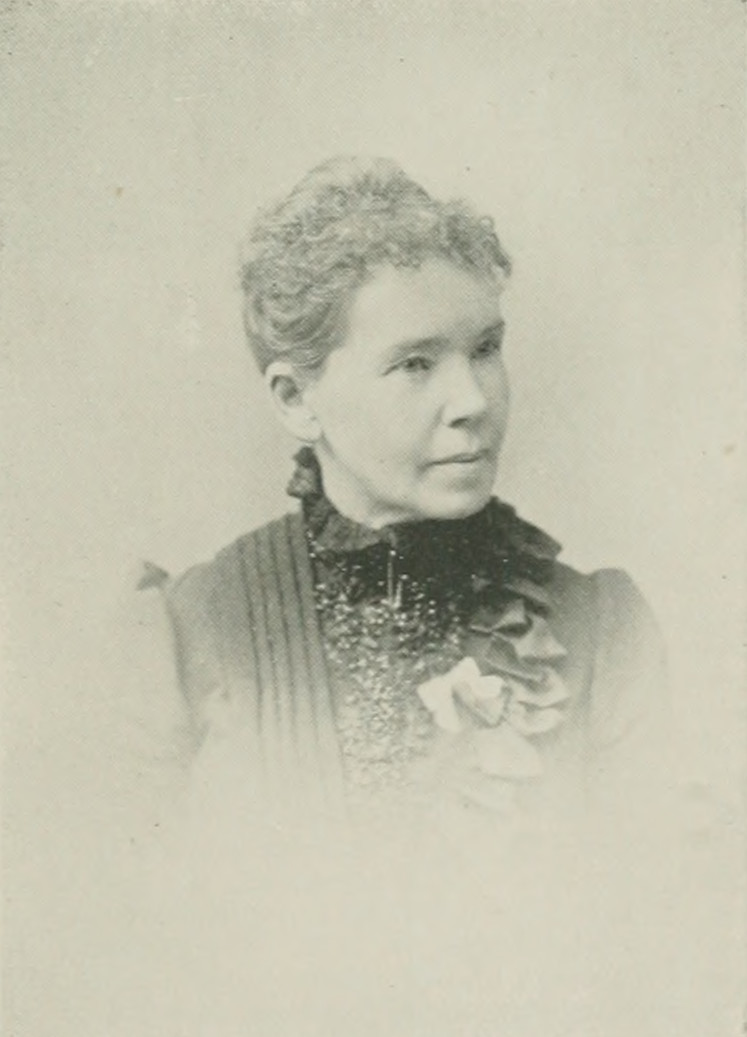
- Photo in A Woman of the Century
- Born: Cynthia Samantha Burnett; May 1, 1840; Niles, Ohio, U.S.
- Died: July 24, 1932 (aged 92); Port Saint Lucie, Florida, U.S.
- Occupations: educator; temperance reformer; newspaper editor
- Spouse: Dr. Horace J. Haney

Cynthia S. Burnett (after marriage, Cynthia Burnett-Haney; May 1, 1840 - July 24, 1932) was an American educator, temperance reformer, and newspaper editor. After passing her early life in Ohio, her first temperance movement work was done in Illinois, in 1879, later, answering calls for help in Florida, Tennessee, Ohio, and Pennsylvania. In 1885, she was made state organizer of Ohio, and the first year of this appointment, she lectured 165 times, besides holding meetings in the daytime and organizing over 40 unions. Her voice failing, she accepted a call to Utah as teacher in the Methodist Episcopal College, in Salt Lake City. While living there, she was made territorial president of the Woman's Christian Temperance Union (WCTU). After spending a year as state organizer in California and Nevada, she was made a national organizer in 1889. She spent later years as preceptress of her alma mater, which has become Farmington College. In 1929, she was recognized by the Florida Newspaper News as Florida's oldest active newspaper woman.

== Early life and education ==
Cynthia Samantha Burnett was born in Niles, Ohio, on May 1, 1840.

Burnett's early life was divided between home duties and study.

== Career ==
At the age of 17, she was both a teacher in the public schools near her home and a student in the neighboring academy. The American Civil War affected her life, and she resolved to study for four years in the Western Reserve Seminary (West Farmington, Ohio), from which she was graduated in the classical course in 1868. She at once accepted the position of preceptress and teacher of Latin in Orwell Normal Institute. Three years later, she took the position of teacher of languages in Beaver College. Failing health made a change of climate necessary, and she went to the old home of her mother in Virginia, where she had charge of a training school for teachers. Two years were spent in the Methodist Episcopal College in Tullahoma, Tennessee. There, she became interested in the "New South," and many letters to the press in defense of their struggling people.

At the first opportunity after the crusade, she donned the white ribbon. Her first public work was done in 1879, in Illinois. Later, she answered calls for help in Florida, Tennessee, Ohio, and Pennsylvania. In 1885, she was made State organizer of Ohio. The first year she lectured 165 times, besides holding meetings in the daytime and organizing over 40 unions. Her voice failing, she accepted a call to Utah, as teacher in the Methodist Episcopal College in Salt Lake City. She was made territorial president of the WCTU. Eight unions and 15 loyal legions were organized by her. Each month, one or more meetings were held by her in the penitentiary. She edited a temperance column in a Mormon paper. Tabernacles and schoolhouses were open to her, and through the assistance of missionaries and Mormons alike, she lectured in many towns.

Unable any longer to work so hard, and believing that her real place was in the lecture field, she accepted a call to southern California as State organizer. She spent one year there and in Nevada, during which time, 150 lectures were given by her. For efficient service in the West she was made National organizer in 1889, but was soon after called home by the serious illness of her mother, and she remained near or with her parents thereafter. She continued her work as State organizer until she accepted the position of preceptress in her alma mater, now Farmington College.

== Personal life and death ==
After coming to Stuart, Florida, she married Dr. Horace J. Haney (1834-1912). Though they divorced in 1903, she stayed in Stuart. Haney Circle in Stuart was named on her behalf. Burnett died July 24, 1932, in Port Saint Lucie, Florida, and is buried in Fernhill Memorial Gardens and Mausoleum in Stuart.
