= Niles McKinley High School =

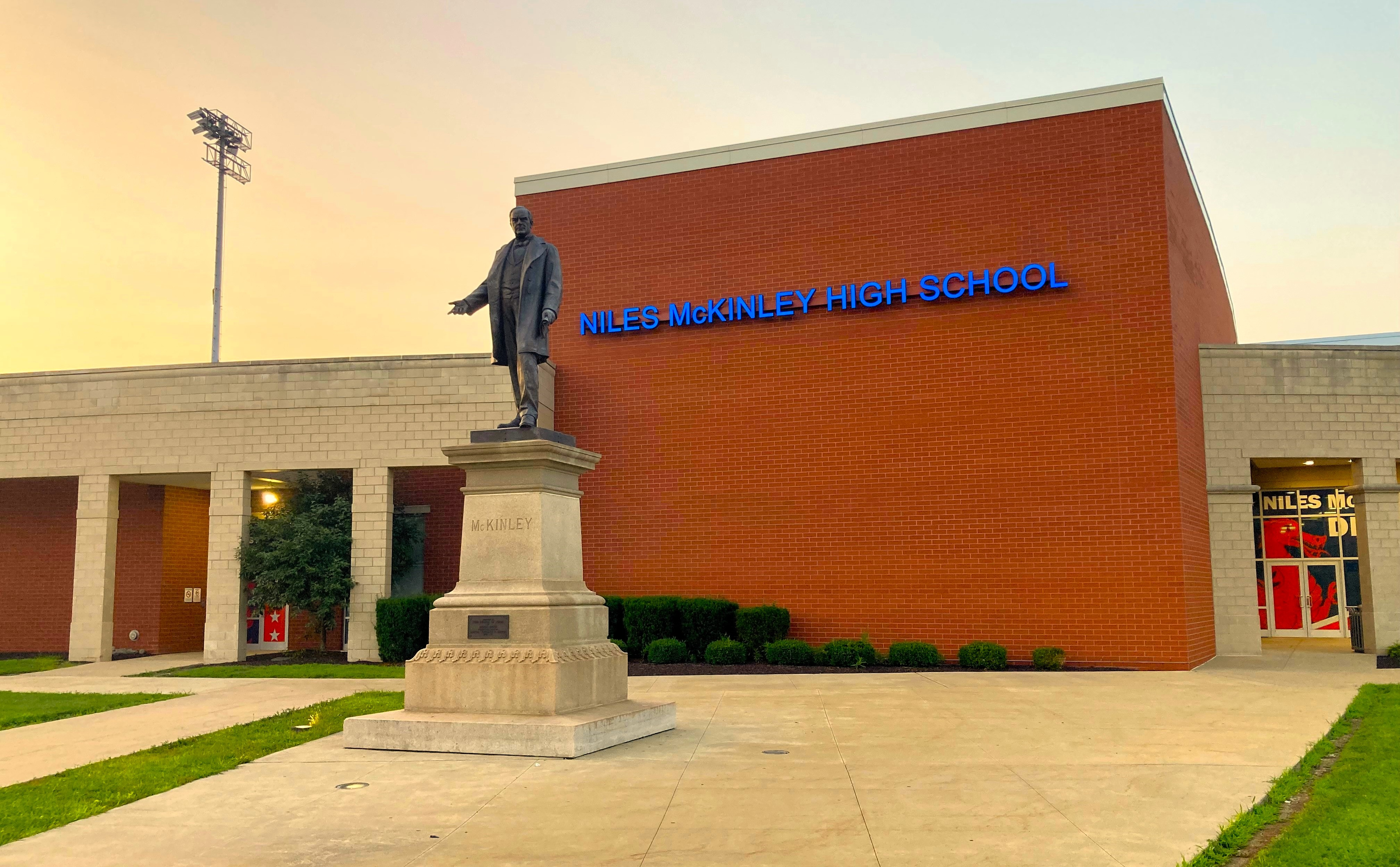

Location
- 616 Dragon Drive; Niles, Ohio 44446; United States; 41°11′16″N 80°45′39″W

Information
- Type: Public
- Established: 1871
- School district: Niles City School District
- NCES School ID: 390444901412
- Principal: Stephen Rovnak
- Teaching staff: 35.77 (on FTE basis)
- Grades: 9-12
- Enrollment: 530 (2024–25)
- Student to teacher ratio: 14.82
- Colors: Red and blue
- Team name: Red Dragons
- Website: www.nilescityschools.org/nilesmckinleyhighschool_home.aspx

Niles McKinley High School is a public high school in Niles, Ohio. It is the only high school in the Niles City School District. Athletic teams are known as the Red Dragons, and they compete as a member of the Ohio High School Athletic Association in the Northeast 8 Athletic Conference.

== History ==
In 1871, Niles built a three-story building constructed on Main Street, which became Niles first centralized high school. A separate high school building was built heading into the early 20th century, later being named McKinley High School to honor the 25th United States President William McKinley, who was a native of Niles.

Following World War II, enrollment grew within the school district, leading to the Niles Board of Education to propose a bond issue to construct a modern secondary school. Voters approved of the bond issue in 1953. Construction of the new high school began in 1956 on Dragon Drive; the new facility was designed to accommodate roughly 750 students and included a new gymnasium. Niles McKinley High School was formally dedicated in October 1957.

The previous high school building was converted into Edison Junior High School in 1958, the former structure served the district for several decades, until its demolition in 2004, and was replaced by senior housing.

== Athletics ==
=== Associated Press poll championships ===
- Football - 1961, 1953

=== Facilities ===
Bo Rein Memorial Stadium

Bo Rein Stadium, located adjacent from the high school is a high school football stadium, which hosts the Niles McKinley Red Dragons high school football and soccer teams, and dependent on weather, the high school's baseball and softball teams. The stadium, built in 1933 under the United States WPA programwas originally named Riverside Stadium, but later renamed to honor Bo Rein, an alumnus of McKinley High School and successful college football coach in 1981. The stadium features an electronic scoreboard, press boxes on the home and away stands, as well as an artificial turf that features the schools name and mascot in both sides of the endzones along with an "N" in the center of the field, which is named Eastwood Mall Field. The stadium is built to seat 9,718 individuals.

== Notable alumni ==
- Michael Defensor - Filipino politician
- John Hlay - former college football player
- Ben Neuman - virologist
- Keith W. Piper - former college football coach
- Bo Rein, former college football player
- Karl Singer - former professional football player in the American Football League (AFL)
- Herb Stein - former professional football player in the National Football League (NFL)
- Joseph Vitale - author
