= Harry M. Stevens =

English-American food concessionaire

- Born: June 14, 1855; Derby, England, UK (Note: Some sources note alternate birth dates and locations, such as July 14, 1855, in London.)
- Died: May 3, 1934 (aged 78); Manhattan, New York, U.S.
- Resting place: Union Cemetery, Niles, Ohio, U.S.
- Occupation: Food concessionaire
- Known for: Ballpark food, creation of baseball scorecard, purported inventor of the hot dog
- Children: 5

Harry Mozley Stevens (Note: Stevens' middle name appears as both Mozley and Mosley in different sources.) (June 14, 1855 – May 3, 1934) was a food concessionaire from England credited with being America's foremost ballpark concessionaire. Various sources also credit him with being the inventor of the hot dog.

== Biography ==
Stevens was born in Derby, England, in 1855 and had connections to Litchurch there. He emigrated to Niles, Ohio, in the United States in 1882. He was first employed as an ironworker, then as a traveling book salesman.

In the late 1880s, Stevens traveled to Columbus, Ohio, and attended a baseball game. He found the scorecard he was sold to be deficient, and quickly made his mark by designing and selling a version with a illustration on the cover, player names and positions listed inside, and an advertisement on the back, a design still in use. He sold his scorecards to fans using the phrase "You can't tell the players without a scorecard." Over time, he expanded to Toledo, Milwaukee, and Pittsburgh, and also founded Harry M. Stevens Inc., a stadium concessions company. In the mid-1890s, he expanded to New York City after meeting with John Montgomery Ward, then-manager of the New York Giants. By 1900, Stevens had secured contracts to supply refreshments at several major-league ballparks across the country.

Stevens claimed that at a Giants' home game on a cold April day in 1901, (Note: Some versions of the story cite alternate years.) there was limited demand for ice cream so he decided to sell German "dachshund sausages", having his staff place them in bread rolls and sell them as "red hots". Newspaper cartoonist Tad Dorgan, reportedly recounting the event, was said to have been unable to spell dachshund, so wrote "hot dogs" instead. This account has been disputed by researchers, who point out the earliest known hot-dog cartoon by Dorgan dates to 1906, and "the term 'hot dog' was used for sausages in buns as early as 1895 in college newspapers."

Stevens died in May 1934 in Manhattan following two bouts of pneumonia; (Note: Some sources cited arteriosclerosis as his cause of death.) he was survived by his wife and five children.

Harry M. Stevens Inc. was acquired by Aramark on December 12, 1994.

== Memorials ==
Stevens Park in Niles, Ohio, which opened in 1936, was named in his honor after his family donated its 35 acres (14 ha) to the city. In 2013, the community began an annual "Harry Stevens Hot Dog Day". The event includes entertainment, a dachshund race, and a hot dog eating contest.

In early 2013, Derby City Council and Derby Civic Society jointly announced they would erect a blue plaque (historical marker) to his memory on his first marital home at 21 Russell Street in Derby.

== Sources ==
- Rippon, Nicola, Derbyshire's Own, The History Press, 2006, ISBN 0750942592.
