= Niles Masonic Temple =

- U.S. National Register of Historic Places
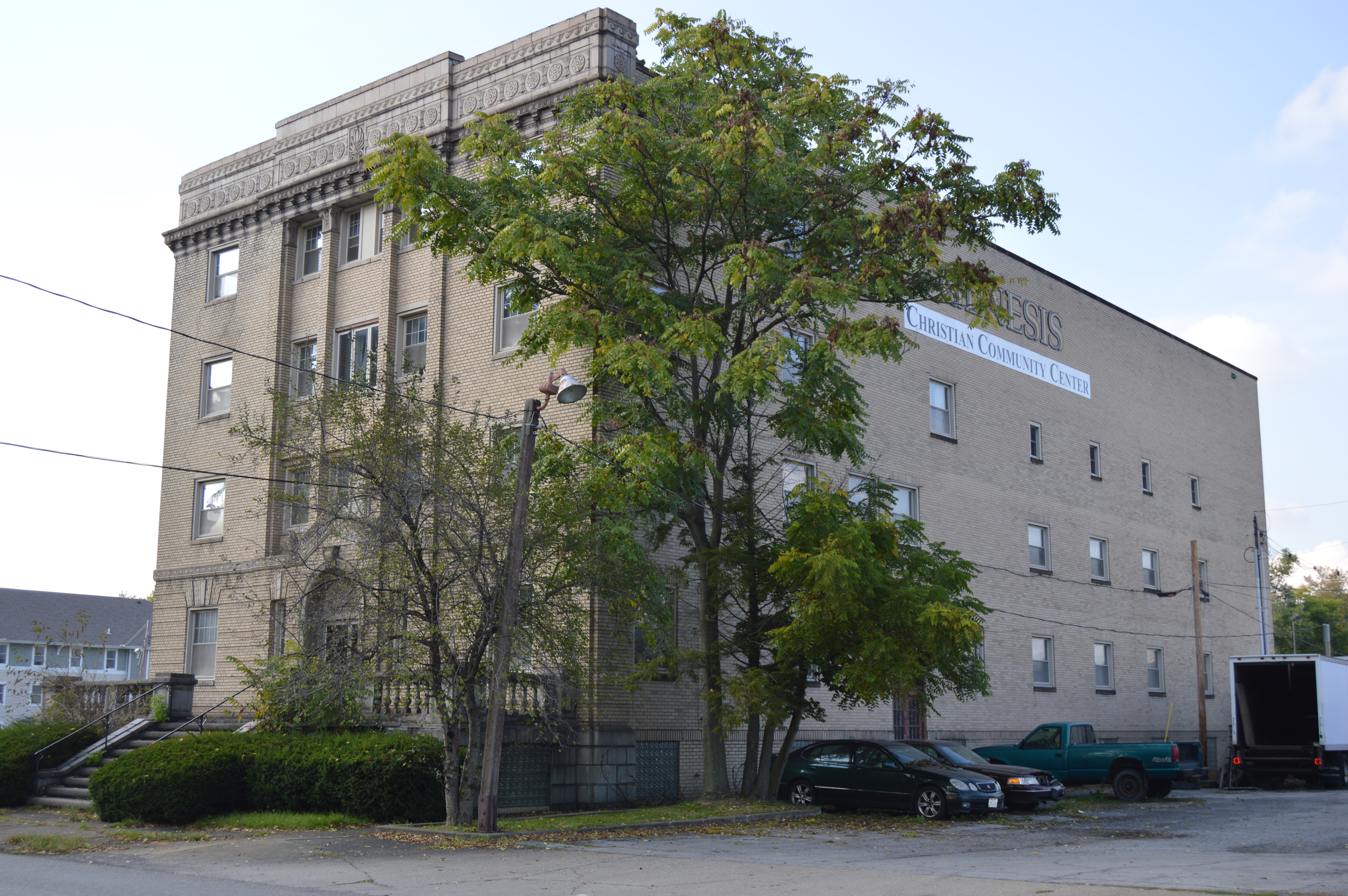
- Front and eastern side

- Location within Ohio Location within the United States
- Location: 22 W. Church St., Niles, Ohio
- Coordinates: 41°10′55″N 80°45′59″W
- Area: less than one acre
- Built: 1923
- Architect: Keich, Robert; Hess & Noble
- Architectural style: Masonic Temple
- NRHP reference No.: 06000274
- Added to NRHP: April 12, 2006

The Niles Masonic Temple is a historic Masonic building in Niles, Ohio. It was constructed in 1923 as a meeting hall for a local Masonic lodge, and was listed on the National Register of Historic Places in 2006. In 2009 the Masons moved to new premises, and today the building houses the Genesis Christian Community Center.
