= Knights of the Flaming Circle =

American anti-KKK militant organization

The Knights of the Flaming Circle was a militant organization founded in 1923 to fight the anti-Catholic Ku Klux Klan. They were part of an opposition that included politicians, labor leaders and immigrant groups. Membership was open to anyone who opposed the KKK and was "not a Protestant". They had significant support amongst various ethnic groups in Pennsylvania and West Virginia. Bryce Bauer has written that, "Instead of only admitting white, native-born Protestants as the Klan did, the organization vowed to accept anyone who was anything other than that."

They were one of a number of national organizations in the US organized in the 1920s in opposition to growing influence of the KKK. Notable outbreaks of violence took place in the Mahoning Valley of Ohio and in "Bloody Williamson" county of Southern Illinois.

== Prohibition Era ==
During the early to mid 1920s the Klan targeted Catholics and immigrants. They supported the Volstead Act during the era of Prohibition, and were willing to enforce the liquor laws through vigilantism. They blamed Catholics for bootlegging, and informed on moonshiners to local law enforcement. They blamed the lack of enforcement of the Volstead Act on corrupt law enforcement. One Klan member wrote the following, referring to Catholics as fish eaters (a derogatory reference to the Catholic practice of eating fish on Fridays in Lent): "We have a Klan Sheriff but our prosecuting attorney is a fish eater and will do anything he can to fish the Klan".

At times, the Klan burned crosses in front of Catholic homes. The name "Knights of the Flaming Circle" refers to the Klan's burning cross. In 1923, the same year that the organization was founded, the editors of Catholic World wrote that Catholic citizens would act against the Klan in "self-defense, even to the extent of bloodshed." In some parts of the country, Catholic members of the Red Knights responded with "mass, armed counterattacks" significant enough for the National Guard to be called during at least one of these actions.

=== Ohio ===
On August 15, 1923, a Klan motorcade from East Liverpool, Ohio, and Chester, West Virginia, came downriver to Steubenville, Ohio, where they met at a hotel for dinner. The opponents of the Klan, members of the local Flaming Circle, gathered outside the hotel. Six or seven cars were overturned and the Klansmen were attacked with bricks, bottles and clubs. Reports noted between 2,500 and 3,000 people participated in the melee. Although many injuries were reported, no deaths seemed to have taken place.

In May 1924, Niles, Ohio, the Ku Klux Klan paraded through the city. Violence prevented a second parade from taking place the next month in June. The Klan rescheduled for November 1, 1924, and the Knights of the Flaming Circle announced plans for a competing counter-march, promising 10,000 participants. On October 29, someone bombed the home of the city's mayor because he refused to revoke the parade permit. Tensions escalated and resulted in 18 hours of full-blown rioting ended only with 10 days of martial law. Only in the last few years has research focused on Italian-American resources and eyewitness accounts.

=== New Mexico ===
Both the Klan and Flaming Circle were active in Raton, New Mexico. Both the fiery cross and a flaming circle appeared in early April 1925 in the days before the local school board election. Both organizations each backed a slate of candidates.

== Civil Rights Era ==
The organization disappeared in the 1930s as the second version of the Klan faded from the public spotlight. It resurfaced in some areas a few decades later though during the Civil Rights Movement. In 1965, Thomas Jordan, a former councilman from Wanaque, New Jersey, announced plans to reorganize the Knights of the Flaming Circle after the re-appearance of the Klan in New Jersey. Following telephone death threats from a voice with a Southern drawl, local police provided Jordan with protection.

On June 9, 1970, Rev. Herman Mohney and Percy McIntyre touched off a burning cross on McIntyre's 44-acre farm near Templeton, Pennsylvania, as part of a ceremony for the Flaming Circle. The pair claimed to have more than 500 followers signed up. The organization planned to join with unions and the unemployed and would fight for widows and poor people. The pair "disclaimed any relations to Nazis, Communists or the Ku Klux Klan." The organizers claimed connection with hard-hat construction unions and included a number of honorably discharged military veterans. McIntyre served as the organization's commander. Mohney served as chief of chaplains. The group did not appear to be connected with the earlier Knights of the Flaming Circle, but used both elements of the Klan and the Flaming Circle in its operations.
