= Hezekiah Niles =

American editor and publisher (1777–1839)

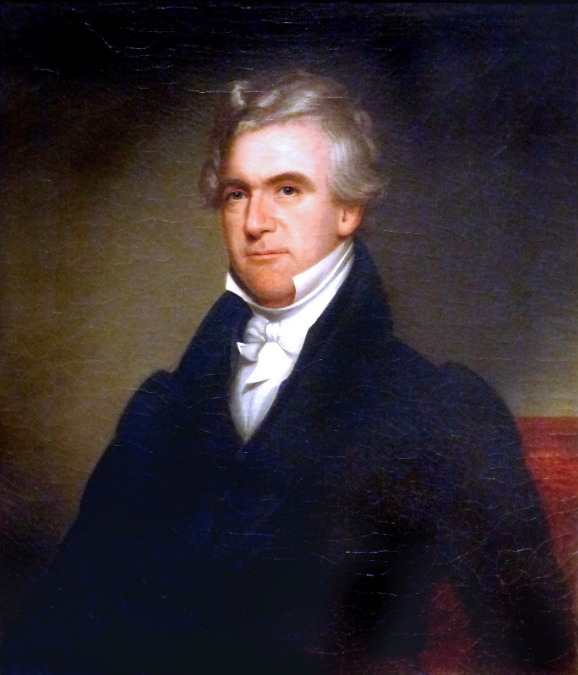
- Portrait by John Wesley Jarvis, 1827
- Born: October 10, 1777; Chester County, Pennsylvania, U.S.
- Died: April 2, 1839 (aged 61); Wilmington, Delaware, U.S.
- Resting place: Wilmington and Brandywine Cemetery
- Occupations: Journalist, editor, publisher

Hezekiah Niles (October 10, 1777 – April 2, 1839) was an American journalist best known as the publisher of the Baltimore-based national weekly news magazine Weekly Register, also known as Niles' Weekly Register or Niles' Register. The most widely circulated magazine of its time, the Register was the nation's first weekly newsmagazine and "exerted a powerful influence on the early national discourse."

== Early life ==
Niles was born near Chadd's Ford in Chester County, Pennsylvania, to a Quaker family, although his father quit the church to fight in the American Revolutionary War. In 1777, the family fled from Wilmington, Delaware, ahead of British forces to the home of James Jefferis on the east side of the Brandywine Creek near Jefferis' Ford. Niles later asserted in the Weekly Register that a Hessian soldier threatened to bayonet his mother while pregnant with him.

== Career ==
The Niles family returned to Wilmington and, after the war, his father rejoined the Quakers. Niles's father died in 1791 when the signpost of his carpenter shop fell on him. At 17, Niles apprenticed with a Philadelphia printer for three years. He then worked in Wilmington for several years, attempting to establish a printing business that went bankrupt in 1801. In 1805 he published a short-lived literary magazine called the Apollo.

Later in 1805, he moved to Baltimore, where until 1811 he edited a daily broadsheet, the Baltimore Evening Post, associated with the Democratic-Republican Party. In 1811, he issued the prospectus for the Weekly Register and had 1,500 subscribers before the first issue had been published. His book Principles and acts of the Revolution in America was first published in 1822.

Niles edited and published the Weekly Register until 1836, making it into one of the most widely circulated magazines in the United States and himself into one of the most influential journalists of his day. The Niles' Weekly Register covered not only politics, but economics, science, technology, art, and literature. In the Register's discourse of politics, Niles used what he called "magnanimous disputation", trying to present the arguments of both sides fairly and objectively, a policy which has made the paper an important source for the history of the period. In his magazine, he also characterized free labor economics as superior to the slave economy and supported the Black colonization movement.

== Peacemaking efforts between the North and South ==
Niles foresaw the possibility of the American Civil War as early as 1820, and published articles in the Register which suggested efforts the South could make in modernizing their economy to a form which was not fully dependent on slavery, publishing efforts which he hoped would help avoid conflict between the North and South. Southern states largely rejected these suggestions that sought to alter their economic dependence on slavery.

== Death and legacy ==
Niles married Anne Ogden. Later in life, Niles was afflicted by a paralytic condition and retired to Wilmington, Delaware, where he died in 1839. The towns of Niles, Michigan, and Niles, Ohio, are named for him. Niles, Illinois may also be named for him, but circumstances are unclear concerning the naming of the surrounding township in 1850.
