= Capuzzi =

Capuzzi is an Italian surname. Notable people with the surname include:

- Antonio Capuzzi (1755–1818), Italian violinist and composer
- Giacomo Capuzzi (1929–2021), Italian Roman Catholic bishop
- Jim Capuzzi (born 1932), American football player
