= Joseph Vitale (author) =

American spiritual teacher and author

Joe Vitale
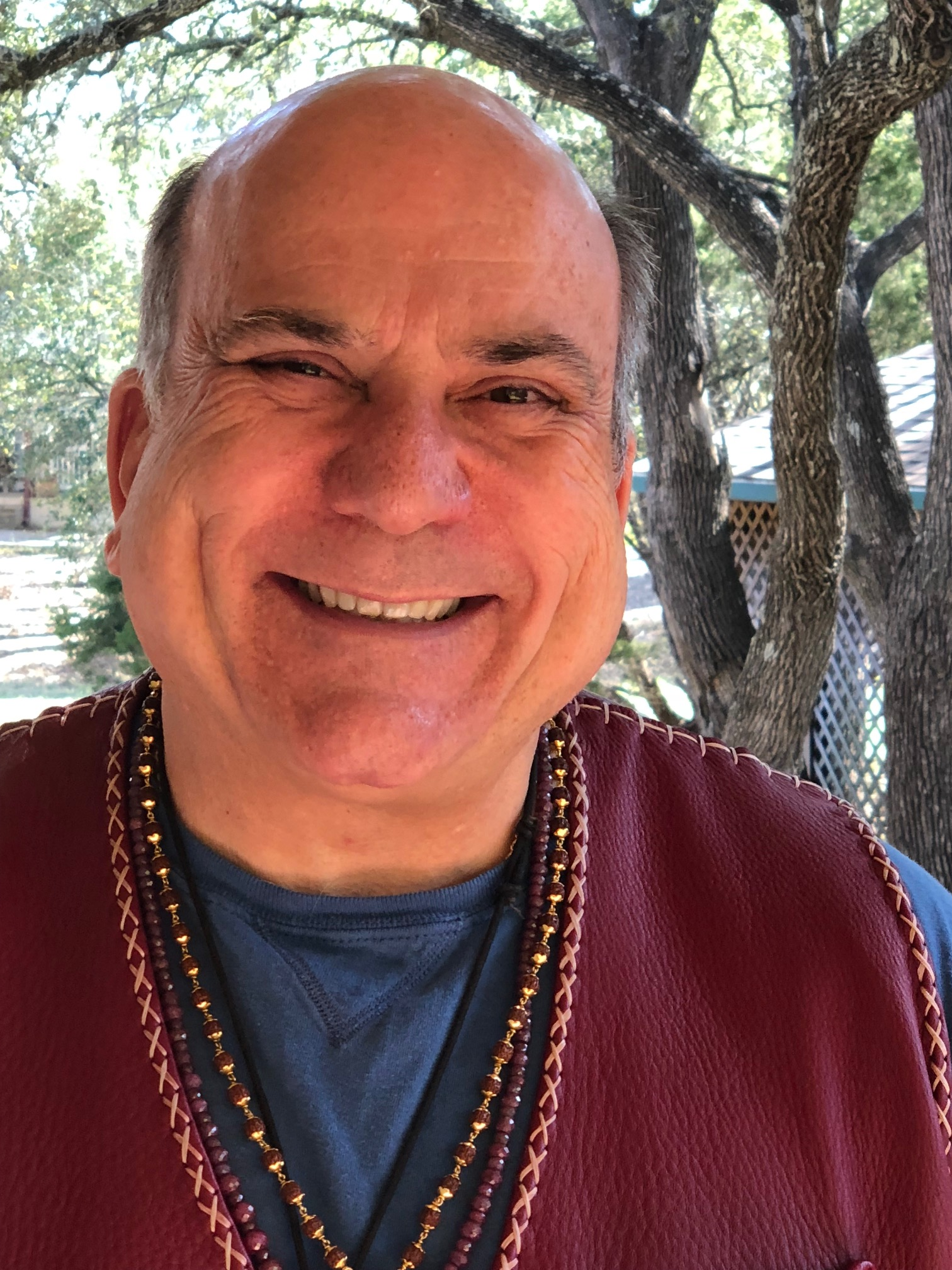
- Born: December 29, 1953 (age 72); Niles, Ohio, U.S.
- Occupations: Author; speaker; musician; marketer; coach
- Notable work: The Attractor Factor (2005) Zero Limits (2008)

Joseph Vitale (born December 29, 1953) is an American author and spiritual teacher best known for his appearance in the Australian-American spirituality documentary, The Secret (2006), and as the author of The Attractor Factor (2009). He currently resides in Austin, Texas.

== Early life ==
Vitale was born in Niles, Ohio, on December 29, 1953, and attended school at Niles McKinley High School.

== Career ==
Vitale moved to Kent, Ohio, to attend college at Kent State University before beginning his career as a copywriter in Houston, Texas. In 1984, Vitale wrote his first book "Zen and the Art of Writing". In 1995, Vitale wrote "Hypnotic Writing". His professional clients have included the Red Cross, PBS, Children's Memorial Hermann Hospital, and several other businesses.

Vitale has made appearances in several movies as an expert on the Law of Attraction including Try It On Everything, The Opus, Leap!, The Search for a Balanced Life, The Compass, and Discover the Gift.

The Miracles coaching program, which was created by Vitale to help guide students through the processes of the Law of Attraction, has been featured on Larry King Live.

He has released more than 15 music CDs.

== Author background ==
Vitale’s first book, Zen and the Art of Writing was published in 1984. Some of his other publications include: The Attractor Factor, Life’s Missing Instruction Manual, The Key, and Faith. Vitale also recorded many audio programs for Nightingale-Conant. Vitale has also written a book on P.T. Barnum’s business secrets, There’s a Customer Born Every Minute.

In 2005, he became a bestselling author when he wrote The Attractor Factor: 5 Easy Steps for Creating Wealth (or Anything Else) From the Inside Out.

Vitale has written books on marketing and business including Hypnotic Writing: How to Seduce and Persuade Customers with Only Your Words and Buying Trances: A New Psychology of Sales and Marketing. Vitale also wrote The Secret Prayer which was released on May 18, 2015.

From 2016 to 2018, Vitale wrote multiple books including: The Miracle: Six Steps to Enlightenment (2016), Law of Attraction Quotes (2017), and the most recent book that Vitale has published, Anything Is Possible. (2018)

== The Secret ==
The film The Secret, in which Vitale is interviewed, was released on March 23, 2006.

Vitale has been featured in several movies throughout his career, including: Try it on Everything, The Opus, Leap!, The Meta Secret and The Abundance Factor.

== Humanitarian work ==
Vitale has worked with Operation Yes (Your Economic Salvation) – a program that offers both mental and financial assistance to end homelessness in the United States.

== Publications and media ==
=== Books ===
- Money Loves Speed: From Stress to Success: Revealing the 8 Laws of Attracting Money Fast (2020)
- Anything Is Possible: 7 Steps for Doing the Impossible (2018)
- The Attractor Factor (2009)
- The Secret Prayer (2009)
- The Miracle: Six steps to Enlightenment (2016)
- Homeless to Billionaire: The 18 Principles of Wealth Attraction and Creating Unlimited Opportunity (2019)
- There's a Customer Born Every Minute: P.T. Barnum's Amazing 10 "Rings of Power" for Creating Fame, Fortune, and a Business Empire Today (2006)
- Zero Limits (2007)
- Hypnotic Writing (1995)
- The Key (2007)
- Expect Miracles: The Missing Secret (2008)
- Buying Trances (2007)
- Meet & Grow Rich (2006)
- The Seven Lost Secrets of Success (1992)
- Instant Manifestation (2011)
- Expect Miracles (2013)
- The Midas Touch (2015)
- The Awakened Millionaire (2016)
- Hypnotic Marketing (2002)
- Advanced Hypnotic Marketing (2003)
- The Miracles Manual (2013)
- The Abundance Manifesto

=== Audio Programs ===
- The Awakening Course
- The Missing Secret
- The Secret to Attracting Money
- The Abundance Paradigm
- The Ultimate Law of Attraction Library
- The Zero Point

=== Singer-songwriter CDs ===
- One More Day
- Strut!
- Sun Will Rise
- The Healing Song
- Reflection
- Stretch
- The Great Something

=== Instrumental CDs ===
- Blue Healer
- At Zero
- Aligning to Zero
- 432 to Zero
- Invoking Divinity
- Afflatus
- Higher Octaves
- Espresso for Your Soul
- Calling the Four Angels of Ho'oponopono

== Television and film ==
Vitale plays a large role in the movie The Secret.

In addition to The Secret, Vitale has been featured in a total of 18 movies so far. Some of them include: Try it on Everything, The Opus, Leap!, The Meta Secret, and his latest film titled The Abundance Factor. He also took on an acting role in the 2018 film, Cecilia.

He was also featured in Newsweek’s March 5, 2007 issue, story titled: Decoding The Secret.
