= Gertrude L. Pew =

American artist

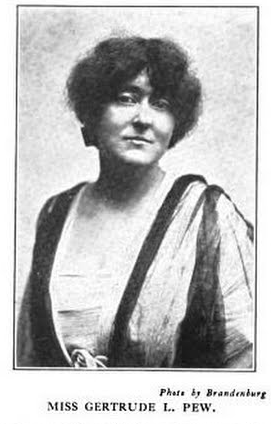
Gertrude L. Pew, from a 1914 publication.

Gertrude L. Pew Robinson (March 25, 1876 – June 28, 1949) was an American artist who specialized in painting miniatures.

== Early life ==
Gertrude L. Pew was born in Niles, Ohio, the daughter of Frederick Horace Pew and Mary Elizabeth Tucker Pew. She trained as an artist at Cleveland School of Art, and in New York City and Paris.

== Career ==
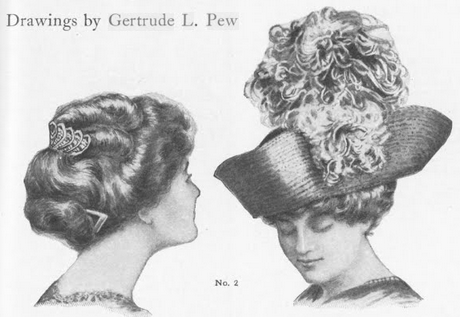
Illustrations by Gertrude L. Pew, from Ladies' Home Companion (March 1912).

Gertrude L. Pew had a studio at 30 W. 57th Street in New York City. "New York has discovered a new miniature artist," commented one syndicated newspaper columnist in 1911, when Tiffany & Co. exhibited her work, crediting writer Robert W. Chambers with the find. Pew painted on ivory, often commissioned to paint portraits of well-known people or their children, including Theodore Roosevelt, Andrew Mellon, J. Pierpont Morgan, Anton Lang, Otis Skinner, and Ethel Roosevelt Derby. Her portrait miniatures of Alicia Dupont and Thomas Platt were displayed at the Philadelphia Water Color Exhibition in 1919.

Pew also made illustrations for Ladies' Home Companion.

== Personal life ==
Gertrude L. Pew married Frederick George Robinson in 1921. She died in 1949, aged 73 years.
