= Jim Capuzzi =

American football player (born 1932)

No. 23, 26
- Position: Defensive back/Quarterback

Personal information
- Born: March 12, 1932; Niles, Ohio, U.S.
- Died: April 9, 2021 (aged 89)
- Listed height: 6 ft 0 in (1.83 m)
- Listed weight: 190 lb (86 kg)

Career information
- High school: McKinley
- College: Marquette; Cincinnati

Career history
- Green Bay Packers (1955–1956)

Career statistics
- Games played: 9
- Interceptions: 2
- Stats at Pro Football Reference

Camillo "Jim" Capuzzi (March 12, 1932 - April 9, 2021) was a former defensive back and quarterback in the National Football League.

== Biography ==
Capuzzi was born on March 12, 1932, in Niles, Ohio.

== Career ==
Capuzzi played with the Green Bay Packers for two seasons (1955–56). He played at the collegiate level at University of Cincinnati and Marquette University.
