= Joseph G. Butler Jr. =

American industrialist, philanthropist and historian

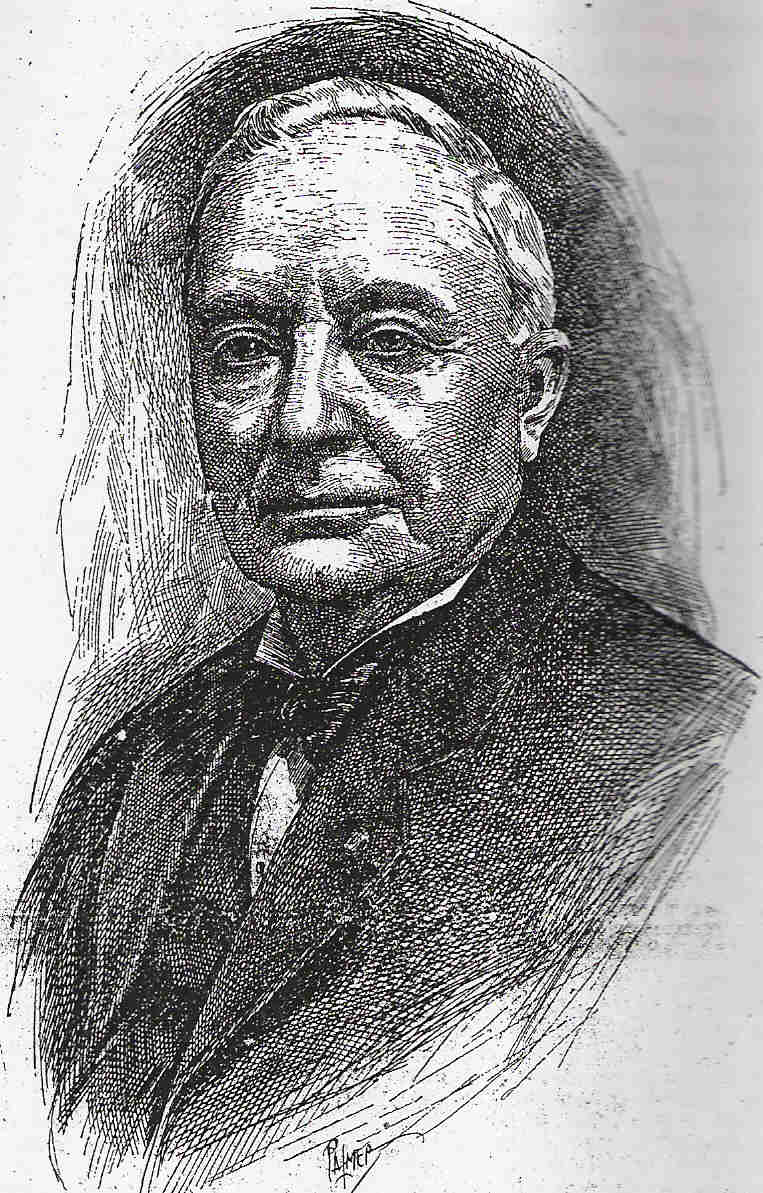
- Born: December 21, 1840; Mercer County, Pennsylvania
- Died: December 20, 1927 (aged 86); Youngstown, Ohio
- Occupation: Industrialist
- Known for: Butler Institute of American Art
- Title: Director, American Iron and Steel Institute

Joseph Green Butler Jr. (December 21, 1840 – December 20, 1927) was an American industrialist, philanthropist, and popular historian. He is remembered primarily for establishing the first museum in the United States dedicated solely to American art.

== Early years ==
He was born in the industrial town of Temperance Furnace, Mercer County, Pennsylvania, the son of Joseph Green and Temperance (Orwig) Butler. His family's presence in the country is traced back to the period preceding the American Revolution. Joseph G. Butler Jr.'s Anglo-Irish ancestors emigrated from the vicinity of Dublin to colonial America in 1759. According to Joseph G. Butler Jr.'s obituary, his father, Joseph Green Butler, was a "widely known iron manufacturer and blast furnace expert". His grandfather, Joseph Butler, established the first blast furnace in central Pennsylvania. When Butler was still a child, his family relocated to Niles, Ohio, where he attended a village school along with future president William McKinley.

== Industrial career ==
Butler became involved in the iron business at the age of 30. In time, his industrial activities centered on Youngstown, Ohio, where he became a pivotal figure in the community's transition from iron to steel production. In 1892, he joined local industrialist Henry Wick in the organization of the Ohio Steel Company, which built two Bessemer plants along the Mahoning River, just northwest of Youngstown. The company went into production in 1895, only to be sold four years later to the Pittsburgh-based National Steel Company. In 1901, the local plant became the Ohio Works of the Carnegie Steel Company, part of the U.S. Steel Corporation.

Butler's influence extended well beyond Ohio, however. By the early 20th century, he was a nationally known industrialist who served as director of the American Iron and Steel Institute, president of the Portage Silica Company, and a director of the Youngstown Sheet and Tube Company, Pennsylvania & Lake Erie Dock Company, Youngstown and Suburban Railway Company, Pennsylvania and Ohio Power & Light Company, and Commercial National Bank of Youngstown. Among American industrialists, he was known affectionately as "Uncle Joe".

== Civic contributions ==
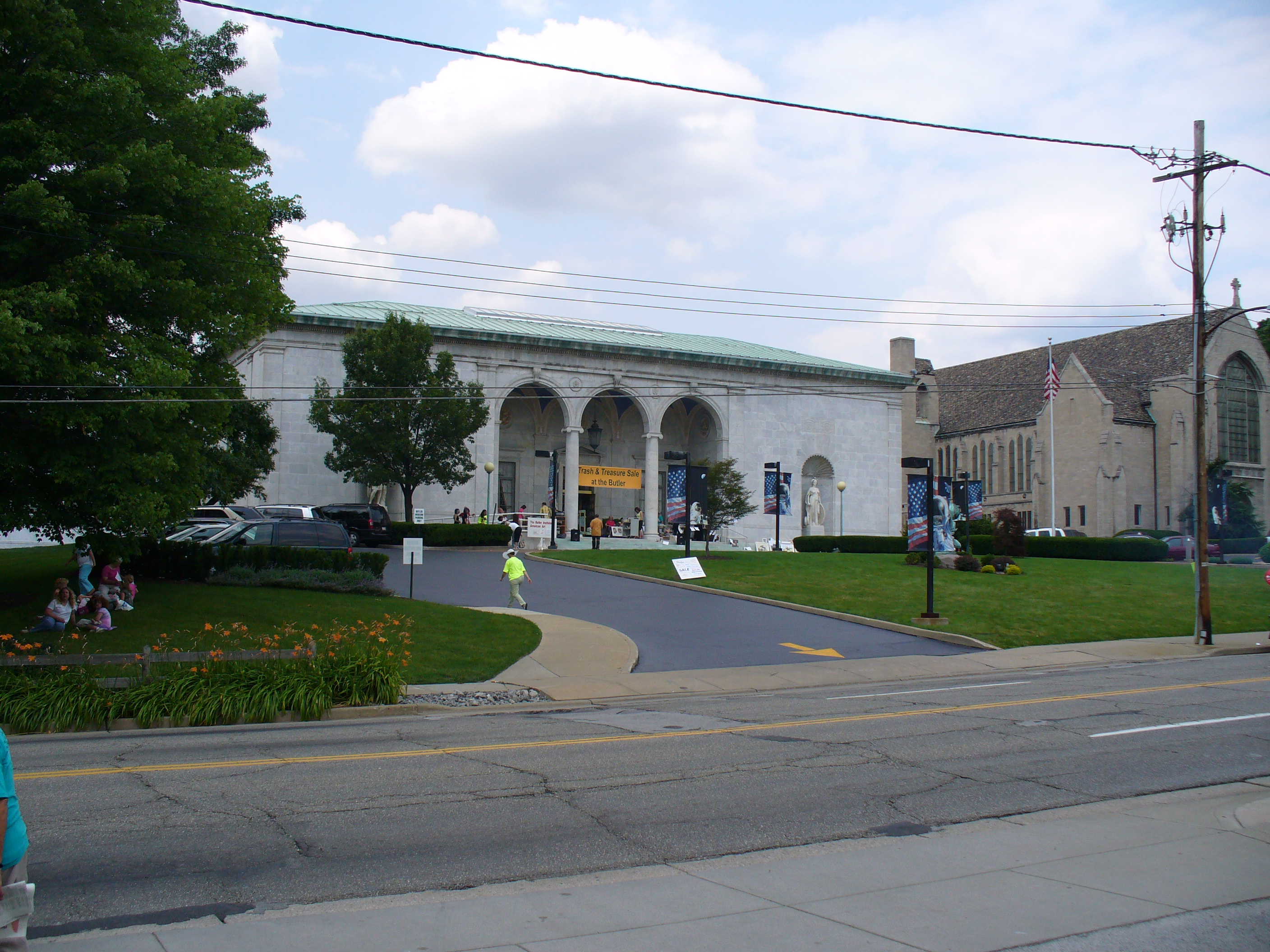
Butler Institute of American Art

Butler's most celebrated legacy is the Butler Institute of American Art, located near the modern-day campus of Youngstown State University. He established the institution in 1919, to house his personal collection of American art. The industrialist's commitment to this groundbreaking museum was reflected in his last will and testament. According to contemporary news accounts, Butler left the bulk of his $1,500,000 estate to the Butler Institute.

Scarcely more than three decades after Butler's death, Time magazine published a feature story which described the art museum as "booming". In a passage that praised the late industrialist's vision as well as its realization, the magazine's editors wrote: "To set the strictly American tone of the place, he planted a befeathered bronze Indian in front of the $500,000 colonnaded building designed by the Manhattan firm of McKim, Mead & White. With Youngstown University nearby, the two blocks surrounding the museum soon developed into the cultural strip of the U.S.'s third biggest steel center".

As a philanthropist and community leader, Butler was also instrumental in the conception and realization of other civic projects, including Niles' National McKinley Birthplace Memorial, a monument to the memory of his personal friend, President William J. McKinley. In addition, Butler was the author of several well-received historical works, including an overview of the development of the U.S. steel industry, a history of the Mahoning Valley, and a biography of President McKinley. His published works also include a volume titled, Presidents I Have Seen and Known. Butler was personally acquainted with every U.S. president from Abraham Lincoln to Calvin Coolidge.

== Death ==
Joseph G. Butler Jr. died on the eve of his 87th birthday. A memorial service held at the Butler Institute of American Art featured a eulogy delivered by Youngstown educator O. L. Reid. The speaker highlighted Butler's rare combination of pragmatism and artistic sensibility when he stated, "His fathers were iron masters and surely in some of them must have been a keen rush of joy before the sheer beauty of the white flame of their furnaces". Butler's funeral services were held at St. John's Episcopal Church, in Youngstown, and his remains were interred at Belmont Park Cemetery, in nearby Liberty, Ohio.
