= Weekly Register =

Baltimore-based national weekly news magazine

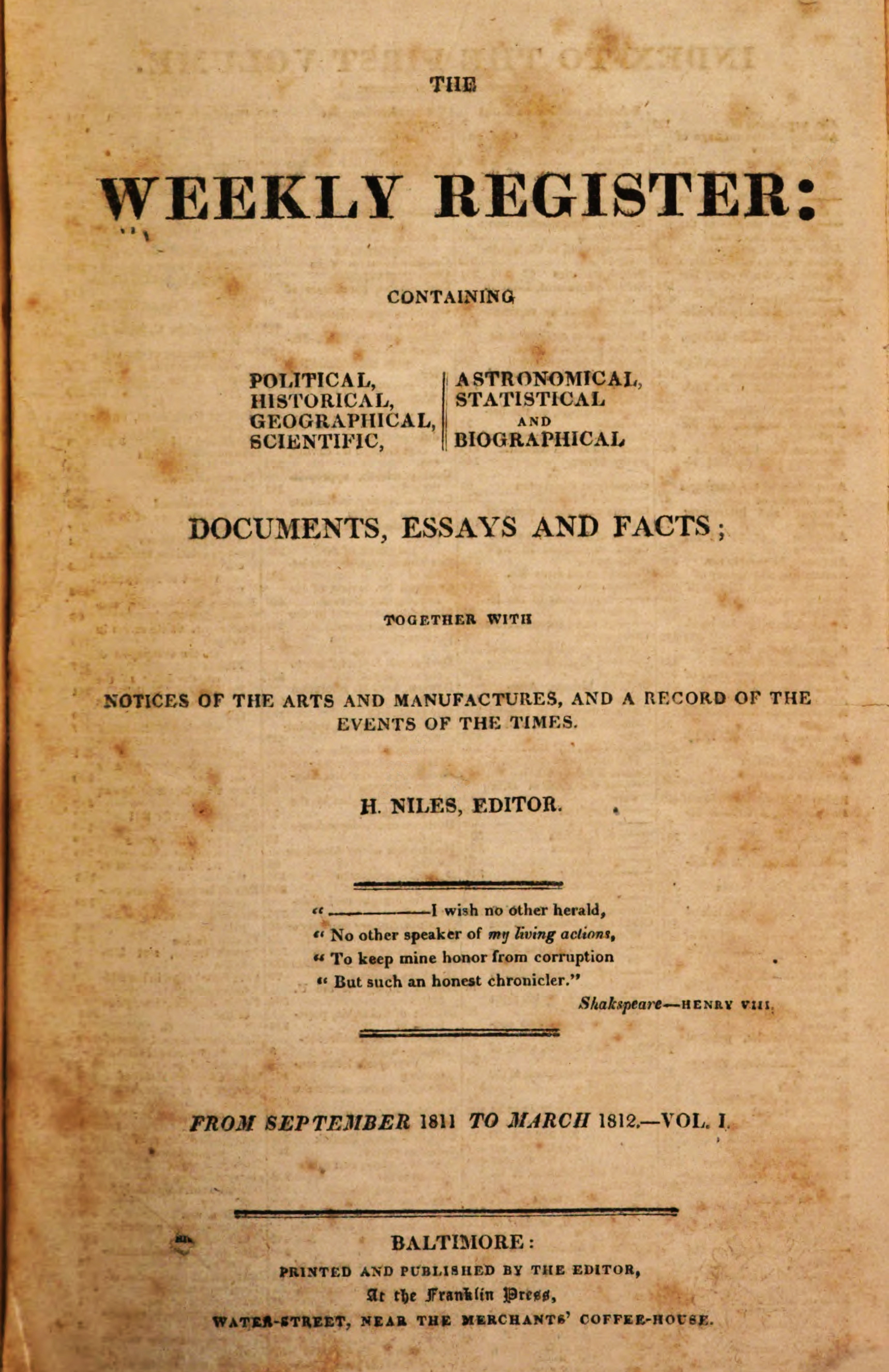
- Cover page for the first volume
- Frequency: Weekly
- Founder: Hezekiah Niles
- Founded: 1811
- Final issue: 1848
- Based in: Baltimore, Maryland, U.S.
- ISSN: 2156-3616

The Weekly Register (also called the Niles Weekly Register and Niles' Register) was a national magazine published in Baltimore, Maryland by Hezekiah Niles from 1811 to 1848. The most widely circulated magazine of its time, the Register was the nation's first weekly newsmagazine and "exerted a powerful influence on the early national discourse." Niles was Baltimore's most prominent citizen at the time.

As of the time of publication of volume 36, the magazine was headquartered at "Water Street, east of South Street."

== History ==
Niles apprenticed as a printer in Philadelphia, eventually moving to Wilmington, Delaware to start a magazine. His partner in that venture, however, ran off with the money, leaving him destitute. He moved on, establishing first a newspaper and then the Register in Baltimore. The magazine's content included coverage of the War of 1812, among other offerings.

After the Register had been in publication eight years, Niles decided in 1818 to offer an index for all twelve volumes published in that period. He hired young writer and critic, John Neal to read all twelve volumes, noting the location of salient topics throughout each article. Neal worked sixteen hours a day, seven days a week, for more than four months on the project, which he called "about the dreariest and heaviest drudgery mortal man was ever tried with," and that Niles claimed was "the most laborious work of the kind that ever appeared in any country." For producing the 254-page index, Niles paid Neal $200 plus a $100 bound copy of the volumes he indexed. (Note: $300 in 1818 was approximately equal to eighteen months' wages for a laborer at the time and is approximately equal to $6,310 in present terms.)

The magazine ceased publication in 1848.
