= John Hlay =

American football player (1930–2022)

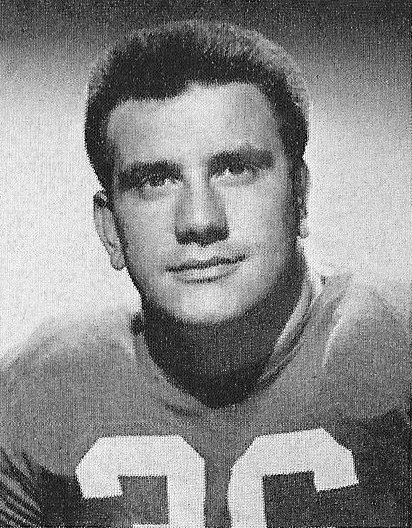

Profile
- Position: Running back

Personal information
- Born: May 21, 1930 (age 96); Niles, Ohio, U.S.
- Died: February 11, 2022 (aged 91)

Career information
- High school: Niles McKinley (OH)
- College: Ohio State (1960–1963)
- NFL draft: 1953: 16th round, 187th overall pick

Career history
- 1953-1954: Green Bay Packers

John Michael Hlay was an American college football running back. He was a fullback and linebacker for the Ohio State University Buckeyes from 1950 to 1952.

== Personal life ==
John Hlay was born on May 21, 1930 in Niles, Ohio. Hlay attended Niles McKinley High School. He was heavily recruited by colleges and narrowly chose Ohio State over Purdue University after Ohio State head coach Wes Fesler played on Hlay's state loyalties.

After retiring from the NFL, Hlay had become a restaurateur and bar-owner, Over his career, Hlay owned three different bars. He also worked in remodeling.

His daughter Jill Hlay was a world-class swimmer, winning a bronze medal in the 100 meters backstroke at the 1971 Pan Am Games.

John Hlay died on February 11, 2022, at the age of 91.

== College Career ==
As a sophomore Hlay lettered as a backup fullback and linebacker on the 1950 Ohio State team. He suffered academic setbacks prior to his junior year, and incoming head coach Woody Hayes benched him for the first three games of the 1951 season following a bar fight. When Hlay returned to the field in the fourth game of the season it was as a defensive replacement, playing exclusively as linebacker. Hlay returned to the offensive backfield in his senior year, in part due to the support of backfield coach Doyt Perry.

As a senior Hlay led the Buckeyes in rushing, despite a backfield loaded with such talent as freshman Howard "Hopalong" Cassady, sophomore Bobby Watkins, and senior Fred Bruney. Hlay's highest single-game rushing total was a 135-yard performance in a 21-14 loss to Purdue on October 4, 1952.

== Professional Career ==
Hlay was drafted 187th overall in the 16th round by the Green Pay Packers 1953 NFL draft. Hlay deferred reporting to Green Bay in 1953 but arrived the following year. The Green Bay staff had intended to play Hlay at linebacker but filled that need in the 1954 draft with Art Hunter out of Notre Dame University.

Green Bay traded Hlay to the New York Giants in 1955, but an ankle injury prevented him from joining the team.

Preceded by Vic Janowicz	Ohio State Buckeyes rushing leader 1952	Succeeded by Bobby Watkins
