= McKinley Birthplace Home and Research Center =

Coordinates: 41°10′47″N 80°45′56″W

The McKinley Birthplace Home and Research Center is a reconstruction of a home on the site of the birth of America's twenty-fifth President, William McKinley, in Niles, Ohio.

== History ==
=== Original structure ===
President William McKinley was born in a small wood plank sided home in Niles on January 29, 1843. The original two-story eight-room house had a total of approximately 924 square feet (86 m^{2}), and was moved twice before it was destroyed by fire in 1937.

=== Rebuilding efforts ===
In 1994, a local bank donated the former McKinley Bank Building that stood on the site of the birthplace to the city of Niles. By 1999, with $83,000 secured from the state of Ohio, the McKinley Bank Building was demolished, leading the way for construction of a replica McKinley birthplace.

The McKinley Memorial Library was granted the site at 40 South Main Street in 2001, and quickly acquired one additional lot for the future Birthplace Home and Research Center. Demolition on the remaining lot commenced in the fall of that year.

Youngstown, Ohio-based architecture firm Olsavsky-Jaminet headed design efforts, aided by DSV Builders as general contractors.

Groundbreaking for the new structure was held on April 28, 2002; the new facility opened to the public after a dedication ceremony held on May 4, 2003, attended by several local government officials, at which the site was presented with an Ohio Historical Marker.

== Current status ==
The two-story structure is physically larger and only bears a slight resemblance to historic photographs of McKinley's actual birthplace. The current facility houses a library of McKinley materials, a gift shop, meeting space, and a computer lab.

According to the Home & Research Center's Web site, it is open to the public from 10am-12pm and 1pm-4pm on Mondays and Wednesdays.

== See also ==
- McKinley at Home, Canton, Ohio
- List of residences of presidents of the United States
