= Niles, Ohio =

- City
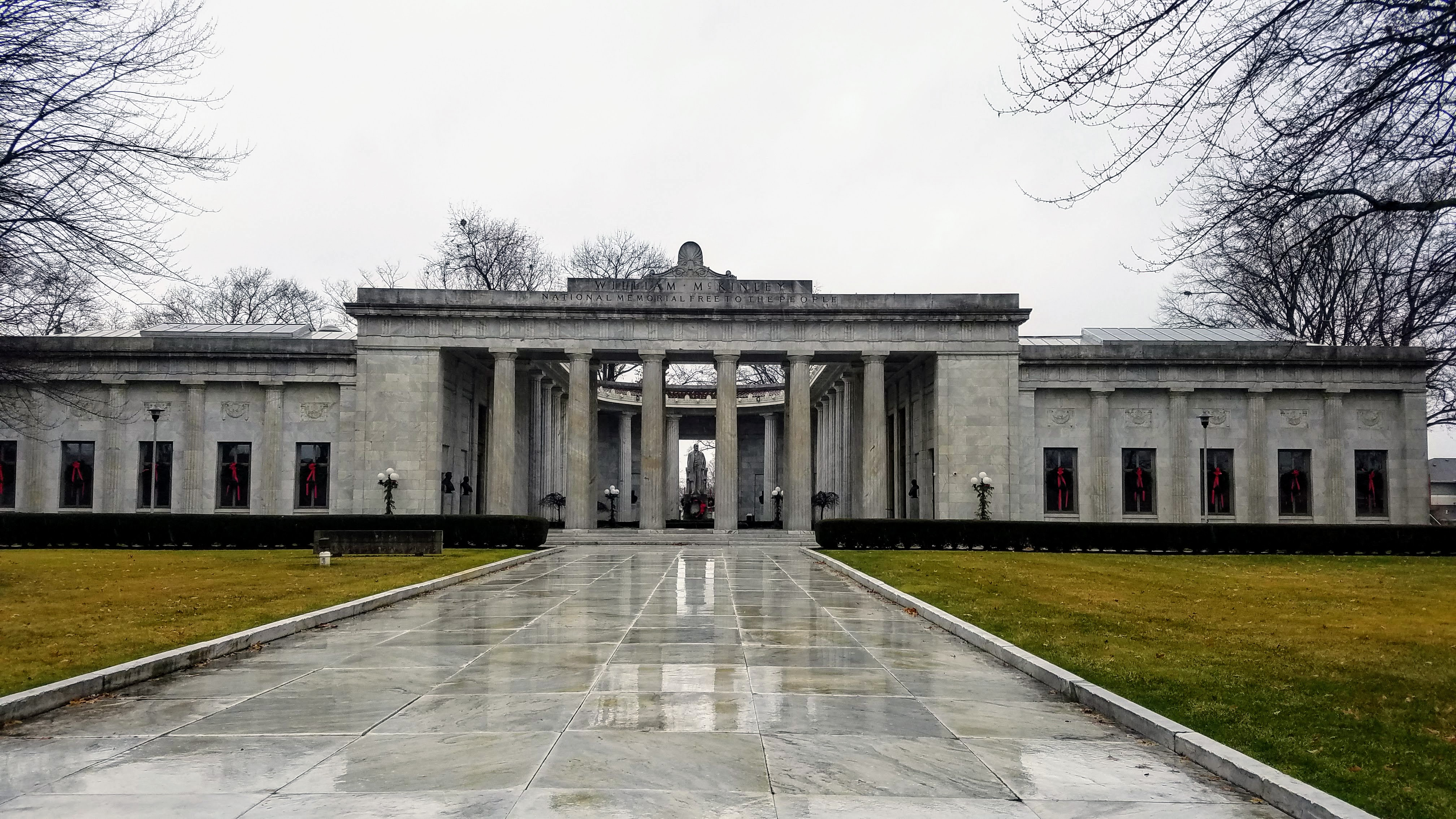
- National McKinley Birthplace Memorial

- Seal
- Motto: "An Ohio City with a Proud Past and a Vision for the Future"
- Interactive map of Niles, Ohio
- Location within Ohio Location within the United States
- Coordinates: 41°11′20″N 80°44′50″W
- Country: United States
- State: Ohio
- County: Trumbull
- Established: 1806
- Named for: Hezekiah Niles

Area
  - Total: 8.60 sq mi (22.28 km^{2})
  - Land: 8.59 sq mi (22.24 km^{2})
  - Water: 0.015 sq mi (0.04 km^{2})
- Elevation: 899 ft (274 m)

Population (2020)
  - Total: 18,443
  - Density: 2,147.8/sq mi (829.27/km^{2})
- Time zone: UTC−5 (Eastern (EST))
  - Summer (DST): UTC−4 (EDT)
- ZIP code: 44446
- Area code: 330, 234
- FIPS code: 39-55916
- GNIS feature ID: 2395235
- Website: thecityofniles.com

Niles is a city in Trumbull County, Ohio, United States. The population was 18,443 at the 2020 census. Located at the confluence of the Mahoning River and Mosquito Creek, Niles is a suburb in the Youngstown–Warren metropolitan area, and roughly halfway between the two principal cities.

Niles is best known as the birthplace of William McKinley, the 25th president of the United States. Located in the Rust Belt, the city's economy focused initially on iron manufacturing but later diversified to include steel and glass production. After the decline of heavy industry in the region in the 1970s, Niles became a retail hub for the northern Mahoning Valley with development centered around the Eastwood Mall complex and along the U.S. Route 422 corridor. The Mahoning Valley Scrappers baseball team plays at 7 17 Credit Union Field at Eastwood in Niles.

== History ==
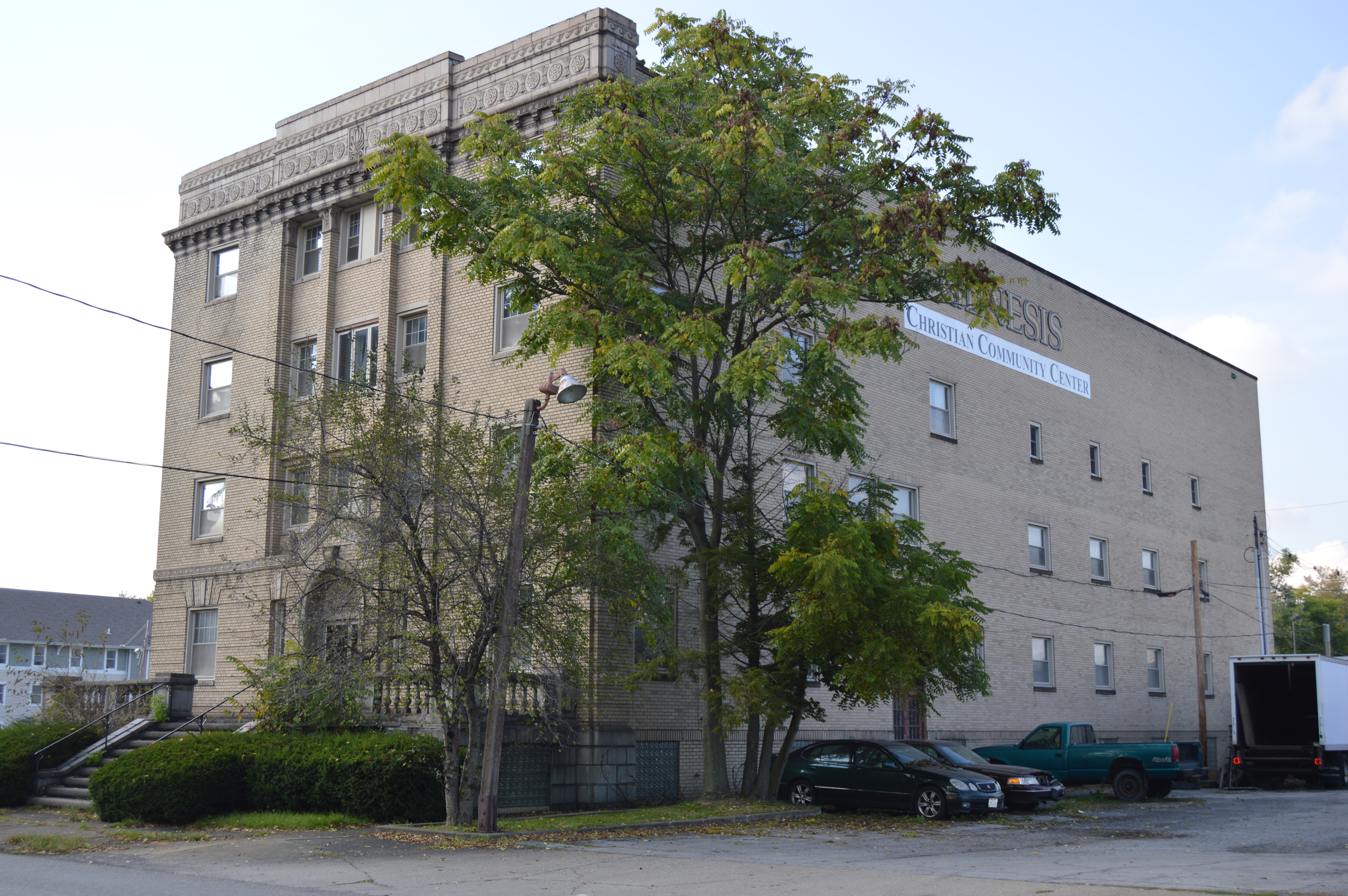
Niles Masonic Temple

Niles was founded in 1806 by James Heaton, who owned one of the first iron-ore processing plants in Ohio. The town originally went by the name of Heaton's Furnace but was later renamed Nilestown after Hezekiah Niles, editor of the influential Weekly Register news magazine. The name was shortened to Niles in 1843. In the early 19th century, Heaton built a forge and, later, a charcoal blast furnace in the area just east of what is now the city's central park, on the west side of Mosquito Creek. Heaton is credited with producing the first bar iron in Ohio.

Niles' iron industry thrived until the late 19th century, when the economic depression of 1873 brought about the closure of the community's largest industrial firm, James Ward and Company. Plans to restore the local iron industry floundered because of the exorbitant cost of modernizing outdated mills. By the early 1900s, however, Niles was the site of companies including Ohio Galvanizing, Sykes Metal, the Niles Glass Works of the General Electric Company, and the Niles Iron and Steel Roofing Company. Between 1900 and 1920, the city's population swelled from 7,500 to over 13,000. The Great Flood of 1913 precipitated massive flooding of the Mahoning River, leaving extensive damage exceeding $3 million and 428 casualties in Niles.

Throughout much of the late 19th and 20th centuries, Niles was known to most Ohioans as the birthplace of William McKinley, the 25th president of the United States. McKinley was born in Niles on January 29, 1843, and attended Niles High School before graduating from Poland Seminary. President McKinley's assassination in 1901 shocked the nation and particularly saddened residents of northeastern Ohio. In 1915, Youngstown industrialist Joseph G. Butler, Jr., a childhood friend of McKinley, campaigned for the construction of the National McKinley Birthplace Memorial in downtown Niles. The facility currently houses the community's library as well as a small museum.

Niles' location in the Mahoning Valley, a center of steel production, ensured that the community would become a destination for immigrants from Southern and Eastern Europe in the early 20th century; dramatic demographic change fueled ethnic and religious tension. In the 1920s, regional chapters of the Ku Klux Klan targeted Niles because of its large Catholic population. The Klan marched through the center of Niles in May 1924 and attempted another march in June of the same year. When violence forced the Klan to cancel the second march, the event was rescheduled for November 1, 1924. The city mayor's ultimate decision to issue the Klan a permit for the march outraged many of the community's Italian- and Irish-American residents.

In response to the scheduled Klan march, an anti-Klan organization, the Knights of the Flaming Circle, pledged to hold their own parade of 10,000 participants on the same day. On October 29, the mayor's house was bombed due to his refusal to revoke the permit. Tensions escalated from this point on, and the city gained national attention due to the impending marches. Despite the city's pleas for assistance from the militia, they were denied. The result was 18 hours of full-blown rioting. Control was brought to the town, requiring 10 days of martial law. Between the Klan and anti-Klan participants, 104 people were indicted.

Niles' economy was undermined in the 1970s when the Mahoning Valley's steel industry – already in decline – collapsed.

On May 31, 1985, Niles was struck by an F5 tornado that had its origins just west of Newton Falls, where it destroyed much of that town. The tornado then moved through Lordstown and Warren, before wreaking havoc on Niles, where it flattened a roller skating rink and shopping mall. The tornado also leveled dozens of houses, ripped through the city's historic Union Cemetery, injured many people, and took several lives. In the Niles area, nine people were killed and 250 were injured. Nearly 70 homes were leveled and another 65 to 70 were severely damaged. The tornado of 1985 took a path through Niles that was almost identical to that of a tornado that struck in 1947.

== Geography ==
According to the United States Census Bureau, the city has a total area of 8.63 square miles (22.35 km^{2}), of which 8.61 square miles (22.30 km^{2}) is land and 0.02 square miles (0.05 km^{2}) is water.

== Demographics ==
Historical population
Census	Pop.	Note	%±
1880	3,879		—
1890	4,280		10.3%
1900	7,468		74.5%
1910	8,361		12.0%
1920	13,080		56.4%
1930	16,314		24.7%
1940	16,273		−0.3%
1950	16,773		3.1%
1960	19,545		16.5%
1970	21,581		10.4%
1980	23,072		6.9%
1990	21,128		−8.4%
2000	20,932		−0.9%
2010	19,266		−8.0%
2020	18,443		−4.3%

Niles hosts a large Italian-American community. The local center of Italian-American culture and tradition is Our Lady of Mount Carmel Catholic Church. The church hosts an annual celebration of the feast day of Our Lady of Mount Carmel during July.

=== 2020 census ===
As of the 2020 census, Niles had a population of 18,443. The median age was 44.5 years. 18.2% of residents were under the age of 18 and 22.8% of residents were 65 years of age or older. For every 100 females there were 92.0 males, and for every 100 females age 18 and over there were 88.1 males age 18 and over.

99.5% of residents lived in urban areas, while 0.5% lived in rural areas.

There were 8,609 households in Niles, of which 21.7% had children under the age of 18 living in them. Of all households, 32.5% were married-couple households, 23.4% were households with a male householder and no spouse or partner present, and 35.3% were households with a female householder and no spouse or partner present. About 39.7% of all households were made up of individuals and 17.1% had someone living alone who was 65 years of age or older.

There were 9,524 housing units, of which 9.6% were vacant. The homeowner vacancy rate was 2.8% and the rental vacancy rate was 10.0%.

Racial composition as of the 2020 census
Race	Number	Percent
White	16,105	87.3%
Black or African American	873	4.7%
American Indian and Alaska Native	26	0.1%
Asian	155	0.8%
Native Hawaiian and Other Pacific Islander	1	0.0%
Some other race	135	0.7%
Two or more races	1,148	6.2%
Hispanic or Latino (of any race)	428	2.3%

=== 2010 census ===
As of the census of 2010, there were 19,266 people, 8,499 households, and 4,971 families living in the city. The population density was 2,237.6 inhabitants per square mile (863.9/km^{2}). There were 9,417 housing units at an average density of 1,093.7 per square mile (422.3/km^{2}). The racial makeup of the city was 93.1% White, 3.5% African American, 0.2% Native American, 0.7% Asian, 0.3% from other races, and 2.2% from two or more races. Hispanic or Latino of any race were 1.3% of the population.

There were 8,499 households, of which 26.1% had children under the age of 18 living with them, 38.0% were married couples living together, 14.8% had a female householder with no husband present, 5.7% had a male householder with no wife present, and 41.5% were non-families. 35.6% of all households were made up of individuals, and 14.2% had someone living alone who was 65 years of age or older. The average household size was 2.24 and the average family size was 2.88.

The median age in the city was 42 years. 20.7% of residents were under the age of 18; 8.5% were between the ages of 18 and 24; 24.4% were from 25 to 44; 28.4% were from 45 to 64; and 17.8% were 65 years of age or older. The gender makeup of the city was 47.6% male and 52.4% female.

=== 2000 census ===
As of the census of 2000, there were 20,932 people, 8,859 households, and 5,519 families living in the city. The population density was 2,447.5 inhabitants per square mile (945.0/km^{2}). There were 12,512 housing units at an average density of 1,112.7 per square mile (429.6/km^{2}). The racial makeup of the city was 95.98% White, 2.27% African American, 0.19% Native American, 0.33% Asian, 0.01% Pacific Islander, 0.22% from other races, and 1.00% from two or more races. Hispanic or Latino of any race were 0.83% of the population.

There were 5,012 households, out of which 26.7% had children under the age of 18 living with them, 45.1% were married couples living together, 13.3% had a female householder with no husband present, and 37.7% were non-families. 32.9% of all households were made up of individuals, and 13.1% had someone living alone who was 65 years of age or older. The average household size was 2.31 and the average family size was 2.95.

In the city, the age distribution of the population shows 22.3% under the age of 18, 8.1% from 18 to 24, 28.0% from 25 to 44, 23.8% from 45 to 64, and 17.9% who were 65 years of age or older. The median age was 40 years. For every 100 females, there were 89.4 males. For every 100 females age 18 and over, there were 85.3 males.

The median income for a household in the city was $65,615, and the median income for a family was $76,704. Males had a median income of $35,936 versus $23,888 for females. The per capita income for the city was $19,410. About 6.5% of families and 9.6% of the population were below the poverty line, including 14.2% of those under age 18 and 5.0% of those age 65 or over.

== Economy ==
Niles is one of the main retail hubs of the Mahoning Valley region. Most of the city's commercial and retail development centers around U.S. Route 422. Eastwood Mall opened in 1969 and contains over 100 stores and restaurants across 1,400,000 sq ft (130,000 m^{2}) of space. The mall is part of a greater complex which includes outdoor strip plazas at the intersection of U.S. Route 422 and Ohio State Route 46.

Real estate developer Cafaro Company, which owns the Eastwood Mall complex, is headquartered in Niles. Historically, the Niles Car and Manufacturing Company built streetcar and interurban cars in the city for national use. It was founded in 1901 and specialized in building wooden-bodied cars in the heyday of interurban building. Niles Firebrick was another manufacturer in the city, from 1872 to 1960.

== Arts and culture ==
The National McKinley Birthplace Memorial Library and Museum in downtown Niles was established in 1915 to remember President William McKinley. Nearby is the McKinley Birthplace Home and Research Center. The Ward-Thomas Museum is the current home of the Niles Historical Society.

== Sports ==
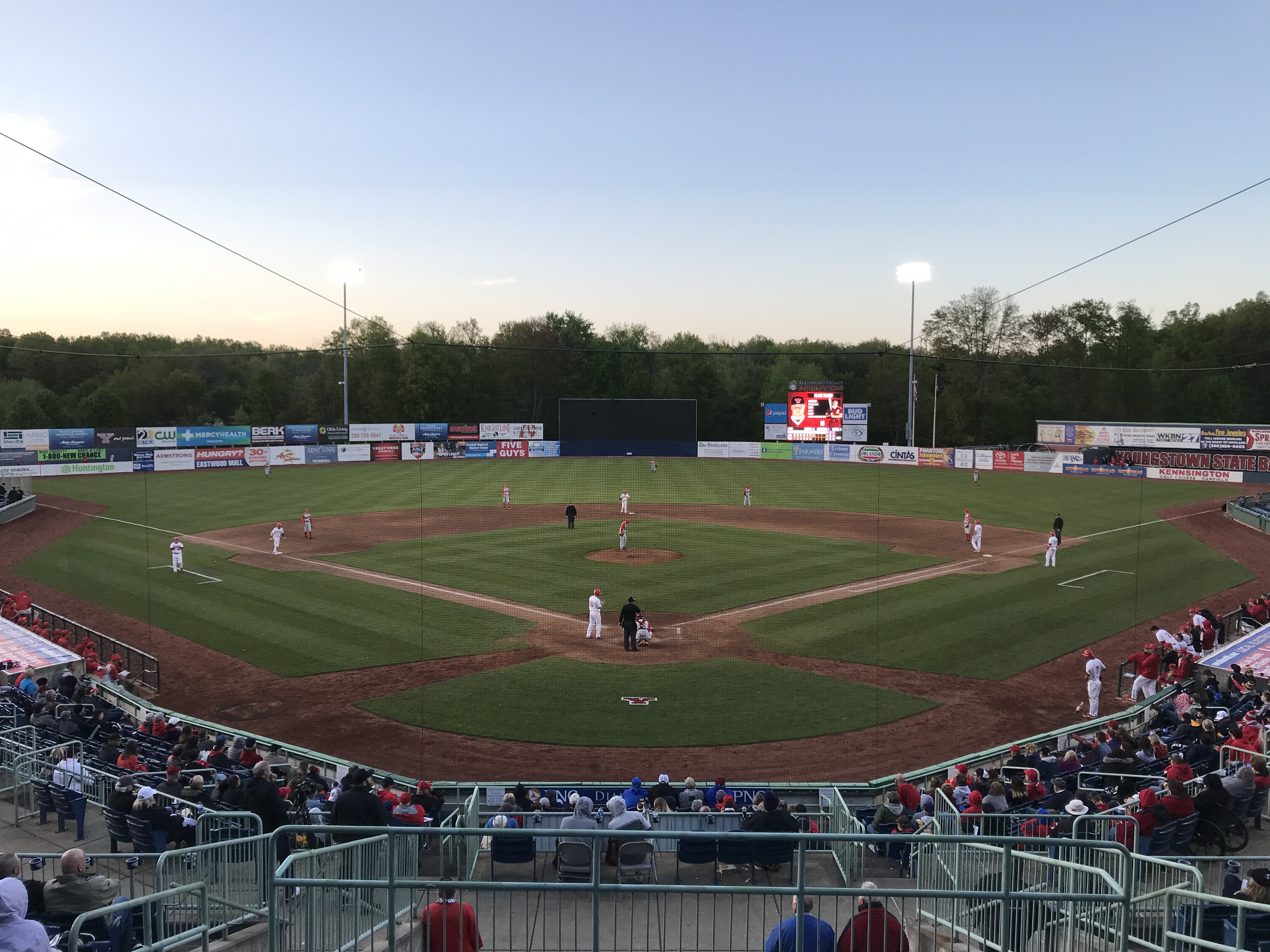
7 17 Credit Union Field at Eastwood, home of the Mahoning Valley Scrappers

The Mahoning Valley Scrappers, a short-season Class A minor league baseball team, moved from Erie, Pennsylvania, to Niles in 1999. The team plays at 7 17 Credit Union Field at Eastwood, located behind the Eastwood Mall on U.S. Route 422.

Youngstown-based boxer Kelly Pavlik fought a nationally broadcast fight in Niles on July 1, 2003, against Rico Cason. The fight was broadcast over ESPN's Tuesday Night Fights, and Pavlik won the fight by knockout in the second round. Between 1980 and 1982, boxer Harry Arroyo fought four of his professional fights in Niles, and won all four of them, bringing his professional record at the time to 16–0. Eventually, Arroyo would win the IBF World Lightweight Title.

== Education ==
Children in Niles are served by the Niles City School District, which includes one primary school, one intermediate school, one middle school and Niles McKinley High School.

== Notable people ==
- Joseph Bangust, World War II naval hero and Navy Cross recipient
- Cynthia S. Burnett, educator, temperance reformer, newspaper editor
- George Burns, professional baseball player and 1926 American League MVP
- Jim Capuzzi, professional football defensive back and quarterback for the Green Bay Packers
- John Hlay, collegiate football player for Ohio State University
- Sonny Horne, professional boxer
- William McKinley, 25th president of the United States
- A. F. Moritz, poet
- Kenneth Patchen, poet and noted figure of the Beat era
- Gertrude L. Pew, miniature painter
- Phil Ragazzo, professional football player
- Bo Rein, Ohio State University football and baseball player
- Tim Ryan, U.S. representative for Ohio from 2003 to 2023
- Dominic Sena, film and music video director
- David Sherman, novelist
- Harry M. Stevens, ballpark concessionaire and purported inventor of the hot dog
