= Youngstown Sheet and Tube =

American steel manufacturer

Youngstown Sheet and Tube Company
- Type: Public
- Industry: Steel
- Founded: November 23, 1900; 125 years ago
- Defunct: September 19, 1977; 49 years ago
- Fate: Closure
- Headquarters: Youngstown, Ohio, U.S.
- Key people: James Anson Campbell, George D. Wick
- Products: Steel
- Number of employees: 27,000 (1950)

The Youngstown Sheet and Tube Company was an American steel manufacturer based in Youngstown, Ohio. Founded in 1900, it was one of the largest steel manufacturers in the United States during the 20th century before going defunct in 1977.

== History ==
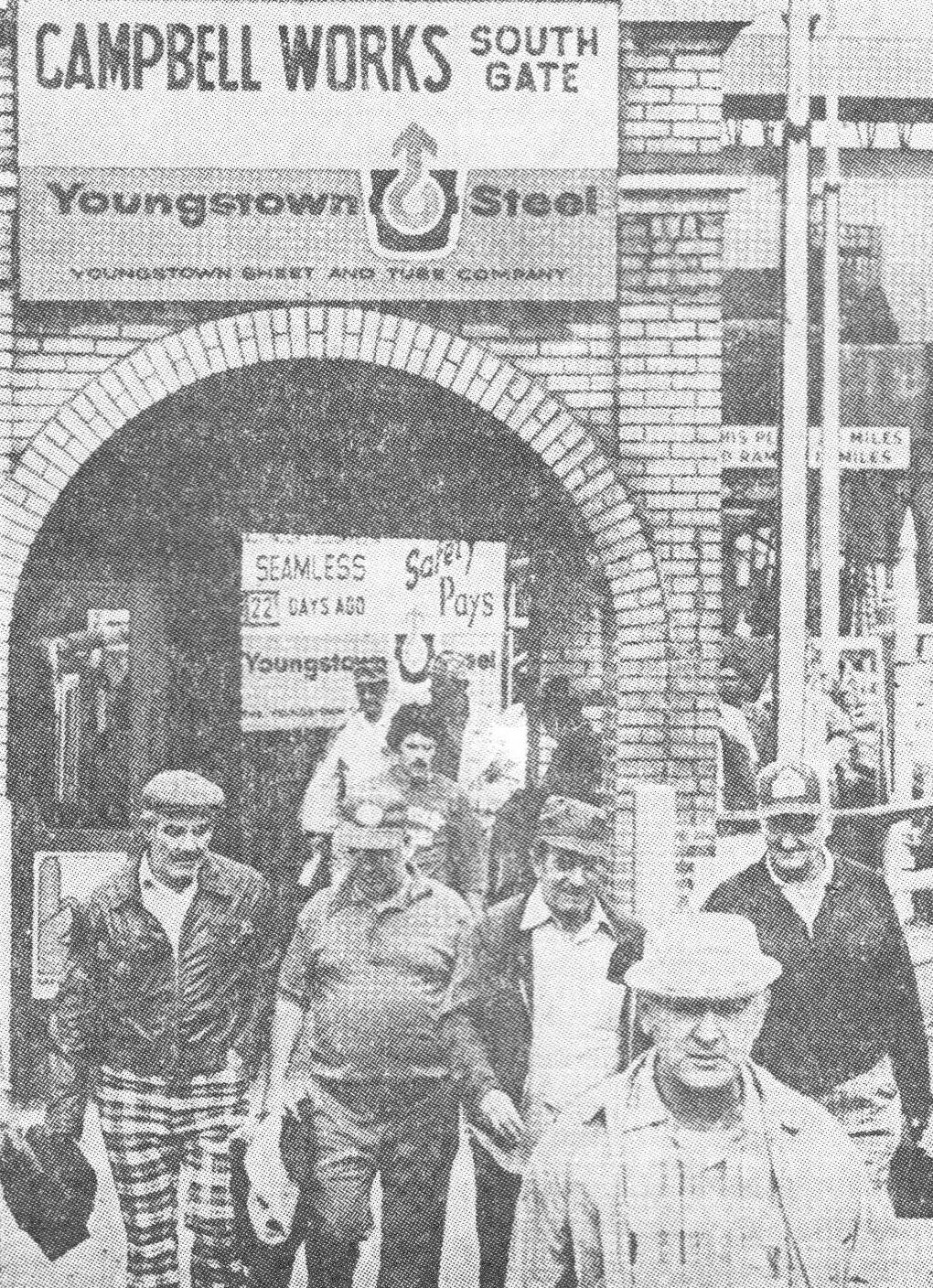
Laid off Youngstown Sheet and Tube workers, 1977

In 1888, Youngstown industrialists George D. Wick and James Anson Campbell organized the Mahoning Valley Iron Company, with Wick as president. Charles Dayton Arms, Wicks brother in law and also an iron entrepreneur, was brought in as president. Five years later, the two men resigned from the firm when it was taken over by the Republic Iron and Steel Company, and their next project would come in response to major changes that occurred in the community's industrial sector. Youngstown's industrial leaders began to convert from iron to steel manufacturing at the turn of the century, a period that also saw a wave of consolidations that placed much of the community's industry in the hands of national corporations. To the rising concern of many area industrialists, U.S. Steel, shortly after its establishment in 1901, absorbed Youngstown's premier steel producer, the National Steel Corporation.

During the previous year, however, Wick and Campbell combined resources with other local investors who wanted to maintain significant levels of local ownership within the city's manufacturing sector. The group established the Youngstown Iron Sheet and Tube Company with $600,000 in capital. Wick, who emerged as the steel company's first president in 1900, appointed Campbell as secretary. The word "Iron" was dropped from the company's name in 1905. Although the company's focus began with sheet and tube, it eventually became one of the nation's most important steel producers with a varied product line.

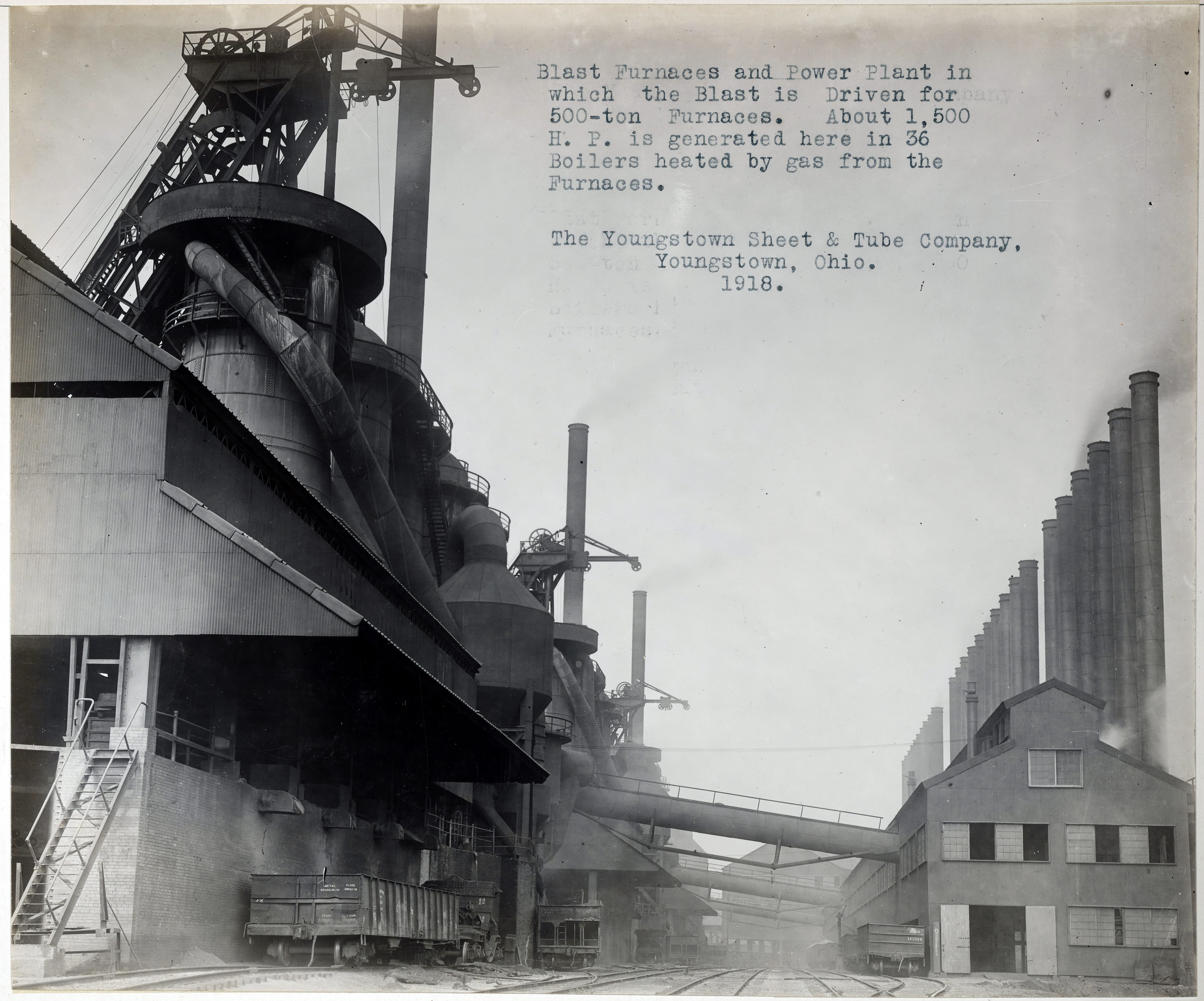
Brier Hill works

In 1923, Youngstown Sheet and Tube purchased the assets of the Brier Hill Steel Company (also located in Youngstown, at Brier Hill), as well as the facilities of the Steel and Tube Company of America in East Chicago and Indiana Harbor, Indiana, making it the fifth-largest steel maker in the United States and the largest employer in the Mahoning Valley. It acquired the Mark Manufacturing Company in the same year.

The home plant of YS&T was known as the Campbell Works, located in Campbell and Struthers, Ohio. This plant contained four blast furnaces, twelve open hearth furnaces, several blooming mills, two Bessemer converters, a slabbing mill, a butt-weld tube mill, a 79-inch (2,000 mm) hot strip mill, seamless tube mills, and 9-inch (230 mm) and 12-inch (300 mm) bar mills at the Struthers Works. The Brier Hill Works consisted of two blast furnaces named Grace and Jeannette, twelve open hearth furnaces, a 40-inch (1,000 mm) blooming mill, a 35-inch (890 mm) intermediate blooming mill, a 24-inch (610 mm) round mill, 84-inch (2,100 mm) and 132-inch (3,400 mm) plate mills, and an electric-weld tube mill. During much of the Depression, the Brier Hill works was shut down, but it reopened in 1937. Much of the reopened plant's production comprised tube rounds for the Campbell seamless tube mills. Due to the imbalance of ironmaking and steelmaking facilities at the two plants, rail shipments of molten iron "hot metal" were sent from Campbell to Brier Hill from 1937 until 1979.

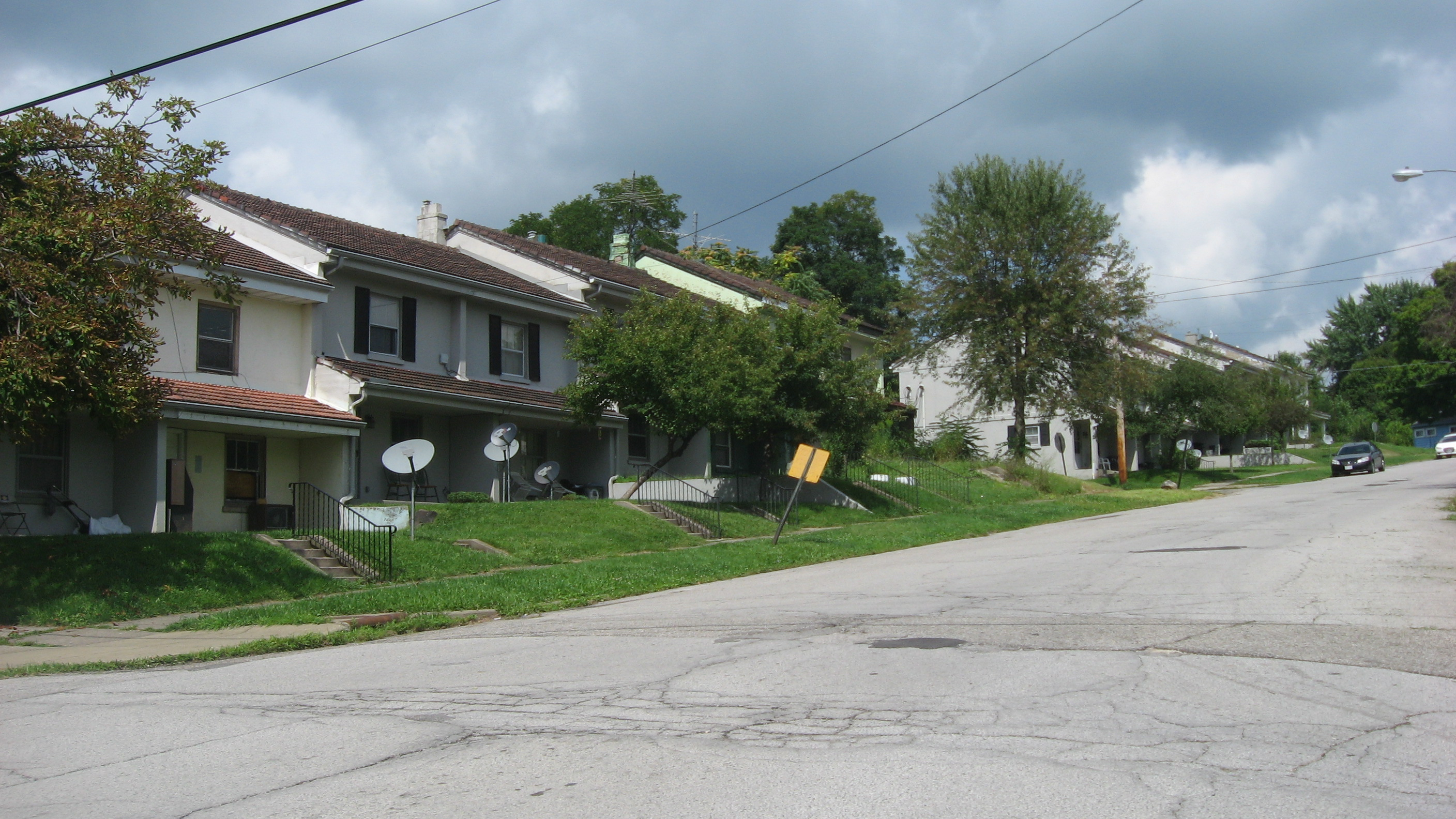
Company housing in Campbell

In 1916, Sheet and Tube workers at the East Youngstown plant rioted during a strike over working conditions, which resulted in most of the town's business district being burned to the ground. The strike was quelled by the arrival of National Guard troops. After the riots, East Youngstown was renamed Campbell in honor of the company's president. In 1937, Youngstown Sheet and Tube played a prominent role in the Little Steel Strike, along with Republic Steel, Inland Steel, Bethlehem Steel, and Weirton Steel. The so-called "Little Steel" group, led by Republic's Tom Girdler, operated independently of United States Steel, which had previously signed a labor agreement with the Congress of Industrial Organizations (CIO) and its subordinate Steel Workers Organizing Committee (SWOC). Violence during this strike resulted in the deaths of workers in Chicago and Youngstown.

In 1952, during the Korean War, President Harry S. Truman attempted to seize American steel mills in order to avert a strike. This led to the U.S. Supreme Court decision of Youngstown Sheet & Tube Co. v. Sawyer, which limited presidential authority.

The company abruptly closed its Campbell Works and furloughed 5,000 workers on September 19, 1977, a day remembered locally as "Black Monday." The Brier Hill Works and the company's plants in Indiana were sold to Jones and Laughlin Steel, later acquired by Ling-Temco-Vought (LTV), a conglomerate. The Brier Hill Works closed in 1979 as part of a continued wave of steel mill closings that devastated the Youngstown economy. The Brier Hill Works was eventually reopened in 1986 by Cargill Corporation, under the name North Star Steel. In 2002, Cargill sold the operations to recycling minimill Vallourec Group, a French conglomerate. The Indiana Harbor mill continues operating, owned by Cleveland-Cliffs.

== Notable employees ==
- Joseph G. Butler, Jr., American industrialist and philanthropist, founder of the Butler Institute of American Art.
- James A. Campbell, first Secretary of the Board, 1900, appointed Company president 1904, President of American Iron and Steel Institute during World War I.
- Pete Mauthe, WWII-era president, elected to College Football Hall of Fame.
- Ernest L. Webster, Los Angeles, California, City Council member, 1927–31.

== See also ==
- Burnet v. Logan
- Steel Valley (Ohio-Pennsylvania)
