= Bob Babich (linebacker) =

American football player (1947–2022)

No. 60
- Position: Linebacker

Personal information
- Born: May 5, 1947; Youngstown, Ohio, U.S.
- Died: April 4, 2022 (aged 74); California, U.S.
- Listed height: 6 ft 2 in (1.88 m)
- Listed weight: 231 lb (105 kg)

Career information
- High school: Memorial (Campbell, Ohio)
- College: Miami (OH)
- NFL draft: 1969: 1st round, 18th overall pick

Career history
- San Diego Chargers (1970–1972); Cleveland Browns (1973–1978)

Awards and highlights
- First-team All-American (1968); MAC Defensive Player of the Year (1968)

Career NFL statistics
- Fumble recoveries: 6
- Interceptions: 6
- Touchdowns: 1
- Sacks: 7
- Stats at Pro Football Reference
- College Football Hall of Fame

Robert Babich (May 5, 1947 – April 4, 2022) was an American professional football player who was a linebacker for nine seasons in the National Football League (NFL) with the San Diego Chargers and the Cleveland Browns. He played college football at Miami University in Oxford, Ohio, and was elected to the College Football Hall of Fame in 1994.

== Early life ==
Babich was born May 5, 1947, the son of Frank Babich, Jr. and mother, Mary (Lisko) Babich. He played high school football for Campbell Memorial High School in Campbell, Ohio, where he also excelled in baseball.

== College career ==
Babich decided to play for coach Bo Schembechler at Miami (Ohio). He was a first-team All-America linebacker for Miami University, known then as the Redskins. He graduated in 1969. He was voted the "Most Valuable Player" award twice by his teammates and selected as Miami's "Athlete of the Year" for the 1968-69 academic year. A two-time unanimous all-Mid-American Conference linebacker, he was also voted the "Defensive Player of the Year" in the MAC as he captained the 1968 team. Babich was selected First-team All-America by the American Football Coaches Association, The Sporting News and Time magazine. He played in the American, North-South and Senior bowls.

== Professional career ==
He was a first-round draft choice of the San Diego Chargers in the 1969 NFL/AFL draft, the 18th selection overall and the second linebacker taken.

In three seasons for the Chargers, he saw action in all 42 regular-season games. On September 6, 1973, he was traded to the Cleveland Browns for a first-round draft choice in 1974 and a second-round pick in 1975. He played six seasons for the Browns, missing only three games (in 1975) during those seasons.

He graduated with a Bachelor of Science in Education.

Babich was inducted into the Miami University Athletics Hall of Fame in 1975. His 1994 election to the College Football Hall of Fame made him the first Miami (Ohio) player to be enshrined.

== Personal life ==
Babich died on April 3, 2022. His wife, Barbara (Caylor), died just a month earlier.
