= Mike Farragher =

American boxer

- Born: January 2, 1871; Youngstown, Ohio
- Died: October 21, 1934; Youngstown, Ohio

Michael Joseph Farragher (January 2, 1871 – October 21, 1934) was an American welterweight boxer from Youngstown, Ohio. In the late 19th and early 20th centuries, Farragher faced opponents in venues such as New York City; Wheeling, West Virginia; Cleveland, Ohio; and Homestead, Pennsylvania.

Early in his career, journalists compared Farragher to legendary prizefighter James J. Corbett, in terms of both his physical appearance and fighting style.

== Early years ==
He was born in the working-class district of Brier Hill, on Youngstown's north side. The Farraghers were actively involved with St. Ann's Roman Catholic Church, and at least two members of the family became well known athletes. Mike Farragher's younger brother, James Farragher, gained recognition as a left tackle on the University of Notre Dame's football team and is credited in official histories as an acting head coach of the "Fighting Irish".

== Boxing career ==
Farragher weighed in at between 122 and 135 pounds and participated in almost 40 fights, with five knockouts to his credit. In a career that lasted from 1891 to 1912, he defeated early champions such as Jim Gallagher, Jeff Powers, Tommy Broderick, Jimmy Reeder, and Stanton Abbott.

He was unable to fight in his hometown throughout 1894, because "local ministers took a united stand against the sport", while "the Catholic Institute barred all persons who had taken part in prize fights". Farragher was evidently undeterred. That year, he defeated Eastern champion Abe Lloyd in a bout of 27 rounds held in Ellwood City, Pennsylvania.

One of his most anticipated matches of 1895 involved English-born fighter John Parry, a resident of Homestead, Pennsylvania.". "At present there is no one in the ring whom Farragher would rather meet than the man Parry", the Youngstown Daily Vindicator reported on June 3, 1895. "According to Farragher, the young Englishman acted unlike a gentleman at a recent meeting Farragher had with [rival fighter James] Callagher, and at which contest Parry was behind Callagher". The following week, the Vindicator noted that Farragher was training for the match at O'Brien's Westake Crossing Gymnasium in Youngstown. "He is reported to be in his usual good shape and says he will have no trouble in getting to weight at the appointed time", the paper added.

In early July, Farragher completed his preparatory training in Pittsburgh, where Parry was said to be "a big favorite" and "considerable money will be wagered". On July 10, 1895, the Vindicator reported that Farragher, "the game and scientific Youngstown light-weight pugilist", had "knocked out" Parry in the 13th round of a "savage" contest held the previous evening in Wheeling, West Virginia. The Vindicator reported that, at the beginning of the final round, "Parry was sent in to knock Farragher out, and it was supposed by Parry's admirers that he could do so". After several of Parry's swings "missed their aim", however, Farragher delivered a powerful right blow to Parry, "who fell like one dead, and amid cheers from the crowd was counted out".

An obituary indicates that Farragher's career peaked between 1902 and 1906. He retired after defeating opponent Phil Cassidy in a fight held in Youngstown, on February 12, 1912.

== Personal life ==
Farragher was married on November 10, 1894, though this fact was not widely publicized until August 1895. His bride was the former Rose Daley, a native of neighboring Warren, Ohio, who was described by the Vindicator as "an accomplished young lady, possessing a large number of friends". The Vindicator added that the secrecy surrounding the marriage ceremony had been purposeful. "It was the intention to keep the matter a secret, and how well they succeeded is fully demonstrated by the fact that until today nobody except the immediate relatives of the contracting parties and the witnesses were aware of it". The couple eventually had two daughters.

== Later years ==
After leaving the ring, Farragher established a "popular" tavern on Commerce Street, in downtown Youngstown. The business remained in operation until the enforcement of Prohibition. At that point, Farragher became involved in real estate in the Youngstown and Detroit markets.

On the morning of October 21, 1934, Michael Joseph Farragher died at his daughter's south side home. An obituary notes he had suffered a debilitating stroke about 10 months earlier. Farragher was survived by his daughter, Mrs. Lawrence J. Moran, a son, Joseph Farragher of South America, and the following siblings: John and James Farragher, Mrs. John King, Miss Catherine Farragher, Mrs. John Barnes, and Mrs. Joseph Tobin. His wife, Rose, had died in 1924. His funeral service was held at St. Dominic's Church, and he was buried at Calvary Cemetery, in Youngstown, Ohio. The passing of one of Youngstown's celebrated "old-time boxers" was duly noted in both of the city's daily newspapers.

== See also ==
- List of bare-knuckle boxers
