= List of Ohio State Buckeyes head football coaches =

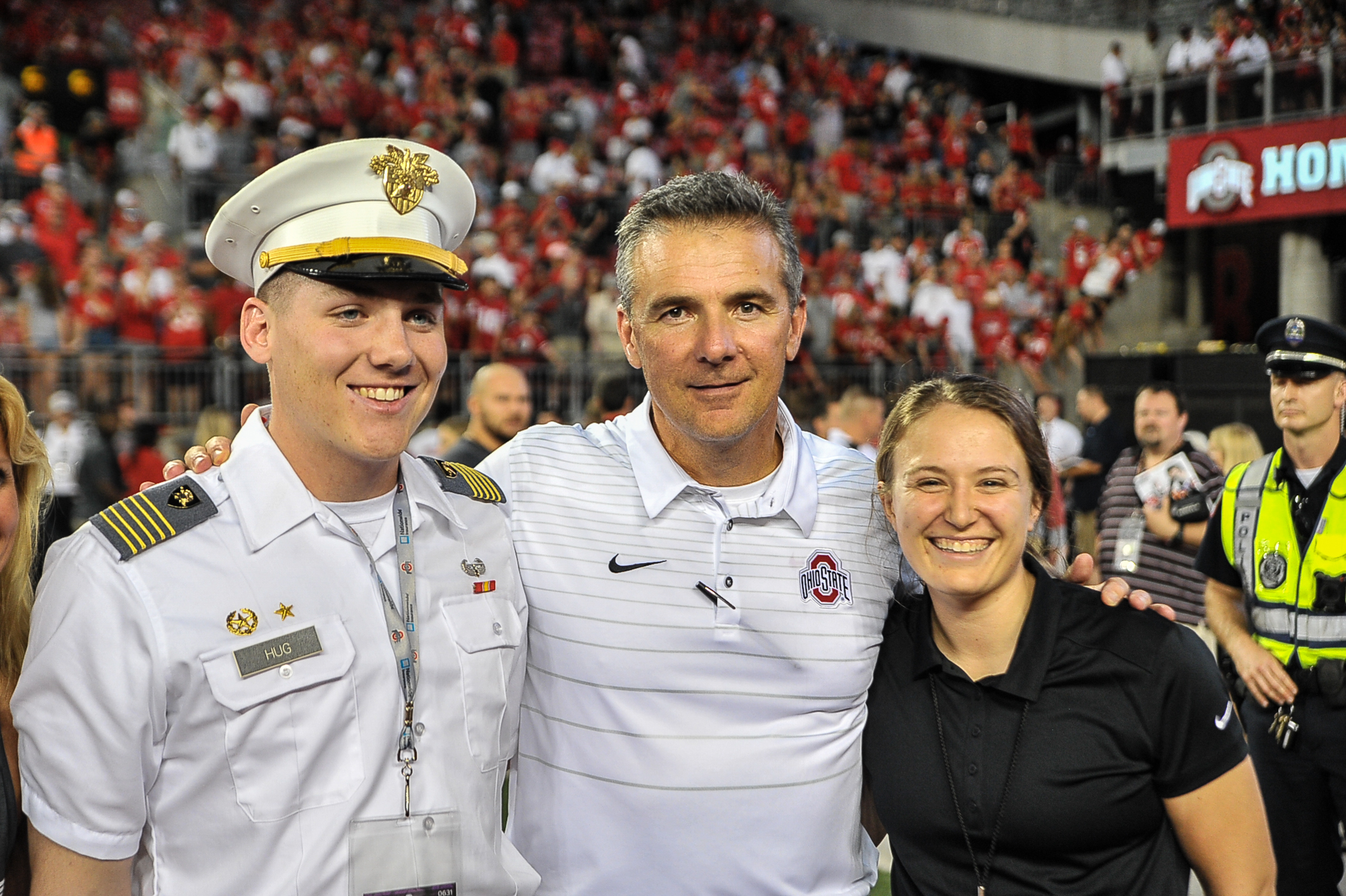
Urban Meyer, head coach of the Ohio State Buckeyes from 2012 to 2018

The Ohio State Buckeyes college football team represents the Ohio State University in the East Division of the Big Ten Conference. The Buckeyes compete as part of the NCAA Division I Football Bowl Subdivision. The program has had 25 coaches since it began play during the 1890 season. The Buckeyes have played over 1,200 games over 125 seasons. In those seasons, nine head coaches have led the Buckeyes to postseason bowl games: John Wilce, Wes Fesler, Woody Hayes, Earle Bruce, John Cooper, Jim Tressel, Luke Fickell, Urban Meyer, and Ryan Day. 13 coaches have won conference championships with the Buckeyes: Albert Herrnstein, John Richards, Wilce, Francis Schmidt, Paul Brown, Carroll Widdoes, Fesler, Hayes, Bruce, Cooper, Tressel, Meyer, and Day. Five coaches led the Buckeyes to national championships: Brown, Hayes, Tressel, Meyer, and Day. Hayes is the all-time leader in games coached and years coached with the Buckeyes, while also leading all coaches in victories (205). Meyer currently holds the highest winning percentage of all Buckeye coaches (.902), with a record of 83–9 through seven seasons. David Edwards holds the lowest winning percentage of any Buckeye head coach (.167), going 1–7–1 in the only season that he coached. Of the 24 Buckeye head coaches, Howard Jones, Wilce, Schmidt, Fesler, Hayes, Bruce, Cooper, Tressel, and Meyer have been inducted into the College Football Hall of Fame. The previous head coach of the Buckeyes was Urban Meyer who was hired in November 2011 and then announced December 4, 2018, he would retire following the Rose Bowl. Ryan Day then became the new coach of the Buckeyes.

== Key ==
General
#	Number of coaches (Note: A running total of the number of coaches of the Buckeyes. Thus, any coach who has two or more separate terms as head coach is counted only once. Acting head coaches are not included in the count.)
DCs	Divisional championships (Note: The Big Ten began divisional play in 2011. From 2011 to 2013 they were in the Leaders division, from 2014 on they have been in the East.)
CCs	Conference championships (Note: Ohio State did not join a conference until 1902.)
NCs	National championships
†	Elected to the College Football Hall of Fame

Overall
GC	Games coached
OW	Wins
OL	Losses
OT	Ties (Note: Overtime rules in college football were introduced in 1996, making ties impossible in the period since.)
O%	Winning percentage (Note: When computing the win–loss percentage, a tie counts as half a win and half a loss.)

Conference
CW	Wins
CL	Losses
CT	Ties
C%	Winning percentage

Postseason (Note: The Big Ten Conference began a conference championship game during the 2011 season and the results are included in the calculation of postseason wins and losses.)
PW	Wins
PL	Losses
PT	Ties

== Coaches ==
#	Name	Term	GC	OW	OL	OT	O%	CW	CL	CT	C%	PW	PL	CCs	DCs	NCs	National awards
1	Alexander Lilley	1890–1891	8	3	5	0	.375	—	—	—	—	—	—	—	—	—	—
2	Jack Ryder	1892–1895, 1898	46	22	22	1	.500	—	—	—	—	—	—	—	—	—	—
3	Charles Hickey (Note: Charles Hickey was hired part-way through the 1896 season and student coached the team in several games.)	1896	11	5	5	1	.500	—	—	—	—	—	—	—	—	—	—
4	David Edwards	1897	9	1	7	1	.167	—	—	—	—	—	—	—	—	—	—
5	John Eckstorm	1899–1901	29	22	4	3	.810	—	—	—	—	—	—	—	—	—	—
6	Perry Hale	1902–1903	21	14	5	2	.714	5	2	0	.714	—	—	—	—	—	—
7	Edwin Sweetland	1904–1905	23	14	7	2	.652	4	1	1	.750	—	—	—	—	—	—
8	Albert Herrnstein	1906–1909	39	28	10	1	.731	17	6	1	.729	—	—	1	—	—	—
9	Howard Jones†	1910	10	6	1	3	.750	5	1	2	.750	—	—	—	—	—	—
10	Harry Vaughan	1911	10	5	3	2	.600	4	1	2	.714	—	—	—	—	—	—
11	John Richards	1912	9	6	3	0	.667	5	0	0	1.000	—	—	1	—	—	—
12	John Wilce†	1913–1928	120	78	33	9	.688	37	30	4	.549	0	1	3	—	—	—
13	Sam Willaman	1929–1933	41	26	10	5	.695	14	8	4	.615	—	—	—	—	—	—
14	Francis Schmidt†	1934–1940	56	39	16	1	.705	30	9	1	.763	—	—	2	—	—	—
15	Paul Brown	1941–1943	27	18	8	1	.685	9	6	1	.594	—	—	1	—	1 – 1942	—
16	Carroll Widdoes	1944–1945	18	16	2	0	.889	11	2	0	.846	—	—	1	—	—	AFCA Coach of the Year (1944)
17	Paul Bixler	1946	9	4	3	2	.556	2	3	1	.417	—	—	—	—	—	—
18	Wes Fesler†	1947–1950	37	21	13	3	.608	13	10	2	.560	1	0	1	—	—	—
19	Woody Hayes†	1951–1978	276	205	61	10	.761	152	37	7	.793	5	6	13	—	5 – 1954, 1957, 1961, 1968, 1970	AFCA Coach of the Year (1957); Eddie Robinson Coach of the Year (1957, 1968, 1975); Walter Camp Coach of the Year (1968)
20	Earle Bruce†	1979–1987	108	81	26	1	.755	57	17	0	.770	5	3	4	—	—	AFCA Coach of the Year (1979); Eddie Robinson Coach of the Year (1979); Woody Hayes Trophy (1979)
21	John Cooper†	1988–2000	158	111	43	4	.715	70	30	4	.692	3	8	3	—	—	—
22	Jim Tressel (Note: Ohio State finished the 2010 season with an overall record of 12–1 and a conference record of 7–1. Ohio State voluntarily vacated all victories during the season, as well as the conference championship and Sugar Bowl victory, as a result of NCAA infractions.)	2001–2010	128	94	22	—	.810	59	14	—	.808	5	4	6	—	1 – 2002	AFCA Coach of the Year (2002); Eddie Robinson Coach of the Year (2002); Paul "Bear" Bryant Award (2002); Woody Hayes Trophy (2002)
Int	Luke Fickell (Note: Luke Fickell was named interim head coach in May 2011, following the resignation of Jim Tressel.)	2011	13	6	7	—	.462	3	5	—	.375	0	1	—	—	—	—
23	Urban Meyer †	2012–2018	92	83	9	—	.902	54	4	—	.931	5	2	3	7	1 – 2014	Woody Hayes Trophy (2012)
24	Ryan Day (Note: Ryan Day was named acting head coach during the three-game suspension of Urban Meyer at the beginning of the 2018 season. His statistics include these three games.)	2019–present	102	88	14	—	.863	59	6	—	.908	4	4	2	3	1 — 2024	—

== See also ==
List of Sports Coaches From Youngstown, Ohio
