= List of sports coaches from Youngstown, Ohio =

Many notable sports coaches were born in, residents of, or otherwise closely associated with Youngstown, Ohio. The northeastern Ohio region has earned a reputation as a so-called "cradle of coaches," producing a number of successful college football leaders. Much of this tradition traces back to Cardinal Mooney High School under longtime head coach Don Bucci and defensive coordinator Ron Stoops Sr., whose program produced multiple Ohio state championships and instilled a rigorous football culture in generations of players. From the Stoops family alone emerged three Division I head coaches—Bob, Mike, and Mark Stoops—while fellow Cardinal Mooney alumnus Bo Pelini also rose to national prominence. The influence extended beyond Mooney to Youngstown State University, where Jim Tressel, Mark Mangino, and Mark Dantonio all served as assistants before becoming head coaches at major programs.

By the early 2000s, Youngstown connections were a fixture in college football’s biggest games. Between 2000 and 2007, at least one coach with ties to the city appeared in seven of eight Bowl Championship Series national title games, including Tressel at Ohio State, Bob Stoops at Oklahoma, Mark Stoops at Miami, and Pelini at LSU. The city’s football lineage has been attributed to its steel-town work ethic, close-knit community, and the leadership of figures like Bucci and Stoops Sr., whose impact shaped both the Stoops and Pelini families. Today, Youngstown remains closely identified with its outsized contribution to the sport, with alumni active across the NCAA and professional football.

Another example is Mark Stoops, the head football coach at the University of Kentucky, who hails from Youngstown. A member of the well-known Stoops family of football coaches, alongside his brothers Bob and Mike, Stoops grew up in the city before beginning his playing and coaching career. Youngstown has also produced several other notable figures in sports and beyond, underscoring the city’s reputation for shaping prominent athletic and coaching talent.

Every year, many of the Youngstown coaches' friends and family gather for a bocce tournament.

== Coaches ==
Name	Occupation	Notes	All-time coaching record
Russell "Busty" Ashbaugh	Football coach	Squad captain at Brown University; coach at Youngstown's South High School; mentor to collegiate and professional players including Bob Dove; trainer of coaches including Youngstown State University's Dwight "Dike" Beede and Ohio State University's Wes Fesler	
Tim Beck	Head coach at Coastal Carolina University	Born in Youngstown and graduated from Cardinal Mooney High School	14–12
Dwight "Dike" Beede	Football coach	Celebrated head coach at Youngstown State University, 1938–1972; inventor of the penalty flag	
Tommy Bell	Boxer and coach	Fought for welterweight title against Sugar Ray Robinson in 1946; born in Youngstown	
Dan Bertolini	American baseball coach		141–266 (.346)
Bob Commings	Football coach	Led Iowa Hawkeyes to a 12-10 upset victory over UCLA in 1974; born in Youngstown	
Mark Dantonio	Most recent head coaching position was at Michigan State University, 2007–2019	In 1986, he began a five-year stint on Jim Tressel's staff at Youngstown State University as a defensive secondary coach. In 1990, Dantonio led the Penguins' defense to an 11–0 record and a No. 2 ranking nationally.	132–74
Bob Davie	Football coach	Former head coach and defensive coordinator of the University of Notre Dame football team; current football analyst for ESPN and ABC; graduate of Youngstown State University	
Bob Dove	Football player and coach	College Football Hall of Fame, All-America end at the University of Notre Dame; eight seasons in the NFL for the Chicago Cardinals and Detroit Lions, 1948–1954; assistant coach at Youngstown State University; born in Youngstown	
James Farragher	Football coach	Coach at University of Notre Dame; compiled record of 14 wins, four losses, and two ties between 1901 and 1902; born in Youngstown	
Wes Fesler	Football coach	Three-sport athlete at the Ohio State University, including three consecutive years as a consensus first-team All-America selection in American football; football head coach at Wesleyan University, University of Pittsburgh, Ohio State University, and University of Minnesota; head basketball coach at Harvard University and Princeton University; born in Youngstown	
Sloko Gill	Football player and coach	First person from Youngstown to play in the NFL; center for the Detroit Lions in 1942; coached at Youngstown State University and Campbell Memorial High School	
Joe Malmisur	American football coach and college athletics administrator	Head football coach at Heidelberg College and Hiram College; ended his career as the athletic director at Youngstown State University 1983–1994; from Youngstown	
Mark Mangino	Head football coach at the University of Kansas 2002–2009	Graduated from YSU	50–48
Deacon McGuire	Baseball player and coach	Played for Detroit Tigers, Washington Senators, Cleveland Blues, 1884–1912; participated in more Major League Baseball seasons than any catcher in the history of the game; later manager and coach; born and raised in Youngstown	
Bill Narduzzi	Football coach	Born in Youngstown	68–51–1
Pat Narduzzi	American football coach and former player	Began his playing career at Ursuline High School in Youngstown	72–56
Bo Pelini	Former American football coach and former player	Born in Youngstown	100–55
Carl Pelini	American football coach	Born in Youngstown	7–18
Jerry Slocum	College basketball coach	Born in Youngstown	723–556 (.565)
Mark Snyder	American football coach	During his tenure at Youngstown State, the Penguins won three NCAA Division I-AA national championships and played in four consecutive national championship games.	22–37
Bob Stoops	Head coach for the Arlington Renegades of the United Football League (UFL)	Born in Youngstown	191–48
Mark Stoops	Head football coach for the University of Kentucky	Born in Youngstown	67–73
Mike Stoops	Inside linebackers coach for the University of Kentucky	Born in Youngstown	41–50
Dick Tressel	Football coach		124–102–2
Jim Tressel	American college football coach, politician, and university administrator; lieutenant governor-designate of Ohio	Coached Youngstown State University 1986–2000; currently resides in Youngstown	229–79–2
Lee Tressel	Football coach		155–52–6
Eric Wolford	Football coach	Born in Youngstown	31–26
