= List of professional sports teams in Ohio =

Ohio is the seventh-most populated state in the United States and has a rich history of professional sports.

== Active teams ==
=== Major league teams ===
Ohio is home to eight major professional sports teams. Three of the teams are located in Cleveland, three are in Cincinnati and two are in Columbus.

American football
League	Team	City	Stadium	Capacity
NFL	Cleveland Browns	Cleveland	Huntington Bank Field	67,431
NFL	Cincinnati Bengals	Cincinnati	Paycor Stadium	65,515
Baseball
League	Team	City	Stadium	Capacity
MLB	Cleveland Guardians	Cleveland	Progressive Field	34,820
MLB	Cincinnati Reds	Cincinnati	Great American Ballpark	43,500
Basketball
League	Team	City	Arena	Capacity
NBA	Cleveland Cavaliers	Cleveland	Rocket Arena	19,432
Ice hockey
League	Team	City	Arena	Capacity
NHL	Columbus Blue Jackets	Columbus	Nationwide Arena	18,500
Soccer
League	Team	City	Stadium	Capacity
MLS	Columbus Crew	Columbus	Lower.com Field	20,371
MLS	FC Cincinnati	Cincinnati	TQL Stadium	26,000

=== Other professional sports teams ===
==== Men's leagues ====
American football
League	Team	City	Stadium	Capacity
UFL	Columbus Aviators	Columbus	Historic Crew Stadium	19,968
Arena football
League	Team	City	Stadium	Capacity
AAL	Ohio Legends	Marion	Veterans Memorial Coliseum	3,200
Baseball
League	Team	City	Stadium	Capacity
IL (AAA)	Columbus Clippers	Columbus	Huntington Park	10,100
IL (AAA)	Toledo Mud Hens	Toledo	Fifth Third Field	10,300
EL (AA)	Akron RubberDucks	Akron	7 17 Credit Union Park	7,630
MWL (High-A)	Dayton Dragons	Dayton	Day Air Ballpark	7,230
MWL (High-A)	Lake County Captains	Eastlake	Classic Auto Group Park	6,500
FL (Ind.)	Lake Erie Crushers	Avon	Crushers Stadium	5,000
Basketball
League	Team	City	Arena	Capacity
G League	Cleveland Charge	Cleveland	Public Auditorium	10,000
TBL	Columbus Wizards	Westerville	Rike Center	3,100
TBL	Glass City Wranglers	Toledo	Glass City Center	2,000
TBL	Grove City Whitetails	Grove City	Central Crossing High School	1,700
Ice hockey
League	Team	City	Arena	Capacity
AHL	Cleveland Monsters	Cleveland	Rocket Arena	18,926
ECHL	Cincinnati Cyclones	Cincinnati	Heritage Bank Center	14,453
ECHL	Toledo Walleye	Toledo	Huntington Center	7,389
Soccer
League	Team	City	Stadium	Capacity
MLSNP	Columbus Crew 2	Columbus	Historic Crew Stadium	19,968

==== Women's leagues ====
Basketball
League	Team	City	Arena	Capacity
WNBA	Cleveland Sirens	Cleveland	Rocket Arena	19,432
Volleyball
League	Team	City	Stadium	Capacity
MLV	Columbus Fury	Columbus	Nationwide Arena	18,500

=== Map of cities with a professional sports team ===
Location with a major professional sports team
Location with a professional sports team

== See also ==
- Sports in Ohio
