= Andy Cvercko =

American football player (1937–2010)

No. 62, 63, 67
- Position: Guard

Personal information
- Born: November 6, 1937; Campbell, Ohio, U.S.
- Died: December 13, 2010 (aged 73); Rolling Meadows, Illinois, U.S.
- Listed height: 6 ft 1 in (1.85 m)
- Listed weight: 243 lb (110 kg)

Career information
- High school: Campbell Memorial
- College: Northwestern (1955–1958)
- NFL draft: 1959: 5th round, 55th overall pick

Career history
- Green Bay Packers (1959–1960); Dallas Cowboys (1961–1962); Cleveland Browns (1963); Washington Redskins (1963)

Awards and highlights
- First-team All-American (1958); First-team All-Big Ten (1958)

Career NFL statistics
- Games played: 47
- Games started: 22
- Fumble recoveries: 1
- Stats at Pro Football Reference

Andrew Bertram Cvercko (November 6, 1937 – December 3, 2010) was an American professional football guard in the National Football League (NFL) for the Green Bay Packers, Dallas Cowboys and Washington Redskins. He played college football at Northwestern University.

== Early life ==
Cvercko attended Campbell Memorial High School. He accepted a football scholarship from Northwestern University, where he was coached by Ara Parseghian. He became a two-way left tackle and a three-year starter.

As a senior, he was awarded the Big Ten Conference Medal of Honor, which is given annually to a male and female athlete at each of the Big Ten institutions, who demonstrates the greatest proficiency in scholarship and athletics.

In 2000, he was inducted into the Northwestern Athletic Hall of Fame.

== Professional career ==
=== Green Bay Packers ===
Cvercko was selected by the Green Bay Packers in the fifth round (55th overall) of the 1959 NFL draft, with the intention of playing him at offensive guard. As a rookie, he suffered a knee injury in the season opener against the Chicago Bears and was lost for the year. In 1960, he was a reserve player.

On September 4, 1961, he was traded to the Dallas Cowboys in exchange for a draft choice.

=== Dallas Cowboys ===
In 1961, he started 10 games at left guard, splitting time with John Houser (4 starts).

In 1962, he started all 14 games at left guard. In the second game against the Pittsburgh Steelers, he was called for a holding penalty that negated a 99-yard touchdown reception (at the time a league record) from Frank Clarke and because it was in the end zone, it was called a safety, which created a nine-point swing in the game and contributed to a 28–30 loss.

On July 10, 1963, he was traded to the Cleveland Browns in exchange for a sixth round draft choice (#82-Jim Curry).

=== Cleveland Browns ===
In 1963, he appeared in 2 games as a reserve player. On September 17, he was waived to make room for guard Ted Connolly.

=== Washington Redskins ===
On September 25, 1963, he was signed as a free agent by the Washington Redskins, to replace injured guard Wiley Feagin. He appeared in 8 games as a reserve player.

== Personal life ==
After football, he researched nuclear magnetic resonance at Argonne National Laboratories and worked as an electronic engineer at Motorola. On December 3, 2010, he died at his home in Rolling Meadows, Illinois. His brother Jack Cvercko was a football All-American in 1962 and was selected in the 1963 NFL draft and 1963 AFL Draft, by the Green Bay Packers and San Diego Chargers, but a chronic knee injury prevented him from becoming a professional football player.
