= Ralph Goldston =

American gridiron football player (1929–2011)

No. 22, 88, 80, 21, 76, 27
- Positions: Halfback, defensive back

Personal information
- Born: February 25, 1929; Campbell, Ohio, U.S.
- Died: July 9, 2011 (aged 82); Columbus, Ohio, U.S.
- Listed height: 5 ft 11 in (1.80 m)
- Listed weight: 195 lb (88 kg)

Career information
- High school: Campbell Memorial
- College: Indiana (1947–1948); Youngstown State (1950–1951)
- NFL draft: 1952: 11th round, 125th overall pick

Career history

Playing
- Philadelphia Eagles (1952, 1954–1955); Hamilton Tiger-Cats (1956-1964); Montreal Alouettes (1965)

Coaching
- Montreal Alouettes (1966–1969) Assistant coach; Chicago Bears (1974) Offensive backs / special teams coach

Awards and highlights
- 2× Grey Cup champion (1957, 1963); 4× CFL East All-Star (1956-1959)

Career NFL statistics
- Rushing yards: 203
- Rushing average: 2.6
- Receptions: 4
- Receiving yards: 20
- Total touchdowns: 3
- Stats at Pro Football Reference

Ralph Peter Goldston (February 25, 1929 – July 9, 2011) was a running back and defensive back in the Canadian Football League (CFL) who played nine seasons for the Hamilton Tiger-Cats. He helped the Tiger-Cats to two Grey Cup wins in 1957 and 1963. He was a 4 time all-star with the Ti-Cats, intercepting 32 passes and returning them for 416 yards. Goldston finished his career with the Montreal Alouettes in 1965. He was selected in the 1952 NFL draft by the Philadelphia Eagles and he played four seasons for the Eagles. After retiring as an active player, Goldston spent 30 years as a college coach (Harvard and Colorado) and finally a scout for the Seattle Seahawks.

Goldston died on July 9, 2011, in Columbus, Ohio.
