= Jack Cvercko =

American football player (born 1941)

Profile
- Position: Guard

Personal information
- Born: January 24, 1941 (age 85); Youngstown, Ohio, U.S.
- Listed height: 6 ft 0 in (1.83 m)
- Listed weight: 215 lb (98 kg)

Career information
- High school: Campbell Memorial (OH)
- College: Northwestern (1960–1963)
- NFL draft: 1963: 5th round, 63rd overall pick
- AFL draft: 1963: 14th round, 109th overall pick

Career history
- 1963: San Diego Chargers

Awards and highlights
- Consensus All-American (1962); First-team All-Big Ten (1962)

Jack Cvercko (born January 24, 1941) is an American former college football player. He played guard for the Northwestern Wildcats. Cvercko was drafted in the 1963 NFL and AFL draft, but a chronic knee injury prevented him from becoming a professional football player.

== Personal life ==
Jack Cvercko was born January 24, 1941, in Youngstown Ohio. Cvercko is the brother of Andy Cvercko. Cverkco attended Campbell Memorial High School.

Cvercko after football, worked for 24 years as a professor of mathematics at Daytona Beach Community College.

== College career ==
Following graduation in 1959, Cvercko enrolled at Northwestern University, where he played football for 3 seasons from 1960-1963.

Cvercko sat out the 1961 season due to a knee injury.

As a junior in 1962, he was a consensus pick on the 1962 All-America college football team, receiving first-team honors from Sporting News, the United Press International, and Time magazine

Cvercko was voted an All-American in 1963. He was labeled by Sports Illustrated as "one of the top linemen in the nation."

Jack Cvercko was later inducted into the Northwestern Athletics Hall of Fame and Otto Graham Wildcats Honor Roll along with his brother Andy in 2005.

== Professional career ==
Cvercko was drafted in the 14th round with the 109th overall pick by the San Diego Chargers (now Los Angeles Chargers) in 1963 AFL Draft. Cverkco never took the field due to knee injuries from his time at Northwestern. He was also drafted 63rd overall by the Green Bay Packers in the 1963 NFL Draft, but ultimately chose the Chargers over the Packers.
