= Ohltown, Ohio =

Unincorporated community in Ohio, U.S.

Coordinates: 41°07′42″N 80°47′06″W

Ohltown is an unincorporated community in Mahoning County, in the U.S. state of Ohio. It is a suburb located between Youngstown, Austintown, and the Meander Creek Reservoir.

== History ==
A post office was established at Ohltown in 1841, and remained in operation until 1902. The community was named for Michael Ohl, who started a mill there in the 1810s. In addition to operating a saw and grist mill, Michael Ohl operated a hotel and was the first postmaster.

Today, Ohltown is listed as a "ghost town." This is because most of the old town site was flooded in the 1920s to create the Meander Creek Reservoir. All that remains of the community is the Ohltown United Methodist Church and a few homes.

== Notable person ==
James Anson Campbell, a businessman in the steel industry, was born near Ohltown in 1854.
