= Sports in Ohio =

Ohio is home to many professional and college sports teams. The metropolitan areas of Cleveland, Cincinnati, and Columbus are home to major league professional sports teams in baseball, basketball, American football, ice hockey, and soccer.

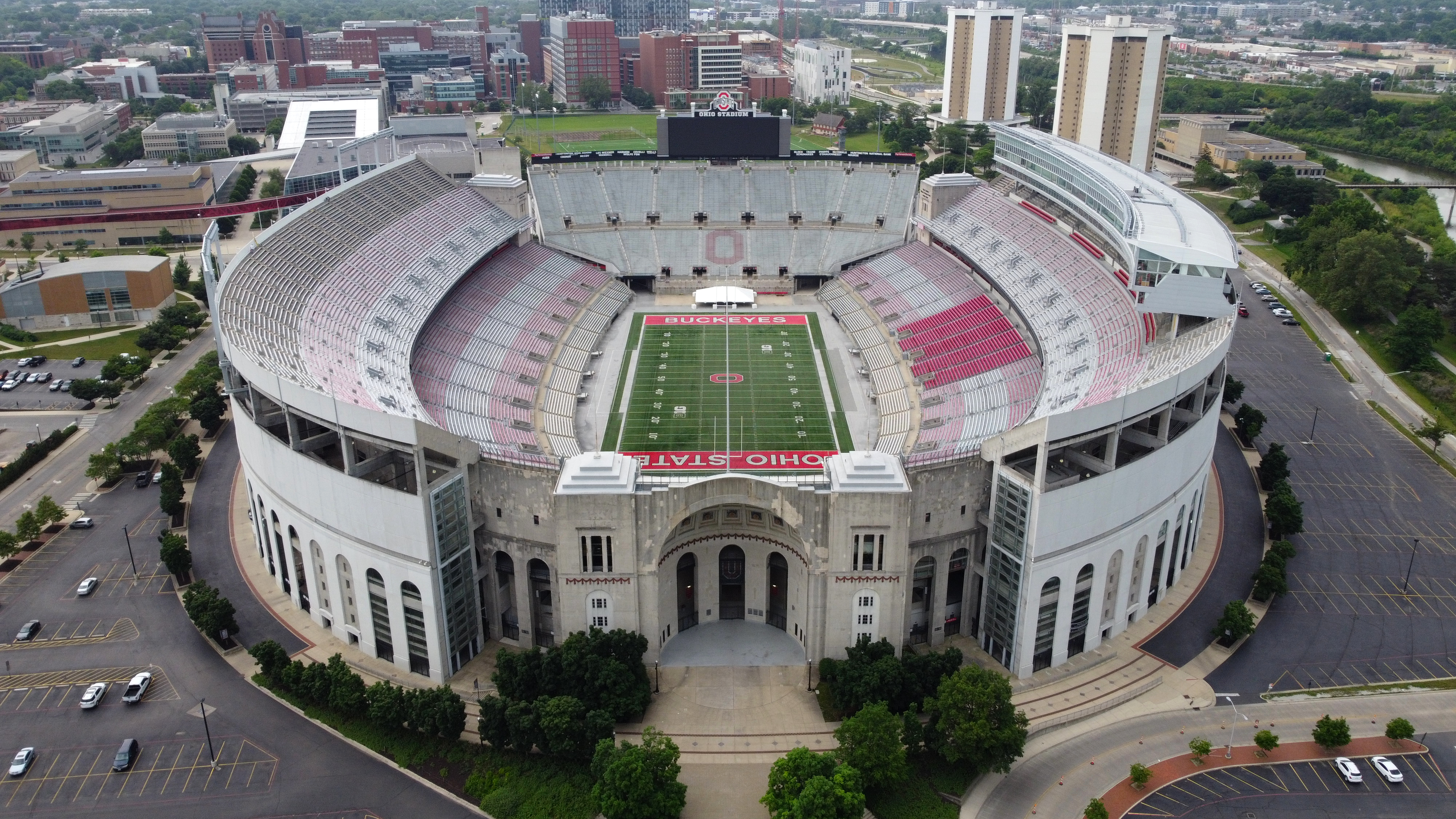
Ohio Stadium, home to the Ohio State Buckeyes football team

== Major league sports teams ==
Ohio is home to major professional sports teams in baseball, basketball, football, hockey, volleyball, and soccer. The state's major professional sporting teams include: Cincinnati Reds (Major League Baseball), Cleveland Guardians (Major League Baseball), Cincinnati Bengals (National Football League), Cleveland Browns (National Football League), Cleveland Cavaliers (National Basketball Association), Columbus Blue Jackets (National Hockey League), Columbus Crew (Major League Soccer), Columbus Fury (Pro Volleyball Federation) and FC Cincinnati (Major League Soccer).

Ohio played a central role in the development of both Major League Baseball and the National Football League. Baseball's first fully professional team, the Cincinnati Red Stockings of 1869, were organized in Ohio. An informal early 20th century American football association, the Ohio League, was the direct predecessor of the NFL, although neither of Ohio's modern NFL franchises trace their roots to an Ohio League club. The Pro Football Hall of Fame is located in Canton.

Ohio teams have won seven World Series (five for Cincinnati Reds, two for Cleveland Guardians), nine NFL Championships (four for Cleveland Browns, two for Canton Bulldogs, one for Cleveland Rams, one for Akron Pros, one for Cleveland Bulldogs), one NBA Finals (Cleveland Cavaliers), four AAFC Championships (Cleveland Browns), and three MLS Cups (Columbus Crew).

Team	Sport	League	City	Venue (capacity)	League titles
Cincinnati Bengals	American football	National Football League	Cincinnati	Paycor Stadium	0
Cleveland Browns	American football	National Football League	Cleveland	Huntington Bank Field	4
Cleveland Guardians	Baseball	Major League Baseball	Cleveland	Progressive Field	2
Cincinnati Reds	Baseball	Major League Baseball	Cincinnati	Great American Ball Park	5
Cleveland Cavaliers	Basketball	National Basketball Association	Cleveland	Rocket Arena	1
Columbus Blue Jackets	Ice hockey	National Hockey League	Columbus	Nationwide Arena	0
Columbus Crew	Soccer	Major League Soccer	Columbus	ScottsMiracle-Gro Field	3
FC Cincinnati	Soccer	Major League Soccer	Cincinnati	TQL Stadium	0

== Minor league teams ==
On a smaller scale, Ohio hosts minor league baseball, arena football, indoor football, mid-level hockey, and lower division soccer.

The minor league baseball teams include the International League's Columbus Clippers (affiliated with the Cleveland Guardians) and Toledo Mud Hens (affiliated with the Detroit Tigers), the Eastern League's Akron RubberDucks (affiliated with the Guardians) and the Midwest League's Dayton Dragons (affiliated with the Cincinnati Reds) and Lake County Captains (affiliated with the Guardians). The Mahoning Valley Scrappers were also affiliated with the former Indians, playing the New York–Penn League before the 2021 Minor League Baseball reorganization and became a founding member of the MLB Draft League. Additionally, the Lake Erie Crushers play in the independent Frontier League.

Ohio's minor professional football teams include: Canton Legends 2005-2008 (American Indoor Football Association), Cincinnati Marshals 2005-2007 (National Indoor Football League), Cincinnati Sizzle (Women's Football Alliance), Cleveland Fusion (Women's Football Alliance), Cleveland Gladiators (Arena Football League), Columbus Comets (Women's Football Alliance), Mahoning Valley Thunder 2006-2009 (af2), Marion Mayhem 2006-2010 (Continental Indoor Football League), and Miami Valley Silverbacks 2006-2012 (Continental Indoor Football League).

Ohio's minor league hockey teams include: Cleveland Monsters (American Hockey League), Cincinnati Cyclones (ECHL), and the Toledo Walleye (ECHL).

Ohio’s minor league basketball teams include: Cleveland Charge (NBA G League) and Burning River Buckets (American Basketball Association)

Ohio has been home to teams in many lower-division soccer leagues. The second-level USL Championship (USLC) currently has no teams in the state, but has had Ohio teams in the past. The Dayton Dutch Lions played in the league, then known as USL Pro, from 2011 to 2014, after which it moved to the league then known as the Premier Development League and now as USL League Two (USL2), where it remains today. From 2016 to 2018, FC Cincinnati played in the USLC, then known as the United Soccer League, before being replaced by the current MLS team of the same name. The aforementioned Dayton Dutch Lions are the only current USL2 team that plays in Ohio. A second current USL2 team, the Cincinnati Dutch Lions, played home games in Cincinnati from 2014 to 2016, but now plays at Northern Kentucky University. Other past Ohio teams in USL2 are the Cincinnati Riverhawks (1997), Cincinnati Kings (2008–2012), Cleveland Internationals (2004–2010), Dayton Gemini (2000–2002), and Toledo Slayers (2003–2005). Ohio also has Cleveland SC, FC Columbus, and Toledo Villa FC of the National Premier Soccer League, and Columbus Eagles FC, Cleveland Ambassadors, and Cincinnati Sirens FC of the Women's Premier Soccer League. Two teams play for MLS Next Pro, FC Cincinnati 2 and Columbus Crew 2.

Ohio is also home to the Cleveland Comets, a minor professional softball club, of National Pro Fastpitch.

=== Baseball ===
Team	Level	League	Affiliate	City	Venue
Columbus Clippers	Triple-A	International League	Cleveland Guardians	Columbus	Huntington Park
Toledo Mud Hens	Triple-A	International League	Detroit Tigers	Toledo	Fifth Third Field
Akron RubberDucks	Double-A	Eastern League	Cleveland Guardians	Akron	7 17 Credit Union Park
Dayton Dragons	High-A	Midwest League	Cincinnati Reds	Dayton	Day Air Ballpark
Lake County Captains	High-A	Midwest League	Cleveland Guardians	Eastlake	Classic Auto Group Park
Lake Erie Crushers	Independent	Frontier League	None	Avon	Mercy Health Stadium

=== Basketball ===
Team	Level	League	Affiliate	City	Venue
Cleveland Charge	NBA	NBA G League	Cleveland Cavaliers	Cleveland	Public Auditorium
Cincinnati Warriors	Independent	The Basketball League	None	Cincinnati	Courts 4 Sports
Dayton Flight	Independent	The Basketball League	None	Dayton	Dayton Sports Complex
Glass City Wranglers	Independent	The Basketball League	None	Toledo	Owens Community College

=== Football ===
Team	Level	League	City	Venue
Columbus Wild Dogs	Indoor	Indoor Football League	Columbus	Nationwide Arena
Columbus Chaos	Women's II	Women's Football Alliance	Columbus	
Cincinnati Sizzle	Women's developmental	Women's Football Alliance	Cincinnati	

=== Ice hockey ===
Team	Level	League	Affiliate	City	Venue
Cleveland Monsters	High-level	American Hockey League	Columbus Blue Jackets	Cleveland	Rocket Arena
Cincinnati Cyclones	Mid-level	ECHL	Buffalo Sabres	Cincinnati	Heritage Bank Center
Toledo Walleye	Mid-level	ECHL	Detroit Red Wings	Toledo	Huntington Center
Youngstown Phantoms	Junior	United States Hockey League	None	Youngstown	Covelli Centre

=== Soccer ===
Team	Level	League	City	Venue
Columbus Crew 2	Division III	MLS Next Pro	Columbus	Historic Crew Stadium
FC Cincinnati 2	Division III	MLS Next Pro	Cincinnati	NKU Soccer Stadium (KY)

== Individual sports ==
Notable drivers from Ohio include Mauri Rose, Frank Lockhart, Ted Horn, Bobby Rahal, Sam Hornish Jr. and Tim Richmond. The Mid-Ohio Sports Car Course has hosted several auto racing championships, including CART World Series, IndyCar Series, NASCAR Xfinity Series, Can-Am, Formula 5000, IMSA GT Championship, American Le Mans Series and Rolex Sports Car Series.

The Grand Prix of Cleveland also hosted CART races from 1982 to 2007. The Eldora Speedway is a major dirt oval that hosts NASCAR Truck Series, World of Outlaws Sprint Cars and USAC Silver Crown Series races.

Ohio has several short ovals, including Eldora Speedway and Toledo Speedway. Notable dragstrips in Ohio include the National Trail Raceway and the Summit Motorsports Park.

Ohio hosts two PGA Tour events, the WGC-Bridgestone Invitational and Memorial Tournament. Columbus native Jack Nicklaus won 18 major golf tournaments, whereas Urbana native Pete Dye is a prominent golf course architect.

The Cincinnati Open is an ATP World Tour Masters 1000 and WTA Premier 5 tennis tournament.

=== Major annual events ===
Sport	Event	League	Facility	Location	Year established
Auto racing	Indy 200 at Mid-Ohio	IndyCar	Mid-Ohio Sports Car Course	Lexington	1970
Auto racing	Sports Car Challenge at Mid-Ohio	IMSA SportsCar Championship	Mid-Ohio Sports Car Course	Lexington	1963
Auto racing	O'Reilly Auto Parts 150 at Mid-Ohio	NASCAR Camping World Truck Series	Mid-Ohio Sports Car Course	Lexington	2022
Auto racing	Dawn 150	ARCA Menards Series	Mid-Ohio Sports Car Course	Lexington	2022
Auto racing	Summit Racing Equipment NHRA Nationals	NHRA Camping World Drag Racing Series	Summit Motorsports Park	Norwalk	2007
Auto racing	Herr's Potato Chips 200	ARCA Menards Series	Toledo Speedway	Toledo	1953
Golf	Memorial Tournament	PGA Tour	Muirfield Village	Dublin	1976
Golf	Dana Open	LPGA Tour	Highland Meadows Golf Club	Sylvania	1984
Golf	Kroger Queen City Championship	LPGA Tour	TPC River's Bend	Cincinnati	2022
Horse racing	Little Brown Jug	Harness Racing for Pacers	Delaware County Fairgrounds	Delaware	1946
Tennis	Cincinnati Open	ATP/WTA	Lindner Family Tennis Center	Mason	1899

== Former professional teams ==
Former major league teams:

- Akron Pros (NFL) (1920–1925)
- Canton Bulldogs (NFL) (1920–1923; 1925–1926)
- Portsmouth Spartans (NFL) (1930–1933)
- Cincinnati Red Stockings (NL) (1876–1880)
- Cleveland Blues (NL) (1879–1884)
- Cleveland Spiders (AA-NL) (1887–1899)
- Cleveland Rams (NFL) (1936–1945)
- Cleveland Rebels (BAA) (1946–1947)
- Cincinnati Royals (NBA) (1957–1972)
- Cleveland Barons (NHL) (1976–1978)
- Cleveland Crusaders (WHA)(1972–1976)
- Cincinnati Stingers (WHA) (1975–1979)
- Dayton Triangles (NFL) (1920–1929)
- Cleveland Rockers (WNBA) (1997–2003)
- Columbus Destroyers (AFL) (2004–2008; 2019)
- Cincinnati Marshals (National Indoor Football League) (2005–2007)
- Mahoning Valley Thunder (af2) (2006–2009)
- Miami Valley Silverbacks (Continental Indoor Football League) (2006–2012)
- Toledo Maroons (NFL) (1922-1923)

== Collegiate sports ==
Ohio has eight NCAA Division I FBS college football teams, divided among three different conferences. It has also experienced considerable success in the secondary and tertiary tiers of college football divisions.

In FBS, representing the Big Ten, the Ohio State Buckeyes football team ranks 1st among all-time winningest programs, with nine national championships and seven Heisman Trophy winners. Their biggest rivals are the Michigan Wolverines, whom they traditionally play each year as the last game of their regular season schedule.

Ohio is one of only two states to have two colleges to appear in the College Football Playoffs. Ohio State appeared in 2014, 2016, 2019, 2020, 2022, 2024, and 2025 while Cincinnati appeared in 2021. Ohio State won two national championships in 2014 and 2024 while Cincinnati lost in their only appearance. Since 2023, the Cincinnati Bearcats have represented the state in the Big 12 Conference.

Ohio has six teams represented in the Mid-American Conference: the Akron Zips, Bowling Green Falcons, Kent State Golden Flashes, Miami RedHawks, Ohio Bobcats and Toledo Rockets. The MAC headquarters are in Cleveland.

The Youngstown State Penguins have been a perennial power at the Division I FCS level in the Missouri Valley Football Conference, having won four FCS titles.

In NCAA Division III, the Mount Union Purple Raiders boast a record-setting 13 national championships, most recently in 2017. Since 1996, the Purple Raiders have advanced to the Division III title game in all but three seasons, and appeared in 11 consecutive title games (2005–2015). They also boast two record winning streaks for D-III—55 straight wins overall from 2000 to 2003, and 112 straight regular-season wins from 2005 to 2016 (the latter breaking the school's own record of 110, set from 1994 to 2005).

=== Division I Universities ===
School	Primary conference	Teams fielded	National team titles
Akron Zips	Mid-American Conference	17	2
Bowling Green Falcons	Mid-American Conference	17	4
Cincinnati Bearcats	Big 12 Conference	18	2
Cleveland State Vikings	Horizon League	17	0
Dayton Flyers	Atlantic 10 Conference	16	0
Kent State Golden Flashes	Mid-American Conference	19	0
Miami RedHawks	Mid-American Conference	19	0
Ohio Bobcats	Mid-American Conference	16	0
Ohio State Buckeyes	Big Ten Conference	33	86
Toledo Rockets	Mid-American Conference	18	2
Wright State Raiders	Horizon League	11	0
Xavier Musketeers	Big East Conference	16	0
Youngstown State Penguins	Horizon League	21	4

== Stadiums and arenas ==
Stadium	City	Capacity	Type	Tenants	Opened
Ohio Stadium	Columbus	104,944	Football	Ohio State Buckeyes	1922
FirstEnergy Stadium	Cleveland	73,200	Football	Cleveland Browns	1999
Paycor Stadium	Cincinnati	65,790	Football	Cincinnati Bengals	2000
Great American Ball Park	Cincinnati	42,059	Baseball	Cincinnati Reds	2003
Nippert Stadium	Cincinnati	40,000	Football	Cincinnati Bearcats	1915
Progressive Field	Cleveland	38,000	Baseball	Cleveland Guardians	1994
InfoCision Stadium – Summa Field	Akron	30,000	Football	Akron Zips football	2009
Doyt Perry Stadium	Bowling Green	28,599	Football	Bowling Green Falcons	1966
Glass Bowl	Toledo	26,248	Football	Toledo Rockets	1937
TQL Stadium	Cincinnati	26,000	Soccer	FC Cincinnati	2021
Dix Stadium	Kent	25,319	Football	Kent State Golden Flashes	1969
Fred C. Yager Stadium	Oxford	24,286	Football	Miami RedHawks	1983
Peden Stadium	Athens	24,000	Football	Ohio Bobcats	1929
Stambaugh Stadium	Youngstown	20,630	Football	Youngstown State Penguins	1982
Rocket Arena	Cleveland	20,562	Arena	Cleveland Cavaliers; Cleveland Monsters	1994
ScottsMiracle-Gro Field	Columbus	20,000	Soccer	Columbus Crew	2021
Historic Crew Stadium	Columbus	19,968	Soccer	Columbus Crew 2	
Nationwide Arena	Columbus	19,500	Arena	Columbus Blue Jackets	2000
Value City Arena	Columbus	18,809	Arena	Ohio State Buckeyes	1998
Heritage Bank Center	Cincinnati	17,000	Arena	Cincinnati Cyclones	1975
Wolstein Center	Cleveland	13,610	Arena	Cleveland State Vikings	1991
UD Arena	Dayton	13,455	Arena	Dayton Flyers; NCAA Men's First Four	1969
Fifth Third Arena	Cincinnati	13,176	Arena	Cincinnati Bearcats	1989
Convocation Center	Athens	13,000	Arena	Ohio Bobcats	1968
Nutter Center	Dayton	10,464	Arena	Wright State Raiders	1990
Fifth Third Field	Toledo	10,300	Baseball	Toledo Mud Hens	2002
Cintas Center	Cincinnati	10,250	Arena	Xavier Musketeers	2000
Huntington Park	Columbus	10,000	Baseball	Columbus Clippers	2009
7 17 Credit Union Park	Akron	9,097	Baseball	Akron RubberDucks	1997
Savage Arena	Toledo	9,000	Arena	Toledo Rockets	1976
Day Air Ballpark	Dayton	8,500	Baseball	Dayton Dragons	2000
Huntington Center	Toledo	8,000	Arena	Toledo Walleye	2009
Millett Hall	Oxford	6,400	Arena	Miami RedHawks	1968
James A. Rhodes Arena	Akron	5,500	Arena	Akron Zips	1983
Taft Coliseum	Columbus	5,000	Arena	High school	1918

Former venues

- Cleveland Stadium (1931-1995; capacity: 83,000) – Cleveland Indians and Cleveland Browns
- Riverfront Stadium (1970-2002; capacity: 59,754) – Cincinnati Bengals and Cincinnati Reds
- Richfield Coliseum (1973–1994; capacity 20,273) – Cleveland Cavaliers, Cleveland Barons, and many others
- Cincinnati Gardens (1949–2016; capacity 10,208) – Cincinnati Royals, Cincinnati Bearcats, Xavier Musketeers, Cincinnati Cyclones, and many others

=== Gallery ===
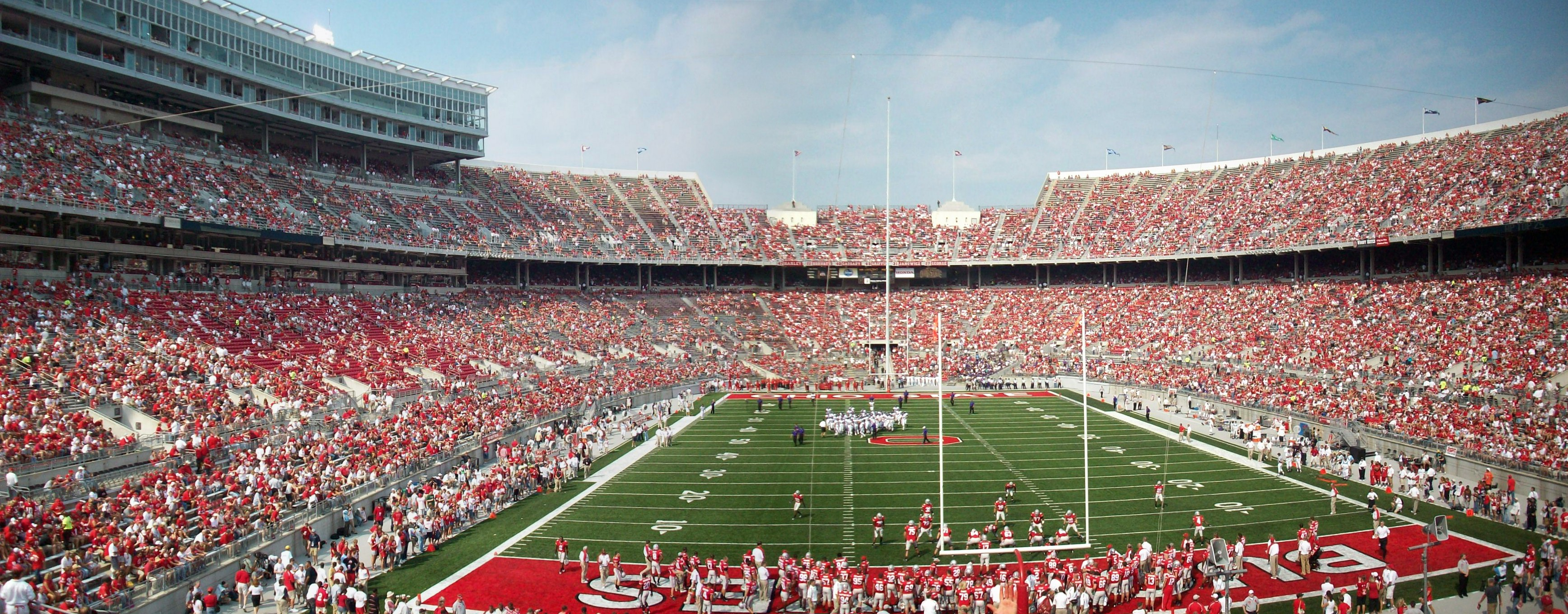
Ohio Stadium, home of the Ohio State Buckeyes football team

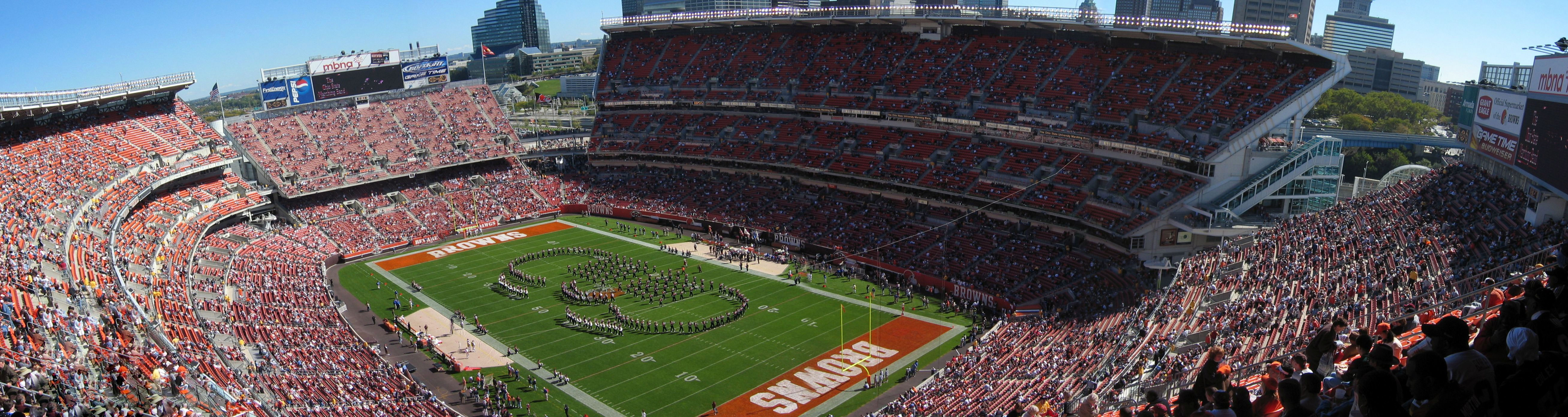
FirstEnergy Stadium, home of the Cleveland Browns football team

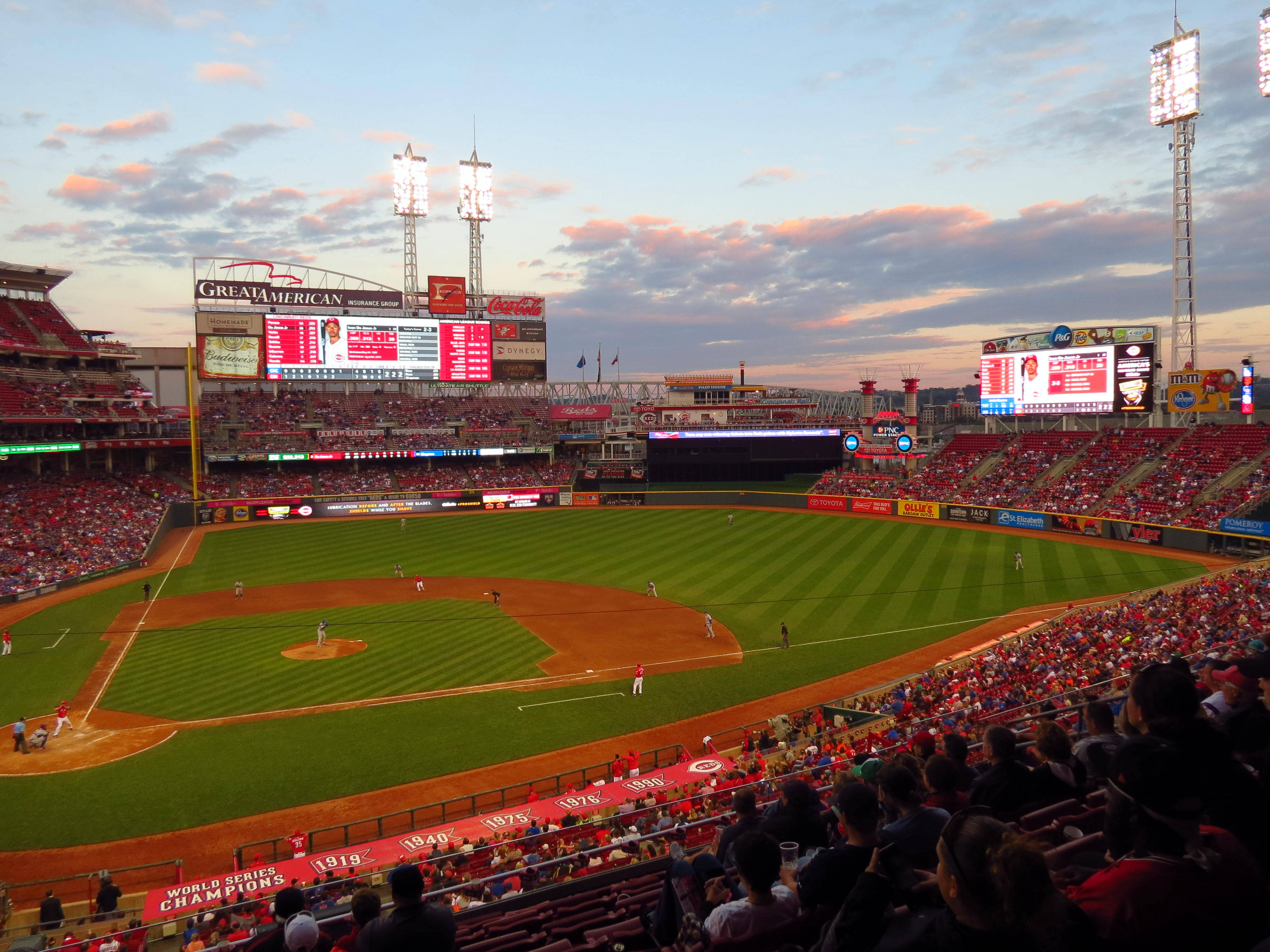
Great American Ball Park, home of the Cincinnati Reds baseball team

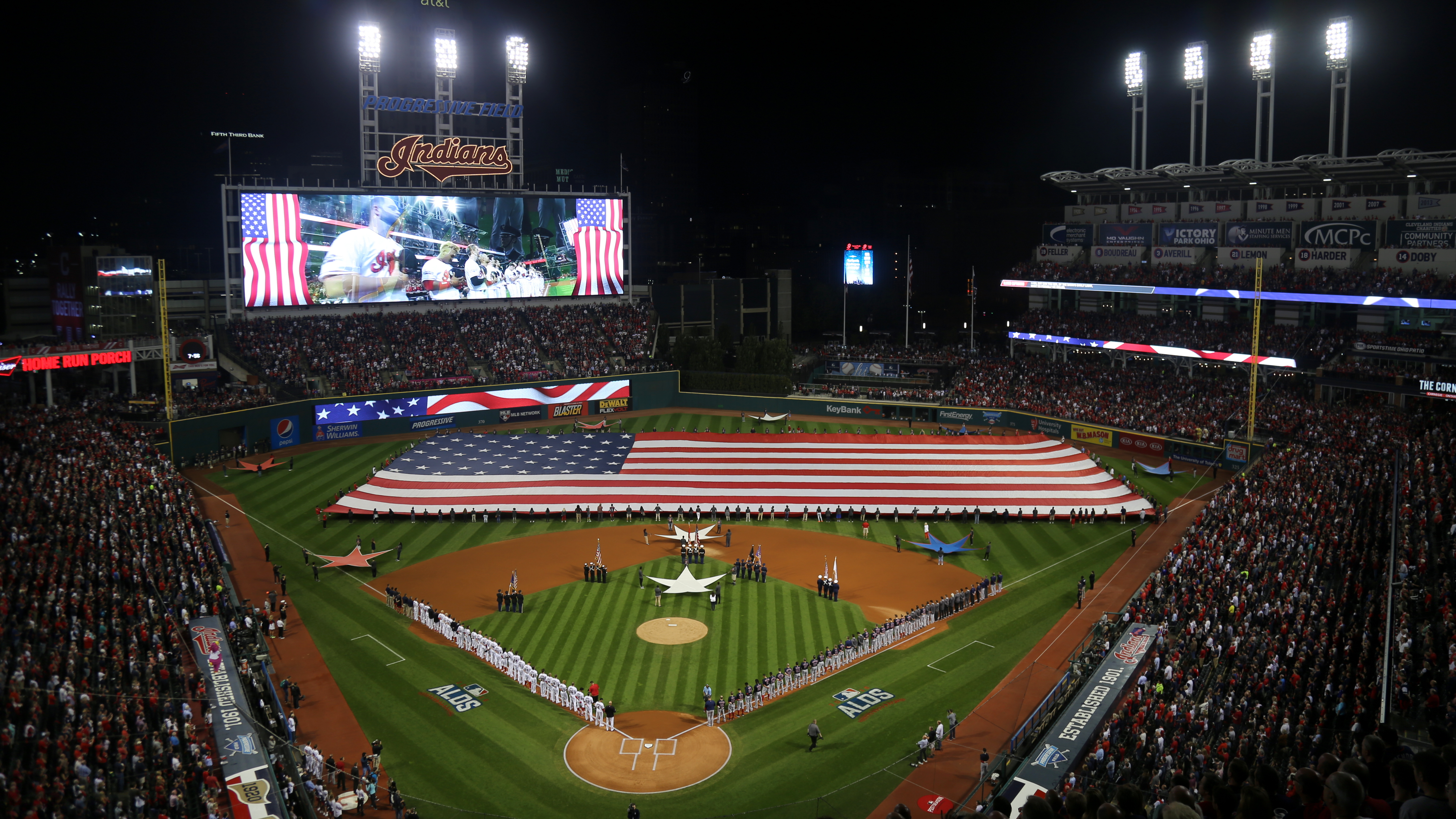
Progressive Field, home of the Cleveland Guardians baseball team

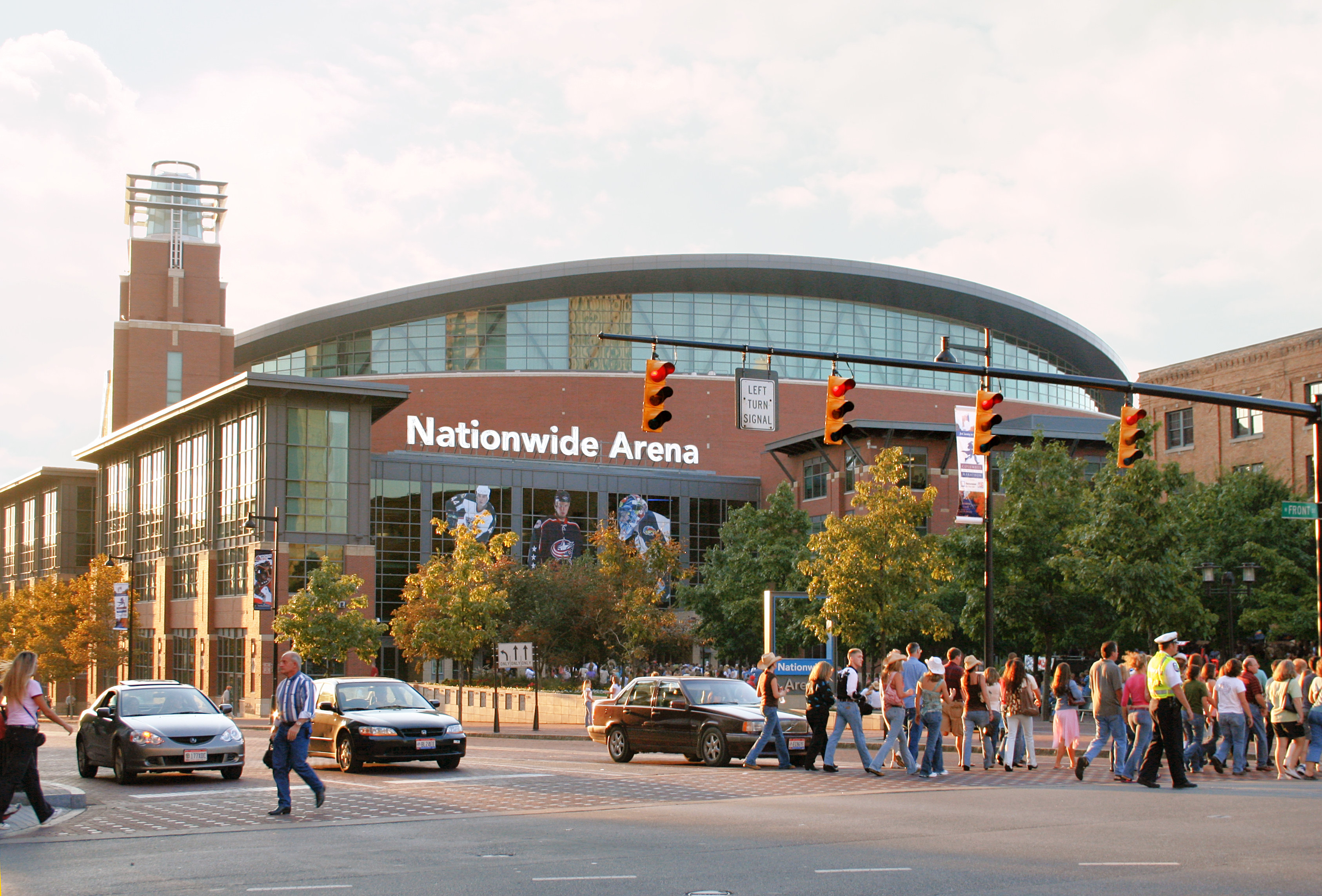
Nationwide Arena, home of the Columbus Blue Jackets.

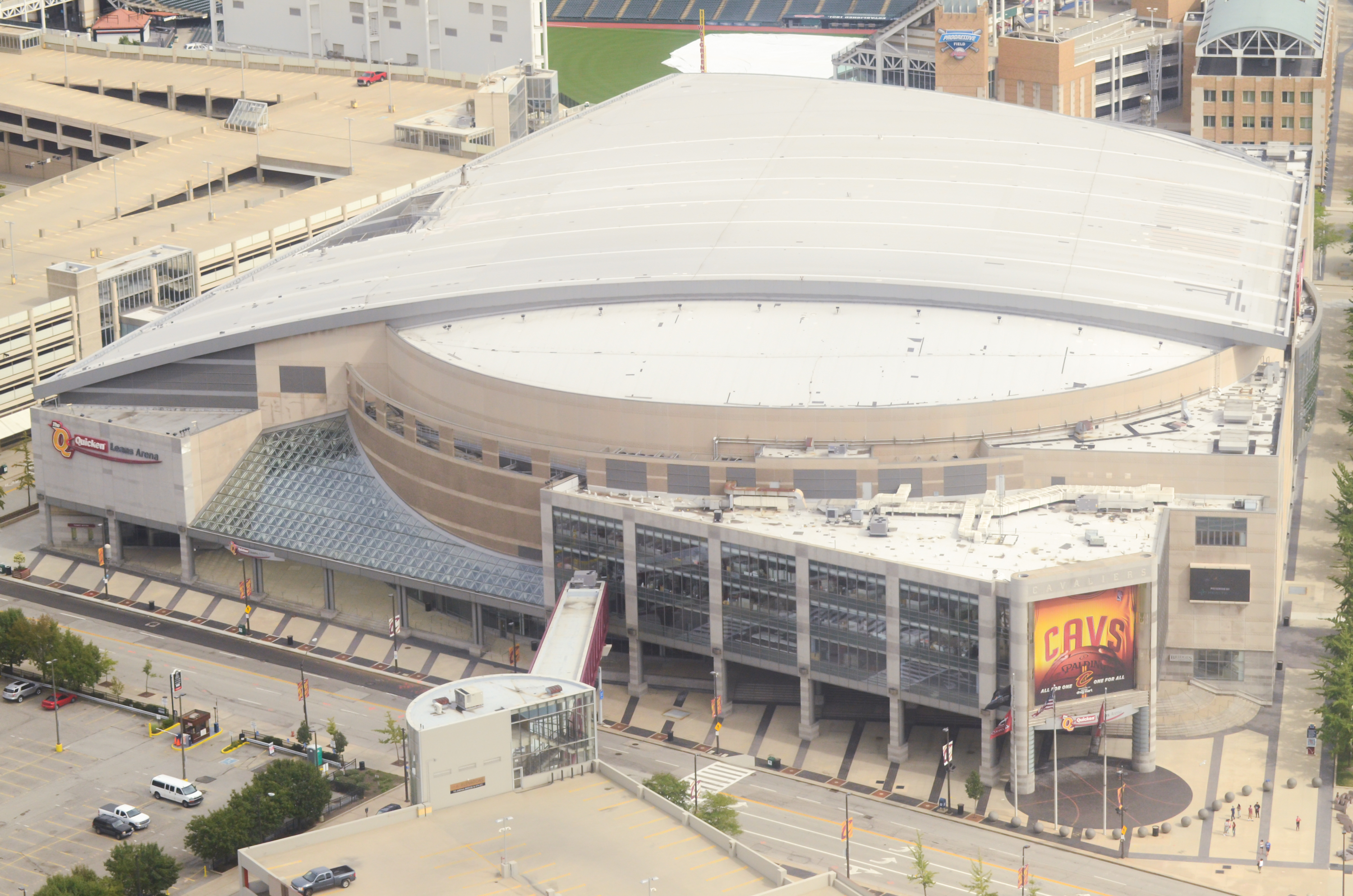
Rocket Arena, home of the Cleveland Cavaliers and Monsters

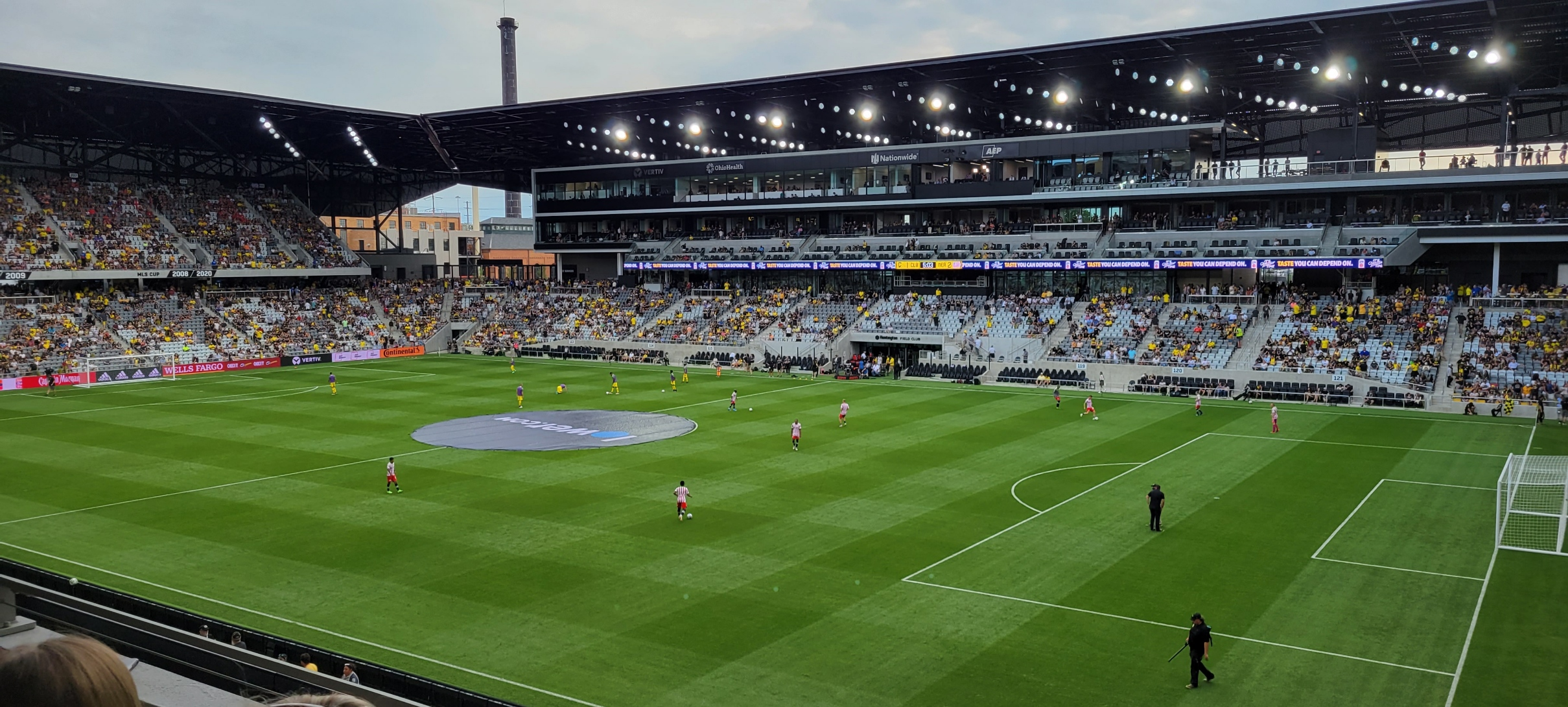
ScottsMiracle-Gro Field, home of Columbus Crew soccer

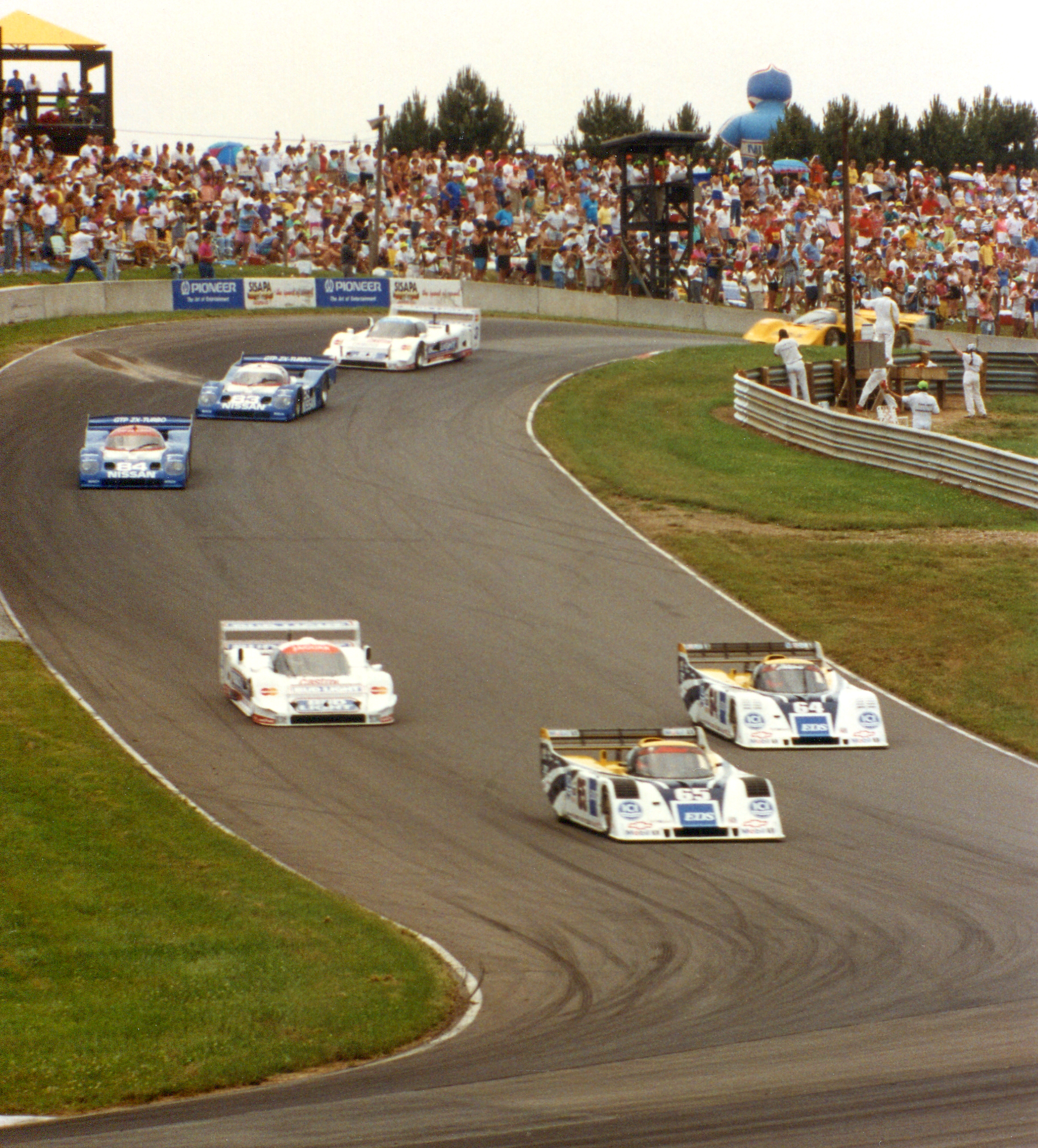
Mid-Ohio Sports Car Course

== See also ==
- Sports in Cincinnati
- Sports in Cleveland
- List of Sports Coaches From Youngstown, Ohio
