= James Anson Campbell =

- Born: September 11, 1854; Ohltown, Ohio
- Died: September 20, 1933 (aged 79); Youngstown, Ohio
- Occupation: Industrialist
- Known for: Youngstown Sheet and Tube

James Anson Campbell (September 11, 1854 – September 20, 1933) was an American business leader known for his role as chairman of Youngstown Sheet and Tube Company, one of the largest regional steel-production firms in the United States. Campbell served as director of the American Iron and Steel Institute during World War I.

== Early years ==
Born in the village of Ohltown, Ohio, Campbell suffered from tuberculosis as a child and was predicted to die at a young age. He recovered his health, however, and later excelled at sports such as baseball and boxing. As a young man, Campbell enrolled at Hiram College, where he studied business.

His early employment included stints as a hardware salesman and furniture store manager. In the late 19th century, Campbell settled permanently in Youngstown, Ohio, where he organized and managed the Youngstown Ice Company. He later became associated with the Trumbull Iron Company.

== Industrial career ==
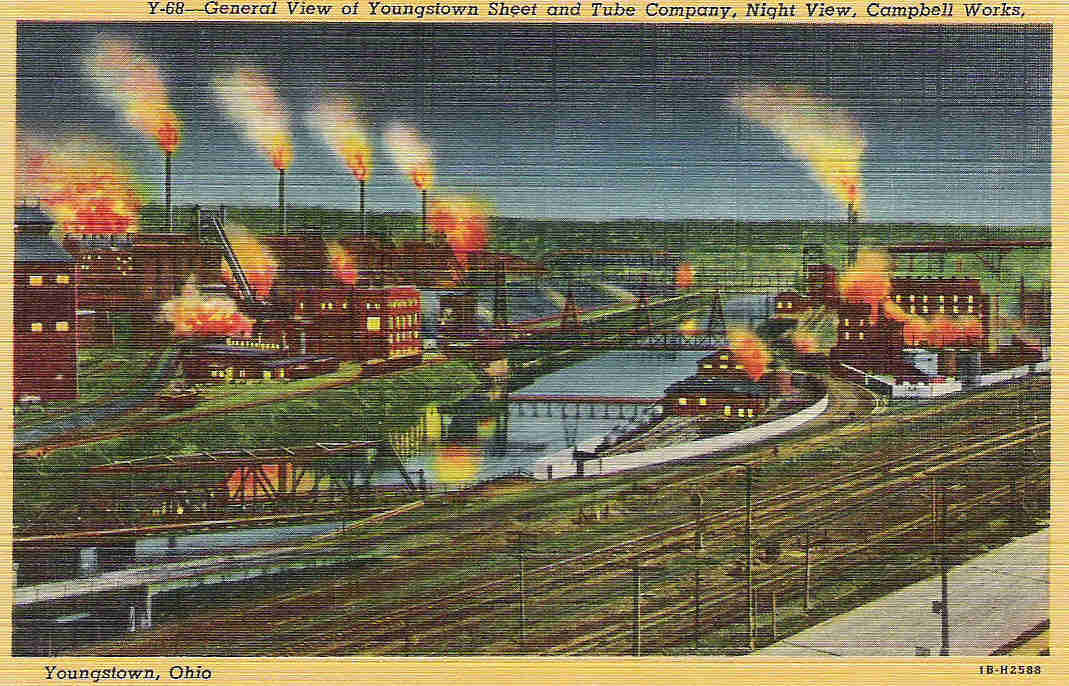
Youngstown Sheet & Tube Co., 1920s

Campbell became superintendent of the Mahoning Valley Iron Company in 1895 but resigned five years later, when the firm was absorbed by Republic Steel Company. In 1900, Youngstown industrialist George D. Wick appointed Campbell as secretary of what became the Youngstown Sheet and Tube Company. In 1902, Campbell rose to the position of vice president, and in 1904, he became president of the company.

Campbell led the Youngstown Sheet and Tube Company through a tumultuous period of labor strife that included the East Youngstown riot of 1916, a nationally reported incident that required the intervention of the National Guard. East Youngstown was officially renamed as Campbell in 1922. This gesture, while intended to honor James Campbell, reflected the community's desire to distance itself from the infamous riot.

As director of the American Iron and Steel Institute during World War I, Campbell was responsible for the allocation of steel tubular products. He later received the emblem of the French Legion of Honor for his wartime service. After the war, Campbell led Youngstown Sheet and Tube Company through the Steel Strike of 1919.

== Final years ==
Campbell's last years were marred by tragedy and disappointment. During World War I, the industrialist's only son, Louis J. Campbell, contracted a progressive disease while fighting in the trenches of France. The degenerative condition, which resulted in the amputation of Louis Campbell's right leg, forced the younger man to take frequent breaks from his position as treasurer of the Youngstown Sheet and Tube Company. Ultimately, Louis Campbell survived his father by less than two years.

Meanwhile, James Campbell was frustrated in his efforts to create what might have been the nation's second largest steel corporation. In 1931, he attempted to merge the Youngstown Sheet and Tube Company with Bethlehem Steel, a move that was bitterly, and successfully, opposed by other local industrialists. Opponents of the merger were backed financially by Cyrus S. Eaton, founder of Republic Steel, who feared the implications of a strengthened Bethlehem Steel.

James Campbell died on the evening of September 20, 1933, of an apparent stroke. Funeral services were held at his sprawling mansion in Liberty Township, Trumbull County, Ohio. Those who praised Campbell's achievements included Eugene Grace, president of Bethlehem Steel Company. "In the death of Mr. Campbell, the steel industry loses one of its outstanding personages", Grace said.
