= Campbell City School District =

Location
- 280 6th Street; Campbell, Ohio 44405; United States

Information
- Type: Public, Coeducational
- NCES District ID: 3904370
- Superintendent: Matthew Bowen
- Teaching staff: 82.10 (FTE)
- Grades: PK-12
- Enrollment: 1,050 (2024-25)
- Student to teacher ratio: 12.79
- Colors: Red and Black
- Team name: Red Devils
- Website: www.campbell.k12.oh.us

The Campbell City School District is a school district located in Campbell, Ohio, United States. The school districts consists of one high school and one elementary school.

== History ==
Campbell City School District was formed in the early 20th century, following a rise in population within the city of Campbell, Ohio, which stemmed from the rise of the steel industry.

Several elementary schools were built within the first half of the 20th century including the original Campbell Memorial High School in 1925. All schools within the district were demolished in the second half of the 20th century and the old high school was demolished in 2003.

In 2025, a new student wellness facility was announced, with Campbell City Schools receiving $10.5 million grant from Governor DeWine, as well as $2 million in a federal earmark to pay for the building. The wellness facility is set to open in August 2026.

== Schools ==
=== High school ===
- Campbell Memorial High School

=== Elementary school ===
- Campbell Elementary School

=== Former schools ===
- Fairview School
- Gordon School
- McCartney School
- Penhale School
- Reed School
- External links
