= Campbell, Ohio =

- City
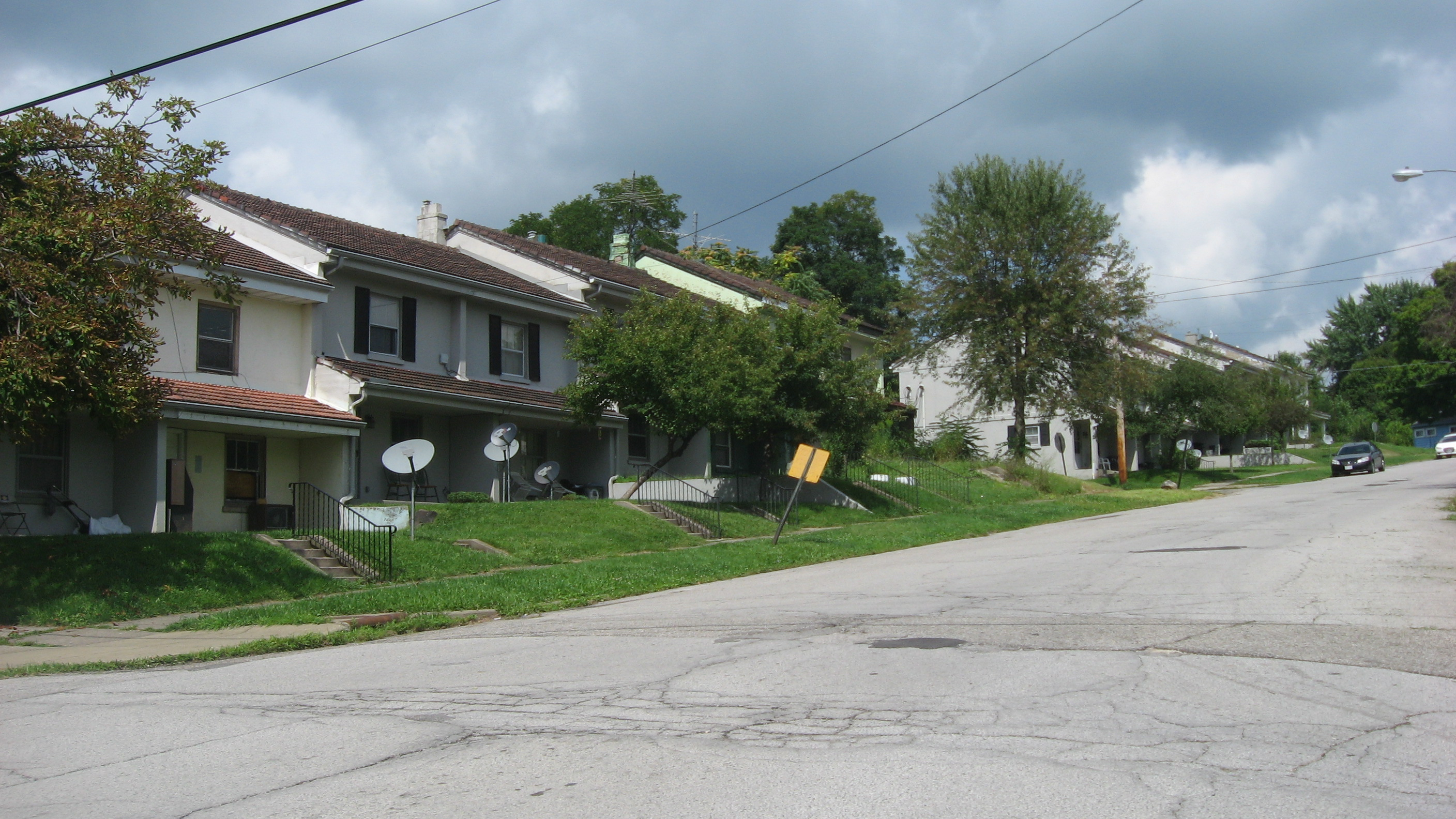
- Youngstown Sheet and Tube Company Houses on Jackson Street, known as "the company homes "

- Seal
- Nickname: Soup City
- Motto: "A Small City With a Big Heart"
- Interactive map of Campbell, Ohio
- Location within Ohio Location within the United States
- Coordinates: 41°04′40″N 80°35′25″W
- Country: United States
- State: Ohio
- County: Mahoning
- Incorporated: 1908

Government
  - Type: Mayor/Council
  - Mayor: Bill Valentino

Area
  - Total: 3.75 sq mi (9.71 km^{2})
  - Land: 3.72 sq mi (9.63 km^{2})
  - Water: 0.031 sq mi (0.08 km^{2})
- Elevation: 1,060 ft (320 m)

Population (2020)
  - Total: 7,852
  - Estimate (2023): 7,745
  - Density: 2,112.5/sq mi (815.63/km^{2})
- Time zone: UTC-5 (Eastern (EST))
  - Summer (DST): UTC-4 (EDT)
- ZIP code: 44405
- Area codes: 234/330
- FIPS code: 39-11066
- GNIS feature ID: 1086559
- Website: campbellohio.gov

Campbell (/ˈkæməl/ KAM-əl) is a city in eastern Mahoning County, Ohio, United States, along the Mahoning River. The population was 7,852 at the 2020 census. Located directly southeast of Youngstown, it is a suburb in the Youngstown–Warren metropolitan area.

Campbell was first called East Youngstown and this designation still appears on real estate deeds between 1902 and 1926, when the city was renamed for local industrialist James Campbell, then chairman of the Youngstown Sheet and Tube Company.

== History ==
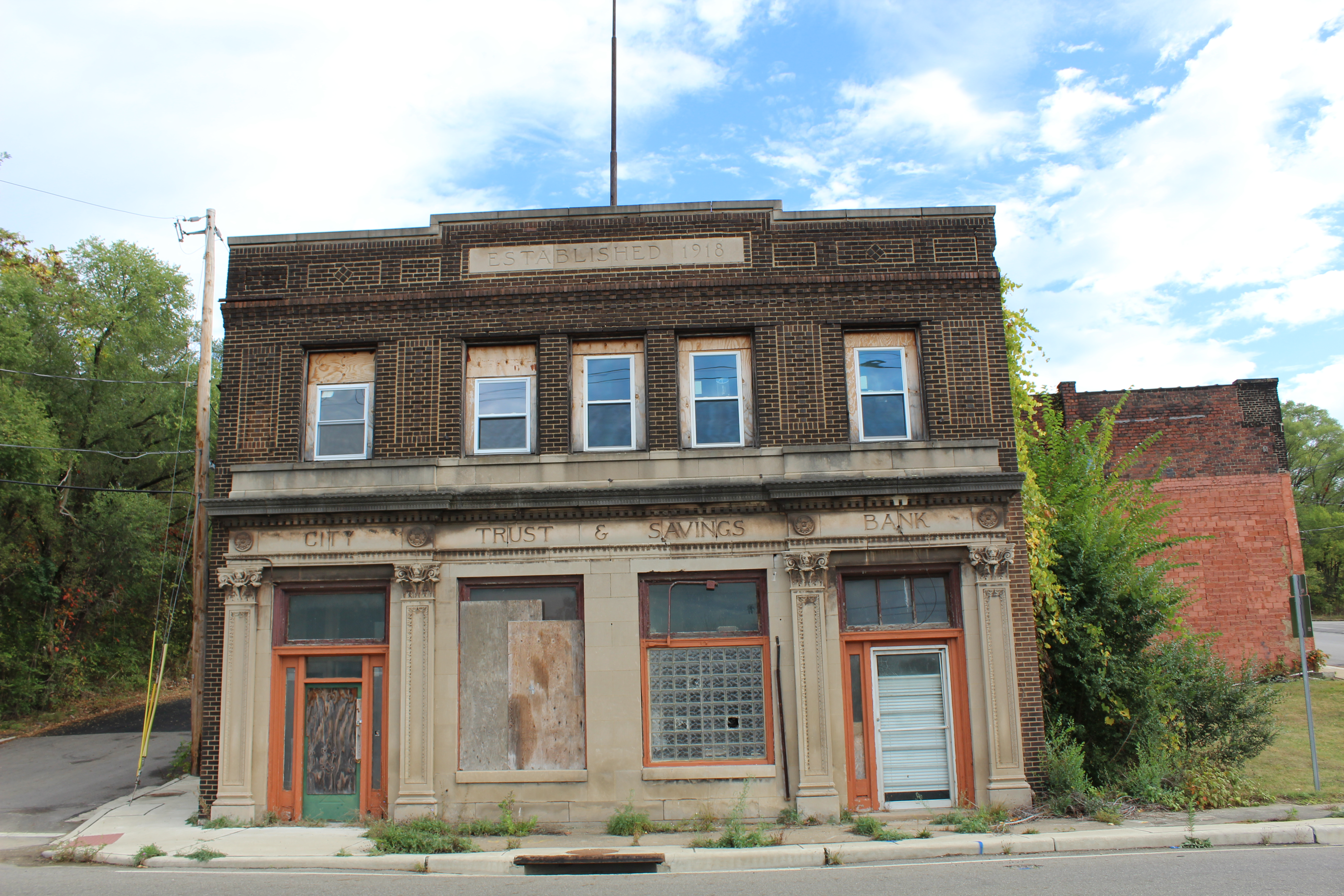
The City Trust & Savings Building on Wilson Avenue

In 1902, the Youngstown Iron Sheet and Tube Company established a factory near the Mahoning River in what was then Coitsville Township. A settlement grew around the factory, called East Youngstown, due to its location just southeast from downtown Youngstown. The village was incorporated in 1908, as its population swelled with young immigrants to work in the steel industry. Many immigrants to the village were Greeks.

The plant, which would later be known as the Campbell Works, contained four blast furnaces, twelve open hearth furnaces, several blooming mills, two Bessemer converters, a slabbing mill, a butt-weld tube mill, a 79-inch (2,000 mm) hot strip mill, seamless tube mills, and 9-inch (230 mm) and 12-inch (300 mm) bar mills. Due to the imbalance of ironmaking and steelmaking facilities at the two plants, rail shipments of molten iron "hot metal" were sent from Campbell to the company's Brier Hill Works from 1937 until 1979.

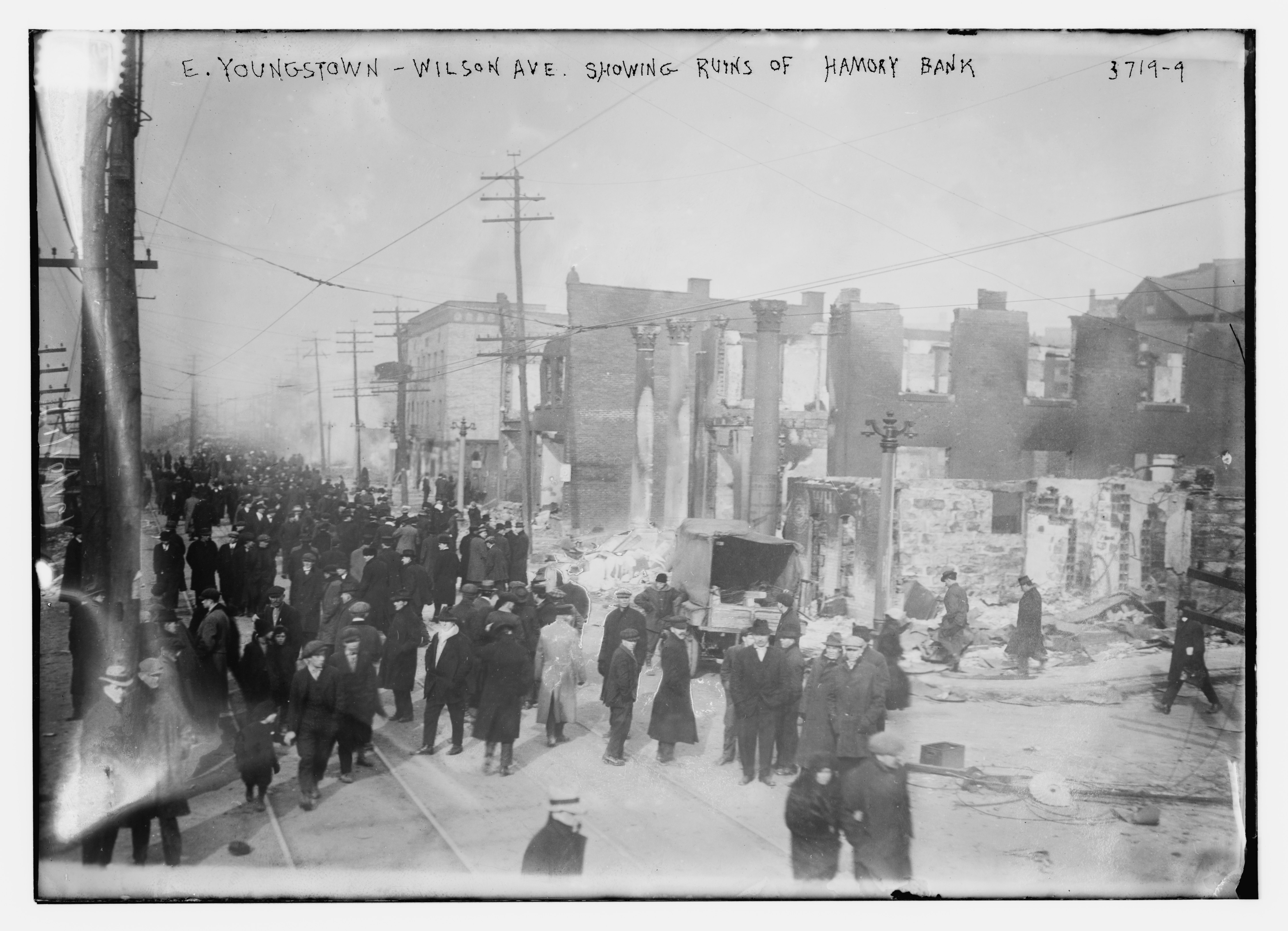
Ruins of the Harmony Bank building, 1910

In 1916, Sheet and Tube workers at the East Youngstown plant rioted during a strike over working conditions, which resulted in most of the town's business district being burned to the ground. The strike was quelled by the arrival of National Guard troops. After the riots, the company erected a series of townhouses known as The Youngstown Sheet And Tube Company Homes that were the first prefabricated concrete home development in the world. In 1926, the city was renamed to recognize James Anson Campbell, president of the iron company during the founding of the city.

The company abruptly closed its Campbell Works and furloughed 5,000 workers on September 19, 1977, a day remembered locally as "Black Monday."

Campbell is sometimes referred to as the "City of Churches" because of the wide variety of religious structures found throughout the community.

== Geography ==
Campbell is located on the north bank of the Mahoning River. The city has a total area of 3.74 square miles (9.69 km^{2}), of which 3.71 square miles (9.61 km^{2}) is land and 0.03 square miles (0.08 km^{2}) is water.

== Demographics ==
Historical population
Census	Pop.	Note	%±
1910	4,972		—
1920	11,237		126.0%
1930	14,673		30.6%
1940	13,785		−6.1%
1950	12,882		−6.6%
1960	13,406		4.1%
1970	12,577		−6.2%
1980	11,619		−7.6%
1990	10,038		−13.6%
2000	9,460		−5.8%
2010	8,235		−12.9%
2020	7,852		−4.7%
2023 (est.)	7,745		−1.4%

=== 2020 census ===
As of the 2020 census, Campbell had a population of 7,852 and a median age of 42.2 years. 22.3% of residents were under the age of 18 and 21.2% of residents were 65 years of age or older. For every 100 females there were 89.8 males, and for every 100 females age 18 and over there were 85.8 males age 18 and over.

Of the population, 50.7% were non-Hispanic White, 22.2% were non-Hispanic Black, 22.1% were Hispanic or Latino, 0.3% were Asian, and 4.7% were mixed or other.

99.7% of residents lived in urban areas, while 0.3% lived in rural areas.

There were 3,303 households in Campbell, of which 27.2% had children under the age of 18 living in them. Of all households, 33.2% were married-couple households, 21.2% were households with a male householder and no spouse or partner present, and 37.9% were households with a female householder and no spouse or partner present. About 32.9% of all households were made up of individuals and 16.2% had someone living alone who was 65 years of age or older.

There were 3,787 housing units, of which 12.8% were vacant. Among occupied housing units, 64.7% were owner-occupied and 35.3% were renter-occupied. The homeowner vacancy rate was 2.6% and the rental vacancy rate was 10.2%.

Racial composition as of the 2020 census
Race	Number	Percent
White	4,334	55.2%
Black or African American	1,857	23.7%
American Indian and Alaska Native	24	0.3%
Asian	17	0.2%
Native Hawaiian and Other Pacific Islander	4	0.1%
Some other race	693	8.8%
Two or more races	923	11.8%
Hispanic or Latino (of any race)	1,735	22.1%

=== 2010 census ===
As of the 2010 United States census, there were 8,235 people, 3,393 households, and 2,209 families in the city. The population density was 2,218/sqmi (857/km^{2}). There were 3,974 housing units at an average density of 1071/sqmi (413/km^{2}). The racial makeup of the city was 69.1% White, 21.2% African American, 0.3% Native American, 0.4% Asian, 5.2% from other races, and 3.8% from two or more races. Hispanic or Latino of any race were 15.8% of the population.

There were 3,393 households, of which 29.1% had children under the age of 18 living with them, 39.5% were married couples living together, 19.3% had a female householder with no husband present, 6.3% had a male householder with no wife present, and 34.9% were non-families. 31.2% of all households were made up of individuals, and 15.3% had someone living alone who was 65 years of age or older. The average household size was 2.43 and the average family size was 3.03.

The median age in the city was 41.5 years. 23.2% of residents were under the age of 18; 8.7% were between the ages of 18 and 24; 21.7% were from 25 to 44; 26.8% were from 45 to 64; and 19.6% were 65 years of age or older. The gender makeup of the city was 47.4% male and 52.6% female.

=== 2000 census ===
As of the 2000 United States census, there were 9,460 people, 3,729 households, and 2,602 families in the city. The population density was 2,548/sqmi (984/km^{2}). There were 4,099 housing units at an average density of 1,104/sqmi (426/km^{2}). The racial makeup of the city was 77.21% White, 16.69% African American, 0.10% Native American, 0.21% Asian, 3.48% from other races, and 2.32% from two or more races. Hispanic or Latino of any race were 10.97% of the population.

There were 3,729 households, out of which 28.3% had children under the age of 18 living with them, 45.9% were married couples living together, 18.2% had a female householder with no husband present, and 30.2% were non-families. 28.0% of all households were made up of individuals, and 16.5% had someone living alone who was 65 years of age or older. The average household size was 2.54 and the average family size was 3.10.

The city population contained 25.0% under the age of 18, 8.1% from 18 to 24, 23.9% from 25 to 44, 22.1% from 45 to 64, and 21.0% who were 65 years of age or older. The median age was 39.7 years. For every 100 females, there were 86.2 males. For every 100 females age 18 and over, there were 81.9 males.

The median income for a household in the city was $29,803, and the median income for a family was $37,500. Males had a median income of $33,558 versus $20,121 for females. The per capita income for the city was $17,981. About 16.1% of families and 18.3% of the population were below the poverty line, including 29.2% of those under age 18 and 8.2% of those age 65 or over.

76.8% spoke English, 8.7% Greek, 8.5% Spanish, 2.7% Italian, and 1.8% Slovak.

== Education ==
Children in Campbell are served by the public Campbell City School District, which includes one elementary/middle school and Campbell Memorial High School. Campbell has one public library, a branch of the Public Library of Youngstown and Mahoning County.

== Notable people ==
- Betty Allen, opera mezzo-soprano
- Andy Cvercko, National Football League guard
- The Edsels, doo-wop quartet
- Sloko Gill, National Football League center
- Ralph Goldston, National Football League and Canadian Football League running back and defensive back
- Johnny Kucab, Major League Baseball pitcher
- Mike Modak, Major League Baseball pitcher
- George D. Tablack, Member of the Ohio House of Representatives from the 52nd district
- William Toti, retired U.S. Navy captain, author, photographer and military technology corporate executive
- Melanie Valerio, former competition swimmer and Olympic gold medalist
