= Campbell Memorial High School =

Public high school in Ohio, United States

Coordinates: 41.082°N 80.600°W

Memorial High School

Location
- 280 6th Street; Campbell, Ohio 44405; United States

Information
- Type: Public, Coeducational high school
- Established: 1925
- School district: Campbell City School District
- Principal: Bradley Yeager
- Teaching staff: 29.50 (FTE)
- Grades: 9–12
- Enrollment: 257 (2024–2025)
- Student to teacher ratio: 8.71
- Colors: Red and black
- Athletics conference: Mahoning Valley Athletic Conference
- Team name: Red Devils
- Website: cmhs.campbell.k12.oh.us

Memorial High School (commonly referred to as Campbell Memorial High School) is a public high school located in Campbell, Ohio, United States. It is the only high school in the Campbell City School District. Athletic teams are known as the Red Devils and compete as a member of the Ohio High School Athletic Association in the Mahoning Valley Athletic Conference.

Following World War I, Memorial High School opened in 1925, and the name “Memorial” was chosen in honor of soldiers, reflecting common postwar naming practices.

Campbell Memorials current high school campus was built in 1971 on 6th Avenue. The 1925 building was demolished in 2003.

== Athletics ==
=== State championships ===
- Baseball – 1993
- Boys basketball – 1993

=== Associated Press poll champions ===
- Football – 1990

=== Facilities ===
Campbell Memorial Stadium

Campbell Memorial Stadium and is located behind the high school. Funded by the United States WPA program, the stadium was built in 1936 and underwent renovations in 2005. The stadium features a artificial turf field with the school's name and mascot on each side of the endzone, with a red "M" in the middle of the field, an electronic scoreboard, an all-season track and a seating capacity of 7,200 people.

== Notable alumni ==
- Bob Babich – former professional football player in the National Football League (NFL)
- Larry Carwell – former professional football player in the National Football League (NFL)
- Andy Cvercko – former professional football player in the National Football League (NFL)
- Jack Cvercko – former college football player
- Sloko Gill – former professional football player in the National Football League (NFL)
- Ralph Goldston – former professional football player in the National Football League (NFL)
