= Brier Hill =

Neighborhood in Youngstown, Ohio, United States

Coordinates: 41°07′41″N 80°40′16″W

Brier Hill is a neighborhood in Youngstown, Ohio, that was once viewed as the city's "Little Italy." The neighborhood, which was the site of the city's first Italian settlement, stretches along the western edge of Youngstown's lower north side and encircles St. Anthony's Church, an Italian-American Roman Catholic parish. Each year, at the end of August, the Brier Hill Fest attracts thousands of visitors from Northeast Ohio and Western Pennsylvania.

== Early history ==
The area encompassing the Brier Hill neighborhood was originally owned by Youngstown industrialist George Tod, who established a farm on the neighborhood's brier-covered hills around 1801. Tod called the agricultural enterprise Brier Hill. This semi-rural area was transformed irrevocably when coal was discovered in the hills in and around Brier Hill. The neighborhood drew thousands of immigrants seeking work in the mines, and Brier Hill became Youngstown's oldest working-class neighborhood.

The first iron furnace in the neighborhood was opened by the Tod family in 1847. By the 1880s, blast furnaces and rolling mills were established near the coal mines, a practical arrangement, given that Brier Hill mines provided coal for the mills. The surrounding neighborhood grew in tandem, as more housing was built for miners, iron workers, and their families. By the opening of the 20th century, the rapid expansion of the industry in Brier Hill had turned the area into the main entry point for Youngstown's immigrants. The largest groups were Italians, Welsh, Irish, Germans, and African Americans.

Given its relative isolation from downtown Youngstown, Brier Hill developed independently and established its own schools as well as a post office, and churches. During the early 20th century, the neighborhood hosted at least four churches. These included the Catholic parishes of St. Anthony's, St. Ann's, and St. Casimir's as well as the Episcopal parish of St. Rocco's. The neighborhood remained an unincorporated village (outside of Youngstown Township) until 1900, when it was absorbed by the city.

== Current challenges ==
Like many urban neighborhoods, Brier Hill faces an uncertain future. Beginning in the 1950s, large swaths of the neighborhood were razed to make way for urban renewal projects, including the building of modern expressways. Brier Hill was further depopulated by economic dislocations that came with the decline, and eventual collapse, of Youngstown's steel industry. Today, all that remains of a once-vibrant ethnic enclave is the ITAM Post (Italian-American War Veterans' Club), a bandstand, Modarelli's Salumeria, and the memorial wall. The ground floor of the ITAM Post was once the site of the Forde family butcher shop, owned and operated by Italian immigrants Frank and Catherine Forde (Fiordilisi). The structure's second floor served as the Fordes' residence, where they raised eight children. A concrete marker on the building's facade features the inscription, "Forde 1921".

== Other Italian enclaves ==
Although many neighborhoods and communities in the Youngstown area had large Italian-American populations—including Smoky Hollow, the near East Side, East Youngstown (now Campbell), Struthers, and Lowellville—Brier Hill was widely recognized as the city's unofficial Little Italy.

== Pizza ==
The neighborhood was the birthplace of "Brier Hill pizza", a home-style recipe with origins in the Basilicata region of Italy. Brier Hill pizza is prepared with a generous amount of thick "Sunday sauce", bell peppers and romano cheese, as opposed to the more typical mozzarella. It is one of several dishes the Youngstown area prides itself upon, in much the same way New Yorkers value their distinctive thin-crusted New York-style pizza.

== Neighborhood progress ==
Local activists from the Pro-Yo Party and the ITAM (Post 12) are working to make Brier Hill a Sister-City/"Cugin" Community of San Pietro Avellana (Isernia). San Pietro is a small village in the Apennine hills of Southeastern Italy that is the ancestral home of many Italian Americans in the Youngstown area.

== Notable residents ==
- James Farragher, Notre Dame football team coach (1902–1903)
- Jack Scheible, Major league baseball player (1893–1894)
- David Tod, Civil War governor of Ohio (1862–1864)

== See also ==
- Youngstown Neighborhoods
- Youngstown Sheet and Tube

Other Italian Neighborhoods in NE Ohio:

- Little Italy, Cleveland
- Lowellville, Ohio
