= James Farragher =

American football player and coach (1873–1949)

Biographical details
- Born: September 10, 1873; Youngstown, Ohio, U.S.
- Died: February 22, 1949 (aged 75); Youngstown, Ohio, U.S.

Playing career
- 1901: Notre Dame
- Position: Tackle

Coaching career (HC unless noted)
- 1902–1903: Notre Dame

Head coaching record
- Overall: 14–2–2

James Francis Farragher (September 10, 1873 – February 22, 1949) was an American college football player and coach. He played left tackle at the University of Notre Dame in the early 1900s. He is often identified in official university histories as the team's head coach for the 1902 and 1903 seasons. This claim remains controversial among sports historians, some of whom assign this honor to Farragher's teammate, All-American Louis J. Salmon, who served as team captain during the 1902 and 1903 seasons. Both men are routinely credited as acting coaches in official histories of the Notre Dame Fighting Irish football team.

== Early years ==
Farragher was born in Youngstown, Ohio, a steel-production center near the Pennsylvania border. He was raised in the working-class district of Brier Hill, on the city's near west side, and his family belonged to St. Ann's Roman Catholic Church. One brother, Mike Farragher, gained a reputation as a bare-knuckle boxer. Little else is known about James Farragher's years in Ohio.

Before arriving at Notre Dame, Farragher played for a number of other college teams, including Nebraska, Duquesne, and West Virginia. During his stint with the Nebraska Cornhuskers, he played under coach Fielding H. Yost. At some point, he lost an eye as a result of an athletic injury.

== Notre Dame ==
Farragher, despite his disability, proved a standout on Notre Dame's football team and was widely praised for his versatility. In 1901, the Notre Dame Scholastic observed that Farragher "made possible many gains for our backs by his ready way of opening up a hole in the line". The yearbook added: "Farragher was one of the mainstays of the team both on offensive and defensive work. In his position as tackle he has but few equals in the West. Jim rarely failed to gain when given the ball, and was a hard man to down when once started".

When his career on the gridiron ended, he remained in South Bend, Indiana, where he became a popular campus police officer. While it remains unclear whether Farragher ever served as head coach of the Notre Dame football team, his name began to appear in official school histories in the 1930s.

== Controversy ==
Chroniclers of Notre Dame sports history disagree on the validity of this claim. One skeptical observer, Murray Sperber, author of Shake Down the Thunder, speculates: "...when N.D. publicists began compiling the history of Notre Dame football, no one could ascertain who had coached in 1902 and 1903. Because Farragher had played on the team at the turn of the century and was a popular police officer on the Notre Dame campus in the 1930s, the publicists inscribed his name on one of the most prestigious lists in American sports–head football coach at Notre Dame".

Despite questions surrounding Farragher's status as coach, he was evidently a major participant in one of Notre Dame football's early "golden ages". As Sperber's text notes: "After the mediocre 1905 season–5–4 including bad losses to the in-state rivals–the Notre Dame Scholastic announced: 'The time has come when Notre Dame should take her rank in the old football world. The rank she had when Fortin and Farragher and Farley were playing here; the rank she had when Salmon, the invincible, tore through the opposition'".

James Farragher spent his last years in South Bend. He died in Youngstown, Ohio, on February 22, 1949, at the age of 75, after a three-month illness.

== Head coaching record ==
Year	Team	Overall	Conference	Standing	Bowl/playoffs
Notre Dame (Independent) (1902–1903)
1902	Notre Dame	6–2–1			
1903	Notre Dame	8–0–1			
Notre Dame:		14–2–2			
Total:		14–2–2			

== Sources ==
- Sperber, Murray (1993). Shake Down the Thunder: The Creation of Notre Dame Football. New York: Henry Holt and Company.
