= Sloko Gill =

American football player (1918–1995)

Sloko Gill (March 8, 1918 – December 22, 1995) was a standout center at Youngstown State University under coach Dwight "Dike" Beede in the late 1930s and early 1940s. He went on to play for the 1942 Detroit Lions, but his professional football career was interrupted by World War II.

== Early years ==
Gill was born into a Ukrainian-American family in the steel-manufacturing center of Campbell, Ohio. He gained early recognition as an athlete at Campbell Memorial High School, where he would eventually be inducted into their Athletic Hall of Fame, and was named an All-Ohio football player in his sophomore year by coaches and sportswriters.

== Collegiate and professional careers ==
He was recruited by the University of Tampa, but after less than a year, he chose to return to Ohio, where he served as captain of the then Youngstown College (now Youngstown State University) Penguins. Gill proved to be a tough and resilient player. He started in 35 games at YSU and played in each of the 140 quarters and was inducted into the Youngstown State University Athletic Hall of Fame as well.

Following his graduation, Gill was drafted by the Detroit Lions, where he served as a backup center for Alex Wojciechowicz. At the close of the season, Gill enlisted in the U.S. Marine Corps, a move that brought an end to his professional athletic career.

In his one NFL season Gill played in 11 games and tallied one interception.
