= Strip mill =

Type of steel mill

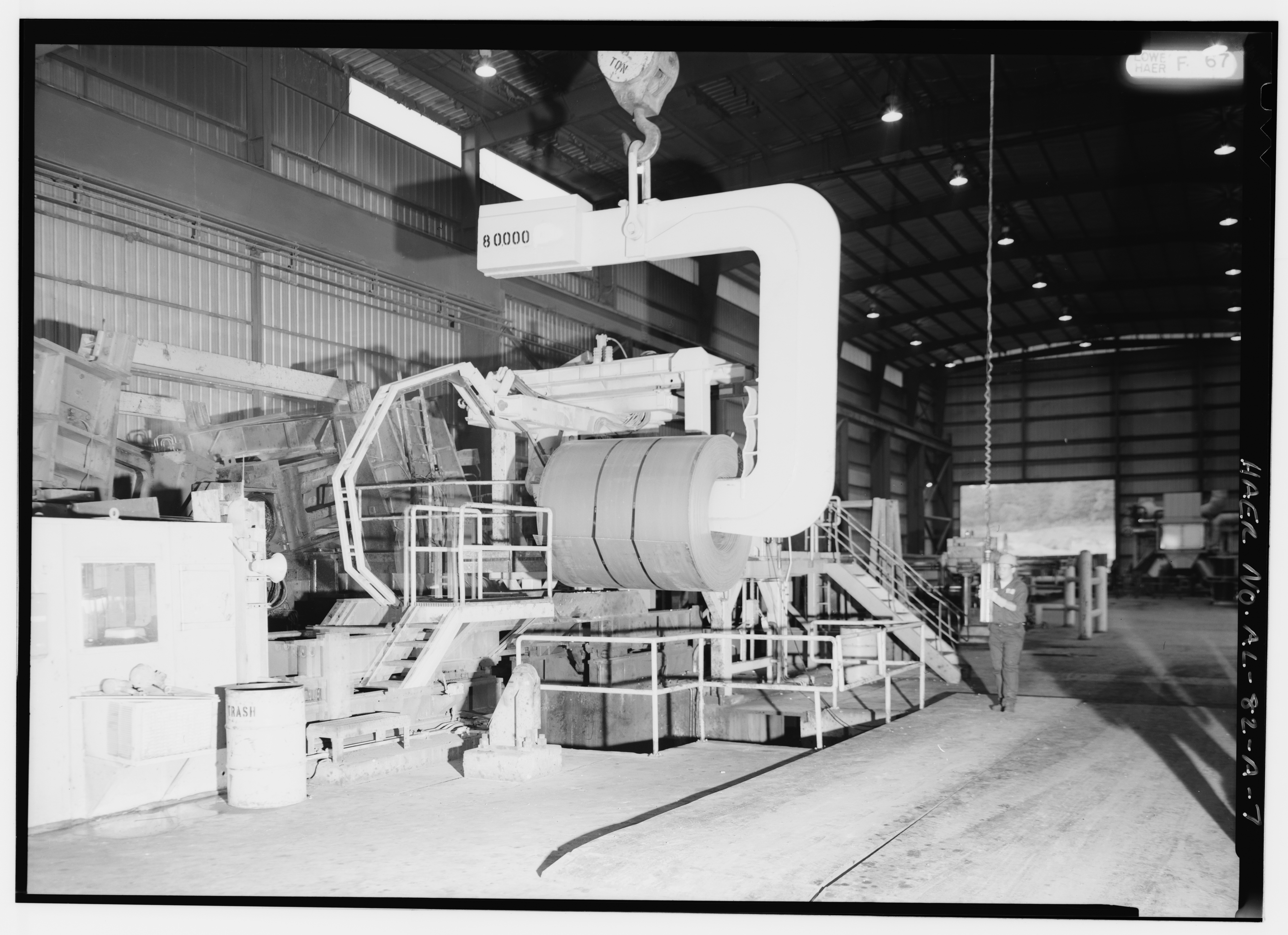
Central Iron Foundry, Hot Strip Mill Building, 1700 Holt Road, Holt, Tuscaloosa County, AL

The strip mill was a major innovation in steelmaking, with the first being erected at Ashland, Kentucky in 1923. This provided a continuous process, cutting out the need to pass the plates over the rolls and to double them, as in a pack mill. At the end the strip was cut with a guillotine shear or rolled into a coil. Early (hot rolling) strip mills did not produce strip suitable for tinplate, but in 1929 cold rolling began to be used to reduce the gauge further. The first strip mill in the United Kingdom was opened at Ebbw Vale in 1938 with an annual output of 200,000 tons.

The strip mill had several advantages over pack mills:

- It was cheaper due to having all parts of the process, starting with blast furnaces on the same site.
- Softer steel could be used.
- Larger sheets could be produced at lower cost and this reduced cost and enabled tinplate and steel sheet to be used for more purposes.
- It was capital intensive, rather than labour-intensive.

An Advanced type of such mill is now in production called "CSP Mill", where caster & Mill are an integral system saving lot of energy and fuel.
