= List of people from Youngstown, Ohio =

The following are notable people who were all born in, residents of, or otherwise closely associated with Youngstown, Ohio. Youngstown is a city in the U.S. state of Ohio and the county seat of Mahoning County. The municipality is situated on the Mahoning River, approximately 65 miles (105 km) southeast of Cleveland and 61 miles (100 km) northwest of Pittsburgh, Pennsylvania. Youngstown has its own metropolitan area, but the Pittsburgh Tri-State and Greater Cleveland influence the region. Youngstown lies 10 miles (16 km) west of the Pennsylvania state line, midway between New York City and Chicago.

The city was named for John Young, an early settler from Whitestown, New York, who established the community's first sawmill and gristmill. Youngstown is located in a region of the United States that is often referred to as the Rust Belt. Traditionally known as a center of steel production, Youngstown was forced to redefine itself when the U.S. steel industry fell into decline in the 1970s, leaving communities throughout the region without major industry. The 2010 census showed that Youngstown had a total population of 66,982, making it Ohio's ninth largest city. A U.S. Census Bureau estimate released in July 2019 placed the population at 65,469.

== Arts and entertainment ==
Name	Occupation	Notes
Sam Ayers	Actor	Born in Youngstown
Christopher Barzak	Author	Novelist, short story writer, attended Youngstown State University; resides in Youngstown
Stiv Bators	Singer and musician	Known for work with the punk rock band The Dead Boys; born and raised in Youngstown
Billy Beck	Musician	Keyboardist, pianist, and songwriter for the Original and New Ohio Players, as well as Zapp and Roger; graduate of Youngstown State University's Dana School of Music; raised on Youngstown's south side
Robert and Ronald Bell	Musicians	Members of funk and soul group Kool & the Gang; originally from Youngstown's east side
Pat Bilon	Actor	Appeared in Under the Rainbow and E.T.; born in Youngstown
Mark Boals	Musician	Vocalist, known for his work with Yngwie Malmsteen, Ring of Fire, and Royal Hunt; born in Youngstown
Mick Boogie	DJ	Official DJ of the Cleveland Cavaliers; born in Youngstown
Simeon Booker	Journalist	First African-American reporter for The Washington Post; journalist for Jet magazine; reported on the Civil Rights Movement, the Vietnam War, and the Youngstown Negro league baseball team; raised in Youngstown
Tiny Bradshaw	Musician	Jazz and rhythm and blues bandleader, known for 1950s "Train Kept A-Rollin'"; born in Youngstown
Lawrence Brownlee	Operatic tenor	Particularly associated with the bel canto repertoire; born in Youngstown
Joseph G. Butler, Jr.	Philanthropist	Founder of Youngstown's Butler Institute of American Art, the first American museum dedicated exclusively to American art; lived in Youngstown
Jordan Christopher	Actor and singer	Lead singer of The Wild Ones; born in Youngstown
Jay Clayton	Musician	Avant-garde vocalist and jazz educator; born in Youngstown
François Clemmons	Singer, actor, writer and teacher	Best known as "Officer Clemmons" on the television series Mister Rogers' Neighborhood, born in Birmingham, Alabama, and raised in Youngstown
Clay Cole	Radio personality	DJ and host of The Clay Cole Show, 1959–1968; born in Youngstown
Jim Cummings	Voice actor	Known for providing the voice of Winnie-the-Pooh and Tigger; originally from Youngstown's north side
Mark Dailey	Television host	TV and radio news journalist in Toronto, Ontario, Canada; voice actor for animated films including Medabots and The Ripping Friends; born in Youngstown; served briefly as Ohio state trooper
Tiffanie DeBartolo	Author, director	Writer and director of Dream for an Insomniac; born in Youngstown
John DeMain	Conductor	Former director of the Texas Opera Theater, Houston Grand Opera, and Opera Omaha; earned a Grammy for his recording of Porgy and Bess; born in Youngstown
Bob DiPiero	Songwriter	Has written 15 #1 country music hits for recording stars including the Oak Ridge Boys and former wife Pam Tillis; graduated from Youngstown State University; born and raised in Youngstown area
Donald Erb	Composer	Known for orchestral works such as "Concerto for Brass" and "Orchestra and Klangfarbenfunk"; born in Youngstown
Joe Flynn	Actor	Co-star of 1960s television series McHale's Navy; originally from Youngstown's north side
Stan Foster	Producer, actor, writer and director	Best known for his role in the TV series Tour of Duty, where he played Marvin Johnson for 3 seasons; born in Youngstown
Brian Gage	Author	Writes satire and fiction; born in Youngstown
Edmond Hamilton	Author	Pioneer science fiction writer; husband of screenplay writer Leigh Brackett; born in Youngstown
Grant E. Hamilton	Artist	Artist, political cartoonist; born in Youngstown
Dian Hart	Singer	Singer, recording artist and actor who recorded in 1960s and early 1970s; born in Youngstown
Elizabeth Hartman	Actress	Actress of the stage and screen; born in Youngstown
Tony Hinchcliffe	Comedian, writer, and podcaster	Comedian
Grace Keagy	Actress	Actress, best known for her work on the stage in character roles; born in Youngstown
Khaledzou	Music producer	Lead singer of indie rock band The Zou and member of the noise pop duo Munnycat; raised in Youngstown
Lady Miss Kier	Musician	Born Kierin Magenta Kirby, singer and DJ; known for work with early 1990s band Deee-Lite; later became an influential house and dance music writer and producer; born in Youngstown
Emanuel Kiriakou	Songwriter, musician, executive	He co-wrote and produced BillboardHot 100 charting singles; graduated from Youngstown State University
Sorche Nic Leodhas	Author	Writer of prizewinning children's books based on Scottish legend; recipient of Newbery Honor and Caldecott Medal; born in Youngstown
Nanette Lepore	Fashion designer	Born in Youngstown and attended Youngstown State University
Dave Malkoff	Journalist	Network television news correspondent for CBS News; originally from Liberty Township and Youngstown's north side
Omarosa Manigault-Stallworth	Television personality	Raised on the city's north side
Val Mayerik	Artist	Comic book artist; co-creator of Howard the Duck; born in Youngstown
Maureen McGovern	Singer and actress	Known for "The Morning After" from the film The Poseidon Adventure and her ongoing recording, performance and stage career; born and raised in Youngstown
Michael McGovern	Author	A product of Youngstown's 19th-century steel mills who became nationally known as "the Puddler Poet"
Michael J. Moritz Jr.	Producer and musical director	Producer of 2013 Broadway musical Beautiful: The Carole King Musical and 2013 Broadway musical A Night with Janis Joplin; also musical director for many musicals and cabaret shows
Booker Newberry III	Musician	Member of mid-1970s soul groups Sweet Thunder ("Baby I Need Your Love Today") and Impact; born in Youngstown
Ed O'Neill	Actor	Known for TV series Modern Family and playing Al Bundy on Married... with Children; originally from Youngstown's north side
Sonny Parker	Musician	Blues and jazz singer, dancer and drummer who performed with Lionel Hampton; born in Youngstown
Michael Pataki	Actor	Veteran of television shows including The Green Hornet, The Flying Nun, McCloud, and Star Trek; born in Youngstown
Anthony Peck	Actor	Appeared in Die Hard, The Hunt for Red October, Last Action Hero, and Die Hard with a Vengeance; born in Youngstown
Michelle Pesce	DJ	International performances; born in Youngstown
Jane Randolph	Actress	Known for leading roles in low-budget film noir classics such as Cat People; born in Youngstown
Olga Rudge	Musician	Concert violinist; known in early years for recovering lost works of Italian composer Antonio Vivaldi; later gained notoriety as the long-term lover of expatriate poet Ezra Pound; born in Youngstown
Bill Saluga	Comedian	Known for character of Ray J. Johnson, who appeared on popular Miller Lite commercials in the 1980s; from Youngstown
Rae Samuels	Vaudeville entertainer	Known as "the Blue Streak of Vaudeville", born in Youngstown
Victor Slezak	Actor	Appeared in The Bridges of Madison County and The Devil's Own; portrayed John F. Kennedy in science fiction cult classic Timequest; appeared in several episodes of Law & Order; audiobook narrator; born in Youngstown
David C. Smith	Author	Author of fantasy, horror, and suspense fiction; medical editor; essayist; born in Youngstown
Ross H. Spencer	Author	Mystery writer best remembered for satirical spoofs of private eye genre; lived in Youngstown
Michael Trikilis	Film producer	Playboy TV pioneer; film producer; born and raised in Youngstown
Rick Ungar	Writer, executive producer	Known for producing animated TV series Biker Mice From Mars; born in Youngstown
Paula Wagner	Film producer	Formed Cruise/Wagner Productions with film star Tom Cruise, which produced The Last Samurai, War of the Worlds, and the Mission: Impossible sequels; born in Youngstown
Jennifer Walcott	Actress	Limited film appearances; Playboy centerfold model, raised in Youngstown
Bob Walker	Photographer	Nature photographer and environmental activist; grew up in Youngstown
Albert Warner	Movie pioneer	Co-founder of Warner Bros. Studios; lived on Youngstown's north side
Harry Warner	Movie pioneer	Co-founder of Warner Bros. Studios; lived on Youngstown's north side
Jack L. Warner	Movie pioneer	Co-founder and eventual head of Warner Bros. studios; raised on Youngstown's north side
Sam Warner	Movie pioneer	Co-founder of Warner Bros.; procured technology for first feature-length talking picture; spent youth and early adulthood on Youngtown's north side
Mel Watkins	Author	Known for memoir Dancing with Strangers; raised on Youngstown's south side
James Weidman	Jazz pianist	Born in Youngstown

== Musical groups ==
Name	Style	Notes
The Edsels	Doo-wop	Their song "Rama Lama Ding Dong" peaked at number 21 on the Billboard Hot 100 chart; from the Youngstown area
Gil Mantera's Party Dream	Synth pop	Known for their spectacular live shows and as part of the Van's Warped Tour; Ultimate Donny and Gil Mantera were born and raised in Youngstown
Glass Harp	Rock	From the Youngstown area
The Human Beinz	Rock and roll	Members of the 1960s singing group known for their hit single "Nobody but Me"; from Youngstown
Cherry Monroe	Alternative / glam	Debut single "Satellites" reached #85 on Billboard Hot 100 in 2005; from Youngstown
MUNNYCAT	Noise pop	Music has been featured over 100 times by brands such as EA Sports's FIFA 19, New Balance, Wendy's, eBay, Xbox, JCPenney, and Target; both members were raised in Youngstown
Youngstown	Rock/pop	From Youngstown and nearby Campbell, Ohio

== Business ==
Name	Occupation	Notes
Harry Burt	Confectioner	Created the Good Humor ice cream bar in the early 1920s, developed and introduced product in Youngstown
Joseph G. Butler, Jr.	Industrialist	Co-owner of the Ohio Steel Company, one of Youngstown's earliest steel manufacturers, and founder of the Butler Institute of American Art; lived in Youngstown
William M. Cafaro	Developer	Pioneer in construction of strip malls and enclosed malls, including the Eastwood Mall; born on Youngstown's east side
William H. Calbreath	Advertising icon	Presumed model for the Cream of Wheat trademark; lived and died in Youngstown
James A. Campbell	Industrialist	Co-founder of Youngstown Sheet and Tube Company; Campbell, Ohio, was named in his honor
Edward J. DeBartolo Sr.	Contractor and developer	Played a pioneering role in the development of the modern shopping mall; born and raised in Youngstown
Mary Wells Lawrence	Advertising executive	Developed iconic advertising campaigns of the 1960s; youngest person inducted into the Copywriter's Hall of Fame; born in Youngstown
Michael I. Monus	Discount chain entrepreneur	Co-founded the Phar-Mor discount drug chain, which had 200 outlets across the country before its dissolution in the early 1990s; born in Youngstown
Jon P. Ruggles	Business executive	Architect behind Delta Air Lines becoming a major player in energy trading; generated more than a billion dollars in profits; subject of the first insider-trading case for the CFTC, settling out of court without an admission of wrong-doing
Ella P. Stewart	Pharmacist	One of the first African-American female pharmacists in the United States; resided in Youngstown
George D. Wick	Industrialist	Organized the Youngstown Sheet and Tube Company with James A. Campbell; was among prominent figures who died during the sinking of the Titanic on its maiden voyage
Roosevelt Zanders	Entrepreneur	

== Education ==
Name	Occupation	Notes
Salvatore Attardo	Professor	Professor at Youngstown State University and editor-in-chief of Humor, the journal for the International Society of Humor Research
G. William Domhoff	Sociologist	Known for controversial 1960s bestseller Who Rules America?; born in Youngstown
Louis Hartz	Political scientist	Known for 1955 classic The Liberal Tradition in America; born in Youngstown
Arthur Laffer	Economist	Former University of Southern California faculty member, known for controversial "Laffer curve"; born in Youngstown
William Holmes McGuffey	Educator	Known for development of McGuffey Readers; received early education in Youngstown
Ernest Carroll Moore	Educator	Co-founder of University of California, Los Angeles, born in Youngstown
Michael D. Morley	Educator	Known for Morley's categoricity theorem; born in Youngstown
Morris Slavin	Historian	Wrote five well-regarded historical works on the French Revolution; taught at Youngstown State University
Richard D. Wolff	Economist	Heterodox economist known for Marxian contributions

== Military ==
Name	Occupation	Notes
Giles B. Harber	US naval officer	Former rear admiral in the United States Navy; former commander in chief of the United States Pacific Fleet; born in Youngstown
Fred Moosally	US naval officer	Former captain in the United States Navy; served in many different assignments, including commander of a destroyer and the battleship USS Iowa; born in Youngstown
Wilbur F. Simlik	Marine Corps officer	Major general in the Marine Corps; participated in three wars; decorated with Silver Star for bravery during World War II; born in Youngstown

== Politics ==
Name	Occupation	Notes
Amy Acton	Public health director and governor-elect of Ohio	Born in Youngstown, attended Liberty High School
Frank J. Battisti	Judge	U.S. District Court for the Northern District of Ohio (1961–1994); known for rulings on Cleveland's school desegregation case; born and raised in Youngstown
John Boccieri	Lawmaker	Served in the Ohio House of Representatives's 61st District, 2000–2006; ran unopposed for a seat in the Ohio State Senate in 2006; born in Youngstown
Henry Lawrence Burnett	U.S. assistant judge advocate general	Brevet brigadier general; prosecutor in trials for assassination of Abraham Lincoln; born in Youngstown
Capri Cafaro	Lawmaker	Ohio state senator from 32nd District; from Youngstown
Charles J. Carney	Lawmaker	U.S. Representative 1970–1979; member of the Ohio Senate 1950–1970; born in Youngstown
William J. Carney	Legislator	U.S. Navy signalman and member of the Ohio General Assembly 1959–1960 and 1961–1962
John Hessin Clarke	U.S. Supreme Court justice	Appointed Supreme Court justice by President Woodrow Wilson, practiced law in Youngstown and was part-owner of The Youngstown Vindicator
John G. Cooper	Lawmaker	U.S. representative, 1915–1937; resided in Youngstown
Ronald Daniels	Activist	Third-party candidate for president of the United States; executive director of Center for Constitutional Rights; graduate of Youngstown State University
Marc Dann	Attorney	Former Ohio attorney general, elected to the position in 2006 as a Democrat; lives in nearby Liberty; practiced law in Youngstown before public office
Clarence Darrow	Attorney	Known for role as defense counsel in the Scopes Monkey Trial and Leopold and Loeb murder trial; first practiced law in Youngstown
James Arthur Ewing	Steel executive	40th governor of American Samoa
Bob Hagan	Lawmaker	Scion of an Ohio Democratic political family whose defeat in Youngstown's 2005 mayoral race was followed by a successful run for Ohio state representative
Robert Hagan	Lawmaker	Served three terms in the Ohio House of Representatives; served as Trumbull County commissioner; on traveling staff of vice presidential nominee Sargent Shriver in 1972; born in Youngstown
Tim Hagan	Lawmaker	Cuyahoga County, Ohio commissioner; Democratic candidate for governor of Ohio in 2002; born in Youngstown
Gus Hall	Activist	Co-founder of the United Steelworkers of America trade union; five-time U.S. presidential candidate; organized 1930s Little Steel Strike in Youngstown-Warren area
Martin J. Hillenbrand	Diplomat	U.S. ambassador to the Federal Republic of Germany, 1972–1976; born in Youngstown
Nathaniel R. Jones	Judge	U.S. Court of Appeals, Sixth Circuit; appointed in 1967 as assistant general counsel to President Lyndon B. Johnson's famed Kerner Commission; born and raised in Youngstown
James Kennedy	Lawmaker	U.S. representative 1903–1911; resided in Youngstown
Michael J. Kirwan	Lawmaker	Member of U.S. House of Representatives (1937–1970); first Northerner to serve as chair of the influential National Democratic Congressional Campaign Committee; widely credited with Democratic congressional victory of November 1954
Staughton Lynd	Activist	Known for public opposition to the Vietnam War; served as labor lawyer and activist in the Youngstown area, where he currently resides
George McKelvey	Politician	Former Democratic mayor of Youngstown; in 2004, he broke ranks with his party to endorse President George W. Bush for a second term
George McMillin	Governor and admiral	38th and final naval governor of Guam; POW during World War II after surrendering at the First Battle of Guam; later a rear admiral
Volney Rogers	Attorney and civic leader	Played a key role in the establishment of Youngstown's celebrated Mill Creek Park
William R. Stewart	Lawmaker	Second African-American to serve in the Ohio Senate; first African-American attorney to establish a practice in Youngstown
Hal Suit	Television broadcaster	Republican candidate for governor of Georgia, 1970, lost to Jimmy Carter
Robert W. Tayler	Lawmaker and judge	U.S. representative, 1895–1903; in 1905 appointed by Theodore Roosevelt as district judge of the Northern District of Ohio; lived in Youngstown
Sue Thomas	FBI Agent	First deaf person to work in this capacity, and the inspiration for the television series Sue Thomas: F.B. Eye
David Tod	Ohio governor	Respected by President Abraham Lincoln for his measured response to dislocations of the American Civil War; was offered (but refused) the position of U.S. Secretary of Treasury
James A. Traficant, Jr.	Lawmaker	Former Democratic representative; was sent to federal prison after being prosecuted by the federal government on corruption charges; born and raised on Youngstown's south side
Jay Williams	Politician	Independent-Democrat; first African-American mayor of Youngstown; born on the city's east side; now resides near Cornersburg, on city's west side

== Religion ==
Name	Occupation	Notes
George Bennard	Evangelist	Composer of "The Old Rugged Cross"; born in Youngstown
Joan Brown Campbell	Christian minister and ecumenical leader	First ordained woman to be National Council of Churches president; born in Youngstown
Edward Mooney	Catholic cardinal	Archbishop of Detroit from 1937 until his death in 1958; raised on the north side of Youngstown
George Murry	Catholic bishop	First African-American bishop of the Diocese of Youngstown
Frank Schulman	Unitarian Universalist minister	Published several well-regarded books on the Unitarian tradition; served as Unitarian pastor in Youngstown

== Science ==
Name	Occupation	Notes
Thomas Bopp	Amateur astronomer	Co-discoverer of Comet Hale–Bopp in 1995; graduate of Youngstown State University
Jerri Nielsen, M.D.	Physician	Doctor and author, known for Ice Bound, the New York Times bestseller on the medical crisis she endured while trapped at a South Pole research station; born and raised in the Youngstown area
Ronald A. Parise, Ph.D.	NASA astronaut, payload specialist	Graduate of Youngstown State University

== Sports ==
Name	Occupation	Notes
Tyler Allgeier	Football player	Running back for the Atlanta Falcons; born in Youngstown
Red Ames	Baseball player	Played for the New York Giants, Cincinnati Reds, St. Louis Cardinals, and Philadelphia Phillies, 1903–1919; from Youngstown-Warren area
Cameron Argetsinger	Auto racing executive	Created the Watkins Glen Grand Prix Race Course; born in Youngstown
Harry Arroyo	Boxer	IBF Lightweight Champion of the World (1984 and 1985); born and raised in Youngstown
Russell "Busty" Ashbaugh	Football coach	Squad captain at Brown University; coach at Youngstown's South High School; mentor to collegiate and professional players including Bob Dove; trainer of coaches including Youngstown State University's Dwight "Dike" Beede and Ohio State University's Wes Fesler
Russell "Pete" Ashbaugh	Football player	Member of the University of Notre Dame's 1946 and 1947 national championship teams; drafted by the Pittsburgh Steelers; played professionally for the Chicago Rockets; from Youngstown
Bob Babich	Football player	Played for the San Diego Chargers and the Cleveland Browns 1970–1978; born in Youngstown
Floyd Baker	Baseball player	Played for the St. Louis Browns, Washington Senators, Chicago White Sox, Boston Red Sox, and the Philadelphia Phillies, 1943–1955; lived and died in Youngstown
Dwight "Dike" Beede	Football coach	Celebrated head coach at Youngstown State University, 1938–1972; inventor of the penalty flag
Tommy Bell	Boxer	Fought for welterweight title against Sugar Ray Robinson in 1946; born in Youngstown
Dan Benish	Football player	Played for Atlanta Falcons and Washington Redskins 1983–1987; born in Youngstown
Lynn Bowden	Football player	American football wide receiver for the New Orleans Saints of the National Football League (NFL); born in Youngstown
Rich Buzin	Football player	American football offensive tackle who played five seasons in the National Football League with the New York Giants, Los Angeles Rams and Chicago Bears; born in Youngstown
Walt Cassidy	Football player	Played for the Kenosha Maroons in 1924
Roy Castleton	Baseball player	Played for New York Highlanders and Cincinnati Reds, 1907–1910; gained national recognition for pitching a perfect game for the Youngstown Ohio Works ball club
Matt Cavanaugh	Football player	Played for the New England Patriots, San Francisco 49ers, Philadelphia Eagles, and New York Giants, 1978–1991; born and raised on Youngstown's west side
Maurice Clarett	Football player	Former Ohio State University football standout; from Youngstown-Warren area
Bob Commings	Football coach	Led Iowa Hawkeyes to a 12-10 upset victory over UCLA in 1974; born in Youngstown
Bob Davie	Football coach	Former head coach and defensive coordinator of the University of Notre Dame football team; current football analyst for ESPN and ABC; graduate of Youngstown State University
Edward J. DeBartolo Jr.	Owner	Former owner of the San Francisco 49ers; born in Youngstown
Bob Dove	Football player and coach	College Football Hall of Fame, All-America end at the University of Notre Dame; eight seasons in the NFL for the Chicago Cardinals and Detroit Lions, 1948–1954; assistant coach at Youngstown State University; born in Youngstown
Dave Dravecky	baseball player	Former American professional baseball player, for the San Diego Padres and San Francisco Giants; born in Youngstown
William Thomas "Mother" Dunn	Football player	First outstanding linebacker in the history of Penn State Nittany Lions football; born in Youngstown
Doc Elliott	Football player	All-American at Lafayette College who went on to play for Canton Bulldogs, Cleveland Bulldogs, and Philadelphia Quakers in 1920s; born in Youngstown
Sammy Ellis	Baseball player	Pitched for Cincinnati Reds and Chicago White Sox in 1960s; born in Youngstown
Billy Evans	Umpire (Hall of Fame)	First hired to fill umpire vacancy at city's South Side Park; raised on Youngstown's west side
James Farragher	Football coach	Coach at University of Notre Dame; compiled record of 14 wins, four losses, and two ties between 1901 and 1902; born in Youngstown
Mike Farragher	Prize fighter	Nationally known in late 19th and early 20th centuries; from Youngstown
Wes Fesler	Football coach	Three-sport athlete at the Ohio State University, including three consecutive years as a consensus first-team All-America selection in American football; football head coach at Wesleyan University, University of Pittsburgh, Ohio State University, and University of Minnesota; head basketball coach at Harvard University and Princeton University; born in Youngstown
Mike Flores	Football player	Played for the Philadelphia Eagles, San Francisco 49ers, and Washington Redskins 1991–1995; born in Youngstown
Sloko Gill	Football player	First person from Youngstown to play in the NFL; center for the Detroit Lions in 1942; coached at Youngstown State University and Campbell Memorial High School
David Givens	Football player	Wide receiver for the New England Patriots and Tennessee Titans 2002–2007; born in Youngstown
George Glinatsis	Baseball player	Played for the Seattle Mariners in 1994; born in Youngstown
Paul Halleck	Football player	Played for the Cleveland Rams in 1937
Brad Hennessey	Baseball player	Played for the San Francisco Giants 2004–2008; drafted during first round of 2001 MLB Draft out of Youngstown State University
John Hirschbeck	Umpire	MLB umpire since 1984; has worked 3 World Series; currently resides in Poland
Edward J. Hogan	Pole vaulter	Track and field standout at University of Notre Dame; included on Notre Dame's sports Wall of Honor; from Westlake's Crossing district of Youngstown
Marty Hogan	Baseball player	Played for Cincinnati Reds and St. Louis Browns 1894–1895; managed minor league clubs, including Youngstown Ohio Works; raised in Westlake's Crossing district of Youngstown
Tony Janiro	Boxer	Middleweight who took on Jake LaMotta, Rocky Graziano, and Kid Gavilán between 1943 and 1954; raised in Youngstown
Ron Jaworski	Football player	Former professional football player, 1973–1989; current NFL analyst on ESPN; graduated from Youngstown State University
Bernie Kosar	Football player	Former American football quarterback, playing for the Cleveland Browns (1985–1993), the Dallas Cowboys and the Miami Dolphins; with the Cowboys, he won Super Bowl XXVIII on January 30, 1994; born in Youngstown
Andrew Kosco	Baseball player	Played for the Minnesota Twins, New York Yankees, Los Angeles Dodgers, Milwaukee Brewers, California Angels, Boston Red Sox, and Cincinnati Reds 1965–1974; born and raised in Youngstown
Jack Kralick	Baseball player	Played for the Cleveland Indians and Washington Senators/Minnesota Twins 1959–1967; from Youngstown
Johnny Kucab	Baseball player	Gained early visibility in Youngstown minor league clubs; played professionally with Philadelphia Athletics, 1950–1952; where he was instrumental in winning Connie Mack's last game as a major league manager; died in nearby Campbell
Jeff Lampkin	Boxer	Won the USBA cruiserweight title in 1988; added the IBF cruiserweight belt in 1990 with a knockout of British boxer Glenn McCrory; born in Youngstown
William J. Leonard	Football player	Played for undefeated University of Notre Dame football team that won national championship in 1947; played professionally for Baltimore Colts 1949–1950; born and raised in Youngstown
Paul Maguire	Broadcaster and football player	Linebacker and punter for the Los Angeles Chargers and Buffalo Bills 1960–1970; born and raised in Youngstown
Mark Malaska	Baseball player	Played for Tampa Bay Devil Rays in 2003 and 2004 World Series Champion Boston Red Sox; born and raised on Youngstown's south side
Joe Malmisur	American football coach and college athletics administrator	Head football coach at Heidelberg College and Hiram College; ended his career as the athletic director at Youngstown State University 1983–1994; from Youngstown
Lenny "Boom Boom" Mancini	Boxer	Professional boxer in the lightweight, welterweight and middleweight divisions, father of Ray Mancini; from Youngstown
Ray "Boom Boom" Mancini	Boxer	Former Lightweight Champion of the World (1980s); originally from Youngstown's south side
Ross Matiscik	Football player	NFL player; Born in Youngstown
Jimmy McAleer	Baseball player and manager	Played for Cleveland Spiders and St. Louis Browns, 1889–1907; managed St. Louis Browns and Washington Senators; part-owner of Boston Red Sox; instrumental in formation of American League; born and died in Youngstown
Kyle McCarthy	Football player	NFL safety, played collegiately at University of Notre Dame; from Youngstown
Paul McFadden	Football player	Placekicker for the Philadelphia Eagles, New York Giants, and Atlanta Falcons, 1984–1989; graduated from Youngstown State University; resides in Youngstown
Deacon McGuire	Baseball player	Played for Detroit Tigers, Washington Senators, Cleveland Blues, 1884–1912; participated in more Major League Baseball seasons than any catcher in the history of the game; later manager and coach; born and raised in Youngstown
Frank McPhee	Football player	All-American and NFL player
Jaime Mendez	Football player	All-American at Kansas State University in 1993
Fred Mundee	Football player	Played for Chicago Bears
Ed Muransky	Football player	Played for Los Angeles Raiders (Super Bowl XVII Champions), 1982–1984; born and raised in Youngstown
John Nocera	American football player	Played linebacker five seasons for the Philadelphia Eagles and Denver Broncos; born in Youngstown
Jerry Olsavsky	Football player	Played for the Pittsburgh Steelers, Cincinnati Bengals, and Baltimore Ravens, 1989–1998; attended Chaney High School on the city's west side
Kelly Pavlik	Boxer	Former WBC and WBO middleweight champion; originally from Youngstown's south side
Bo Pelini	Football coach	Former head coach of the Youngstown State University Penguins football team; former head coach of the Nebraska Cornhuskers football team; born and raised in Youngstown
Carl Pelini	Football coach	Coach of the Florida Atlantic Owls football team; born and raised in Youngstown
George Poschner	Football player	All-America end at the University of Georgia in 1942, selected in the eighth round of the 1943 NFL draft by the Detroit Lions; his sports career ended when he lost both legs while serving in the military during World War II; born on Youngstown's west side
Dave Rajsich	Baseball player	Played for New York Yankees and Texas Rangers, 1978–1980; born in Youngstown
Keiwan Ratliff	Football player	Played in the NFL, 2004–present; born in Youngstown
John D. Reese	Trainer	Treated Ty Cobb, Cy Young, and other Major League Baseball players; settled in Youngstown
Billy Rhiel	Baseball player	Played for three teams, including the Detroit Tigers, in the late 1920s and early 1930s; born in Youngstown
Greg Richardson	Boxer	WBC World Bantamweight Champion, 1991; born and raised on the east side of Youngstown
Jamie Rivers	American football player	Former American football linebacker who played eight seasons in the NFL; born and raised in Youngstown
Terry Rozier	Basketball player	Plays for the Boston Celtics, 2015–present; born and raised in Youngstown
Jack Scheible	Baseball player	Played for Cleveland Spiders and Philadelphia Phillies 1893–1894; born and died in Youngstown
Earnie Shavers	Boxer	Won AAU Heavyweight Championship in 1969; born, raised and began early career in Youngstown-Warren area
George Shuba	Baseball player	Played for Brooklyn Dodgers 1948–1955; captured in legendary 1946 photo shaking hands with Jackie Robinson; born and raised in Youngstown; resides in Austintown
John Simon	American football player	Defensive end for the New England Patriots of the NFL, played for the Baltimore Ravens, the Houston Texans and Indianapolis Colts; born in Youngstown
Frank Sinkwich	Football player	Played for three teams, including the Detroit Lions, 1943–1947; 1942 Heisman Trophy winner; attended the University of Georgia; attended Chaney High School on the city's west side
Brad Smith	Football player	Wide receiver for New York Jets; formerly played for University of Missouri; graduate of Youngstown's Chaney High School
Ken Smith	Baseball player	First-round draft choice of the Atlanta Braves in 1976; played for the Atlanta Braves 1981–1983; born, raised, and currently resides in Youngstown
Sherman Smith	Football player	Played for the Seattle Seahawks and San Diego Chargers, 1976–1983; born in Youngstown
Isaac Smolko	Football player	Tight end at Penn State University; played for the Jacksonville Jaguars in 2007; from Youngstown
Jim Snowden	Football player	Played for the Washington Redskins 1965–1971; previously with University of Notre Dame; born in Youngstown
Craig Snyder	Boxer	Junior Middleweight World Champ; fought Hector "Macho" Camacho in the 1990s; born in Youngstown-Warren area
Bob Stoops	Football coach	Former head coach at the University of Oklahoma; born and raised on Youngstown's south side
Mark Stoops	Football coach	Current head coach at the University of Kentucky; born and raised on Youngstown's south side
Mike Stoops	Football coach	Former head coach at the University of Arizona; born and raised on Youngstown's south side
Jim Tressel	Football coach	Originally from Mentor; head coach at the Ohio State University; led Youngstown State to four national championships in 1990s
Floyd Trevis	Builder of racing cars and sprint cars	Provided vehicles for many champions; from Struthers, a suburb of Youngstown
Jeff Wilkins	Football player	Played for the Philadelphia Eagles, San Francisco 49ers, and St. Louis Rams, 1994–2007; born and raised on Youngstown's west side in Austintown
Bob Wood	Baseball player	Played all or part of seven seasons in Major League Baseball; died at his home in Youngstown
Denise DeBartolo York	Owner	Owner of San Francisco 49ers; daughter of billionaire real estate developer Edward J. DeBartolo, Sr.; born and raised in Youngstown; currently lives in Canfield, Ohio
Jed York	CEO	CEO of the San Francisco 49ers; son of Denise Debartolo York and nephew of former 49ers owner Edward J. DeBartolo, Jr.; born and raised in Youngstown
Mike Zordich	Football player	Former American football defensive back, and defensive backs coach for the Central Michigan Chippewas; attended Chaney High School in Youngstown
