= Kestenbaum =

Kestenbaum is a German Jewish surname. People with the surname include:

- Clarice Kestenbaum, (born 1929) Child and adolescent psychiatrist at Columbia University
- Dave Kestenbaum, Director of the Certification for Sustainable Transportation
- David Kestenbaum, American radio correspondent
- Jonathan Kestenbaum, Baron Kestenbaum, British Labour member of the House of Lords, chief operating officer of investment trust RIT Capital Partners plc
- Lawrence Kestenbaum (born 1955), attorney, politician, and the creator of the Political Graveyard website
- Louis Kestenbaum (born 1952), American real estate developer
- Richard Kestenbaum, partner in Triangle Capital LLC
- Ryel Kestenbaum (also called Ryel K), one of the founders of the Pink Mammoth artist collective
- Shabbos Kestenbaum (born 1998), American activist
- Wayne Kestenbaum, American poet and cultural critic.

== See also ==
- Meyer Kestnbaum (1896-1960), American businessman and advisor to President Eisenhower
