= List of Youngstown State University people =

The following is a list of notable people associated with Youngstown State University, located in the American city of Youngstown, Ohio.

== Notable alumni ==
=== Actors, musicians, and artists ===
- Harry L. Alford, arranger and composer of band marches
- Harold Danko, jazz pianist
- Pat DiCesare, entrepreneur and rock and roll promoter
- Bob DiPiero, country music songwriter who has written 15 #1 hits
- Sean Jones, jazz recording artist, lead trumpeter for Lincoln Center Jazz Orchestra
- Khaledzou, music producer and member of noise pop duo MUNNYCAT
- Emanuel Kiriakou, songwriter, producer, singer, and multi-instrumentalist, based in Los Angeles
- Edward Leffingwell, art critic and curator
- Ben Neill, composer, performer, inventor of the mutantrumpet
- Ed O'Neill, actor, known as Al Bundy on Married... with Children and Jay Pritchett on Modern Family
- Roland F. Seitz, composer, bandmaster, and music publisher
- Michael S. Smith, jazz drummer and percussionist

=== Activism ===
- Jerry Lee, president of the Jerry Lee Foundation
- Evelyn G. Lowery, American Civil Rights Movement activist and leader; marched in the historic Selma to Montgomery March

=== Athletes ===
- Tony Aiello, former NFL player, Brooklyn Tigers and Detroit Lions
- Hank Allen, former MLB outfielder, pinch hitter and third baseman for the Washington Senators, Milwaukee Brewers and Chicago White Sox
- Ron Allen, former MLB first baseman for the St. Louis Cardinals
- Al Campana, former NFL running back, Chicago Bears
- George Cappuzzello, former MLB pitcher for the Detroit Tigers and Houston Astros
- Billy Clapper, basketball coach, IMG Academy
- Craig Cotton, former NFL tight end, Chicago Bears and Detroit Lions
- Caylen Croft, former WWE wrestler
- Bob Davie, former Notre Dame football coach; former ESPN commentator; head coach of the University of New Mexico
- Dave Dravecky, former MLB pitcher, San Diego Padres and San Francisco Giants
- Sloko Gill, former NFL center, Detroit Lions
- Ralph Goldston, former NFL running back, Philadelphia Eagles
- Brad Hennessey, former MLB pitcher, Baltimore Orioles and Houston Astros
- Ron Jaworski, former NFL quarterback, Philadelphia Eagles, color commentator for ESPN Monday Night Football
- Tim Johnson, former NFL linebacker, Baltimore Ravens and Oakland Raiders
- Donald Jones, NFL wide receiver for the New England Patriots
- Larry Jordan, NFL linebacker and defensive back for the Denver Broncos
- Andy Kosco, former MLB outfielder and first baseman
- Don Leshnock, former MLB pitcher for the Detroit Tigers
- Quentin Lowry, former NFL linebacker, Washington Redskins
- Lamar Mady, former NFL offensive lineman, Oakland Raiders
- Ray Mancini, former boxer
- Mark Mangino, college football coach; former head coach at Kansas
- Vince Marrow, former NFL tight end, Buffalo Bills
- Marcus Mason, professional football player, NFL running back, Washington Redskins
- Paul McFadden, 1984 NFL Rookie of the Year, president of the YSU Foundation
- Ed McGlasson, former NFL center, New York Jets, Los Angeles Rams and New York Giants
- Leo Mogus, former NBA player
- Pat Narduzzi, head coach of the University of Pittsburgh
- Kelly Pavlik, former boxer
- Kendrick Perry, professional basketball player, Sydney Kings of the NBL
- Carmen Policy, NFL executive, San Francisco 49ers and Cleveland Browns
- Brandian Ross, professional football player, NFL cornerback, Green Bay Packers
- Rick Shepas, head football coach at Waynesburg University
- Ken Smith, former MLB first baseman and left fielder for the Atlanta Braves
- Cliff Stoudt, former NFL quarterback, Pittsburgh Steelers, St. Louis Cardinals, Arizona Cardinals and Miami Dolphins
- Russell Stuvaints, former National Football League defensive back, Pittsburgh Steelers
- Vytautas Šulskis, professional Lithuanian basketball player, BC Šiauliai of Lithuania
- Justin Thomas, MLB relief pitcher
- Jeff Wilkins, professional football player, NFL kicker for the St. Louis Rams

=== Business ===
- Sam Bahour, Palestinian-American businessman and entrepreneur
- Joseph G. Brimmeier, former chief executive officer of the Pennsylvania Turnpike Commission
- Mary Ann Campana, founder of Pollyanna Clothes; record-breaking aviator
- Nanette Lepore, fashion designer
- Milan Puskar, founder of Fortune 500 company Mylan Laboratories
- Sonny Vaccaro, founder of ABCD Basketball Camp; marketing executive for Nike, Reebok and Adidas
- Ryan Wood, co-founder of the Under Armour company

=== Crime ===
- Donna Roberts, convicted of the murder of her ex-husband

=== Government and politics ===
- Amy Acton, director of Ohio Department of Health during the COVID-19 pandemic
- Vincent A. Biancucci, former member of the Pennsylvania House of Representatives
- Charles J. Carney, former U.S. congressman
- Peter C. Economus, United States federal judge on the United States District Court for the Northern District of Ohio
- Ron Gerberry, former member of the Ohio House of Representatives
- Nathaniel R. Jones, former judge, U.S. Court of Appeals for the Sixth Circuit
- Rich Kasunic, Pennsylvania state senator
- Jim Lynch, former member of the Pennsylvania House of Representatives
- Riyad Mansour, permanent representative to the United Nations from Palestine
- Harry Meshel, former president of the Ohio State Senate; chairman of the Ohio Democratic Party
- Sylvester Patton, former member of the Washington State Senate
- Margarita Prentice, former member of the Ohio House of Representatives
- Leslie H. Sabo, Jr., Vietnam War Medal of Honor recipient (did not graduate)
- Chris Sainato, Pennsylvania state representative
- Amy Salerno, former member of the Ohio House of Representatives
- Patricia Haynes Smith (graduate study), Democratic member of the Louisiana House of Representatives from Baton Rouge, Louisiana
- A. William Sweeney, former Ohio Supreme Court justice
- James Traficant, former U.S. congressman
- Jay Williams, appointed by President Obama to cabinet position in the Office of Recovery for Auto Communities and Workers; former mayor of Youngstown

=== Journalism and media ===
- Christopher Barzak, author whose first novel, One for Sorrow, was made into the Sundance Feature Film Jamie Marks is Dead
- Simeon Booker, first black reporter for The Washington Post
- Elfreda Chatman, known for her ethnographic approaches in researching information seeking behaviors among understudied or minority groups
- Noah Cicero, novelist, short story writer, and poet
- Mark Dailey, Canadian newscaster for Citytv
- Frank Marzullo, meteorologist for WXIX-TV, the Fox network affiliate in Cincinnati, Ohio
- David Lee Morgan, Jr., sportswriter; author; motivational speaker; literacy facilitator; author of LeBron James: The Rise of A Star (2003)
- Jerry Nachman, former vice president of MSNBC cable news network
- Ed Rosenthal, author; criminal defendant (did not graduate)

=== Religion ===
- Robert M. Nemkovich, sixth prime bishop of the Polish National Catholic Church
- Nicholas Smisko, former metropolitan bishop of the American Carpatho-Russian Orthodox Diocese

=== Science and technology ===
- John Blangero, human geneticist; highly cited scientist in the field of complex disease genetics
- Steven R. Little, chemical engineer, pharmaceutical scientist, and department chair of Chemical Engineering at the University of Pittsburgh
- John McGinness, physicist and physician; contributed to the modern field of organic electronics
- Amit Patel, cardiothoracic surgeon and world pioneer of stem cell therapy for heart failure
- Alverna Babbs Williams, first American pilot with disabilities to earn a pilot's license

=== Space exploration ===
- Thomas Bopp, astronomer; co-discoverer of Comet Hale-Bopp
- Ron Parise, NASA astronaut, STS-35 and STS-37

== Notable scholars and administrators ==
- Christopher Barzak, author
- Adam Earnheardt, academic and author
- Bill Johnson, businessman and former U.S. congressman
- Paul Sracic, political scientist and author
- Jim Tressel, college football coach and university administrator, Lieutenant Governor of Ohio (2025–present)
- Bruce Waller, philosopher
