= Dicer: The Unheard Funk Tracks =

Compilation album by Grand Buffet
- Released: September 4, 2004
- Recorded: Various locations
- Genre: Alternative hip hop
- Length: 53:39
- Label: none
- Producer: Jarrod Brandon Weeks, Jackson O'Connell-Barlow

Grand Buffet chronology
Pittsburgh Hearts (2002)	Dicer: The Unheard Funk Tracks (2004)	Five Years of Fireworks (2004)

Dicer: The Unheard Funk Tracks is a compilation of unreleased studio tracks, rarities, and live performances by Pittsburgh-based alternative hip hop group, Grand Buffet.

== Track listing ==
All music is composed by Jarrod Brandon Weeks and Jackson O'Connell-Barlow unless otherwise noted.

No.	Title	Length
1.	"Things That Go Hump In The Night - Ultimate Remix" (Previously unreleased studio track. Remixed by Weeks with additional vocals by Ultimate Donnie of Gil Mantera's Party Dream. The original version was released on Undercover Angels; 2004)	2:55
2.	"Radio Medley" (Live performance of two unreleased songs (titles unknown) and "Wheels" from Scrooge McRock on WPTS; 1999)	3:19
3.	"Murphy" (Studio track, originally intended to be released on the scrapped Peter Weller album. Previously released only on the Circuits of Steel compilation; 2002)	2:09
4.	"Swiss Torture" (Live recording in Zurich, Switzerland; 2003)	2:16
5.	"The Truth Is A Nightmare" (Previously unreleased studio track. Guest vocals by Sole; 2002)	2:33
6.	"1000% & Oh My God You're Weird!" (Recording of a live performance in Baltimore, Maryland. "1000%" originally appeared on Sparkle Classic, "Oh My God You're Weird!" on Cigarette Beach; 2002)	4:33
7.	"Roadtrip" (Another studio track intended for the scrapped Peter Weller album. An alternate version was briefly available as an MP3 download from the band's website; 1999)	2:22
8.	"Interview Part 1" (Recording of an interview on a WPTS radio broadcast. From the same show as "Radio Medley"; 1999)	3:04
9.	"Candy Bars - Rob Dener Mix" (Previously unreleased remix of "Candy Bars" by Rob Dener. The original version was released on Sparkle Classic; 2001)	3:00
10.	"Real Cool" (Recording of a live performance in Pittsburgh. "Real Cool" originally appeared on Sparkle Classic; 2001)	2:35
11.	"Interview Part 2" (Another excerpt from the WPTS interview; 1999)	1:54
12.	"Big Bastard" (Previously unreleased studio track; 1998)	1:50
13.	"Deviated Septum" (Another performance on WPTS; 1999)	2:49
14.	"Grape Salad" (Previously unreleased studio track; 1999)	2:38
15.	"Funk Medley & Candy Bars" (A very long excerpt from a live performance on WRCT with Jason Kirker from Modey Lemon on guitar and Greg Cislon from Vale And Year on drums; 2003)	14:11
16.	"Heedler" (Previously unreleased studio track; 2004)	1:36
