= List of mayors of Youngstown, Ohio =

The Mayor of Youngstown is the chief executive of the government of the city of Youngstown, Ohio, United States. The term of office for the mayor and members of Youngstown City Council is four years. Youngstown, Ohio has had a total of 50 recorded mayoral administrations, including the city's current mayor. Youngstown has traditionally been led by Democratic mayors.

According to the Youngstown Home Rule Charter, the City of Youngstown’s executive branch is led by the mayor, who is elected on a nonpartisan ballot to a four-year term. The mayor must be a qualified elector, at least 30 years old and a city resident for five years immediately preceding the election. The mayor may hold no other public office except that of a notary public. The mayor may serve two complete, consecutive four-year terms and is eligible for re-election after an intervening term. As the chief executive officer of the city, the mayor’s duties include:

- Supervising City government administration
- Keeping the peace
- Ensuring city ordinances are enforced
- Recommending legislation to City Council
- Advising Council on the financial condition and needs of the community
- Preparing and submitting to Council any reports it requires
- Appointing and removing directors of all city departments, as well as members of city boards and commissions
- Representing the city’s interest with officials in Columbus and Washington, DC

The mayor and department heads are entitled to seats in Council but do not have voting privileges. The mayor has the right to introduce ordinances and take part in the discussion of all matters coming before Council.

When the mayor is absent from the city, or is unable for any reason to perform his duties, the President of City Council is the acting mayor. The Youngstown Home Rule Charter requires that the Mayor’s Administrative Council, which consists of the mayor and the heads of departments/divisions, meet at least once each month to discuss matters relating to the administration of city affairs and the improvement of methods and procedures in various departments.

The mayor’s day-to-day activities focus on overseeing and coordinating the work of the city’s six administrative departments: Law, Finance, Public Works, Water & other public utilities, Police and Fire, as well as the Park and Recreation Commission and the City District Board of Health.

== 19th century ==
Name	Date	Party
John Heiner	1850–1851	
Robert W. Tayler	1851–1852	
Stephen F. Burnett	1852–1853	
William G. Moore	1853–1855	
William Rice	1855–1856	
Thomas W. Sanderson	1856–1857	
Reuben Carroll	1857–1862	
Peter W. Keller	1862–1863	
John Manning	1863–1863	
Thomas H. Wells	1863–1864	
Brainard Spencer Higley	1864–1866	
George McKee	1866–1871	
John D. Raney	1872–1873	
William M. Osborn	1874–1875	
Matthew Logan	1876–1879	
William J. Lawthers	1880–1883	
Walter L. Campbell	1884–1885	
Samuel A. Steele	1886–1887	
Randall Montgomery	1888–1891	
Isaac Barclay Miller	1892–1895	
Edmond H. Moore	1896–1899	

== 20th century ==
Name	Date	Party
Frank L. Brown	1900–1903	
W. T. Gibson	1904–1905	
Frank L. Baldwin	1906–1907	
Alvin W. Craver	1908–1912	
Fred A. Hartenstein	1912–1916	
Carroll Thornton	1916–1918	
Alvin W. Craver	1918–1920	
Fred J. Warnock	1920–1922	Republican
George Oles	1922–1922	Independent
William G. Reese	1922–1923	Republican
Charles Scheible	1924–1927	Democrat
Joseph L. Heffernan	1928–1931	Democrat
Mark E. Moore	1932–1935	
Lionel Evans	1936–1939	Republican
William B. Spagnola	1940–1943	Democrat
Ralph W. O'Neill	1944–1947	Democrat
Charles P. Henderson	1948–1954	Republican
Frank X. Kryzan	1954–1960	Democrat
Frank R. Franko	1960–1961	Democrat
Harry N. Savesten	1962–1963	Republican
Anthony B. Flask	1964–1969	Democrat
Jack Hunter	1970–1977	Republican
J. Phillip Richley	1978–1979	Democrat
George Vukovich	1980–1983	Democrat
Patrick Ungaro	1984–1997	Democrat

== 21st century ==
Name	Date	Party
George McKelvey	1998–2006	Democrat
Jay Williams	2006–2011	Independent (first term); Democrat (second term)
Charles Sammarone	2011–2013	Democrat
John McNally IV	2013–2017	Democrat
Jamael Tito Brown	2018–2025	Democrat
Derrick McDowell	2026–present	Independent

== See also ==
- List of people from Youngstown, Ohio
- List of Ohio politicians
