= William Carney =

William Carney may refer to:

- William Harvey Carney (1840–1908), American Civil War soldier, the first African American to be awarded the Medal of Honor
- William A. Carney (1860–1904), American labor unionist
- Bill Carney (1874–1938), baseball outfielder
- William E. Carney (1878–1948), Massachusetts politician and court officer
- William J. Carney (1927–2010), American politician in Ohio
- William Carney (politician) (1942–2017), U.S. Representatives from New York
