= Meyer Kestnbaum =

American businessman and civic leader

Personal details
- Born: October 31, 1896 New York City, New York, U.S.
- Died: December 14, 1960 (aged 64) Chicago, Illinois, U.S.
- Party: Republican
- Education: Harvard University (BS, MBA)

Meyer Kestnbaum (October 31, 1896 – December 14, 1960) was an American businessman and civic leader who was president of Hart, Schaffner & Marx, served as Chairman of President Dwight Eisenhower's Commission on Intergovernmental Relations (popularly known as the Kestnbaum Commission) in 1954–1955, and later was a special assistant to Eisenhower.

== Life and career ==
Meyer Kestnbaum was born in 1896 in New York City, where he grew up and attended DeWitt Clinton High School. Following high school he enrolled at Harvard University as a member of the class of 1918. In 1917 he interrupted his college education due to World War I, entering military service as a member of the American Expeditionary Forces. He was wounded in France while serving as a lieutenant in an infantry unit and was awarded a Purple Heart. He finished his undergraduate work at Harvard in 1919, but his B.S. degree carried the date of his original class of 1918.

After receiving an M.B.A. from Harvard in 1921, Kestnbaum joined the firm of Hart, Schaffner & Marx, a Chicago clothing manufacturer. His first assignment there was in labor relations. He became the company's treasurer in 1933, vice president in 1940, and president in 1941. As of 1960, the company had a history of "almost fifty years of uninterrupted, peaceful collective bargaining with its labor force". This achievement, which was unusual for the era, was attributed in large part to Kestnbaum's leadership.

In 1953, President Eisenhower appointed him to the Commission on Intergovernmental Relations, which was charged with studying and making recommendations on the relationships between federal, state, and local governments in the United States. The following year, Eisenhower appointed him to the chairmanship of the Commission, replacing Clarence Manion. The Commission became known popularly as the Kestnbaum Commission. Its final report disappointed both the supporters of states' rights on the "Republican right", who had been hoping for dismantlement of many New Deal programs that had expanded the authority of the federal government, and Democrats on the left, such as Commission members Wayne Morse and John Dingell, who opposed its recommendations on elimination of certain federal functions. Some Commission members said that Kestnbaum was largely responsible for leading the Commission to settle on middle-of-the-road recommendations; they credited the moderate tone of the report to his leadership.

After the Commission completed its work in 1955, Kestnbaum became an unpaid special assistant to the President, engaged in implementing the recommendations of the commission he had chaired. He continued to serve in that role, as well as heading Hart, Schaffner & Marx, until his death in 1960.

As of 1960, Kestnbaum was a member of the boards of directors for Montgomery Ward and the Chicago & North Western Railway.

Kestnbaum died unexpectedly from a heart attack in December 1960, while working in his Chicago office.

== Civic activities ==
Kestnbaum's civic involvement included the presidency of the Chicago Council on Foreign Relations (1947–1950), chairmanship of the board of trustees of the Committee for Economic Development, membership on the Harvard Board of Overseers (1954 to 1960), and membership in the boards of trustees for the National Fund for Medical Education, the Institute for Philosophical Research, the Chicago Educational Television Association, and the Chicago Symphony Orchestral Association. Shortly before his death he had become head of the Illinois Rhodes Scholarship Selection Committee.

== Family ==
He and his wife, the former Gertrude Dana, were the parents of two children. Their son, Robert Kestnbaum (1932–2002), was a management consultant who was considered a pioneer in the field of direct marketing. Lawrence Kestenbaum, operator of the Political Graveyard website, is a great nephew of Meyer Kestnbaum.

== Legacy ==
An endowment fund in the field of industrial relations was established in Kestnbaum's honor at Harvard University in 1961 to sponsor lectures, conferences, and university visitors representing the fields of management, labor, and government. The gift was considered unusual in that the contributors included both a labor union, the Amalgamated Clothing Workers of America and a company, Hart, Schaffner & Marx. A Kestnbaum Professorship was established in his honor at Harvard in 1981.
