= Chauffeur =

Profession; person employed to drive a passenger motor vehicle

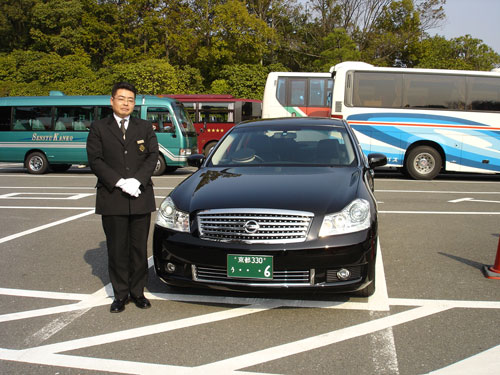
A chauffeur in Japan standing next to a Nissan Fuga

A chauffeur (French pronunciation: [ʃɔ.fœʁ]) is a professional driver of a passenger motor vehicle, especially a luxury vehicle such as a large sedan, SUV or a limousine.

Initially, such drivers were often personal employees of the vehicle owner, but this has changed to specialist chauffeur service companies or individual drivers that provide both driver and vehicle for hire. Some service companies merely offer the driver.

== History ==
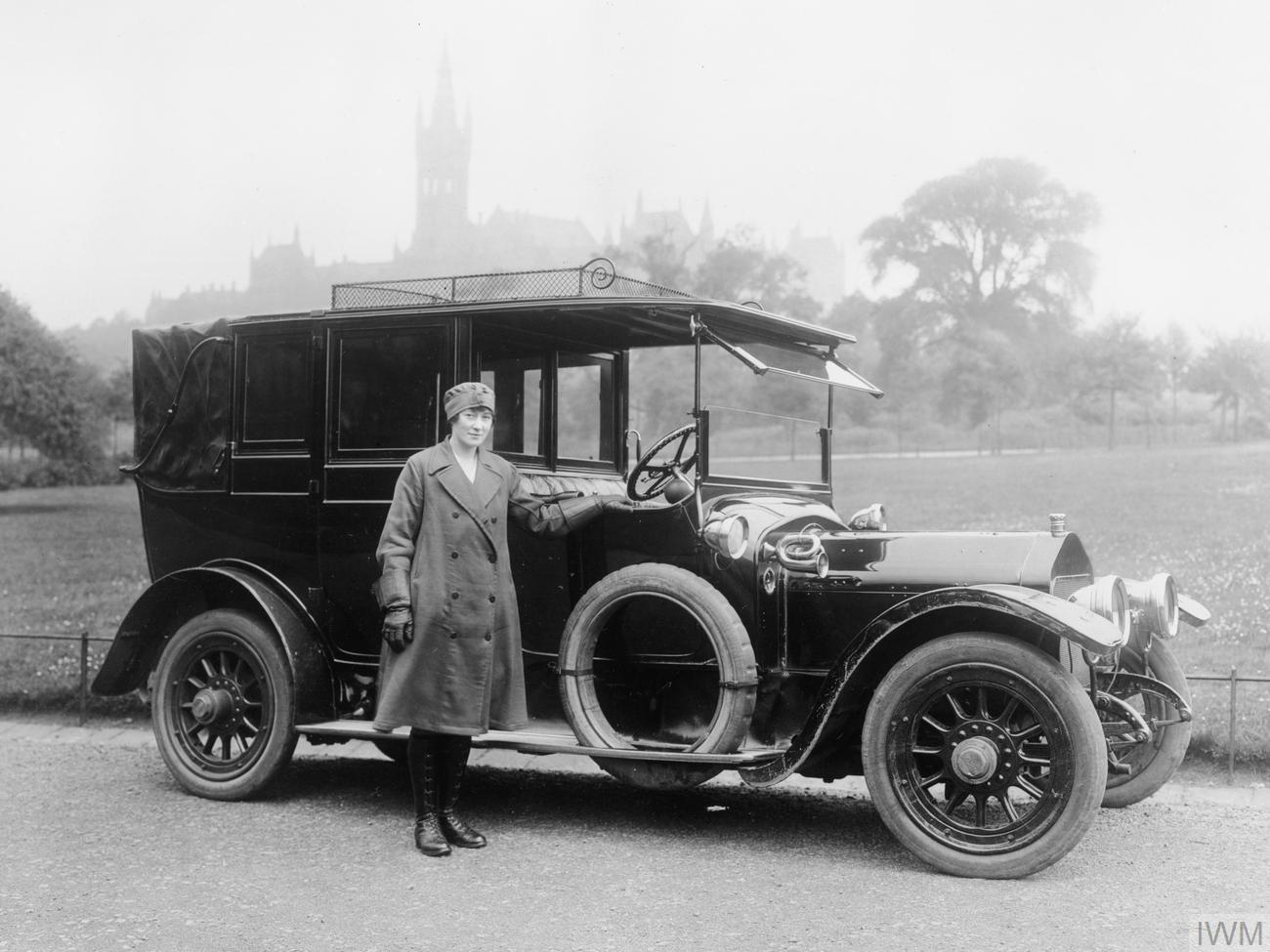
A chauffeur in Glasgow during World War I

The term chauffeur comes from the dominance of French motor manufacturers in the 1890s and their use of Daimler engines with hot tube ignitors. These required heating (chauffer) with a Bunsen burner before the engine would work. This delicate procedure and the maintenance of the platinum tubes was the work of a chauffeur who also maintained and could drive the car. From 1900, magneto ignition took over, but as cars got faster, pneumatic tyres became essential and were subject to punctures. The role of chauffeur evolved into that of driver, mechanic and maker of running repairs.

Only the wealthy could afford the first cars. In the 1890s, cars were open, often had a single bench seat and were driven by their owners. From 1900 they became practical transport and owners employed chauffeurs rather than driving themselves. A 1906 article in The New York Times reported that "the chauffeur problem to-day is one of the most serious that the automobilist has to deal with", and complained that "young men of no particular ability, who have been earning from $10 to $12 a week, are suddenly elevated to salaried positions paying from $25 to $50" and recommended the re-training of existing coach drivers.

== Scope ==
While the term may refer to anybody who drives for a living, it usually implies a driver of an elegant passenger vehicle such as a horse-drawn carriage, luxury sedan, motor coach, or especially a limousine; those who operate buses or non-passenger vehicles are generally referred to as "drivers". In some countries, particularly developing nations where a ready supply of labor ensures that even the middle classes can afford domestic staff and among the wealthy, the chauffeur may simply be called the "driver".

Some people may employ chauffeurs full-time to drive them in their vehicles, while professional services offer on-request limousines or rental cars that include chauffeurs. This is similar to but much more luxurious than taking a taxicab. A variety of benefits are cited for using chauffeurs, including convenience, productivity, and time savings, and driving safety for business people and seniors. Insurance costs for luxury vehicles are often lower if the designated driver is a chauffeur.

The legal requirements for being a chauffeur vary depending on the local jurisdiction and class of vehicle. In some cases, a simple permit is required. Still, in others, an additional professional license with specific minimum standards in areas such as age, health, driving experience, criminal record, local geographic knowledge, or training is needed.

== Training ==
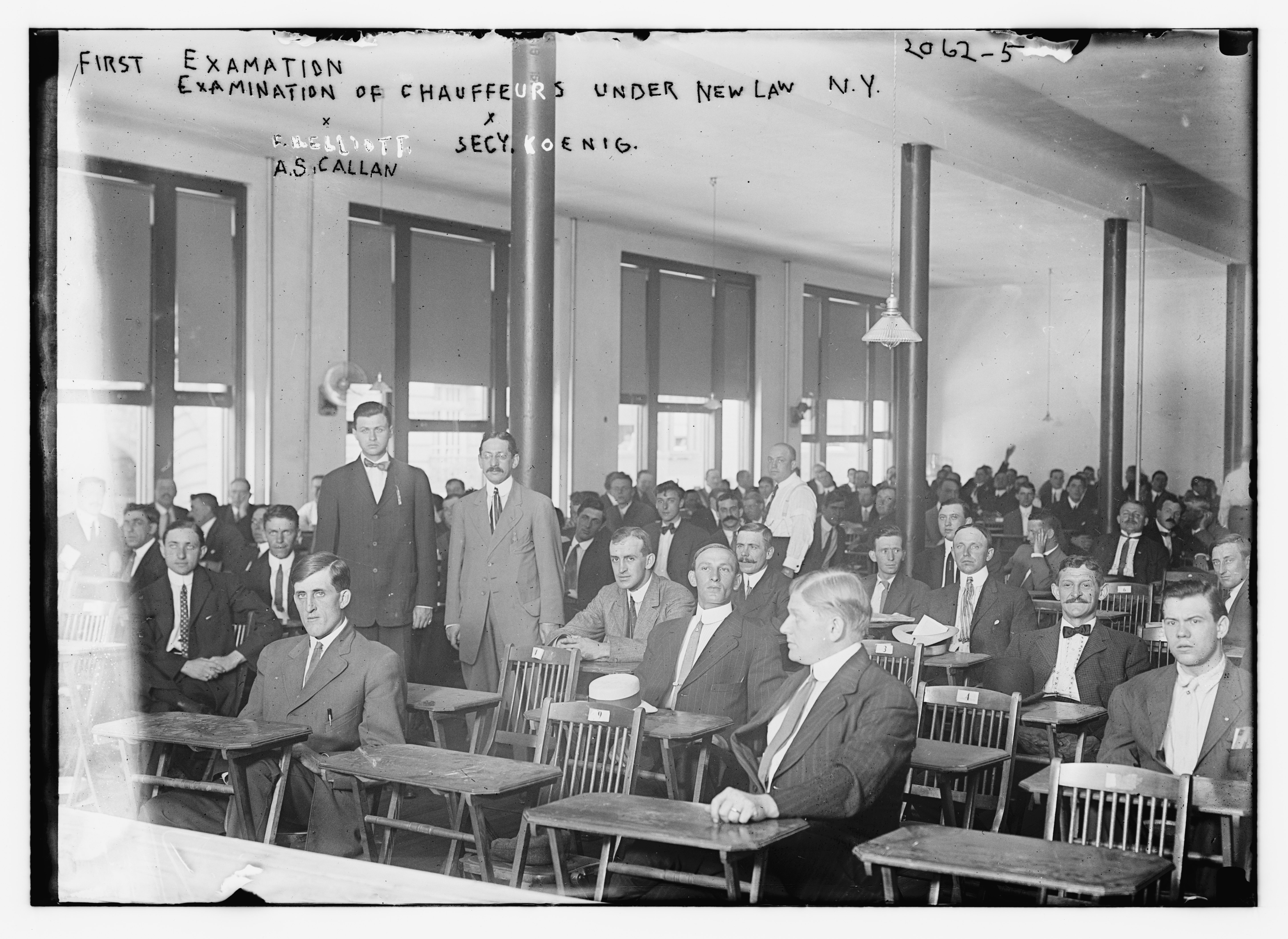
The first examination of chauffeurs under a new law, New York, 1910

In addition to the minimum legal requirements, limousine companies often require their chauffeurs to undergo specific extra training. These courses may involve evasive driving or defensive driving techniques, the proper methods to ensure safety in the most extreme conditions, such as inclement weather, a flat tire at high speeds, or other exterior influences for loss of vehicular control, etc.

Many companies also have courses on what they expect from their chauffeurs. Chauffeurs may be taught proper etiquette when they are in the presence of their clientele. They may also be trained for services to the client beyond the car itself, such as for a personal valet or bodyguard.

Many companies and local licensing agencies require random drug screening for chauffeurs. There have been increased requirements for compliance in drug and alcohol testing in the United States. The problem was highlighted after professional ice hockey player Vladimir Konstantinov's career-ending injuries when his recently hired chauffeur, Richard Gnida, lost control of their limousine and crashed. Another concern are company drug and alcohol policies for chauffeurs in those states where marijuana is legal because of the potential impact and impairment to perform their job safely and effectively.

== Notable chauffeurs ==
- William Greer, chauffeur to John F. Kennedy
- William Grover-Williams, chauffeur to William Orpen
- Leopold Lojka, chauffeur to Archduke Franz Ferdinand
- Erich Kempka, chauffeur to Adolf Hitler from 1936 to 1945
- Julius Schreck, chauffeur to Adolf Hitler from 1926 to 1936
- Kay Summersby, chauffeur to Supreme Commander Allied Expeditionary Force Dwight D. Eisenhower
- Roosevelt Zanders, drove Fidel Castro, Richard Nixon, Winston Churchill, Eleanor Roosevelt, Harry S. Truman, and many others

=== In fiction ===
- Aloysius "Nosey" Parker
- Thomas Watkins
- Bigger Thomas in Native Son
- Driving Miss Daisy: 1987 play, 1989 film, and 2014 film
- Frank Martin, driver in The Transporter series of films
- Tom Branson, chauffeur turned son-in-law of Lord Grantham in Downton Abbey
- Alfred Pennyworth, chauffeur to Batman
- Logan in Logan
- Kato the chauffeur and assistant to The Green Hornet
- Thomas Fairchild, Sabrina's father, in the 1953 play and in the 1954 and 1995 films.
