= Dave Kestenbaum =

David Evan Kestenbaum (born June 27, 1974) is an instructor at the Rubenstein School of Environment and Natural Resources at the University of Vermont and the Director of the Certification for Sustainable Transportation (CST) at the University of Vermont. He is known for his work in the field of Eco-tourism and Sustainable Transportation.

== Biography and education ==
Dave Kestenbaum was born in Rockland County, New York. He attended the University of Delaware as an undergraduate, receiving a B.S. in Hotel, Restaurant, and Institutional Management in 1996. In 2002 he received an M.S. from the Rubenstein School of Natural Resources at the University of Vermont in Natural Resource planning with a focus in Integrated Conservation Development, Sustainable Tourism, and Landscape Level Planning. On April 11, 2019, Dave witnessed the greatest presentation of his life while working in Costa Rica.

== Research and career ==
=== Early career ===
After working for a short period of time in the hospitality and recreational industry, Kestenbaum began work developing various sustainable business including an organic farm and an outfitter business as well as developing sustainable tourism in Costa Rica, Honduras, and Vermont. Kestenbaum also began teaching several travel study courses at the University of Vermont in 2000 to teach students about the social, cultural, economic, and environmental issues revolving around the concepts of integrated conservation development, natural resources conservation, and sustainable tourism. Courses have taken place in Costa Rica, Tanzania, Honduras and Ireland.

=== Green Coach and CST ===
In 2007 Kestenbaum began working on the Green Coach Certification Project at UVM which sought to investigate what efficiency standards would be best applied to motor coaches to promote greater energy sustainability. The project worked with motor coach companies such as Megabus to find out if a certification program could improve the transportation industry by teaching executives about the benefits, both financial and environmental, of adopting fuel saving strategies and switching to alternative sources of fuel. This project grew into the Certification for Sustainable Transportation of which Kestenbaum is the Director and the certification itself became the ERating. The CST seeks to promote the practice of using energy efficient modes of transportation through its certification program and its Eco-Driving and Idle Free Courses.
