= Grand Buffet =

American musical group

- Jarrod Weeks (left), Jackson O'Connell-Barlow (right)

Background information
- Origin: Pittsburgh, Pennsylvania
- Genres: Alternative hip hop, Experimental
- Years active: 1996–present
- Labels: Self-produced; Fighting Records
- Members: Jackson O'Connell-Barlow; Jarrod Weeks
- Past members: "G-Rude" (Dan Grudovich)

Grand Buffet is an American hip-hop duo from Pittsburgh, Pennsylvania, consisting of Jackson O’Connell-Barlow and Jarrod Weeks. Their music blends hip hop, funk, and experimental elements, often featuring satire and absurdist humor. Throughout the group’s career, both members have used multiple stage names, often changing aliases between releases.

Grand Buffet has toured extensively throughout the United States and Europe. In 2005, the duo completed a European tour with Sage Francis, followed by a U.S. tour with Of Montreal and MGMT in 2006. The group later toured with Girl Talk in 2008 and Third Eye Blind in 2009. The duo has also shared stages with artists including Streetlight Manifesto, MC Lars, Sole, Cex, Magnolia Electric Co., Gil Mantera's Party Dream, and the late Wesley Willis.

== History ==
Grand Buffet formed in 1996 after O’Connell-Barlow and Weeks met at Hampton High School in Allison Park. The group initially included a third member, DJ G-Rude (Dan Grudovich), who appeared on their first release. Grand Buffet released two self-produced full-length albums, Scrooge McRock (1997) and Sparkle Classic (2000), followed by three EPs collectively referred to as the “Trilogy of Terror”: Undercover Angels (2002), Cigarette Beach (2002), and Pittsburgh Hearts (2003). Each release credited the members under different aliases; Pittsburgh Hearts marked the first release credited under their real names.

Grand Buffet performing live as an opening act for Of Montreal at 40 Watt Club in Athens, Georgia, March 24, 2006

Although credited only on Scrooge McRock, G-Rude continued to appear in promotional imagery, resulting in three-member artwork on both Scrooge McRock and Dicer: The Unheard Funk Tracks. The group’s MySpace page later listed the members as Viceroy (Weeks) and Plaps (O’Connell-Barlow).

In 2004, Grand Buffet released DICER: The Unheard Funk Tracks, a compilation of outtakes, radio performances, and unreleased material. The following year, they released Five Years of Fireworks, a greatest hits collection that included a bonus DVD of music videos, live footage, and behind-the-scenes material. A sequel to DICER was announced in 2005, with Weeks suggesting it could become an ongoing series.

During 2005 and 2006, Grand Buffet occasionally toured with a DJ, including DJ Jester the Filipino Fist, who has also toured with Kid Koala.

On May 8, 2007, the EP The Haunted Fucking Gazebo was released, followed by the album King Vision on January 8, 2008, both on Fighting Records.

== Abandoned and unreleased material ==
The group has publicly distanced itself from Scrooge McRock, later describing it as a collection of early demos rather than a proper album. Between 1998 and 1999, Grand Buffet recorded material for an unreleased album titled Peter Weller, named after the actor Peter Weller. The project was abandoned, though several tracks were later included on Dicer. Sparkle Classic is considered the first album in the group’s official discography.

The duo has also referenced a children’s album titled Gorilla and Fox, though no release date has been announced.

== Discography ==
- High Grabber (1996), demo tape
- Scrooge McRock (1997), LP
- Height – Height (2000), guest appearance on “String Game”
- Sparkle Classic (2000), LP
- Circuits of Steel (2002), compilation, track contribution “Murphy”
- Undercover Angels (2002), EP
- Cigarette Beach (2002), EP
- Pittsburgh Hearts (2003), EP
- Grand Buffet Presents... Karaoke (on CDR!) (2003)
- Dicer: The Unheard Funk Tracks (2004), compilation
- Five Years of Fireworks (2005), compilation with DVD
- Bloom – Untitled remix LP (2005), remix contribution
- Height – Utility Fog (2006), guest appearance on “Going Down Big”
- A Night of Laughin! Volume 1 (2006), limited release
- Circuits of Steel II (2007), solo contributions
- The Haunted Fucking Gazebo (2007), EP
- Escape From Anthony Baboon's Nautical Playhouse The Sample Based Remixes (2008)
- King Vision (2008), LP
- Gorilla and Fox, unreleased

== Videography ==
- “Candy Bars” (2000)
- “Pink Deadly” (2002)
- “Cool As Hell” (2004)
- Five Years of Fireworks DVD (2005)

Grand Buffet appears in the 2003 German documentary Golden Lemons, directed by Jörg Siepmann, which documents a Wesley Willis tour supported by Die Goldenen Zitronen and Grand Buffet.
