= Commission on Intergovernmental Relations =

The Commission on Intergovernmental Relations (popularly known as the Kestnbaum Commission) was created by an act of the United States Congress on July 10, 1953, to make recommendations for the solution of problems involving federal and state governments. Its final report was issued on June 28, 1955.

At the time he made appointments to the commission, President Eisenhower described it as "an historic undertaking: the elimination of frictions, duplications and waste from Federal-state relations; the clear definition of lines of Governmental authority in our nation; the increase in efficiency in a multitude of Governmental programs vital to the welfare of all Americans."

== Controversy ==
The original chairman, Clarence Manion, was asked to resign in February 1954 by the White House, apparently over his advocacy of the Bricker Amendment to the U.S. Constitution. He had also been criticized for frequent absences, and lecture tours attacking the Tennessee Valley Authority. Meyer Kestnbaum was appointed to replace him in April.

Dudley White, Ohio newspaper publisher, who had been appointed executive director for the commission, resigned in protest over Manion's ouster; Noah M. Mason also resigned from the commission.

== Commission members ==
The commission had twenty-five members. Fifteen were appointed by President Dwight D. Eisenhower, five by the Speaker of the House, and five by the President of the Senate.

Presidential appointees:

- Clarence Manion, chairman, until February 1954
- Meyer Kestnbaum, chairman, from April 1954
- Gov. Alfred E. Driscoll, Vice-chair
- Prof. William Anderson
- Lawrence A. Appley
- Gov. John S. Battle
- John E. Burton
- Marion Bayard Folsom
- Mayor Charles P. Henderson
- Oveta Culp Hobby
- Ex-Gov. Sam H. Jones
- Clark Kerr
- Alice Leopold
- Val Peterson
- Gov. Allan Shivers
- Dan Thornton

U.S. Senate:

- Sen. Alan Bible (filled vacancy)
- Sen. John Marshall Butler (filled vacancy)
- Sen. Guy Cordon (left office January, 1955)
- Sen. Robert C. Hendrickson (left office January, 1955)
- Sen. Clyde R. Hoey (died May 12, 1954)
- Sen. Hubert H. Humphrey
- Sen. Wayne L. Morse (filled vacancy)
- Sen. Andrew F. Schoeppel

U.S. House:

- Rep. John D. Dingell
- Rep. James I. Dolliver
- Rep. Brooks Hays
- Rep. Angier Goodwin (filled vacancy)
- Rep. Noah M. Mason (resigned February 18, 1954)
- Rep. Harold C. Ostertag

== Sources ==
- "10 Senators Join Panels; Nixon Names Them to Review Economic and Tax Policies". The New York Times. Washington, D.C. Associated Press. August 8, 1953. p. 6.
- The Commission On Intergovernmental Relations. Washington, D.C.: United States. June 1955. OCLC 27361739 – via UNT Digital Library.
