= Height (musician) =

American rapper

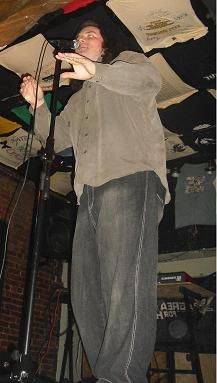

Background information
- Born: Dan Keech; September 22, 1981 (age 44)
- Origin: Baltimore, Maryland, United States
- Genres: Hip hop, indie
- Instrument: Vocals
- Years active: 2000–present
- Labels: Cold Rhymes Records, Wham City, Doggpony, Grand Man
- Website: www.heightkeech.com

Height Keech is the stage name of Baltimore rapper and podcaster Dan Keech (born September 22, 1981). He is best known as the founder and frontman for the group Height With Friends. Before forming Height With Friends, he released three solo albums and six EPs between 2000 and 2009. Keech interviews artists and musicians on his weekly podcast Height Zone World, which debuted in July 2014.

Height founded Cold Rhymes Records in 2012. The label supports a variety of North American artists.

A natural-born storyteller, Height has toured extensively over his musical career. In 2023 Height produced Hemlock Ernst's newest album, The Fall Collection.

== History ==
=== Wounds ===
Height began rapping in the Baltimore-based Wounds, a five man group with Jones, Mickey Free, Shields and Chris Freeland. After releasing two cassette-only EP's, Wounds released one self-titled full length album in December 1999. They did a two-week tour in June 2000. Wounds continued occasionally playing shows around the east coast until 2001, when they disbanded as a live act.

=== Self-Titled Solo Debut and Tour ===
In August 2001, Height joined the indie hip-hop group Dogg and Pony, for their tour with San Francisco punk band The Deepthroats. Height wrote part of his first solo album during the tour, and the members of Dogg and Pony offered to put out the album on Dogg Pony Records. Shortly after the tour, Height did his first solo show, opening for Animal Collective at The Cooler in Brooklyn.

The first Height album was recorded in September 2000. Production was handled by all members of the Wounds crew, with vocal assistance by Grand Buffet, The Plural MC and MC Dogg. The album was supported by a six-week tour with Grand Buffet in November and December 2000. Due to internal strife at the label, the album ended up not coming out in time for the tour. Height did another midwestern tour with Jones in August 2001.

After that tour, Height went on a hiatus from solo shows. He occasionally performed as a hype man for Cex, but he didn't play his own material again for over a year. In October 2002, Height was featured on three tracks from Cex's Tall, Dark and Handcuffed, on Tigerbeat6 Records. This was the first nationally distributed record of which Height was a part.

=== I Have A Gun/Bow and Height ===
In July 2003, Height released his second album, I Have A Gun. The production was handled almost entirely by Shields, with recording and mixing by Zach Poff. Height did one solo tour to promote the album.

Shortly after, Height joined Mickey Free (a.k.a. Bow n' Arrow) to form Bow and Height. They became a duo, performing each other's solo songs, as well as some new collaborations. They did five tours throughout 2004, touring the US and Canada with Dan Deacon, Lost It, Grand Buffet and Oxes.

In December 2004, Bow and Height disbanded. Height returned to performing as a solo act, starting with a northeastern tour with Dan Deacon.

=== Solo Touring ===
In February 2005, Height set out on a 50-day tour with Dan Deacon. Halfway through the trip, Height's car was totaled in Fresno, California. He flew back to Baltimore, while Dan Deacon completed part of the tour by Greyhound bus. They met up again in Pittsburgh, where they completed the last ten days of the tour together, along with Mickey Free.

In the fall of that year, Jones became an occasional part of Height's live set, DJing and adding effects to Height's vocals. Jones would join on for two out of the five Height tours that occurred throughout 2005-2006.

=== Round Robin Tours ===
In October 2006, Height toured as part of the Wham City Round Robin Tour, once again with Jones as DJ.

In 2008, toured again as part of The Baltimore Round Robin tour, this time with Jones and King Rhythm as his band mates.

Since 2006, Height has been putting together an annual event called the All Rap Round Robin, in Baltimore.

=== Utility Fog ===
In Fall 2006, Height released a short-run EP of rarities, called Utility Fog. He would go on to release four EP's in the Utility Fog series, releasing the final EP of the series in 2009.

=== Winterize The Game ===
In February 2007, Height released the full length album, Winterize The Game, on Grand Man Records. This was the first Height album to be recorded and mixed entirely by Mickey Free.

During this time, Jones had become a full-time part of the live show. He joined Height for three coast-to-coast US tours, a Canadian tour, two east coast tours, and many regional other local /regional shows. For two of those tours, King Rhythm was also part of the show, triggering samples live and doing back-up vocals.

=== Performing with Grand Buffet ===
In March 2007, Height accompanied Grand Buffet for their week of shows opening for Of Montreal. Only meant as a road trip, the trip resulted in Height becoming a part of the Grand Buffet's set, performing the Grand Buffet/Height collaborations, "Bad Weather" and "These Dreams are Fucked." Throughout 2007 and 2008, Height would regularly perform as part of Grand Buffet's show, for their tours with Of Montreal, MGMT and Streetlght Manifesto.

=== Height With Friends ===
In December 2008, Height began performing with Mickey Free, Emily Slaughter and Travis Allen. They began billing themselves as Height With Friends. The name change was intended to help present the project as an official band, without distancing themselves from the earlier Height material. The name change was also meant to acknowledge a new, more collaborative production style.

Although they continued to perform some older Height songs, their new songs were specifically created to be performed live, by multiple vocalists. The line-up would change frequently. In addition to the original cast, they would also be joined by Gavin Riley, Brendan Richmond, Liz Aeby, Cathy Cathodic, Bob O'Brien and Plucky Walker of Flesh Epic.

=== Baltimore Highlands ===
Baltimore Highlands, the first record under the name Height With Friends, was released on Wham City Records in January 2009. The album was created by a more collaborative approach, with multiple producers working together on most tracks. In an interview about the album with Butterteam.com, Jones described the album's production as being like a "chain letter," with each producer adding an element and passing it on to someone else.

In May 2009, the album was supported by the Wham City Records Is Real Tour, with Ed Schrader. They went on three other tours supporting the album that year, with Nuclear Power Pants, Thank You, Future Islands and Lord Grunge as tour mates.

This album was followed by the release of the Baltimore Highlands Remix Album, which was released in October 2009. It contained remixes by Tobacco, San Serac, Lesser Gonzalez, Drew Swinburne, Cex, Ms. Paintbursh, PT Burnem, King Rhythm, Jones, AK, LOWD, DJ Authentic, Gavin Riley and Al Lover.

=== Bed of Seeds ===
Bed of Seeds was written, recorded and mixed between Fall 2009 and Spring 2010. Much of the recording took place during a ten-day session in a makeshift studio in a cabin in Deep Creek Lake, Maryland. The album's production was financed by Normative Records. The label folded as the album was being mixed, but the record was picked up by Friends Records and released in May 2010.

This is the first Height With Friends project largely created with live instruments. The majority of the album's songs stray from the beats and rhymes format, employing chord structures and production styles from other forms of music. The rhyme schemes themselves sometimes resemble folk or pop verses, more than they do standard sixteen bar rap verses.

The album was initially promoted with a two-month tour in April and May 2010. The April portion of the tour was with Nuclear Power Pants. Due to problems at the pressing plant, the vinyl was not available until the tail end of the tour. They continued promoting the album with two more short tours in 2010, then a 51-day tour in February 2011. For their last tour in support of Bed Of Seeds, Height With Friends joined PT Burnem for The Rap Ambassadors Tour. The tour went to Russia, Ukraine, Romania, Hungary, Poland, Croatia and France.

=== Shark Tank ===
Shark Tank is a side project that pairs Height with Lord Grunge, Mickey Free and Brendan Richmond. In February 2011, Shark Tank released their debut self-titled album. They did a small run of east coast shows to support the release.

=== Hemlock Ernst ===
In 2023 Height produced the newest Hemlock Ernst album, The Fall Collection.

=== Videos ===
Height With Friends has four videos, and Height has one video of this solo material. The video for their song "Mike Stone," was directed by Justin Barnes and produced by Team G. It was nominated for an award for Best Music Video at the 2010 SXSW Film Festival.

=== Cold Rhymes Records ===
Height established the label Cold Rhymes Records in 2012. This indie label currently supports a number of North American artists.

== Height Zone World Podcast ==
Keech interviews mostly Baltimore artists and musicians for his podcast. Each episode is hosted on Spilce Today and features an original homage album cover by Mike Riley. It has been streaming weekly since June 2014 and has featured such guests as Jenn Wasner, Dan Deacon, Sam Herring, Girl Talk, and Ed Schrader.

== Discography ==
*Height (2000)
No.	Title	Producer(s)	Length
1.	"Burning Bush Intro"	Kid Icarus and Height	1:05
2.	"1988"	Shields	2:35
3.	"Bingo Bango"	Kid Icarus	1:58
4.	"Jones Control"	Kid Icarus	2:37
5.	"I Shot the Shit out of It"	Wounds	2:51
6.	"And We Rocked it Outside" (with Kid Icarus)	Shields and Kid Icarus	1:28
7.	"String Game" (with Grand Buffet)	Kid Icarus	2:15
8.	"Get Air in Your Lungs"	Shields	2:26
9.	"Backalongtimeago"	Jones	2:10
10.	"Wax Wails" (with MC Dogg)	Kid Icarus	2:23
11.	"Straight Out of the Pipes"	Shields	3:00
12.	"Stormy Veins" (with Wounds)	Wounds	3:08

*I Have a Gun (2003)
No.	Title	Producer(s)	Length
1.	"Intro"	Bow N' Arrow and Height	0:41
2.	"Baltimore Bump"	Shields	3:05
3.	"Rap Songs"	Shields	3:05
4.	"Mr. and Mrs."	Shields	1:31
5.	"Friendly People"	Shields	2:55
6.	"Time to Slam"	Height	2:27
7.	"Peach Pit"	Shields	1:32
8.	"Catonsville"	Shields	2:41
9.	"Warning"	Height	1:10
10.	"Hawaiian Coat"	Shields	2:47
11.	"Little Nova"	Shields	3:30
12.	"Electric Shox"	Shields	2:47
13.	"Wheel it Back"	Shields and Height	3:34
14.	"Height the Scary Man"	Shields	0:58
15.	"Throwing MC's in the Trash"	Shields	2:37
16.	"Throwing MC's in the Trash Two"	Shields	1:27
17.	"Shouts"	Shields	0:56
18.	"Dr. Rap"	Shields	5:07
19.	"Untitled" (hidden track)		2:05

*Utility Fog (2006)
No.	Title	Length
1.	"Utility Fog"	0:13
2.	"Same Track"	2:17
3.	"Full Throttle Yo's"	0:47
4.	"CHS"	2:22
5.	"Going Down Big"	1:53
6.	"Slow Rinse Map"	0:49
7.	"Gold"	2:13
8.	"Hanging Out Late All Alone (2003 Version)"	2:24

*Winterize the Game (2007)
No.	Title	Producer(s)	Length
1.	"Hey"	Shields	0:12
2.	"Scream and Moan"	Shields	1:48
3.	"Beat to the Heat"	Shields	0:55
4.	"Bad Weather" (with Jackson O'Connell-Barlow of Grand Buffet)	Jackson	2:41
5.	"Hanging Out Late All Alone"	Shields	2:59
6.	"Pipe Down"	Shields	2:14
7.	"Florida"	Shields	1:03
8.	"Winterize the Game"	Bow N' Arrow	2:25
9.	"Smash Your Eyes" (with Bow N' Arrow)	Bow N' Arrow	2:33
10.	"Different Steezes"	Jones	1:28
11.	"Snow Day"	Jones	1:55
12.	"These Dreams are Fucked" (with Jarrod Weeks (as Lord Grunge) of Grand Buffet)	Shields	5:41

*Utility Fog Two (2007)
No.	Title	Length
1.	"Intro"	0:09
2.	"Mountain Man"	1:58
3.	"Posted Up"	1:29
4.	"Did We Do Our Thing? (Yes)"	1:57
5.	"Showbeast Theme"	0:50
6.	"Escape Tune"	1:19
7.	"Same Track Remix"	2:12
8.	"Cold Rhymes"	2:40

*Utility Fog Three (2008)
No.	Title	Length
1.	"CDR City"	0:49
2.	"Claw One"	1:45
3.	"Claw Two"	0:35
4.	"Roy"	1:53
5.	"Rally Cap"	1:17
6.	"White Interlude"	0:15
7.	"Code Of Love (2008 Sneak Peek Mix)"	2:29

*Castle Raps (2008)
No.	Title	Length
1.	"Laserbeams"
2.	"Hot Lamps"
3.	"7 Cities"
4.	"Castle Rap"
5.	"Laserbeams (Remix)"

*Baltimore Highlands (2009)
No.	Title	Length
1.	"Mike Stone"	2:13
2.	"Jackson Whites"	2:41
3.	"The World"	2:05
4.	"Escape Tune"	1:37
5.	"Baltimore Highlands"	2:17
6.	"The Woods"	1:56
7.	"Code Of Love"	2:42
8.	"Twelve Strings"	1:31
9.	"Standing Up Asleep"	2:26
10.	"Woods Reprise"	0:57
11.	"Travel Rap"	2:40
12.	"Cold And Shaken"	3:05

*Utility Fog Four (2009)
No.	Title	Length
1.	"Intro"	0:10
2.	"Height Zone World"	2:08
3.	"One Enemy"	2:18
4.	"Get Your Dick Ready"	2:38
5.	"Coast Is Clear"	1:33
6.	"A Secret Thing 2009"	2:23
7.	"Orchards"	2:06
8.	"Pimlico"	1:52
9.	"2009 (pre-mix)"	1:18
10.	"8 Lanes"	1:43
11.	"Baltimore Highlands (Live at Zodiac)"	1:56
12.	"Map Rap"	1:59
13.	"Cold Rhymes Two"	3:10

*Baltimore Highlands Remix Album (2009)
No.	Title	Length
1.	"Baltimore Highlands (Drew Swinburne Remix)"	2:30
2.	"Mike Stone (Gavin Riley Remix)"	2:02
3.	"Jackson Whites (Ms. Paintbrush Remix)"	1:51
4.	"The World (PT Burnem Remix)"	2:03
5.	"Escape Tune (Lesser Gonzalez Remix)"	2:01
6.	"Baltimore Highlands (Tobacco Remix)"	2:40
7.	"The Woods (King Rhythm Remix)"	3:13
8.	"Code Of Love (San Serac Remix)"	3:37
9.	"Twelve Strings (Jones Remix)"	1:57
10.	"Standing Up Asleep (DJ Authentic Remix)"	2:45
11.	"Woods Reprise (Drew Swinburne Remix)"	1:07
12.	"Travel Rap (LOWD Remix)"	4:08
13.	"Cold And Shaken (AK Remix)"	4:56
14.	"Mike Stone (Al Lover Remix)"	2:27
15.	"The Woods (Cex Remix)"	9:00

*Swiss Chard (2009)
No.	Title	Length
1.	"Right Road"
2.	"Pinecone Boys"
3.	"Ferryboat"
4.	"Swiss Chard"
5.	"Rock Roll Jam Mix"

*Bed Of Seeds (2010)
No.	Title	Length
1.	"Bed Of Seeds"	1:51
2.	"No Way To Win"	2:19
3.	"Dreams Don't Always Come True"	2:03
4.	"Deep In The Dark"	2:15
5.	"Link Wray"	2:15
6.	"Cold Crush"	2:27
7.	"Cavalcade Lagoons"	2:34
8.	"I'm Shook"	2:36
9.	"Windpipe"	2:34
10.	"Where No One Can See"	2:09
11.	"Seeds Reprise"	0:42
12.	"Druid Hill Lake"	3:03

*Shark Tank (as part of Shark Tank) (2010)
No.	Title	Length
1.	"Red Rain"	2:19
2.	"Don't Shoot"	2:39
3.	"Nighttime Men"	1:30
4.	"Phone Call"	0:49
5.	"Drink Drinks"	3:13
6.	"No Sleep"	1:27
7.	"Miserable"	0:31
8.	"Von Dutch"	2:10
9.	"Aces of Cake"	2:02
10.	"Rap Everglades"	3:01
11.	"Jimland"	1:51
12.	"Enjoy"	0:27
13.	"Oh No!"	2:48
14.	"Buggin Out"	2:24
15.	"Yeah"	0:49
16.	"I Can't See It"	4:20

*Rock and Roll (2012)
No.	Title	Length
1.	"I Can't Stand To Be Refused"	3:48
2.	"Mustard Seed"	2:13
3.	"Dead Motor"	2:54
4.	"I Can't Stop Eating Sugar" ((Ed Schrader Cover))	1:52
5.	"Hard Work"	2:13
6.	"Too Much Time"	2:55
7.	"Triumph Over Sadness"	1:01
8.	"Oswego Speedway"	2:28
9.	"Moscow"	6:34
