= Chuck Sammarone =

American politician (born 1943)

Charles Sammarone

48th Mayor of Youngstown
- In office 2011–2013
- Preceded by: Jay Williams
- Succeeded by: John McNally IV

Personal details
- Born: 1943 (age 82–83) Youngstown, Ohio
- Party: Democratic
- Spouse: Mary Ann Rango
- Education: Youngstown State University Westminster College
- Profession: government

Charles Sammarone was the mayor of the industrial city of Youngstown in northeastern Ohio.

Prior to serving in elected governmental positions, he worked as a teacher, coach and administrator in local schools. From 1990 onward he served as president of the city council.

== Notes ==
Political offices
Preceded by Jay Williams	Mayor of Youngstown, Ohio; 2011–2013	Succeeded by John McNally IV
