= Patrick Ungaro =

American politician (1941–2019)

Patrick J. Ungaro (March 3, 1941 – August 17, 2019) was an Ohio politician, most noted for his long tenure as mayor of the industrial city of Youngstown, having served in the position from 1984 to 1997. He was a member of the Democratic Party. While in office he introduced projects to renovate brownfield sites.

Prior to his job as mayor, he was an educator in the Youngstown City School system.

After leaving the mayor's office, Ungaro re-located just north of Youngstown to Liberty Township. He worked in government there as a township administrator until 2019, having been appointed to the post in 2002.

Political offices
Preceded by George Vukovich	Mayor of Youngstown, Ohio; 1984–1997	Succeeded by George McKelvey
