= Charles P. Henderson =

American politician (1911–1990)

Mayor of Youngstown, Ohio
- In office 1948–1954
- Preceded by: Ralph W. O'Neill
- Succeeded by: Frank X. Kryzan

Personal details
- Born: March 3, 1911; Youngstown, Ohio, U.S.
- Died: September 15, 1990 (aged 79); New York City, U.S.
- Cause of death: Heart attack
- Resting place: Belmont Park Cemetery, Liberty Township, Trumbull County, Ohio, U.S.
- Political party: Republican
- Spouse: Margaret S. Arms
- Profession: Politician

Military service
- Allegiance: United States
- Branch/service: United States Army
- Battles/wars: World War II

Charles P. Henderson (March 3, 1911 – September 15, 1990) was a Republican Ohio politician who served as mayor of Youngstown, Ohio from 1948 to 54. In 1953, he was appointed by President Dwight D. Eisenhower as a member of the Commission on Intergovernmental Relations.

Political offices
Preceded by Ralph W. O'Neill	Mayor of Youngstown, Ohio; 1948–1954	Succeeded by Frank X. Kryzan
