= John McNally IV =

American lawyer

John A. McNally IV

49th Mayor of Youngstown
- In office December 30, 2013 – December 31, 2017
- Preceded by: Chuck Sammarone
- Succeeded by: Jamael Tito Brown

Personal details
- Born: 1969 (age 56–57) Youngstown, Ohio, U.S.
- Party: Democratic Party
- Spouse: Virginia McNally
- Education: Ursuline High School
- Alma mater: Georgetown University; Cleveland State University
- Profession: Attorneys in the United States

John A. McNally IV (born c. 1969) is a former mayor of Youngstown, Ohio.

McNally was born and raised in Youngstown and graduated from Ursuline High School in 1987. He earned a Bachelor of Science degree in Foreign Service from Georgetown University in 1991 and a Juris Doctor and Master of Public Administration from the Cleveland-Marshall College of Law and the Maxine Goodman Levin College of Urban Affairs at Cleveland State University in 1996.

McNally served as Assistant Law Director for the City of Youngstown from 1998 to 2002, later serving as Law Director from 2002 to 2004. He was elected twice as Mahoning County Commissioner before retiring from that office in order to run for Mayor of Youngstown. He won the general election on November 5, 2013, and was sworn in on December 30, 2013.

On May 14, 2014, McNally was indicted by the State of Ohio on 25 felony and nine misdemeanor charges stemming from Mahoning County's purchase of the office building Oakhill Renaissance Place during his tenure as County Commissioner. He pleaded guilty to these charges February 26, 2016 in a deal that allowed him to remain Mayor of Youngstown.

On May 2, 2017, McNally lost to Jamael Tito Brown in the Democratic primary election in his bid for re-election. McNally was only the second Mayor in the history of the City of Youngstown not to get elected to a second term.

Political offices
Preceded by Chuck Sammarone	Mayor of Youngstown, Ohio; 2013–17	Succeeded by Jamael Tito Brown
