= William Anderson (political scientist) =

American political scientist (1888–1975)

William Anderson (October 25, 1888 – May 1975) was a U.S. political scientist, who served on national commissions in the 1940s and 1950s.

He received an A.B. degree from the University of Minnesota in 1913, and an A.M. and Ph.D. from Harvard University in 1914 and 1917. He was an instructor of government at Harvard until 1916, and then on the faculty of the University of Minnesota from 1916 to 1957, serving as professor and chairman of the political science department.

He served as a member of the Commission on the Organization of the Executive Branch of Government in 1947–1948, and on the Commission on Intergovernmental Relations in 1953–1955.

He wrote at least twelve books on political science topics.
