= Pittsburgh Hearts =

EP by Grand Buffet
- Released: 2003
- Genre: Alternative hip hop
- Producer: Jarrod Brandon Weeks, Jackson O'Connell-Barlow

Grand Buffet chronology
Cigarette Beach (2002)	Pittsburgh Hearts (2003)	Dicer: The Unheard Funk Tracks (2004)

Pittsburgh Hearts is the third and last in the Trilogy of Terror, a series of three EPs by Pittsburgh alternative hip hop duo, Grand Buffet. It's the first release on which they're credited by their real names. On previous releases, they had used a variety of stage names. The credits of back of the album's artwork, Jarrod announces that he has a daughter named Sugar Marie Weeks. The final track "Thank You. Goodbye. We'll Die." is an outro. It is where they discuss the album and diss various business. They manage to use the word "fuck" 47 times in a little under 3 minutes. This was first album in the trilogy, to not have a hidden track. It is also their last album to have a parental advisory label on the front cover.

== Track listing ==
All music is composed by Jarrod Brandon Weeks and Jackson O'Connell-Barlow unless otherwise noted.

No.	Title	Length
1.	"We're Into This"	2:14
2.	"Fun As Hell"	3:10
3.	"Cool As Hell"	2:20
4.	"Americus (Religious Right Rock)"	2:17
5.	"Benjamin Franklin Music"	2:33
6.	"Don't Kill Yourself, Thrill Yourself!"	2:03
7.	"Stocking Stuffer"	1:47
8.	"Thank You. Goodbye. We'll Die."	2:52

== Music videos ==
A video for "Cool As Hell" appears on the CD/DVD release, Five Years of Fireworks.
