= Alverna Babbs Williams =

American aviator

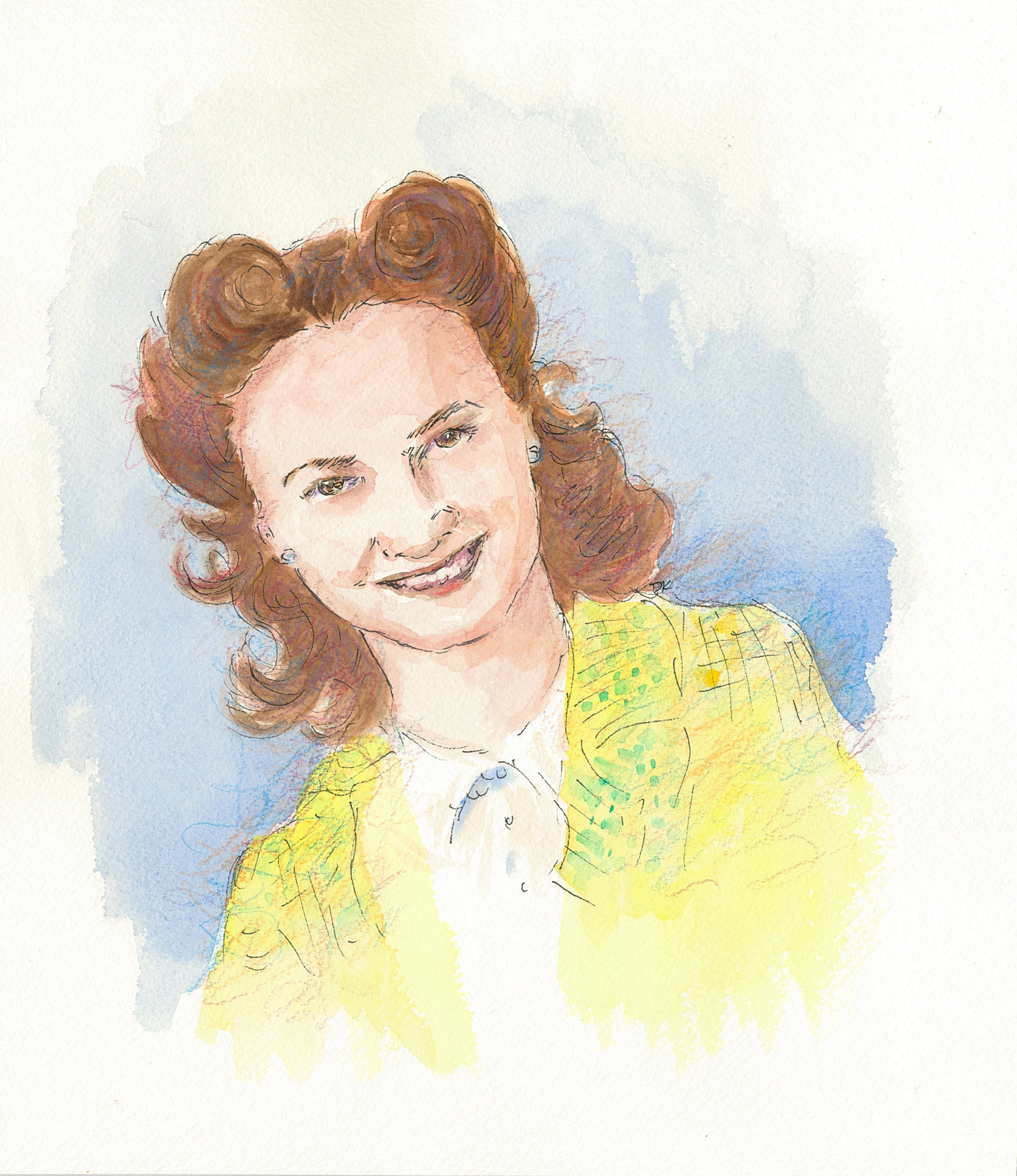
- Born: September 3, 1918; Farrell
- Died: March 7, 2007
- Education: Youngstown State University, Parks College of Engineering, Aviation and Technology
- Employer: Ringling Bros. and Barnum & Bailey Circus

Alverna Babbs Williams (née Bennett, September 3, 1918 – March 7, 2007) was the first American pilot with disabilities to earn a pilot's license.

== Personal life ==
Alverna Bennett was born on September 3, 1918 in Farrell, Pennsylvania. Alverna had both her legs amputated above the knee after surviving a car crash when she was thirteen months old.

In October 1936, Bennett married Louis “Speedy” Babbs, who owned a motordrome and raced motorcycles. Bennett and Babbs honeymooned in Honolulu. They divorced in 1948 or 1949.

Alverna then married Albert “Flash” Williams and had a son with him in 1949.

Alverna had gone by several different names, including Alverna Daisy Bennett, Alverna Daisy Babbs, and her official registered name at the time of her death, Alverna Daisy Williams. Her biographical file in the National Air and Space Museum archives is “Babbs (Williams), Alverna Daisy Bennett”.

== Career ==
In 1935, Bennett became a featured acrobatic dancer and trapeze artist with Ringling Brothers Circus and toured the United States. After marrying her husband in 1936, they continued to travel across country with their various acts.

In 1942, Alverna Babbs took an aeronautical course at Youngstown College. In 1943, Louis and Alverna bought a General Skyfarer to celebrate their seventh anniversary. Alverna nicknamed the plane, “Seventh Heaven.”

In 1944, Alverna Babbs tried to obtain a student flying permit but was denied by the Civil Aeronautics Administration (CAA) even though she had followed all proper procedures to do so. On September 19, 1944, with the help of Roscue Turner, Alverna Babbs received her student permit after certain CAA regulations were changed. Alverna Babbs made her first solo flight on October 30, 1944. In 1946, she earned her pilot's license.

In 1973, Alverna joined the Ninety-Nines. She attended Mountain View Junior College in the fall of 1975 for an instrument ground course. In 1977, Alverna participated as a solo pilot in the 30th Anniversary Powder Puff Derby Commemorative Flight from California to Florida that was being held on July 2 - July 5. However, due to a fuel leak, Alverna had to complete the flight with the help of Suzanne Parish. In addition of the Ninety-Nines, Alverna was also a member of the Experimental Aircraft Association (EAA), Ercoupe Owners Club, Aircraft Owners and Pilots Association (AOPA), and Silver Wings.

== Awards and honors ==
In 1977, Alverna was honored by The Wheelchair Association. She was also named “Lady Ercouper of the Year.” The city of Grand Prairie, where she lived, officially declared November 7 to be “Alverna Williams Day.” Texas Representative Dale Milford had an honorarium read into the Congressional Record for “A Remarkable Woman—Alverna Williams ” on December 15, 1977.

== Death and legacy ==
Alverna died on March 7, 2007.
