= The Political Graveyard =

Online database of American political figures

- Website type: Political
- Available in: English
- Owner: Lawrence Kestenbaum
- Website: politicalgraveyard.com
- Launched: 1996

The Political Graveyard is a website and database that catalogues information on more than 277,000 American political figures and political families, along with other information. The name comes from the website's inclusion of burial locations of the deceased (when known). It is also a pun; where bodies are buried can refer to the politicians accused of crimes or touched by scandal.

== History ==
The site was created in 1996 by Lawrence Kestenbaum, then an academic specialist at Michigan State University, and later on staff at the University of Michigan.

Kestenbaum was formerly a county commissioner, and in 2004 was elected to be County Clerk/Register of Deeds of Washtenaw County, Michigan.

Some are listed in categories, including occupations, ethnicity, religious and organizational affiliation, honors, and awards. "For example, 18 politicians were born into slavery; six have been in space; 69 survived assassination attempts; and 908 were in trouble or disgraced." An exhaustive cataloging of transgressions are listed by the nature of the accusation, as well as by decade and by state.
