= Joe Malmisur =

American football coach and administrator (1929–2018)

Biographical details
- Born: March 13, 1929
- Died: October 14, 2018 (aged 89)

Playing career
- 1947–1950: Heidelberg
- Position: Quarterback

Coaching career (HC unless noted)
- 1951–1952: Heidelberg (assistant)
- 1955–1957: Wellston HS (OH)
- 1958–1961: Lima HS (OH)
- 1962–1968: Heidelberg
- 1969–1982: Hiram

Administrative career (AD unless noted)
- 1983–1994: Youngstown State

Head coaching record
- Overall: 68–107–8 (college)

Accomplishments and honors

Championships
- 1 PAC (1982)

Joseph F. Malmisur (March 13, 1929 – October 14, 2018) was an American football coach and college athletics administrator. He served as the head football coach at Heidelberg College—now known as Heidelberg University—in Tiffin, Ohio from 1962 to 1968 and Hiram College in Hiram, Ohio from 1969 to 1982, compiling a career college football coaching record of 68–107–8. Malmisur ended his career as the athletic director at Youngstown State University from 1983 to 1994.

A native of Youngstown, Ohio, Malmisur played college football at Heidelberg, starting at quarterback from 1948 to 1950. After graduating in 1951, he remained at Heidelberg for two years as an assistant football coach under head coach Paul Hoernemann. Malmisur was the head football coach at Wellston High School in Wellston, Ohio from 1955 to 1957 and Lima High School in Lima, Ohio from 1958 to 1961.

== Head coaching record ==
=== College football ===
Year	Team	Overall	Conference	Standing	Bowl/playoffs
Heidelberg Student Princes (Ohio Athletic Conference) (1962–1968)
1962	Heidelberg	2–7	2–5	T–10th	
1963	Heidelberg	1–7–1	1–5–1	12th	
1964	Heidelberg	3–5–1	2–4	T–10th	
1965	Heidelberg	2–5–2	1–5–1	12th	
1966	Heidelberg	3–4–1	2–3	T–8th	
1967	Heidelberg	4–4–1	2–4	T–9th	
1968	Heidelberg	2–7	0–6	13th	
Heidelberg:		17–39–6	10–32–2		
Hiram Terriers (Ohio Athletic Conference) (1969–1970)
1969	Hiram	3–5	2–5	11th	
1970	Hiram	2–6	2–5	T–10th	
Hiram Terriers (NCAA College Division football season) (1971)
1971	Hiram	1–7			
Hiram Terriers (Presidents' Athletic Conference) (1972–1982)
1972	Hiram	2–6	2–5	7th	
1973	Hiram	5–4	4–3	T–4th	
1974	Hiram	4–4–1	3–3–1	T–4th	
1975	Hiram	4–5	3–3	T–3rd	
1976	Hiram	3–6	2–5	T–5th	
1977	Hiram	3–6	3–4	5th	
1978	Hiram	6–2	5–2	2nd	
1979	Hiram	3–5	3–4	T–4th	
1980	Hiram	2–6–1	2–4–1	6th	
1981	Hiram	6–3	5–2	T–2nd	
1982	Hiram	6–3	6–1	1st	
Hiram:		51–68–2	42–46–2		
Total:		68–107–8			
National championship Conference title Conference division title or championship game berth
