= Mary Ann Campana =

Italian aviator

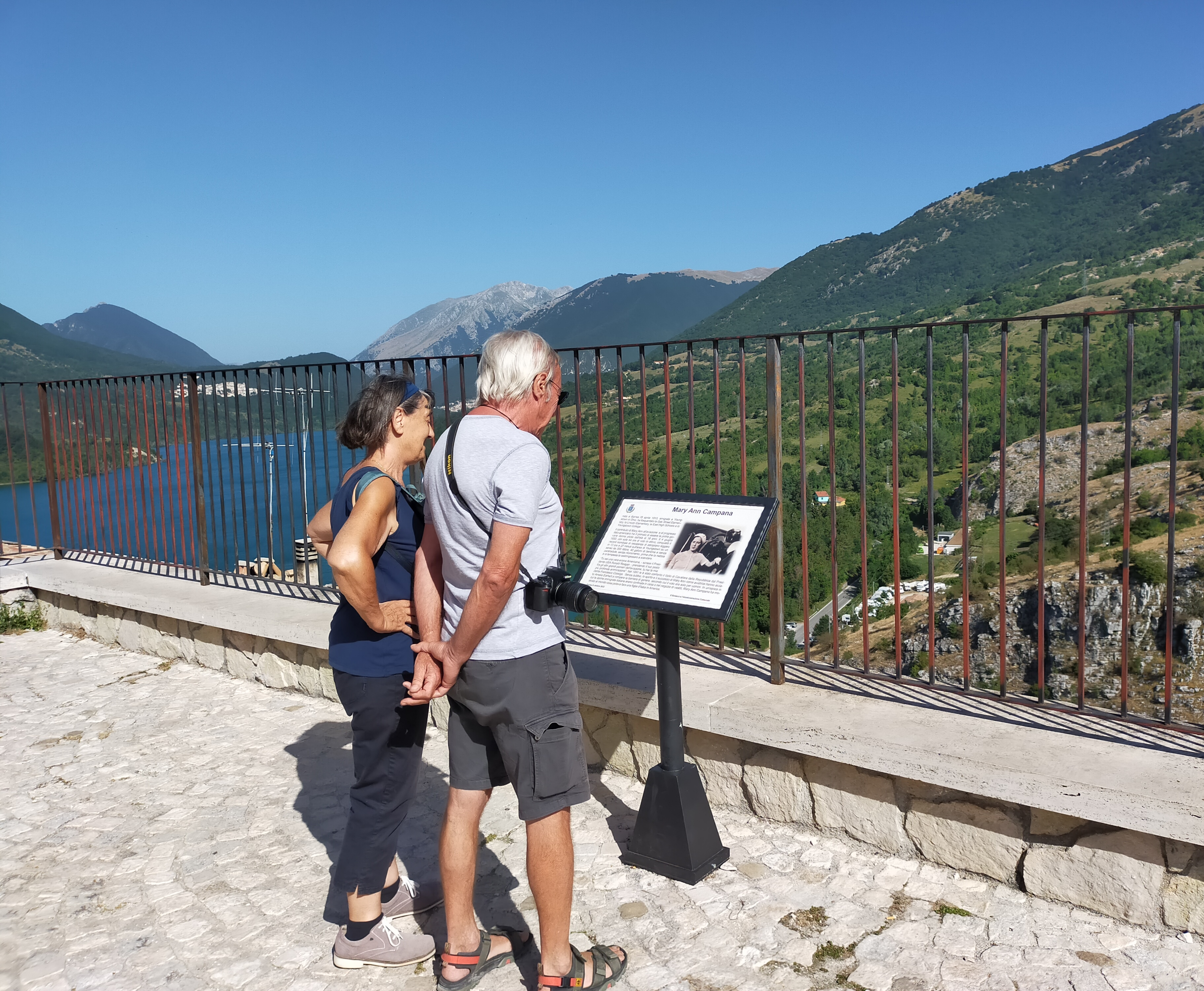
- Born: Edvige Bianca Maria Campana; April 8, 1913; Barrea, Italy
- Died: 2009 (aged 95–96); Lakewood, Ohio
- Occupations: aviator and businessperson

Mary Ann Campana, born Edvige Bianca Maria Campana (Barrea, Italy, April 8, 1913 – 2009), emigrated to the United States and became the first woman in Ohio to earn a pilot's license. She went on to set an aviation world endurance record in light aircraft in 1933.

== Biography ==
Edvige Campana was born in Barrea (AQ), in Abruzzo, on April 8, 1913 to Salvatore Campana and Maria Lombardozzi. In 1921, she emigrated with her four sisters and her parents in search of work, and settled in Youngstown, Ohio, which was a thriving industrial center where an uncle already lived. Taking "Mary Ann" as her first name, she was educated at Lincoln Elementary and East High School. Later she attended Youngstown College. She was working part-time at a Murphy Five and Ten store, but became so passionate about aviation that she attended a flight course at the Youngstown–Warren Regional Airport, which allowed her to obtain a pilot's license in 1932, at the age of 18, becoming the first woman in Ohio to do so.

On June 4, 1933, the then 20-year-old pioneer of civil aviation (with 44 hours of flying time) broke the world endurance record in the light aircraft class over the skies of Mahoning County by flying a monoplane loaded with 40 gallons of gasoline for 12 hours and 27 minutes without a parachute and without refueling. Her feat broke the previous world record of 11 hours and 17 minutes.

Campana flew for the last time in 1943, after which she devoted her time to business and entrepreneurship, especially the Strouss-Hirshberg department store and the May Company. Finally, she was a co-owner of the Pollyanna Clothes, a children's clothing chain.

Campana retired to Lakewood in Cuyahoga County near Cleveland, Ohio, where she died in 2009 at the age of 96.

== Honors ==
Knight of the Order of Merit of the Italian Republic – ordinary uniform ribbon: "On the initiative of the President of the Republic Francesco Cossiga" – October 11, 1990

== Other acknowledgments ==
- In 1993, one of the Ohio Historical Markers was dedicated to Mary Ann Campana. (Marker is located to the right of the entrance door to the Youngstown Warren Regional Airport.)
- She received awards and honors from President Ronald Reagan, and from the National Aeronautic Association and the National Air and Space Museum.
- In 2015, an exhibition dedicated to her was set up at the Ernie Hall Aviation Museum in Warren, Ohio.
- In 2022, a commemorative plaque was unveiled in her birthplace, the municipality of Barrea, Italy.
