= George McKelvey (mayor) =

American politician

Mayor of Youngstown, Ohio
- In office 1998–2006
- Preceded by: Patrick Ungaro
- Succeeded by: Jay Williams

Personal details
- Born: George M. McKelvey
- Party: Democratic
- Profession: Politician, educator

George M. McKelvey is an American politician. A Democrat, he served two terms as Mayor of Youngstown, Ohio, from 1998 to 2005. Prior to serving as mayor, he served two terms as the Treasurer of Mahoning County. He has also been a teacher, school administrator and city council member in Youngstown.

In 2004, he broke ranks with his Democratic party to endorse Republican President George W. Bush for a second term.

In March 2008, McKelvey was named a U.S. Observer with the International Fund for Ireland.

== Notes ==
Political offices
Preceded by Patrick Ungaro	Mayor of Youngstown, Ohio; 1999–2006	Succeeded by Jay Williams
