= John McGinness =

American physicist (born 1943)

John Edward McGinness
- Born: November 19, 1943 (age 82)
- Education: Rice University
- Scientific career
- Workplaces: Youngstown State University; University of Texas Health Science Center at Houston; Harris County Psychiatric Center

John Edward McGinness (born November 19, 1943), is an American physicist and physician. McGinness worked in the fields of organic electronics and nanotechnology.

== Education ==
McGinness studied physics at the University of Houston, and after his B.S. in 1966 he received his PhD in Nuclear Physics, Material Science, and Space Science at Rice University in 1970.

He received his MD from the University of Texas Health Science Center at Houston (UTHealth) in 1985 and worked in internal medicine for one year, changing to psychiatry and working at the Department of Psychiatry, UTHealth, from 1989 to 1992. He authored roughly 40 research publications, book chapters, and presentations.

== Work ==
John McGinness materially contributed to the modern field of organic electronics.

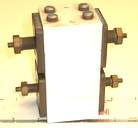
An organic polymer voltage-controlled switch from 1974. Now in the Smithsonian Chip collection

In 1972, while working at the Metallurgy department at Youngstown State University, McGinness suggested that electronic conduction in melanins (polyacetylene, polypyrrole, and polyaniline "blacks" and their copolymers) is analogous to conduction in amorphous solids such as the chalcogenide glasses. This area was originally pioneered by Sir Nevill Mott, among others. That is, it involves such things as mobility gaps, phonon-assisted hopping, polarons, quantum tunneling, and so forth.

From Youngstown, McGinness moved to the Physics Department of The University of Texas M. D. Anderson Cancer Center. The department had an interest in the physical properties of melanin as a possible hook to treating melanoma. While of enormous importance now, this area was a research backwater at the time. With the notable exception of Bolto et al., who had reported high conductivity in iodine-doped polypyrrole, few but melanoma researchers had much reason to look at the electronic properties of such rigid-backbone polymer "blacks". This is why the putative first molecular electronic device came from a cancer hospital.

The chalcogenide glasses show "switching", in which an applied "threshold voltage" reversibly switches a material from a low-conductivity "OFF" state to a high-conductivity "ON' state. The similarity of conduction mechanisms suggested that the melanins might also demonstrate voltage-controlled switching. Following this lead, McGinness and his MD Anderson coworkers constructed a voltage-controlled switch incorporating melanin as its active element . They also further characterized its electronic behavior.

Since he was at a cancer research institute, McGinness' other interests included the role of free radicals in the action and toxicity of the anticancer drugs cisplatin, adriamycin, and bleomycin. He was the first to show that the kidney toxicity of cisplatin involves reactive oxygen species. Some of this work was done with Harry Demopoulos. McGinness was also involved in the dielectric spectroscopy of water bound to membranes. This was related to the future development of magnetic resonance imaging.
