= Michelle Pesce =

American DJ

Michelle Pesce (born in Youngstown, Ohio, United States) is an American DJ.

Pesce began her career working at Wolf-Kasteler, a public relations firm, where she represented a wide variety of musicians and actors. In 1999 she attended Woodstock '99 where she became inspired to become a DJ. Pesce soon bought her first set of turntables and after about a year she met DJ Spinderella of Salt-n-Pepa, who then became a mentor to her. She decided to leave Wolf-Kasteler in 2004 to pursue her DJ career full-time.

Pesce has now played at many events and clubs across the globe and is a staple of the Hollywood party scene. She is a very sought-after DJ on the event scene. Pesce spins weekly at LA hot spot The Dime and has also performed for VIP crowds at parties like the Academy Awards, Golden Globes, Coachella and the Grammy Awards Official After-Party.

Pesce also had a cameo on the popular HBO show Entourage during its third season. In 2013, DJ Michelle joined the Yahoo! on the Road National tour, performing with artists like Fun, The Lumineers, Capital Cities and Gossip.
