= Cigarette Beach =

EP by Grand Buffet
- Released: 2002
- Genre: Alternative hip hop
- Label: none
- Producer: Jarrod Brandon Weeks, Jackson O'Connell-Barlow

Grand Buffet chronology
Undercover Angels (2002)	Cigarette Beach (2002)	Pittsburgh Hearts (2003)

Professional ratings
Review scores
Source	Rating
Stylus Magazine	B link

Cigarette Beach is the second in the Trilogy of Terror, a series of three EPs by Pittsburgh alternative hip hop duo Grand Buffet. Although no singles were released, three songs later appeared on the compilation album Five Years Of Fireworks: "Oh My God You're Weird!", "Matt And Nate", and "Murderfuck". This album is one Grand Buffet's most popular releases.

== Track listing ==
All music is composed by Jarrod Brandon Weeks (as Matt Kukla) and Jackson O'Connell-Barlow (as Nate Kukla) unless otherwise noted.

No.	Title	Length
1.	"Start Smoking (What's Up, Gold?)"	2:34
2.	"Barbecue Gloves"	2:14
3.	"The Old Folk Smashers"	0:42
4.	"Oh My God You're Weird!"	2:02
5.	"Matt And Nate"	1:17
6.	"Intruder Excluder"	2:35
7.	"Chew On A Rubber!"	1:35
8.	"Nate Kukla's History Of Lemonade"	2:16
9.	"Murderfuck"	2:51
10.	"Thus Ends The Beach"	6:18

== Notes ==
- "Thus Ends The Beach" is a relatively short outro followed by several minutes of silence and a short untitled hidden track. Counting the silent break, it is the longest track on the album. It is the last track of Cigarette Beach, which mainly consists of the band members talking casually about the album.
- Grand Buffet have stated that the word "Batman" is hidden on the album by backmasking.
