= ERating =

Program for passenger vehicles

The four levels of the eRating certification

eRating is a certification, education, and labeling program for passenger vehicles in the United States. It was developed by Certification for Sustainable Transport (CST) at the University of Vermont.

CST uses eRating to rate vehicles based on several criteria. These include greenhouse gas emissions per passenger mile, emissions, alternative fuels, purchase of carbon offsets, and training programs that promote energy efficient driving.

If the vehicle meets enough standards, it receives an eRating certification.

== Program description ==
The eRating program is an independent, third party certification, education and labeling initiative for owners and operators, manufacturers and passengers of transportation vehicles. The eRating also functions as a sustainability index that weighs factors such as greenhouse gasses per passenger mile, environmental impacts, and even the use of alternative fuels and technologies in the transportation industry.

Two major works were used in developing the eRating : the Federal Trade Commission's Part 260-Guide for the Use of Environmental Marketing Claims, and the International Social and Environmental Accreditation and Labeling Alliance (ISEAL) planning framework. In May 2012, CST finalized Step B-3, and transitioned to step E-1 to launch the eRating program. The CST was designed to help improve economic, environmental, and energy efficiency within the passenger transportation sector. The program uses research-based criteria to evaluate vehicles and includes the driver training programs "Idle Free" and "Eco-Driving 101" to improve efficiency.

=== Idle Free Training Program ===
This course teaches drivers about the health, environmental, and financial impacts of idling a vehicle. Health experts, vehicle manufacturers, and vehicle operators have all given their testimony about the advantages of idle-free driving. Upon completion of the course, drivers are then able to take an "idle-free pledge", in which they promise to follow the idling guidelines set forth in the course. Completion of this course earns 20 points towards an eRating certification.

=== Eco-Driving 101 Training Program ===
This course teaches drivers about eco-driving. Eco-driving is a set of simple driving habits that result in using less fuel, generating fewer emissions, and increasing safety. The course first explains the science behind eco-driving, as well as the environmental and mechanical benefits of doing so. Drivers are taught techniques such as avoiding aggressive acceleration, speeding and braking monitoring speed to maintain efficient and consistent speed; keeping RPM levels as low as possible for the speed and keeping the vehicle properly maintained, that they can use in their everyday driving in order to cut back on fuel consumption.

The typical eco-driver can increase fuel efficiency by 10-30%. For organizations putting their drivers through this online training program, 20 points will be awarded towards the organizations eRating certification once they reach the 80% driver completion threshold.

=== Benefits ===
The program benefits owners, operators, and manufacturers by helping them reduce vehicle operation costs, save energy, and promote their businesses. The program also benefits consumers by helping them identify and choose the highest performing, lowest impact forms of transportation. Whether displayed on a bus, boat, train, car, bicycle, or plane, an eRating certification label signifies that CST has thoroughly evaluated and certified the vehicle.

== eRating levels and criteria ==
Various features of the vehicle being considered for certification are examined. There are four levels of certification for a vehicle(s) in the eRating program: e1, e2, e3, and e4. The CST uses a point system, or sustainability index, to determine the certification level of a given vehicle. Points are given for more efficient features and attributes of the vehicle, with 100 being required for entry level, or e1, certification. e1 certification represents entry-level certification and e4 certification indicates the highest level. Only the most energy efficient, lowest impacts forms of transportation are eligible for certification; a certification label on a vehicle, be it e1, e2, e3, or e4, lets consumers know that the vehicle has met a set of rigorous sustainability criteria.

=== Certification standards overview ===
The eRating program aims to provide recognition through certification to transportation systems, fleets, operators and individual vehicles that help the passenger transportation sector:

- Reduce greenhouse gas and other harmful emissions
- Increase energy efficiency
- Utilize alternative fuels and new technologies

The eRating program offered four levels of certification on a per vehicle basis to qualifying operators: e1, e2, e3 and e4 certification; e1 certification represents entry-level certification and e4 certification indicates the highest level of certification available. The application process determines which level of certification an operator qualifies. Points are earned based on the following:

- Vehicle technology
- Operation of the vehicle(s) at certain efficiency levels
- Use of particular operating procedures within a company
- Use of specific policies and educational programs within a company

=== Greenhouse gas emissions per passenger mile ===
Points are earned if the vehicle's greenhouse gas emission levels are at least 50% below the U.S. average for 2000-2009 (.274 kg per passenger mile). Minimum qualifications for vehicles must be greater than or equal to an average of 148 passenger miles per gallon. Higher levels of efficiency earn greater points.

=== Criteria pollutant emissions ===
Points are awarded for the use of technologies that reduce emissions such as carbon monoxide, sulfur dioxide, volatile organic compounds and nitrogen oxide. Pollutant producing vehicles, such as those with leaky exhaust systems or that produce excessive amounts of smoke, are automatically disqualified for certification.

=== Alternative fuels ===
The use of alternative fuels besides gasoline or diesel earns a vehicle points ranging from 5-100 towards certification. Qualifying fuels must be used a minimum of 80% of the time.

=== Greenhouse gas offsets ===
Optional points can be earned by purchasing greenhouse gas offsets from endorsed carbon-trading programs. These GHG reduction credits must be purchased through the Climate Action Reserve or Verified Carbon Standard or from another verified organization. These credits must be purchased in the region of intended use and must not be more than two years old. Generally 1 point will be awarded toward certification for every 5% of emissions offset.
