= Pink Mammoth =

San Francisco-based nonprofit

- Company type: Non-Profit Artist Collective
- Founded: San Francisco, CA, 2003
- Headquarters: San Francisco
- Key people: Derek Hena, Rob Adelmann, Zach Walker, Joe Trujillo, Jonathan Will, Ryel & Joli Kestano, Annie Willis, Robin Drysdale, Erin Needham, Rose Goldthwait
- Website: www.pinkmammoth.org

Pink Mammoth is a San Francisco-based non-profit artist collective, founded by Ryel Kestano and Derek Hena in August, 2003. It is based partially on the philosophy of Burning Man, a radically expressive temporary city held annually in the Black Rock Desert of Nevada, and dedicated to unconditional self-support and free expression. It also is influenced by the Buddhist concept of the Boddhisattva, a being dedicated to enabling, supporting, and encouraging others to reach their ultimate state of enlightenment.

The organization has maintained active residencies throughout San Francisco and has performed at significant San Francisco dance music venues including Mighty, Monarch, Public Works, Monroe, Supperclub, Mezzanine, Halcyon, The Midway, The Great Northern, and Audio.

Pink Mammoth also participates in Burning Man, the Love Parade, and many regional burns such as Apogaea. Its participants have represented the collective in Mexico, London, Canada, Japan, New Zealand, and throughout the United States.
