= Roosevelt Zanders =

Roosevelt Smith Zanders (1912–1995) was an American chauffeur and businessperson. He was the owner of New York City limousine service Zanders Auto Rental Service. Starting out with a US$3000 Cadillac, his fleet grew to sixteen cars, including three Rolls-Royces. After establishing the company in Harlem in 1946, he kept the offices and garage in the same neighborhood, even as his client roster began to represent the elite of Fifth Avenue.

== Early life ==
Zanders was born in Valdosta, Georgia, on July 13, either 1910 or 1912, to the alleged Reverend Arthur Zanders and his wife, Ethel Smith Zanders. His father was actually a barber. During his childhood, he won a marbles shooting championship in Georgia and often competed in official games. When he was still a child, his family began relocating to Youngstown, Ohio, where Zanders attended the public schools. On November 3, 1919, his father killed his mother Ethel and a younger brother named Henry with a shotgun, and then shot himself after returning from a trip. With both parents dead, Zanders took a position as a locker room attendant at the Mahoning Valley Country Club to help support himself and his four siblings. In July 1941, Zanders enlisted in Co. E 15th Regiment of the New York Army National Guard and gave his birth date as July 13, 1912 in Youngstown, Ohio. Zanders served in World War II, where he achieved the rank of captain in the U.S. Army.

== Career ==
Zanders was working as a construction engineer on the Alcan Highway in Canada when he developed the concept of offering combined limousine and concierge services, based on his difficulty in obtaining simple things that weren't readily available. He reasoned that travelers would find themselves in a strange environment and need someone to help obtain things they wanted, as well.

Zanders had established his limousine service and was gaining prominence with his concept of personal service by the mid-1950s and was noted to go beyond expectation to provide what amounted to a concierge service to his clients.

His fleet of vehicles consisted entirely of Cadillacs until December 14, 1958, when Zanders' custom-built Rolls-Royce arrived from the factory. Only he drove it. "His helpers drive the Cadillacs", said Gay Talese. In 1963, he appeared in an Ebony magazine article featuring client Muhammad Ali and a New York Life Insurance ad featured in the same edition.

=== Famous clients ===
Zanders' first notable client was Gertrude Lawrence, the British actress who spent her later years in New York City. A neighbor of Zanders worked as a maid to Lawrence's attorney; it was through this connection that she first hired him. Lawrence's connection to Zanders was also mentioned in a 1959 New York Times profile of the limousine owner written by Gay Talese.

According to Talese, anyone who could pay Zanders 150 dollars a day in 1959 was eligible for an entire day of his services. Zanders served as chauffeur to Fidel Castro during his April 15–26, 1959 visit to the United States. Castro insisted upon staying in a Harlem hotel and blamed the neighborhood's poverty on American capitalism.

Roosevelt Zanders drove Richard Nixon around the New York area before and after his presidency. (In the 1960s, Nixon lived in a Fifth Avenue co-op apartment.) Zanders had a large host of famous clients that included Margot Fonteyn Dorothy Kilgallen, Ethel Merman, Winston Churchill, Eleanor Roosevelt, Harry S. Truman, John F. Kennedy, William Holden, Red Skelton, Clark Gable, Lana Turner, Danny Kaye, Eddie Fisher, Nat King Cole, and Aristotle Onassis.

=== Concierge to the stars ===
Besides limousine services, Zanders provided a variety of personal services to his clients. He made hotel and restaurant reservations, arranged for babysitters, picked up dry cleaning, completed banking and obtained theater tickets for his clients. Other services he performed ranged from sending 100 pounds of shrimp to John Wayne while he was in Paris to a $200,000 cash delivery for Aristotle Onassis, to sending two tiger cubs to the President of Panama. He once produced a pair of elephants to appear at a political rally for an anonymous client.

== Later years ==
Zanders retired and sold his business in 1985. According to Zanders' widow and daughter, he penned an autobiography a few years before suffering a debilitating stroke in 1993. They claimed the manuscript, which contained anecdotes from driving Nixon and other clients, was stolen from their Harlem home before any publisher could read it. Zanders also was survived by a brother, Ralph, who worked in the Zanders company.

When Zanders died in 1995, his New York Newsday obituary was bylined Gay Talese.
