= Munnycat =

Indie pop duo

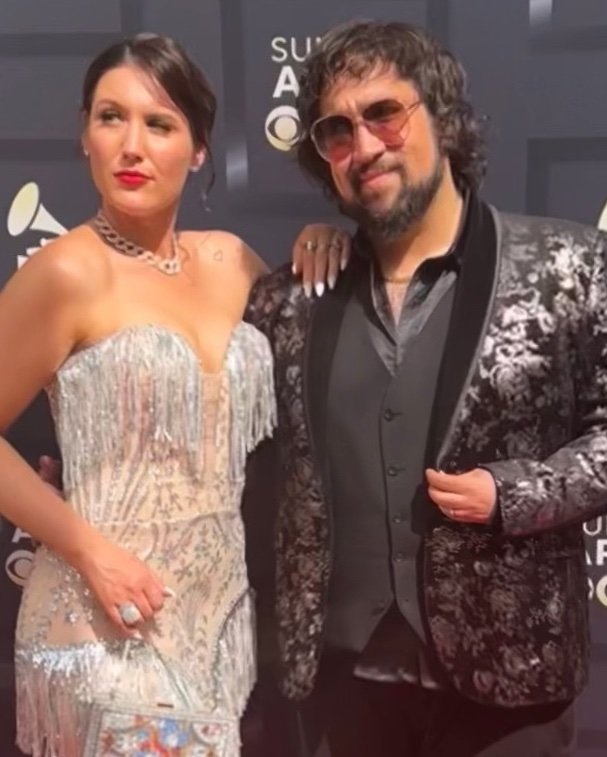
- Munnycat at the Grammy Awards in Las Vegas, NV on April 3rd, 2022.

Background information
- Origin: Los Angeles, California, U.S.
- Genres: noise pop, indietronica, hip hop, indie pop, breakbeat
- Years active: 2016-present
- Members: K808; Khaledzou
- Website: www.munnycat.com

Munnycat (MUNNYCAT) is an American Indie pop duo from Los Angeles formed in 2016. The band consists of Katianne Timko, nicknamed "K808", and Khaled Tabbara, nicknamed "Khaledzou". Timko and Tabbara are responsible for vocals and production and often add musicians at their live shows. The band defines their genre as noise pop and takes a DIY approach to their music.

The band is perhaps best known for their success in commercial syncs. Their music has been placed over 100 times by companies like EA Sports’ FIFA 19, New Balance, Wendy's, eBay, Xbox, JCPenney and Target.

== History ==
Timko and Tabbara first met in Youngstown, Ohio, in 2011 after Timko booked Tabbara's band to perform at a St. Patrick’s Day event. The two began dating later that year, and joined each other's musical projects soon after. They moved to Los Angeles in 2016, where they formed Munnycat. They currently reside in Studio City, LA.

Munnycat released an EP entitled Platinum Gold in April 2017. They release singles on a regular basis, including "don’t stop (drip drip drop)" in March 2019, which made it to #1 on Hype Machine and landed at #4 for the week of April 1–7. Their song "Platinum Gold" was featured in Coca-Cola's first advertising campaign for AHA sparkling water, which launched in March 2020. On July 25, 2021, they released "so fresh" from their upcoming mixtape titled "the MUNNYCAT mixtape" which was released on August 25, 2021.

== Discography ==
- 2021: so fresh
- 2020: Howya Like Me Now?
- 2020: FULL BRONTO
- 2019: MILLIONAIRE (jz + bncé)
- 2019: don't stop (drip drip drop)
- 2019: Go-Go A-Go-Go
- 2018: Check It
- 2018: Piranha
- 2018: Level Up! (La Da Di)
- 2018: You + Me
- 2018: BOOM!

=== the MUNNYCAT mixtape (2021) ===
- "unshaken in the final moment of chaos"
- "eyes on this"
- "do yer own thing (please)"
- "easy"
- "khaledzou is president"
- "so fresh"
- "here it isss"

=== Platinum Gold EP (2017) ===
- "Platinum Gold"
- "Just Watch Me"
- "Feelin Alive"
- "Make a Move"
- "Tonight"
