= Lawrence Kestenbaum =

American lawyer (born 1955)

Washtenaw County Clerk Register of Deeds
- Incumbent
- Assumed office 2004
- Preceded by: Peggy M. Haines

County Commissioner of Washtenaw County
- In office 2000–2002

County Commissioner of Ingham County
- In office 1983–1988

Personal details
- Born: September 13, 1955 (age 70) Chicago, Illinois
- Party: Democratic
- Spouse: Janice Gutfreund
- Children: 1
- Education: East Lansing High School; Cornell University
- Alma mater: Michigan State University (BA); Wayne State University (JD)
- Occupation: Politician
- Known for: The Political Graveyard
- Website: Kestenbaum's personal website

Lawrence Kestenbaum (born September 13, 1955) is an attorney, politician, and the creator and webmaster of The Political Graveyard website.

== Early life and education ==
Although he was born in Chicago, Illinois, Kestenbaum was raised in East Lansing, Michigan, where his father, Justin L. Kestenbaum, was a professor of history at Michigan State University.

In 1973, he graduated from East Lansing High School. He received a bachelor's degree in economics from Michigan State University, followed by a Juris Doctor from Wayne State University in 1982. He later studied historic preservation at Cornell University.

== Academic career ==
Kestenbaum was an analyst and computer lab director for Michigan State University, later becoming an academic specialist there. It was during this time that he created The Political Graveyard in 1996. He was later on staff at the University of Michigan's Institute for Social Research (ISR) Survey Research Center, and has taught historic preservation law at Eastern Michigan University.

== Political career ==
Kestenbaum is a Democrat. He served as a county commissioner in Ingham County, Michigan (1983–88) and Washtenaw County, Michigan (2000–02). In 2004, he was elected as the Washtenaw County Clerk/Register of Deeds, the first Democrat in that position in 72 years. He was unopposed for reelection in 2008, reelected in 2012, unopposed in 2016, and reelected in 2020 and 2024.

Kestenbaum currently serves as co-chair of the Legislative Committee for the Michigan Association of County Clerks.

On March 22, 2014, following a U.S. District Court ruling that Michigan's ban on same sex marriage was unconstitutional, Kestenbaum was one of four Michigan county clerks to open for special hours while the ruling was in effect; his office issued marriage licenses to 74 gay and lesbian couples. His office also provided fresh same-day same-sex marriage licenses within minutes of the US Supreme Court Obergefell ruling.

== Personal life ==
Kestenbaum was married to Janice Gutfreund, and they have one child. He and his former wife were active members in Reform Judaism Temple Beth Emeth in Ann Arbor, Michigan. He continues to be an active member of science fiction fandom, appearing on panels at conventions such as ConFusion.
