= William J. Carney =

American politician

William J. Carney (January 27, 1927 – April 1, 2010) was a U.S. Navy signalman and a multiple-term member of the Ohio General Assembly.

Born in Youngstown, Ohio, Carney graduated from South High School. and served in the United States Navy as a signalman in World War II and the Korean War. After the war he was elected as a member of the Ohio General Assembly, serving as the Democratic representative for Trumbull County in 1959–60, 1961–62, and 1965-66. In February 2005 Carney and his wife, Joanne, were honored by Ohio Governor Bob Taft for service to the community; the previous October Carney had been selected to greet President George W. Bush and his wife Laura during a Mahoning Valley visit in October 2004.
