= Certification for Sustainable Transportation =

Program at the University of Vermont

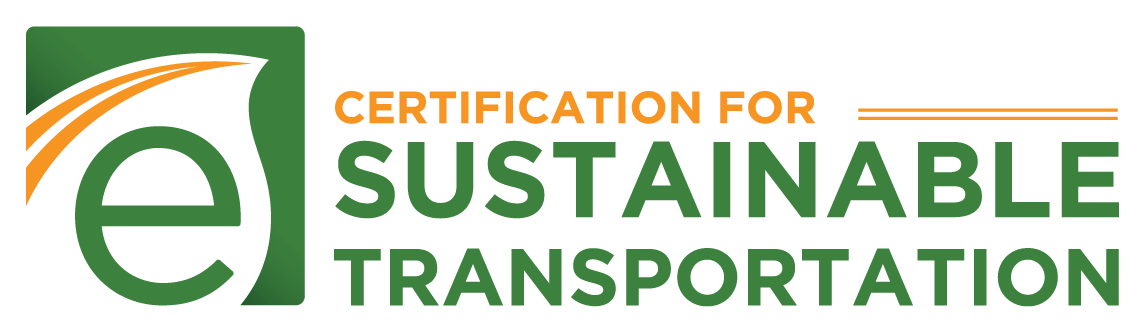
The CST logo

The Certification for Sustainable Transportation is a national program housed at the University of Vermont Extension that seeks to promote the practice of using energy efficient modes of transportation. The CST work centers on its eRating vehicle certification program, which is an eco-label for passenger transportation vehicles. The eRating uses a sustainability index which includes factors such as green house gas emissions per passenger mile, emission levels of criteria pollutants, and in certain circumstances factors such as training for drivers and use of endorsed carbon offsets. Once a certain threshold is met, vehicles may qualify for e1, e2, e3, or e4 levels in the certification program.

Other key components of the CST's work are online and in person training programs. The CST offers training programs geared to help drivers and organizations eliminate all unnecessary idling and on eco-driving. These training programs are focused on helping reduce environmental impacts, save fuel, and save money.

The CST is now actively working with companies in 48 states and three Canadian provinces to prevent unnecessary emissions, reduce environmental impact, and decrease consumption of fossil fuels.

This program is not to be confused with the "E-Mark" vehicle equipment safety certification promulgated by the European Union since 2002 under EU Directive 72/245/EEC and amendments to the requirements of Directive 95/54/EC.

== History ==
In 2007, the University of Vermont began the Green Coach Certification research project, which sought to investigate what efficiency standards would be best applied to motor coaches to promote greater energy sustainability. Research was conducted on actual motor coach companies. It also researched whether a certification program could help reduce environmental impacts from the motor coach industry by educating operators and executives about the benefits, both financial and environmental, of adopting fuel saving strategies and switching to alternative sources of fuel. Upon completion of this pilot program the Certification for Sustainable Transportation was founded as a way to expand the size and scope of the initial program. The CST now works well beyond the motor coach industry, deploying its driver training programs to taxi drivers and school bus operators, and offering its eRating certification to vehicle manufacturers, public transportation industries, and pedi-cab operators.

=== Accomplishments ===
The CST has partnered with several leading motor coach companies, including Megabus and Academy The CST also works with the American Bus Association and the United Motorcoach Association to assist with each organization's Green Operator Awards.

== Certification ==
An individual or organization may submit an application to be certified by the CST. If the application meets the proper criteria, the vehicle being examined is given a score. If that score exceeds a certain threshold, an eRating is given. Areas that are rated include greenhouse gas emissions per passenger mile, the use of low emissions technology, the use of alternative fuels, purchase of carbon offset, participation in CST training programs, and the energy efficiency of other places associated with the company, such as the home office.

The CST gives eRatings on a vehicle basis. There are four levels of certification ranging from e1 to e4. e1 is the lowest level of certification and means that the vehicle has met the requirements satisfactorily, whereas e4 certification means that the vehicle is at the highest level of energy efficiency.

== Training programs ==
The Certification for Sustainable Transportation offers two training programs to teach drivers how to be more fuel efficient.

=== Idle Free ===
This course teaches drivers about the inefficiency of idling, leaving a bus running while it is not driving, and shows them when they should idle and when they should not. Completing this course gives a driver more points towards a higher eRating. The CST uses a unique approach in this training concentrating on helping dispel myths about idling and helping individual drivers find and identify reasons they personally would like to go idle free. The CST worked with drivers around the country to design this program with the intent of having it come across as drivers speaking to other drivers.

=== Eco-Driving 101 ===
This course teaches drivers techniques that they can use to cut their fuel consumption on the road, as well as operate their vehicles more safely. Completing this course also gives a driver more points towards a higher eRating.
