= Jay Williams (politician) =

American politician

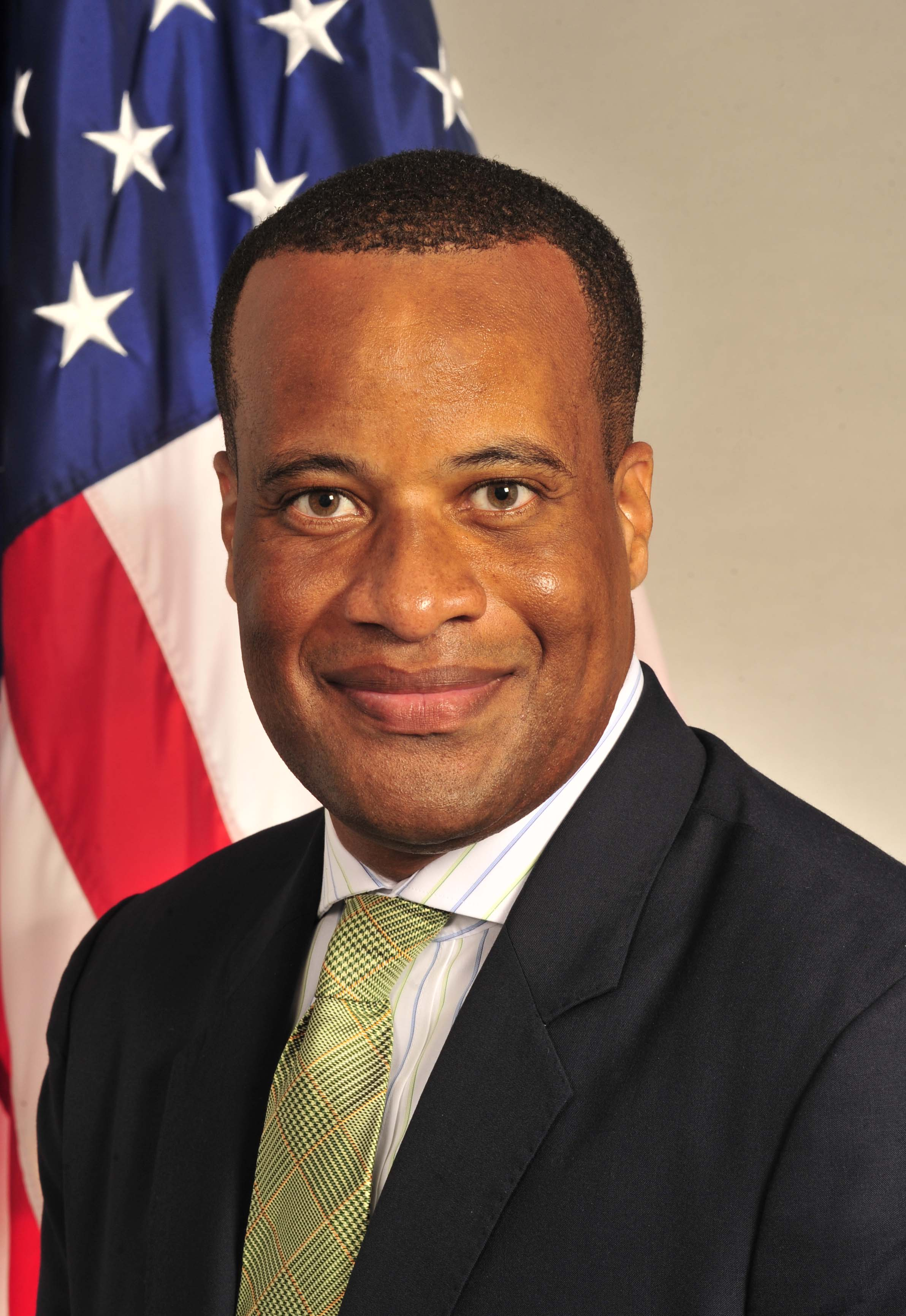

Assistant Secretary of Commerce for Economic Development
- In office May 20, 2014 – January 20, 2017
- President: Barack Obama
- Preceded by: John Fernandez
- Succeeded by: John Fleming

47th Mayor of Youngstown
- In office 2005–2011
- Preceded by: George McKelvey
- Succeeded by: Charles Sammarone

Personal details
- Born: Roy Kojo Jawara Williams; September 26, 1971 (age 54) Youngstown, Ohio
- Party: Democratic
- Spouse: Sonja
- Children: 1 son
- Education: Youngstown State University (BS)

Roy Kojo Jawara "Jay" Williams (born September 26, 1971) is a United States politician who served as Assistant Secretary of Commerce for Economic Development from 2014 to 2017. Previously, he served as the executive director of the federal Office of Recovery for Auto Communities and Workers and as Mayor of Youngstown, Ohio. Since July 17, 2017, he has served as the president and CEO of the Greater Hartford Gives Foundation, formerly the Hartford Foundation for Public Giving.

== Early life ==
Williams was born and raised on Youngstown's east side. After earning a degree in finance at Youngstown State University, he reportedly turned down job offers from around the country and remained in Youngstown, where he worked with area banks. Williams also served as an examiner for the Federal Reserve Bank of Cleveland.

He eventually left the banking industry to assume directorship of Youngstown's Community Development Agency. There, Williams was instrumental in implementing Youngstown 2010, a citywide redevelopment plan aimed at re-shaping the city and helping to overturn its negative image.

== Mayor of Youngstown ==
Williams, who publicly stated on several occasions that he was a "lifelong Democrat", did not run in the April Democratic primary for mayor. On May 3, 2005, he announced his intention to run for mayor as an independent.

Immediately after declaring his mayoral candidacy, Williams became a major contender for the office, along with Democratic nominee Bob Hagan. Williams had no direct political experience. Nevertheless, Williams ran a popular campaign, and as the election neared, he seemed poised to pull ahead of rival Hagan.

On Election Day, November 8, 2005, Williams swept the field of six candidates to seize victory in Youngstown's mayoral race. Despite earlier evidence of a close race, the result shocked observers who had viewed Williams' relative youth and political inexperience as insurmountable hurdles to winning the election. While the reasons for the outcome remain unclear, some observers have attributed Williams' successful run to widespread dissatisfaction with the city's traditional leadership.

Once elected Mayor, Jay pushed to create a Joint Economic Development District with surrounding townships to better facilitate regional growth. He was a member of the Mayors Against Illegal Guns Coalition, a bi-partisan group with a stated goal of "making the public safer by getting illegal guns off the streets". The Coalition was chaired by New York City Mayor Michael Bloomberg. In 2008, He was a featured speaker at the inaugural Great Lakes ReUse Conference.

His election in 2005 gained local and regional media attention because it brought Youngstown its first African-American mayor as well as its first independent mayor since 1922.

== National government ==
Williams resigned in August 2011 to take a position as the Obama administration's "Auto Czar".

In 2014 Williams became the Assistant Secretary of Commerce for Economic Development; the administrator of the Economic Development Administration. Williams was charged with leading the federal economic development agenda by promoting innovation and competitiveness, and preparing American regions for growth and success in the global economy.

In November 2020, Williams was named a volunteer member of the Joe Biden presidential transition Agency Review Team to support transition efforts related to the United States Department of Treasury.

== See also ==
- List of mayors of Youngstown, Ohio
