= Gil Mantera's Party Dream =

American band

- Gil Mantera and Ultimate Donny

Background information
- Origin: Canfield, Ohio, United States
- Genres: Synthpop, Electronica
- Years active: 1999–2010, 2013
- Labels: Fat Possum Records; Audio Eagle Records; Psychic Dog Records
- Members: Gil Mantera; Ultimate Donny; AE Paterra
- Website: www.partydream.com

Gil Mantera's Party Dream are an American electronic synthpop party band hailing originally from Youngstown, Ohio, United States.

== Biography ==
Gil Mantera's Party Dream spawned from a three-man act called "Party Talk" that played a one night show in August 1998 in Youngstown, Ohio at Cedars Lounge. The act consisted of Richard Elmsworth (Ultimate Donny), Glen Whiteweather (Gil Mantera), and Brian Gage (Tartron). Ultimate Donny described the band as, "A joke band called Party Talk, playing retro '80s-style dance music and pretty much making jackasses of ourselves."

The group disbanded after Brian moved to California. With Gil and Donny, Party Talk regrouped a few months later to play a CD release show at the club, despite the fact they had no CD in the works. With the departure of their third member, Party Talk evolved into Gil Mantera's Party Dream, and the duo gained a reputation for their anything-goes live shows.

== Discography ==
- Best Friends – 2000, self-released CDEP, out of print
- Once Triangular – 2004, self-released CDLP, out of print
- Bloodsongs – 2005, Audio Eagle CDLP
- Ballerina EP – 2008, digital self-release
- Dreamscape – 2009, digital self-release and CDLP; Psychic Dog Records
- Bloodbrothers – TBA, TBA CDLP
