= Cache =

Cache, caching, or caché may refer to:

== Science and technology ==
- Cache (computing), a technique used in computer storage for easier data access
- Cache (biology) or hoarding, a food storing behavior of animals
- Cache (archaeology), artifacts purposely buried in the ground
- InterSystems Caché, a database management system from InterSystems

== Places ==
=== United States ===
- Cache, Idaho, an unincorporated community
- Cache, Illinois, an unincorporated community
- Cache, Oklahoma, a city in Comanche County
- Cache, Utah, Cache County, Utah
- Cache County, Utah
- Cache Peak (Idaho), a mountain in Castle Rocks State Park

=== Other places ===
- Cache, Aosta, a frazione in Italy
- Cache Bay, Ontario, Canada
- Cache Creek (disambiguation)
- Cache River (disambiguation)
- Cache Valley (disambiguation)

== Arts, entertainment and media ==
- Caché (album), a 1993 album by Kirk Whalum
- Caché (film), a 2005 film directed by Michael Haneke

== Commerce ==
- Caché (retailer), a defunct clothing store

== People ==
- Benedikt de Caché (1740–1809), Austrian diplomat

== Other ==
- Trapper's cache, temporary hideout, used by trappers from the north of the American continent
- Geocaching, an outdoor treasure-hunting game which involves looking for containers of varying sizes called geocaches or caches
- "Cache", a Counter-Strike: Global Offensive, Counter-Strike 2 map.

== See also ==
- Cachet, in philately, a design or inscription other than a cancellation or pre-printed postage
- Cash, money in the form of liquid currency
- Supply depot, a form of supply cache that is guarded by security
