= Economy of Youngstown, Ohio =

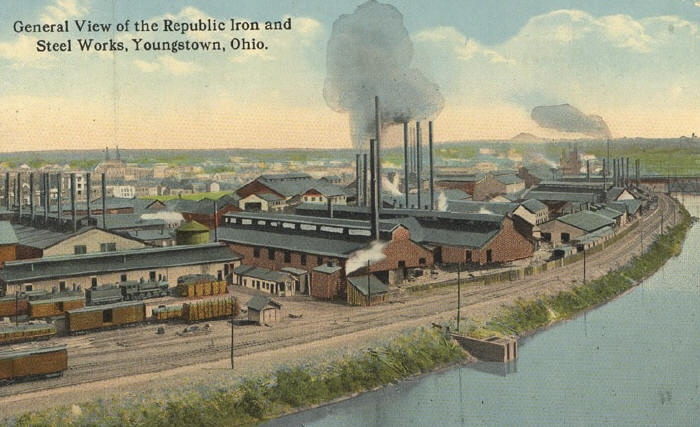
Republic Iron and Steel Works, Youngstown, early 1900s

The economy of Youngstown, Ohio, United States, flourished in the 19th and early 20th centuries, with steel production reaching all-time highs at that time. The steel boom led to an influx of immigrants to the area looking for work, as well as construction of skyscrapers in the area. The city's population peaked at 170,002 in 1930, just at the onset of the Great Depression. World War II also brought a great demand for steel. After World War II, demand for steel dropped off dramatically, and industrial base of Youngstown began to see a decline.

Youngstown's economy has been impacted by a loss of the steel industry jobs which started on September 19, 1977, on what became known to locals as "Black Monday", and continued into the mid-1980s. While the loss of steel industry jobs in the region coincided with the general deindustrialization of Rust Belt cities such as Youngstown as well as the United States as a whole, Youngstown's economic struggles have been well documented. In the Mahoning Valley, where Youngstown is located, the population was halved, while non-industrial businesses were forced to close or relocate due to cascading effects resulting from Youngstown's deindustrialization.

== Steel boom ==
Founded by John Young in 1797 in the Connecticut Western Reserve section of the Northwest Territory, Youngstown spent the first half of the 19th century as a small village, dependent on mostly agricultural needs, until the beginning of the Second Industrial Revolution. The discovery of iron ore along the Mahoning River, however, would make the city a viable and logical place to manufacture steel. The city sits roughly in between Cleveland and Pittsburgh—steel manufacturers in their own right—and halfway between New York City and Chicago. Youngstown Sheet and Tube and Republic Steel were among the region's largest locally owned steel companies, while U.S. Steel also had major operations in the region.

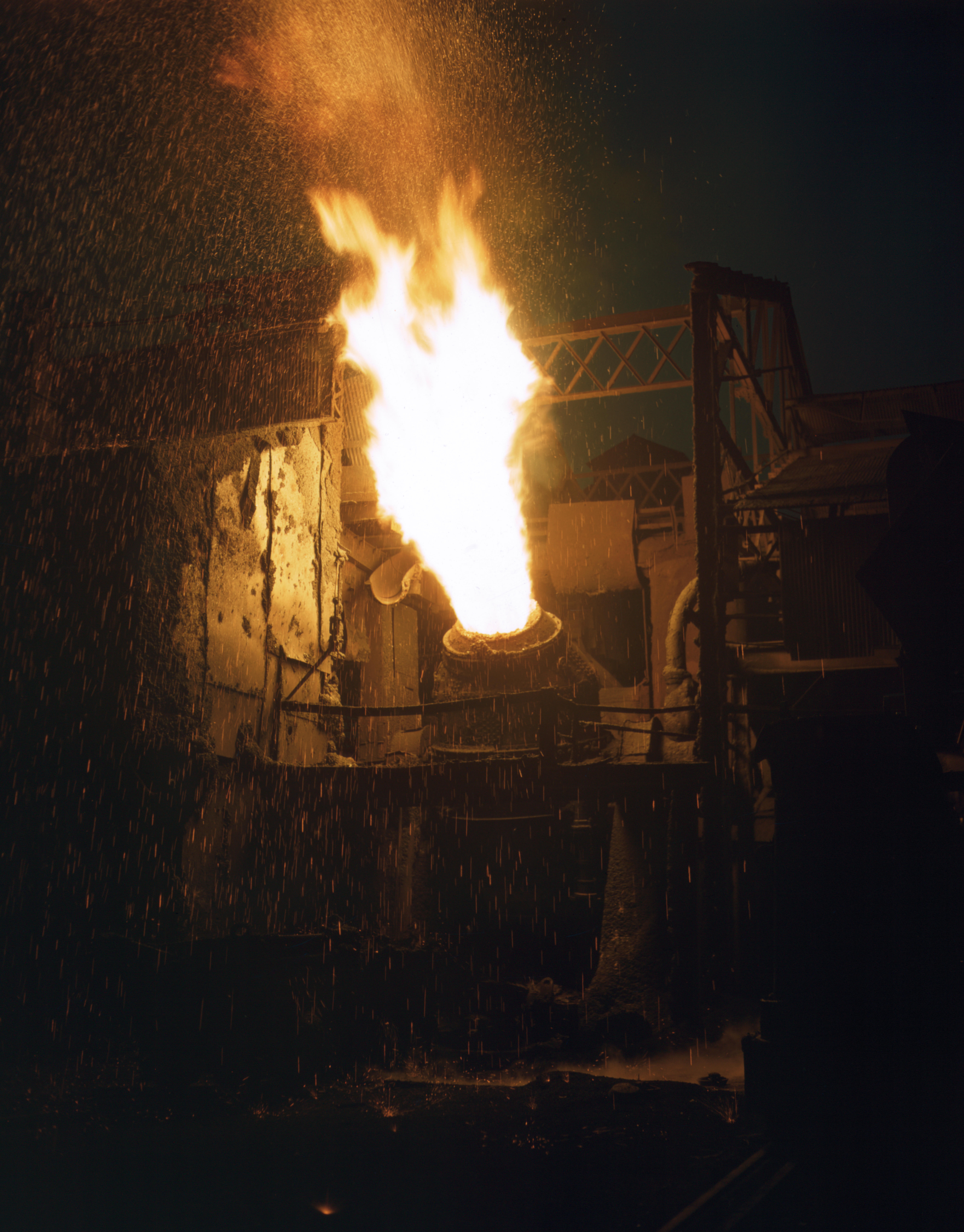
Molten iron is blown in an Eastern Bessemer converter at Republic Steel, Youngstown, November 1941

Endowed with large deposits of coal and iron as well as "old growth" hardwood forests needed to produce charcoal, the Youngstown area eventually developed a thriving steel industry. The area's first blast furnace was established to the east of town in 1803 by James and Daniel Heaton. In time, the availability of fossil fuels contributed to the development of other coal-fired mills, including the Youngstown Rolling Mill Company, which was established in 1846. By the mid-19th century, Youngstown was the site of several iron industrial plants, notably David Tod's Brier Hill Iron & Coal Company. The iron industry continued to expand in the 1890s, despite the depletion of local natural resources. Numerous rail connections ensured a consistent supply of coal and iron ore from neighboring states.

At the turn of the 20th century local industrialists began to convert to steel manufacturing, amid a wave of industrial consolidations that placed much of the Mahoning Valley's industry in the hands of national corporations. Shortly after the establishment of U.S. Steel in 1901, the corporate entity absorbed Youngstown's premier steel producer, the National Steel Company. One year earlier, a group of city investors had taken steps to ensure high levels of local ownership in the area's industrial sector. Led by local industrialists George D. Wick and James A. Campbell, they organized what became the Youngstown Sheet and Tube Company, among the nation's most important regional steel producers. The firm significantly expanded its operations in 1923, when it acquired plants in South Chicago and East Chicago, Indiana. This impulse to support local ownership surfaced again in 1931, when Campbell, as chairman of the Youngstown Sheet and Tube Company, attempted to merge the firm with Bethlehem Steel, in a bid to create the nation's second-largest steel corporation. Other area industrialists blocked the move, with the financial backing of Republic Steel founder Cyrus S. Eaton, who feared the implications of a strengthened Bethlehem Steel.

In the late 1930s the community's steel sector gained national attention once again, when Youngstown became a site of the so-called "Little Steel Strike", an effort by the Steel Workers Organizing Committee, a precursor to United Steelworkers, to secure contract agreements with smaller steel companies. These firms included Republic Steel, Bethlehem Steel, Youngstown Sheet and Tube, National Steel, Inland Steel, and American Rolling Mills. Gus Hall, one of the committee's founding organizers, led strikes in Youngstown and Warren. On June 21, 1937, strike-related violence in Youngstown resulted in two deaths and 42 injuries. Despite violent episodes in Youngstown and Chicago, the Little Steel Strike proved to be a turning point in the history of the U.S. labor movement. Historian William Lawson observed that the strike transformed industrial unions from "basically local and ineffective organizations into all-encompassing, nationwide collective bargaining representatives of American workers".

In 1969 Youngstown Sheet and Tube merged with the New Orleans–based Lykes Corporation, and in 1979 the combined Lykes-Youngstown was bought by the conglomerate LTV. This brought decisions to the local economy out of the hands of the Youngstown area for the first time, although Republic Steel had moved to nearby Cleveland years earlier. LTV had discovered that the numerous mills in the area had not been upgraded in decades, and would not meet pollution regulations set forth by the United States government without an expensive upgrade. In addition, many steel manufacturers were outsourcing steel to developing nations, where the costs would be cheaper and with fewer pollution regulations.

== Black Monday ==
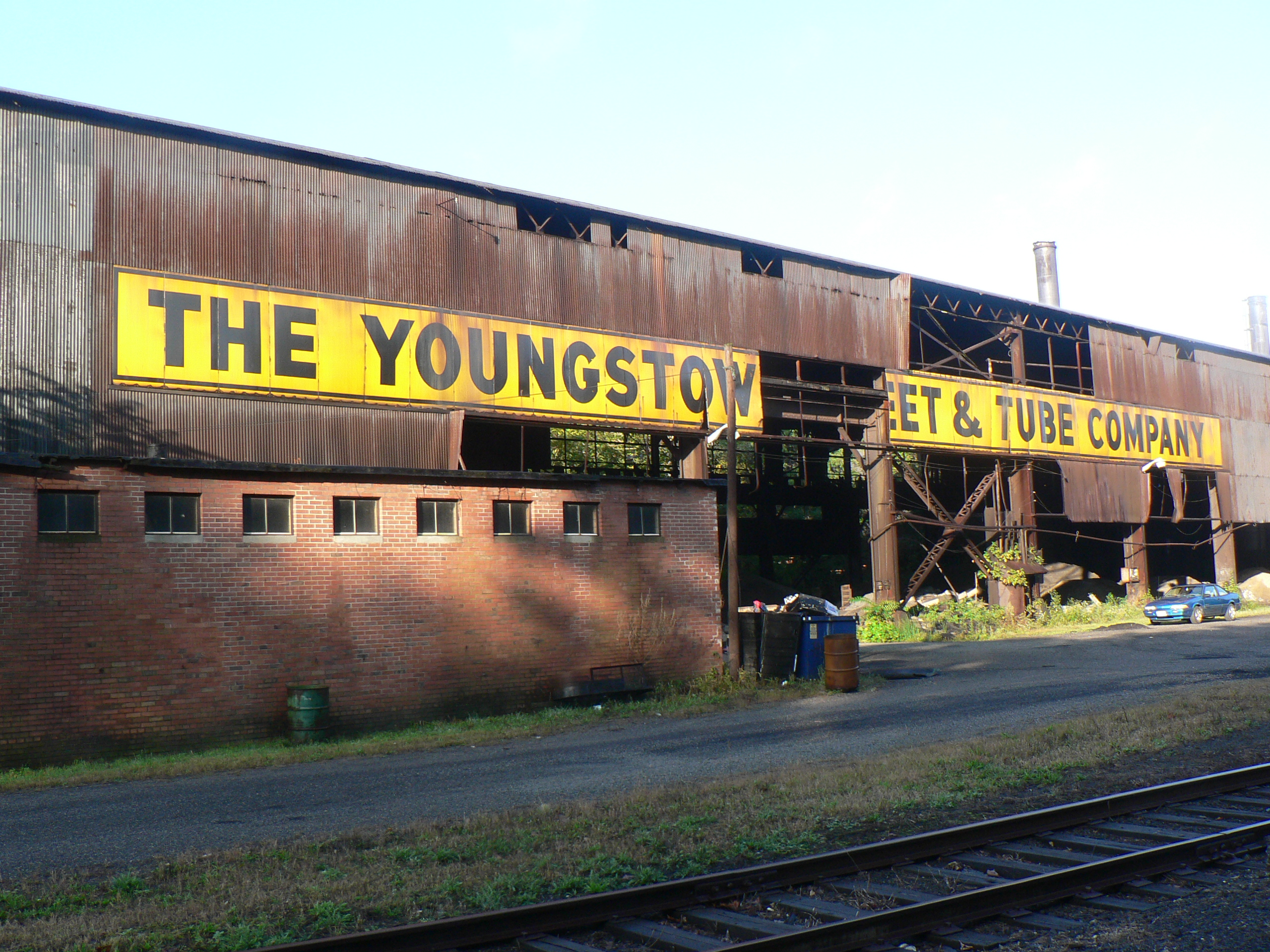
An abandoned facility of the Youngstown Sheet and Tube Company, owner of the Jeanette Blast Furnace. The Furnace is called "Jenny" in the 1995 Bruce Springsteen song "Youngstown", which is about the decline of Youngstown as an industrial city.

Between the 1920s and 1960s the city was known as an important industrial hub that featured the massive furnaces and foundries of such companies as Republic Steel and U.S. Steel. At the same time, Youngstown never became economically diversified, as did larger industrial cities such as Chicago, Pittsburgh, Akron, or Cleveland. Though population levels remained flat for a few more decades, population had not grown since the Great Depression, though General Motors had opened Lordstown Assembly in 1966 to help offset some losses. Hence, when economic changes forced the closure of plants throughout the 1970s, the city was left with few substantial economic alternatives. The 1969 corporate merger between the Youngstown Sheet and Tube Company and the New Orleans–based Lykes Corporation proved to be a turning point in the demise of the local steel industry. The merger and subsequent takeover of Youngstown Sheet and Tube burdened the community's primary steel producer with hundreds of thousands of dollars in debt. Further, the deal placed control of the company outside of the Mahoning Valley.

On September 19, 1977, it was announced a large portion of Youngstown Sheet and Tube would be closing. Although federal laws now require employers to give 60 days notice to its employees if they plan on doing mass layoffs, the Worker Adjustment and Retraining Notification Act was still eleven years from going into effect at the time, and Youngstown Sheet and Tube instantly put 5,000 workers out of work. The day is still known locally as "Black Monday".

Youngstown Sheet and Tube's announcement had a ripple effect in the area. In 1979–1980, U.S. Steel pulled out of the Youngstown area and started scaling back its operations in Pittsburgh before eventually merging with Marathon Oil and filing with bankruptcy. In the mid-1980s, Republic Steel also filed for bankruptcy. Attempts to revive the local steel industry proved unsuccessful. Shortly after the closure of most of Youngstown Sheet and Tube's area operations, local religious leaders, steelworkers, and activists such as Staughton Lynd participated in a grassroots effort to purchase and refurbish one of the company's abandoned plants in neighboring Campbell, Ohio. This project met with failure in April 1979. Youngstown State University professors Terry Buss and F. Stevens Redburn have concluded that the mill closings resulted from forces beyond the control of the community. Youngstown was simply just one piece of a national problem, and the area could not solve this problem alone. In 1982, Staughton Lynd wrote about the effects of the mill closings in Youngstown in the book, The Fight Against Black Monday. In the wake of the steel plant shutdowns, the community lost an estimated 40,000 manufacturing jobs, 400 satellite businesses, $414 million in personal income, and from 33 to 75 percent of the school tax revenues. The Youngstown area has yet to fully recover from the loss of jobs in the steel sector.

The move had an effect on non-industrial businesses as well. Fast food chain Arby's, which at the time was beginning to make a national push, moved its corporate headquarters out of the Youngstown area. Idora Park, an amusement park in the area, suffered several fires before closing its doors in 1984. The Strouss department store would be consolidated into Kaufmann's by its parent company, May Department Stores, before its own consolidation into Macy's.

The city made attempts to attract another steel manufacturer, and even re-open Youngstown Sheet and Tube as a community-owned steel mill, but all these attempts failed.

== After Black Monday ==
The loss of industrial jobs has had a lasting impact in the Mahoning Valley region of Youngstown, as the city's population was cut in half as a result, while non-industrial businesses were forced to close or relocate due to the ripple effect of the loss of the steel industry. Although some other Rust Belt cities such as Pittsburgh have since successfully been able to diversify their economic base, as of December 2010, more than a generation after deindustrialization, Youngstown has not recovered. The deindustrialization of Youngstown has been well documented.

=== Alternate enterprises ===
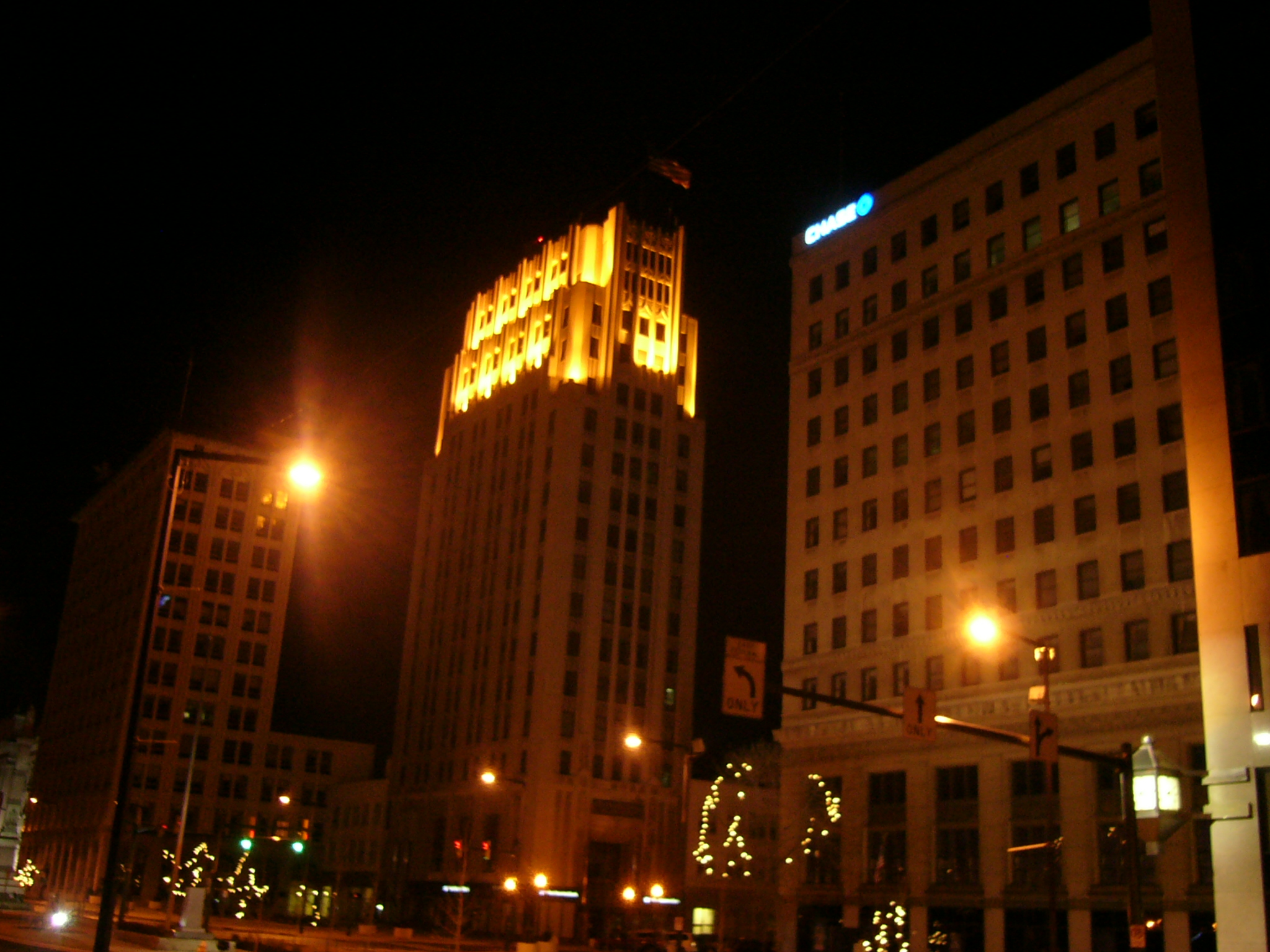
Downtown Youngstown at night

A number of products and enterprises other than steel introduced in Youngstown during the manufacturing era became national household names. Among these is Youngstown-based Schwebel's Bakery, which was established in neighboring Campbell in the 20th century. The company now distributes bread products nationally. In the 1920s, Youngstown was the birthplace of the Good Humor brand of ice cream novelties, and the popular franchise of Handel's Homemade Ice Cream & Yogurt was established there in the 1940s. In the 1950s, the suburb of Boardman became the site of one of the country's first modern shopping plazas, which was established by Youngstown-born developer Edward J. DeBartolo, Sr. The fast-food chain, Arby's, opened the first of its restaurants in Boardman in 1964, and Arthur Treacher's Fish & Chips was headquartered in Youngstown in the late 1970s. More recently, the city's downtown hosted the corporate headquarters of the now-defunct pharmacy chain store Phar-Mor, which was established by Youngstown native Mickey Monus.

The blow dealt to the community's industrial economy in the 1970s had been slightly mitigated by the presence of auto production plants in the metropolitan area. In the late 1980s, the Avanti, an automobile with a fiberglass body originally designed by Studebaker to compete with the Corvette, was manufactured in an industrial complex on Youngstown's Albert Street. This company moved away after just a few years. A mainstay, though, of Youngstown's industrial economy has long been the GM Lordstown plant. The General Motors' Lordstown Assembly plant was the largest industrial employer in the area. One of the nation's largest auto plants in terms of square feet, the Lordstown facility was home to production of the Chevrolet Impala, Vega, and Cavalier. It was expanded and retooled with a new paint facility and in the 2010s produced the Cavalier's successor, the Chevrolet Cruze.

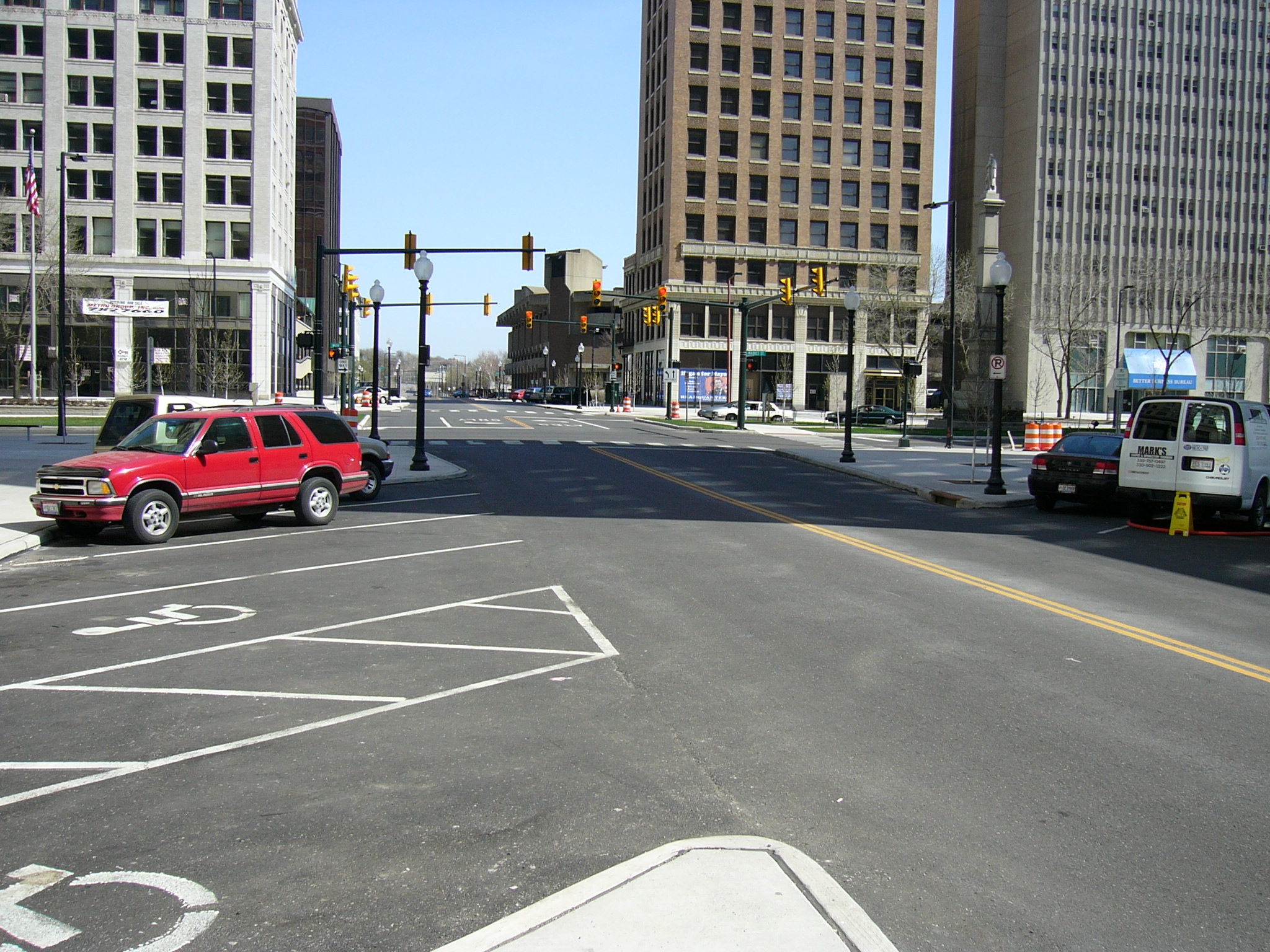
The re-opened Federal Street

Several times, General Motors has announced intentions to close Lordstown Assembly, especially after its 2009 bankruptcy, with the plant's final closure coming on March 6, 2019. Currently, Youngstown State University is the area's largest overall employer, a far cry from the city's industrial past. Even though the area was embarrassed by the collapse of the Phar-Mor chain, Entrepreneur named Youngstown one of the top 10 cities to start a business in 2009.

Downtown Youngstown has seen modest levels of new construction. Recent additions include the George Voinovich Government Center and state and federal courthouses: the Seventh District Court of Appeals and the Nathaniel R. Jones Federal Building and U.S. Courthouse. The latter features an award-winning design by the architectural firm, Robert A. M. Stern Architects. Youngstown's downtown has experienced some business growth. The Youngstown business incubator is located downtown. This nonprofit organization, based in a former department store building, fosters the growth of fledgling technology-based companies. With more than a dozen business tenants, has recently completed construction on the Taft Technology Center, where some of its largest tenants will locate their offices. and houses several start-up technology companies, which have received office space, furnishings, and access to utilities. Some companies supported by the incubator have earned recognition, and a few are starting to outgrow their current space. One such company – Turning Technologies – was in 2007 rated by Inc. Magazine as the fastest-growing privately held software company in the United States and 18th fastest-growing privately held company overall. In an effort to retain companies downtown, the incubator secured approval to demolish a row of vacant buildings nearby to clear space for expansion. The project will be funded by a $2 million federal grant awarded in 2006. In 2005, Federal Street, a major downtown thoroughfare that was closed to create a pedestrian-oriented plaza, was reopened to through traffic. The downtown area has also seen the razing of structurally unsound buildings and the expansion or restoration of others. New construction has dovetailed with efforts to cultivate business growth.

Reversing the trend, in 2010, Vallourec & Mannesman broke ground for a $620 million-dollar pipe mill north of its existing business V&M Star. Production of steel pipes began in October 2012. Opened in 2012, the facility is 1 million square feet (93,000 m^{2}) in area and produces tube goods to service natural gas exploration in the Marcellus Formation and has been an employer for 350 people.

=== Remaining steel operations ===
Youngstown is the site of several steel and metalworking operations, though nothing on the scale seen during the "glory days" of the "Steel Valley". The largest employer in the city is Youngstown State University (YSU), an urban public campus that serves about 15,000 students, located just north of downtown.

The largest industrial employers within the Youngstown city limits are Vallourec Star Steel Company (formerly North Star Steel), in the Brier Hill district, and Exal Corporation on Poland Avenue. The latter has recently expanded its operations.

=== Defunct retail and amusement sectors ===
Several of the city's recreational resources disappeared amid the economic hardships that began in the late 1970s. Among these was Idora Park, an amusement park that served as a convenient alternative for residents who preferred not to travel to larger parks in Northern Ohio and Western Pennsylvania. (These included Conneaut Lake Park in Conneaut Lake, Pennsylvania, Geauga Lake in Aurora, Ohio, Cedar Point in Sandusky, Ohio, and Kennywood in Pittsburgh, Pennsylvania.) The park, which closed in 1984, held sentimental value for many local residents and enjoyed a degree of historical significance. Former Youngstown resident Jack L. Warner noted in his autobiography that the Warner brothers took their first step into the movie business when they screened a used copy of The Great Train Robbery at Idora Park and other local venues.

From the early 20th century to the mid-1970s, Youngstown was the retail center of the Mahoning Valley. There were two flagship department stores in the downtown area, including Strouss Hirshberg's (later absorbed by Kaufmann's, now part of Macy's) and McKelvey's (later Higbee's, now part of Dillard's). Specialty shops lined the main artery of West Federal Street, and the district had four upscale movie theaters, including the Palace Theater, the Warner Brothers' first Theater, the State Theater, and the Paramount Theater. These businesses were the first to close as a result of declining attendance in the 1950s, 1960s, and 1970s. In the early 1970s, the appearance of two suburban malls (the Southern Park Mall, in Boardman, and the Eastwood Mall, in Niles) hastened the closure or relocation of many businesses that remained. The collapse of the community's steel industry at the end of the decade created additional challenges for downtown business owners, and throughout the 1980s and 1990s, efforts to revive the former retail hub were unsuccessful.

== "Youngstown 2010" project ==
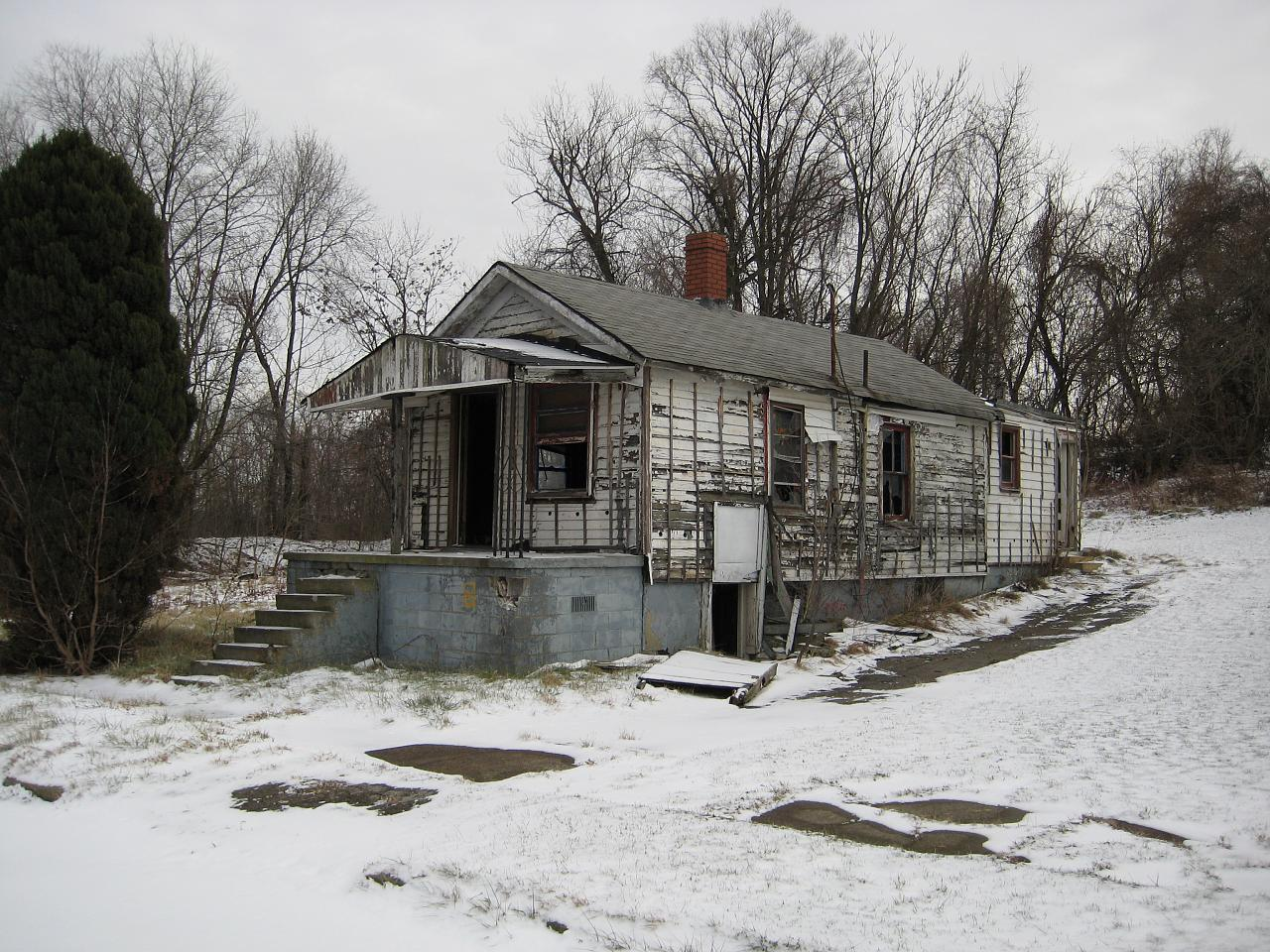
Dilapidated house in Youngstown, 2009

In the 2000s, residents and city planners became motivated to change the city's course, eventually producing the "Youngstown 2010" project. This project is also colloquially referred to as "The Greening of Youngstown" due to the large scale demolition of dilapidated structures in favor of green space and the expansion of public parks.

"The City of Youngstown is operating under a comprehensive plan that was formulated over a four year period in the early 1950s. The plan was reviewed and updated with two additional volumes in 1974. These plans were for a different era that anticipated a population of between 200,000 and 250,000. The Youngstown 2010 Plan is based on a new vision for the new reality that accepts we are a smaller city that will stabilize at 80,000 people."

Major Vision Principles of Youngstown 2010 include:

1. Accepting that Youngstown is a smaller city.
  The dramatic collapse of the steel industry led to the loss of tens of thousands of jobs and a precipitous decline in population. Having lost more than half its population and almost its entire industrial base in the last 30 years, the city is now left with an oversized urban structure. (It has been described as a size 40-man wearing a size 60 suit.) There are too many abandoned properties and too many underused sites. Many difficult choices will have to be made as Youngstown recreates itself as a sustainable mid-sized city. A strategic program is required to rationalize and consolidate the urban infrastructure in a socially responsible and financially sustainable manner.
2. Defining Youngstown's role in the new regional economy.
  The steel industry no longer dominates Youngstown's economy. Most people work in different industries today. The city must align itself with the present realities of the regional economy. This new positioning means support for a more diverse and vibrant economy founded on the current strengths within the city and region, such as the university, the health care sector, and the arts community.
3. Improving Youngstown's image and enhancing quality of life.
  Youngstown must become a healthier and better place to live and work. Over time people have grown accustomed to seeing rundown buildings and streets. Urban decay is a constant and demoralizing reminder of Youngstown's decline. It is important that Youngstown begin to "fix its broken windows" and support initiatives to improve neighborhoods, the downtown, the river, and the education system. The city must also begin dealing with difficult issues such as public safety and racism.
4. A call to action
  The people of Youngstown are ready for change. The city already has a large number of local leaders who want to involve others and make a contribution. The citywide plan must ensure that the excitement and optimism fostered through the planning process is maintained and advanced. To that end, the city needs a practical, action-oriented plan and a process through which local leaders can continue to be empowered and the city's successes constantly celebrated.

Besides embracing downsizing and green space expansion, the plan focuses strongly on attracting more diverse businesses. This has resulted in the city gaining international recognition for addressing the negative consequences of deindustrialization, which are common across the world.

== See also ==
- Decline of Detroit
- Deindustrialization
- Rust Belt
- Steel crisis
- Steel Valley (Ohio-Pennsylvania)
- Urban decay

== Sources ==
- Akpadock, Frank (2012). City in transition: strategies for economic regeneration of inner-city communities : the case of Youngstown, Ohio. Victoria, BC: FriesenPress. ISBN 9781770972568.
- Aley, Howard C. (1975). A Heritage to Share: The Bicentennial History of Youngstown and the Mahoning Valley. Youngstown, OH: The Bicentennial Commission of Youngstown and Mahoning County, Ohio.
- Blue, Frederick J.; Jenkins, William D.; Lawson, William H.; Reedy, Joan M. (1995). Mahoning Memories: A History of Youngstown and Mahoning County. Virginia Beach, VA: The Donning Company. ISBN 0-89865-944-2.
- Bluestone, Barry (1982). The deindustrialization of America: plant closings, community abandonment, and the dismantling of basic industry. New York: Basic Books. ISBN 0465015905.
- Brody, David (1960). Steelworkers in America. Cambridge, Massachusetts: Harvard University Press.
- Bruno, Robert (1999). Steelworker Alley: How Class Works in Youngstown. Ithaca, NY: Cornell University Press. ISBN 0-8014-3439-4.
- Fuechtmann, Thomas G. (1989). Steeples and Stacks: Religion and Steel Crisis in Youngstown. New York: Cambridge University Press. ISBN 0-521-33481-0.
- Jenkins, William D. (1990). Steel Valley Klan: The Ku Klux Klan in Ohio's Mahoning Valley. Kent, OH: Kent State University Press. ISBN 0-87338-415-6.
- Knepper, George W. (1989). Ohio and Its People. Kent, OH: Kent State University Press. ISBN 0-87338-377-X.
- Lemann, Nicholas (1991). The Promised Land: The Great Black Migration and How It Changed America. New York: Vintage Books. ISBN 0-679-73347-7.
- Linkon, Sherry Lee; John Russo (2002). Steeltown U.S.A: work and memory in Youngstown. Lawrence, Kan.: University Press of Kansas. ISBN 9780700611614.
- Russo, John; Linkon, Sherry Lee (2003). "Collateral Damage: Deindustrialization and the Uses of Youngstown". In Cowie, Jefferson R.; Heathcott, Joseph (eds.). Beyond the Ruins: The Meanings of Deindustrialization. Cornell University Press. ISBN 0-8014-8871-0.
- Safford, Sean (2009). Why the garden club couldn't save Youngstown: the transformation of the Rust Belt. Cambridge, Mass: Harvard University Press. ISBN 9780674031760.
- Scarsella, Richard S. Memories and Melancholy: Reflections on the Mahoning Valley and Youngstown, Ohio. New York: iUniverse, 2005.
- Warner, Jack L. (1964). My First Hundred Years in Hollywood. New York: Random House.
