= Cache Creek =

Cache Creek may refer to:

- Cache Creek (British Columbia), a stream in the Thompson Country of British Columbia, Canada
- Cache Creek, British Columbia, a town in British Columbia, Canada, named after the creek
- Cache Creek (Kern County, California), a stream in Kern County, California, United States
- Cache Creek (Oklahoma), a stream in Southwestern Oklahoma, United States
- Cache Creek (Mokelumne River), a Sierra Nevada tributary of the North Fork Mokelumne River, California, United States
- Cache Creek (Sacramento River), a tributary stream in Yolo, Colusa, and Lake Counties, California, United States
- Cache Creek Casino Resort, is a casino resort located in Brooks, California
- The Yentna-Cache Creek mining district is a placer gold mining region in the Matanuska-Susitna borough of Alaska, United States

== See also ==
- Cache River (disambiguation)
- Cache Valley (disambiguation)
