= Bath & Body Works =

American retailer

Bath and Body Works, LLC.

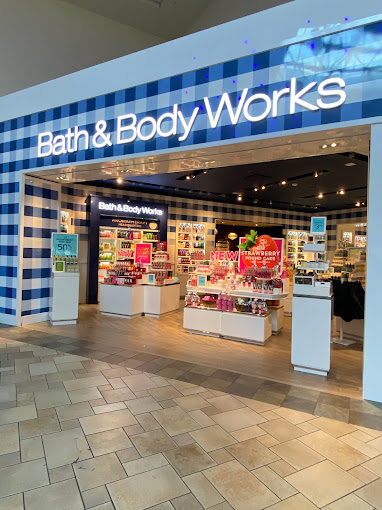
- Bath & Body Works located inside Southern Park Mall
- Type: Subsidiary
- Industry: Retail
- Founded: 1990; 36 years ago, in New Albany, Ohio, U.S.
- Headquarters: Columbus, Ohio, U.S.
- Number of locations: 2,533 (2026)
- Area served: Argentina • Brazil • Chile • Czech Republic • El Salvador • Indonesia • Macau • Panama • Poland • Singapore • UAE • Vietnam • Australia • Colombia • Dominican Republic • Guatemala • Italy • Malaysia • Paraguay • Qatar • South Korea • United Kingdom • Bahrain • Costa Rica • Ecuador • Hong Kong • Jordan • Mexico • Peru • Romania • Thailand • Uruguay • Canada • Curaçao • Egypt • India • Kuwait • Oman • Philippines • Saudi Arabia • Turkey • Venezuela
- Products: Bath, lotions, fragrance, sanitary items, and candles
- Parent: Bath & Body Works, Inc.
- Website: www.bathandbodyworks.com

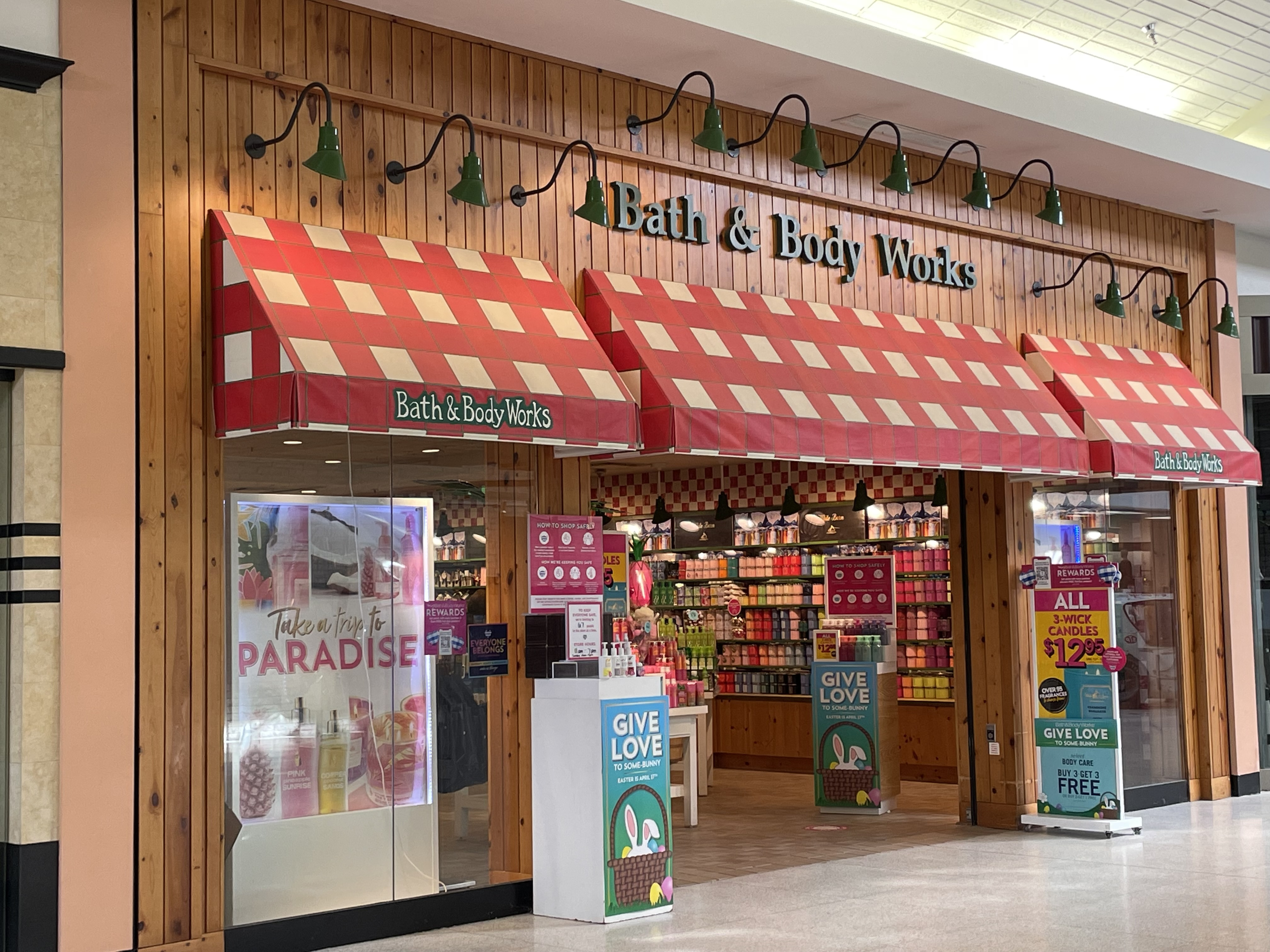
A vintage Bath & Body Works store, similar to the first locations opened, at Shenango Valley Mall

Bath & Body Works, LLC. is an American retail store chain that sells soaps, lotions, fragrances, candles, accessories, and hand sanitizers. It was founded in 1990 in New Albany, Ohio, and has since expanded across six continents. In 1997, it became the largest bath shop chain in the United States.

== History ==
Bath & Body Works was founded in 1990 in New Albany, Ohio, as the beauty line for Express, Inc. The company's first store opened in a Cambridge, Massachusetts, mall in September 1990. In 1991, the Body Shop sued Bath & Body Works, resulting in Bath & Body Works rebranding. The brand created a mascot named Kate who serves as a founding figure, with the store layout being modeled as her country house. In 1997, a secondary brand known as Bath & Body Works at Home was launched. Two years later, the company launched the White Barn Candle Company, a division specializing in the sale of scented candles.

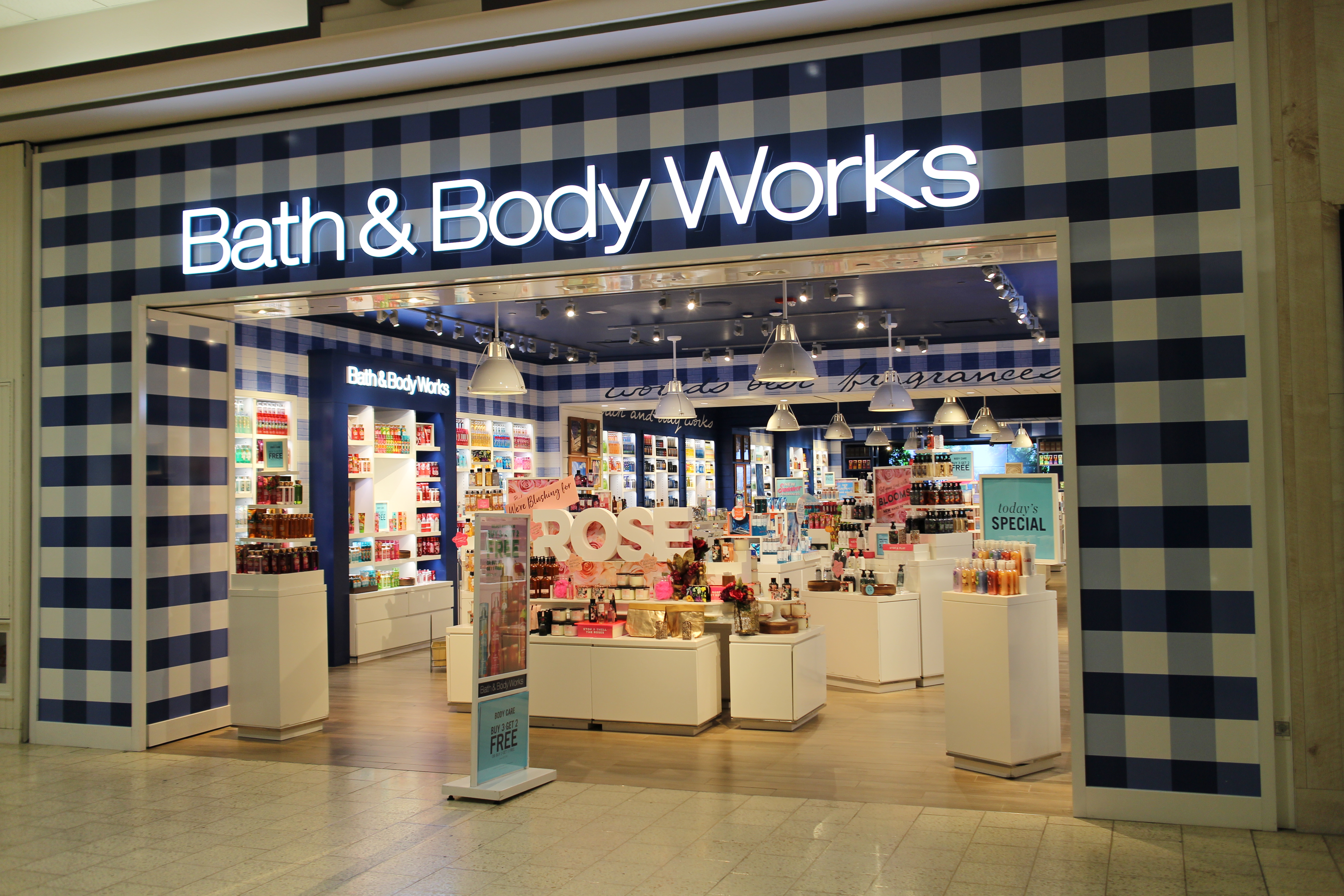
A Bath & Body Works at Uptown Rapid (formerly Rushmore Mall) in Rapid City, South Dakota

Bath & Body Works launched both a seasonal catalog and a website in 2006. In November 2006, the company launched its first television commercial advertisement. Net sales as of January 28, 2006 were $2.3 billion, significantly higher than all other L Brands companies other than Victoria's Secret.

In July 2008, the company announced that it was opening six locations in Canada. With the company acquiring Canadian-based La Senza, they felt it was the opportunity to move into a growing Canadian market, with the Body Shop being its main competition.

As of August 1, 2026 Bath & Body Works operates 1,937 stores and has 596 additional partner-operated stores. In October 2010, it opened its first stores outside of North America in Kuwait, by the franchise giant M. H. Alshaya Co. The company often recycles scents; discontinuing a scent and renaming it with a fresh new look.

Its fragrances have included Cucumber Melon, introduced in 1998, which was inducted into the Fragrance Foundation's Hall of Fame in 2018.
