= Cache River =

Cache River may refer to:

- Cache River (Arkansas)
  - Cache River National Wildlife Refuge, a protected area in Arkansas
  - Cache River Bridge, a historic road bridge in Arkansas
- Cache River (Illinois)
  - Cache River State Natural Area, a protected area in Illinois
  - Cache River Wetlands Center, a nature center in Illinois

== See also ==
- Cache Creek (disambiguation)
- Cache Valley (disambiguation)
- Cache la Poudre River
- Hidden River (disambiguation)
