= Steel crisis =

1970s recession in the global steel market

The steel crisis was a prolonged downturn in the global steel market, occurring during the 1973–1975 and early 1980s recessions. It followed the post–World War II economic expansion and was exacerbated by the 1973 and 1979 oil crises, persisting well into the 1980s. The steel crisis had a significant impact on several industrial regions, including the Rust Belt in North America, the English Midlands in the United Kingdom, the Ruhr area in West Germany, and Bergslagen in Sweden.

== United States ==
Steel production by countries. United States steel production faced a steep decline in the 1970s.

Steel production and GDP. In most countries, steel production declines after reaching a certain level of GDP, suggesting that growth continues according to other factors.

Steel production in the United States peaked at 111.4 million tons in 1973, and declined slightly to 97.9 million tons in 1978. By 1984, steel production collapsed to just 70 million tons. The next peak was not reached until 2000, when 100 million tons was produced, before falling to 86 million tons in 2014. Imports played a role in this decline: from just 146,000 tons in 1946, steel imports reached 24 million tons in 1978 (for comparison, the U.S. imported 34.5 million tons in 2017); the U.S. became a net importer of steel in 1959. The federal government responded with multiple measures in an attempt to protect the steel industry, including import quotas from 1969 to 1973, trigger pricing from 1978 to 1980, and voluntary export restraints from 1983 to 1987. However, these policies increased prices for steel-consuming industries, which led to job losses and inflationary pressures, and the measures were quickly abandoned.

The American Iron and Steel Institute finds employment in the steel industry peaked in 1953 at 650,000 employees. Employment declined to just 512,000 jobs by 1974, approximately when the steel crisis began, and declined further to just 399,000 jobs in 1980 and further still to 236,000 jobs by 1984. Although the bulk of job losses occurred in the 1974–1986 period, steel employment would continue to decline for decades, reaching just 142,000 jobs in 2015.

Although foreign competition played a notable role in the decline of American steel employment, productivity gains have played an even larger role. By 1980, it was estimated that nearly one-fourth of American steel manufacturing was using outdated and inefficient methods and machinery. The number of man hours required to produce one ton of finished steel was 10.1 hours in 1980; this declined to just 1.5 hours by 2017, with some mini-mills requiring just 0.5 man hours. In addition, the strong dollar policy of the U.S. Federal Reserve and the development of new management strategies such as just-in-time manufacturing that call for major workforce reductions also played important roles in hampering U.S. manufacturing competitiveness and reducing employment. Youngstown, Ohio, was one of the hardest-hit cities during the steel crisis. The closure of Youngstown Sheet and Tube on September 19, 1977—an event known locally as Black Monday—led to economic and social decline, from which the city has never fully recovered, culminating when it lost its last major industrial employer General Motors in 2019 with the closure of Lordstown Assembly. Other major steel producing cities, such as Gary, East Saint Louis, Cleveland, and Toledo, never recovered from the losses in industry and resulting unemployment, depopulation, poverty, and crime.

From 1980 to 1988, U.S. Steel shuttered the 7 least-efficient of its 12 steel mills and slashed its industrial workforce from 75,000 employees to just 20,000, and salaried employees were reduced from 30,000 to just 5,000. By 1989, the American steel industry cut operating costs by 35% and increased labor productivity by 38%. U.S. Steel exported steel profitably for the first time in a decade.

== Britain ==
In Britain, government policies played a significant role in the steel crisis, differing from the situation in the United States. The steel industry was nationalized in 1967 by the Labour government. Historian Alasdair Blair states that British Steel Corporation (BSC) had "serious problems" including complacency with existing obsolescent plants (plants operating under capacity and thus at low efficiency); outdated technology; price controls that reduced marketing flexibility; soaring coal and oil costs; lack of capital investment funds; and increasing competition on the world market. Blair argues that by the 1970s the government kept employment artificially high in a declining industry. This especially impacted BSC since it was a major employer in a number of depressed regions. In the 1980s, Conservative Prime Minister Margaret Thatcher re-privatised BSC.

British steel employment numbered 197,000 jobs in 1974, falling to 179,000 in 1977, further still to 112,000 in 1980, and then a severe decline to less than 62,000 jobs in 1984.

== European community ==
Many major steel producing countries and regions in Europe, such as Luxembourg, the Ruhr area in Germany, southwestern Sweden, Belgium, Italy's Industrial Triangle and the far south, and northern France also suffered immensely during the 1970s and 1980s. Total steel employment across the European Community's 9 member states declined from 795,000 in 1974 to 722,000 in 1977, further still to 598,000 in 1980, and then 446,000 in 1984.

The causes of the declines in these countries were similar to the United Kingdom's: foreign competition (primarily against each other), overcapacity resulting from construction of mills during the post-war boom and integration of markets, and productivity gains. The European Community tripled its steel production during the 1950–1970 period, and remained a net exporter of steel into the 1980s. The end of the post-World War II boom also played a role as markets matured and became saturated and demand for steel peaked in construction, appliance makers, and auto manufacturing.

== Bibliography ==
- Birch, Alan. Economic History of the British Iron and Steel Industry (Routledge, 2013).
- Blair, Alasdair M. "The British iron and steel industry since 1945." Journal of European Economic History 26#3 (1997): 571+.
- Dudley, G. F., and J. J. Richardson, eds. Politics and Steel in Britain, 1967–1988: The Life and Times of the British Steel Corporation (1990), ISBN 978-1855210721
- Evans, I. M. "Aspects of the Steel Crisis in Europe, with Particular Reference to Belgium and Luxembourg," Geographical Journal Vol. 146, No. 3 (Nov., 1980), pp. 396–407 in JSTOR
- Meny, Yves, and Vincent Wright, eds. The Politics of Steel: Western Europe and the Steel Industry in the Crisis Years (1987) excerpt and text search
- Rhodes, Martin; Wright, Vincent. "The European Steel Unions and the Steel Crisis, 1974–84: A Study in the Demise of Traditional Unionism," British Journal of Political Science, Apr 1988, Vol. 18 Issue 2, pp 171–195 in JSTOR
- Scheuerman, William. The Steel Crisis: The Economics and Politics of a Declining Industry (1986)
- Warrian, Peter. A Profile of the Steel Industry: Global Reinvention for a New Economy (Business Expert Press, 2016).
