= Southern Park Mall =

Shopping mall in Mahoning County, Ohio, U.S.

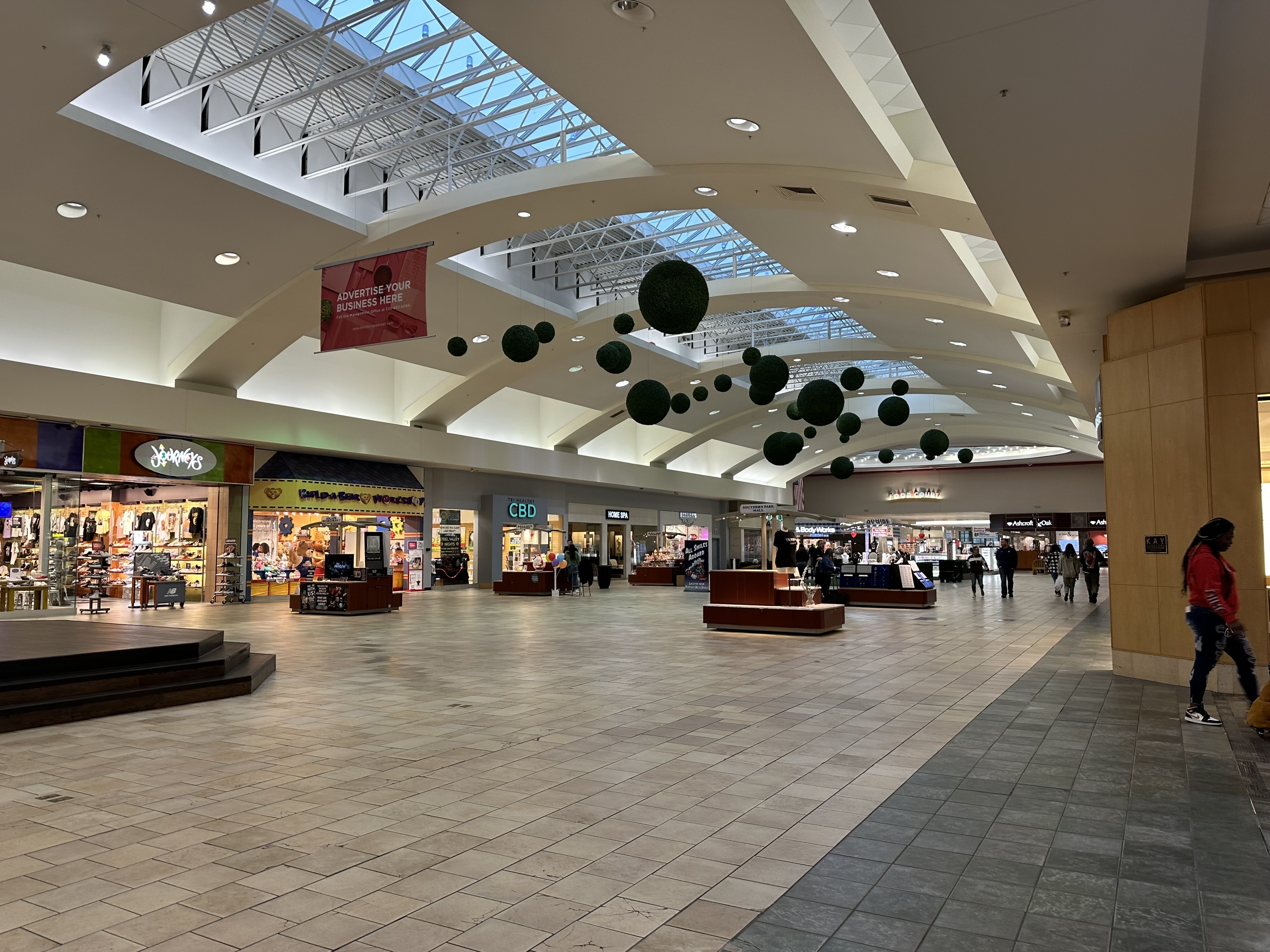
- Center Court (February 2023)
- Location: Boardman, Ohio, U.S.
- Coordinates: 41°01′17″N 80°39′32″W
- Address: 7401 Market Street, 44512
- Opened: 1969–1970
- Renovated: 1980; 1996-1997; 2011; 2021
- Previous names: Boardman Mall; Park South Mall
- Developer: Edward J. DeBartolo Corporation; Cafaro Company
- Manager: Kohan Retail Investment Group
- Owner: Kohan Retail Investment Group
- Architect: Frank DeBartolo
- Num. of stores: 50+ (space for 108)
- Num. of anchor tenants: 4 traditional (2 open, 1 vacant, 1 demolished); 3 junior
- Floor area: 1,018,400 square feet (94,610 m^{2})
- Floors: 1 (2 in Macy's, JCPenney, former Dillard's)
- Parking: Uncovered, lighted lot
- Public transit: WRTA
- Website: southernparkmall.com

Southern Park Mall is a super-regional shopping mall located in Boardman, Ohio, United States, serving the Youngstown–Warren metropolitan area. It was developed by the Edward J. DeBartolo Corporation in 1970, and is owned and operated by Kohan Retail Investment Group as of December 2024. The mall, which is the largest enclosed shopping destination in Mahoning County, has approximately 1,018,400 square feet (94,610 m^{2}), with space for about 108 stores. Its anchor stores are JCPenney and Macy's, with junior anchors H&M, Shoe Dept. Encore, and Planet Fitness. Since 2021, the mall has featured a lifestyle component called DeBartolo Commons on the southern anchor pad formerly occupied by Sears.

== History ==
=== 1963–1978: Development and opening ===
==== Early concepts ====
In 1963, the Cafaro Company planned to construct a partially enclosed shopping mall and shopping plaza on a plot of land directly across from Boardman High School and what is now the location of Southwoods Health Campus. Then called "Park South Mall" project hit a roadblock due to some of its top project managers being charged with misdemeanors after violating a construction order in 1964. Combined with further push back from Boardman Township officials, and local residents its only signed anchor tenant pulled out by the end of 1964.

Almost two years after the failed Park South Mall development by William M. Cafaro, plans were announced in early 1966 for a new shopping center called "Boardman Mall" to take its place. By April, Boardman Zoning had approved a zoning change from residential, to commercial for the project. Fighting against this change was an Edward J. DeBartolo Corporation subsidiary, citing worries of the project killing off the DeBartolo owned Boardman Plaza. The project would of consisted of a two-level T-shaped structure spanning over 1,000,000 square feet (93,000 m^{2}) with department stores at each end. Anchor stores would have included Montgomery Ward, Sears, and locally-based Strouss, all of which already were signed on to anchor Cafaro's nearby Eastwood Mall in Niles, Ohio which was also in development. Cafaro invited press and high ranking officers from different retail chains to a luncheon to showcase plans for the property. This "Boardman Mall" concept never came to be however, as in 1968, DeBartolo came onto the project, and planned location was moved to the preferred option at the intersection of Route 7 and Route 224.

==== Namesake ====
The Southern Park Mall was named after the Southern Park Race Track, a historic horse racing facility that was about 1 1/2 miles (2.4 km) miles south of the mall's present position. The horse track was bounded by Washington Boulevard, Southern Boulevard, and McClurg Road. One of the only remaining structures, the Southern Park Stable, was added to the National Register of Historic Places (NRHP) on July 10, 1986.

Development for Southern Park Mall began in 1968, with groundbreaking ceremonies occurring in August. By August 1969, all three anchor spaces and 90% of in-line space had been leased, with construction of the Sears nearing completion for its opening date in October. Southern Park Mall, which opened in between 1969 and 1970, was developed as a joint venture between William M. Cafaro and fellow Youngstown-based developer Edward J. DeBartolo Sr. By 1971, the Edward J. DeBartolo Corporation bought out the Cafaro Company's 35% interest in the project and became the sole owner and manager of the property. The mall's three anchor stores totaled 905,600 square feet (84,133 m^{2}) and cost about $15 million. Sears was the first to open on October 1, 1969, relocating from a Cafaro owned building in 'uptown' Youngstown. Followed by F. W. Woolworth on February 12, 1970. And JCPenney on April 2, 1970. Youngstown-based Strouss' opened on April 17, 1970, being the "luxury" focal point of the mall, with a grand marble entrance, and a modern, brightly lit interior. At the time of its opening, Strouss' featured a full service restaurant under its third-story glass dome, called the "Terrace Room." Both JCPenney and Strouss' relocated from DeBartolo's nearby Greater Boardman Plaza, located approximately one mile west of Southern Park Mall, with the new JCPenney being the Youngstown area's first full-line location.

Strouss' center court entrance, c. January 1986

Other major and initial stores included Gray Drugs, Kroger, Livingston's, and the Southern Park Theater. By late May and early June 1970, the vast majority of inline tenants were open, with Livingston's opening on May 4, Richman Brothers opening May 21, and Gray's Drugstore on June 3. The final phase of openings came in August 1970, with thirteen more retailers opening their doors.

On July 1, 1972, Kroger closed its supermarket at the mall. The Pittsburgh, Pennsylvania-based Joseph Horne Company began construction on a fourth anchor unit in July 1972 and opened the store following year. In March of 1973, a statement was released via The Vindicator that a Robert Hall junior department store would be opening in the full 20,000 sq ft (1,900 m^{2}) of the former Kroger. By January 1978, Robert Hall had vacated the mall. At this time, the DeBartolo Corporation announced that four new stores would open in its place. York Steak House would fill 7,000 sq ft (650 m^{2}), with Lerner Shops taking up 8,900 sq ft (830 m^{2}) of the space; with the remaining 4,100 sq ft (380 m^{2}) being divided between two smaller inline tenants. Lerner Shops was only accessible inside of the mall, with York Steakhouse having exterior access. All four tenants were open by the end of 1978.

=== 1980–1999: Early years and Simon acquisition ===
In April 1980, Marshall Field's purchased Union Co., the parent company of Livingston's. Following the acquisition, it was announced that the two remaining Livingston's locations would shutter by May 1980. In October 1980, the DeBartolo Corporation began a $2 million refurbishment and renovation project throughout the mall for its tenth "birthday." The project included new burgundy carpeting, lighting throughout the concourses, and refreshed outdoor landscaping. Five new stores opened, and three of which took up the former Livingston's store located in the JCPenney concourse. The renovation was completed by October 20.

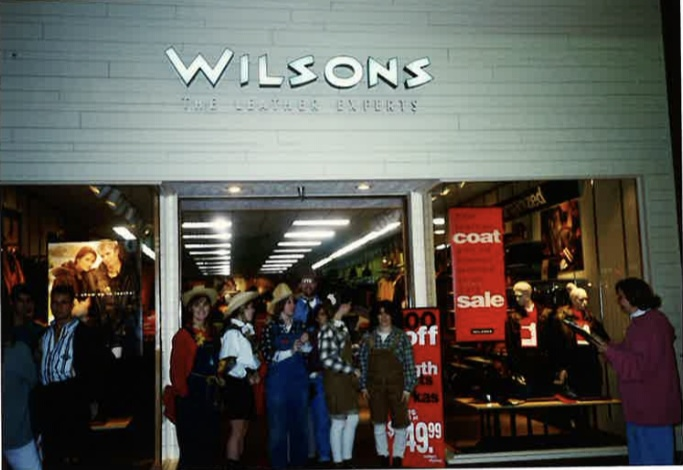
Wilsons Leather in 1992. The store was located in Center Court until 2009.

In 1983, JCPenney received an extensive renovation. The store was one of 450 across the United States to be reconstructed, re-carpeted, and re-fixtured. The location closed following the holiday season of 1982 and reopened June 1, 1983. On September 18 of that year, Joseph Horne Company held a "grand unveiling" of their newly renovated multi-million dollar store. Several other new inline tenants opened in November 1983.

Strouss' was converted to Kaufmann's in 1986 when the May Department Stores Company merged its divisions. In July 1989, the newly rebranded Kaufmann's began a $1.2 million dollar renovation of its store, which included an expansion of the first floor and new ready-to-wear departments for designer brands like Gucci and Fendi. In April 1989, Southern Park Theater closed permanently. Ruby Tuesday opened in a portion of the former Southern Park Theater in October 1989. In May 1990, Eddie Bauer opened, and Ann Taylor opened on November 15, 1990, with the location being their first store in the Youngstown market. The opening of these stores signified Boardman bridging the gap between Cleveland, Ohio, and Pittsburgh, Pennsylvania, shopping for locals by bringing new, larger name brands to the center. On December 19, 1990, the York Steak House reopened under the Ponderosa name. Ponderosa closed sometime in 1994 and was filled by Buffalo Wild Wings in 1996.

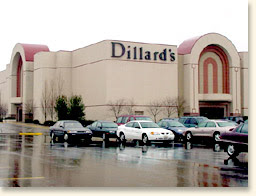
Dillard's following their 1994 renovation

A number of changes to the center occurred in 1992, starting in January with eight inline stores closing following the 1991 holiday season. To assist in filling in the vacancies, new stores such as Glamour Shots opened, and present tenants such as Foot Locker received remodels, or expansions. Higbee's acquired Joseph Horne Company in collaboration the DeBartolo Corporation in June 1992. Horne's closed on July 12, 1992, with plans to rebrand the location along with four other Horne's stores to Dillard's. Dillard's opened a month later on August 12, 1992. Starting in 1994, the Dillard's store began renovation and expansion. The estimated total cost of the addition was $3 million and brought the store to about 100,000 sq ft (9,300 m^{2}).

==== 1997 renovation ====
JCPenney court looking south-western towards Sportstown, Christopher & Banks, and FootAction (2009)

In March 1996, the DeBartolo Realty Corporation merged with Simon Property Group of Indianapolis, Indiana for $3 billion, giving them ownership of Southern Park Mall. In 1997, the mall went under an extensive renovation. Simon spent $19.3 million making improvements to the interiors, adding a food court and a Cinemark Tinseltown USA movie theater at the southeastern edge of the mall's property. It opened in 1997 with 7 screens. Throughout the 1997 renovation, 13 new skylights were implemented in the concourses. Sears also received a multi-million dollar renovation. By the end of 1997, longstanding junior anchor Woolworth closed. Jillian's Entertainment Complex, along with a large "tri-plex" Footlocker configuration, and The Afterthoughts replaced Woolworth by 1999. Among the amenities guests could find inside of Jillian's, were bowling lanes, a video arcade, a billiards lounge, and business conference rooms. Jillian's opened June 12, 1999.

=== 2000–2019: Simon and Washington Prime Group ===
In April 2000, a new concept retailer called The Saturn Store opened in the eastern Ruby Tuesday concourse; in between Buffalo Wild Wings, and New York & Company. The store was operated by the General Motors-owned Saturn Corporation, and had three of their different sedans packed into one inline space. The concept only lasted a six-month lease term. In December 2000, Simon announced that they would be renovating the former Burger King space in the Sears concourse into a Simon Youth Center, a foundation designed as an alternative approach to education, operated by the Simon Youth Foundation.

On March 30, 2005, high-end specialty retailer Caché opened at the mall in center court. In 2006, Kaufmann's re-branded to Macy's following its acquisition by the company. On February 1, 2009, Coach officially opened in center court, signaling a change toward higher-end offerings according to The Vindicator.

View of Express, Champs Sports, looking south down JCPenney concourse

In 2011, Jillian's Entertainment Complex shuttered. In April 2014, Simon Property Group announced the sale of Southern Park Mall to its Columbus, Ohio-based spin-off, Washington Prime Group (WPG). On April 30, 2015, H&M opened an 18,000 square foot store in the Sears concourse. In April 2018, Sears announced that they would be closing their location at the mall in July. In February 2019, Dillard's announced that they would also be closing in May, leaving JCPenney and Macy's as the only remaining anchors. That same week, the Dillard's building was sold to Boardman SC LLC, a Cafaro Co. subsidiary.

=== 2019–present: Redevelopment and Kohan ===
In redevelopment efforts, Washington Prime Group demolished the vacant Sears building in late 2019, with plans to add some smaller exterior storefronts. These plans decreased the overall square footage of the mall. DeBartolo Commons opened in 2021 at the site of the former Sears, adding recreational spaces and restaurants to the complex. Earlier that year, Planet Fitness relocated to the mall, combining former tenant locations and creating a new junior anchor space on the mall's east side.

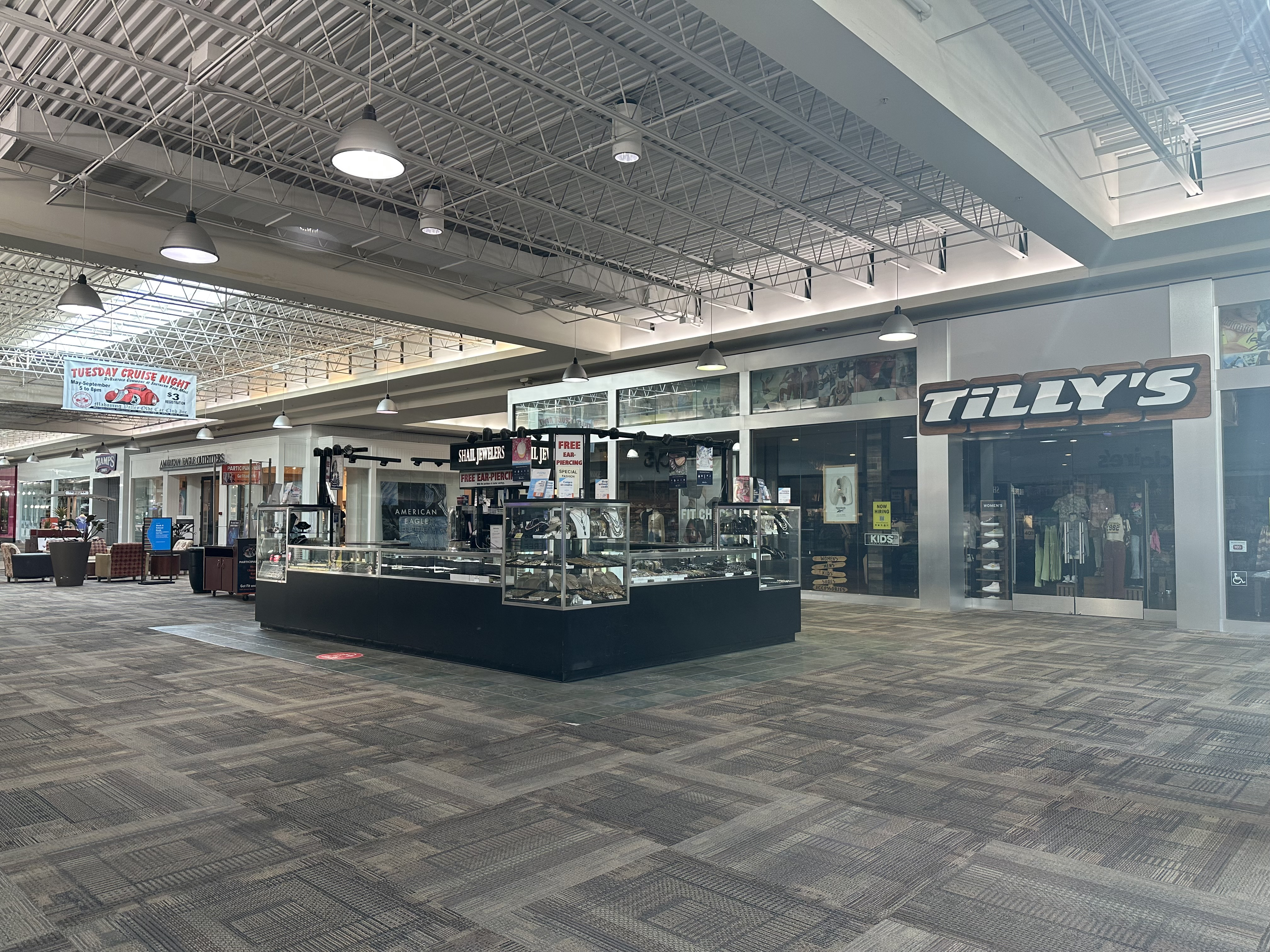
View of Tilly's, American Eagle in JCPenney concourse

In October 2024, it was reported that Kohan Retail Investment Group was in talks with Washington Prime Group to purchase Southern Park. The transaction was completed on December 23, 2024, for $24.1 million. Since the purchase, local officials have heard very little from Kohan and property tax payments were delinquent for the mall. As of May 2025, approximately $520,000 in back taxes were owed, as well as nearly $50,000 in penalties. On December 22, 2025, Kohan paid the balance of just over $1 million in back taxes and penalties, days after Boardman Township trustees asked the Ohio attorney general to investigate the Kohan Group for alleged fraudulent activity. On August 11, 2026, Buffalo Wild Wings announced that they would be leaving the Southern Park Mall, in favor of a free-standing space located at the nearby Shops at Boardman Park. According to building permits from Boardman Township, the new location is set to be open by December 1, 2026.

== Peripheral properties ==
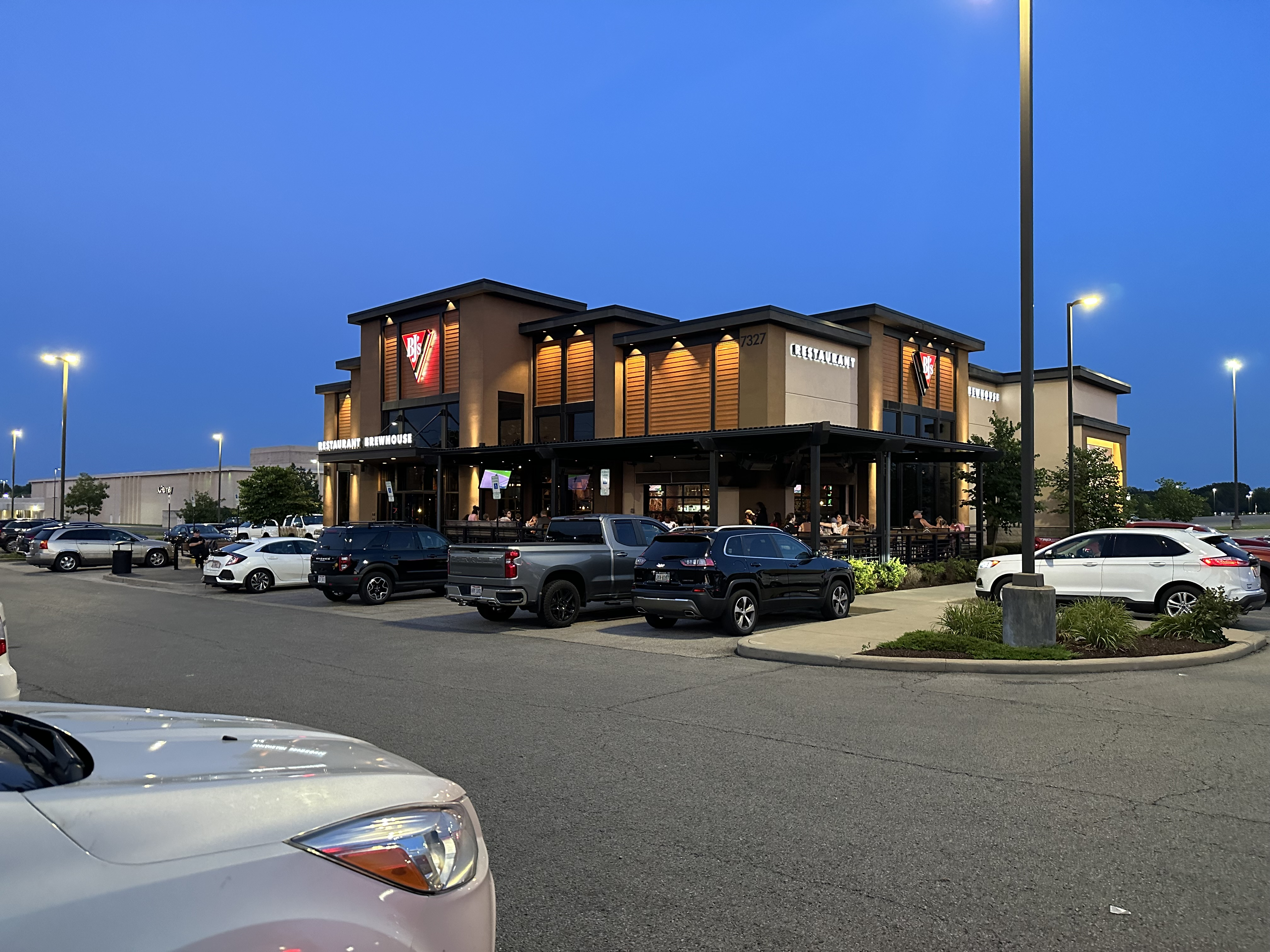
BJ's Restaurant & Brewhouse as opened in 2017

At the time of the mall's opening between 1969 and 1970, both JCPenney and Sears had standalone auto centers that opened together with their respective department stores. In 1983, JCPenney announced that they would be closing their Auto Center on the malls north-eastern edge. It reopened as Firestone Auto Care, following a re-brand.

In 1994, Chili's announced they would be building a new location outside of the mall on the northwestern portion of the property. The restaurant opened in early 1995. In 2008, following the recession, PNC Financial purchased National City Bank, therefore re-branding the branch outside Southern Park Mall, to PNC. On April 12, 2012, Cheddar's Casual Cafe announced it would be opening a location directly next to Chili's on the northwestern edge of the property. On November 16, 2015, Cheddar's closed permanently. On July 16, 2016 BJ's Restaurant & Brew House announced they would be opening a new location in Boardman, by demolishing the former Cheddar's. BJ's opened on April 24, 2017, in the north-western corner of the mall's parking lot; next to Chili's. In 2018, the Sears Auto Center closed along side with the Sears mainline store. In March 2021, PNC Bank announced they would be renovating their branch on the south-western portion of the parking lot. On May 14, 2025, Burke Decor Outlet located in the C-Square, outside of the mall, abruptly closed. On January 23, 2026, Kohan Retail Investment sold a parcel of land on the south-western part of the property to a local group, called Cocca Development for $350,000.

== Gallery ==
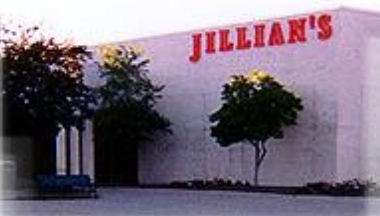
Jillian's (October 2002)

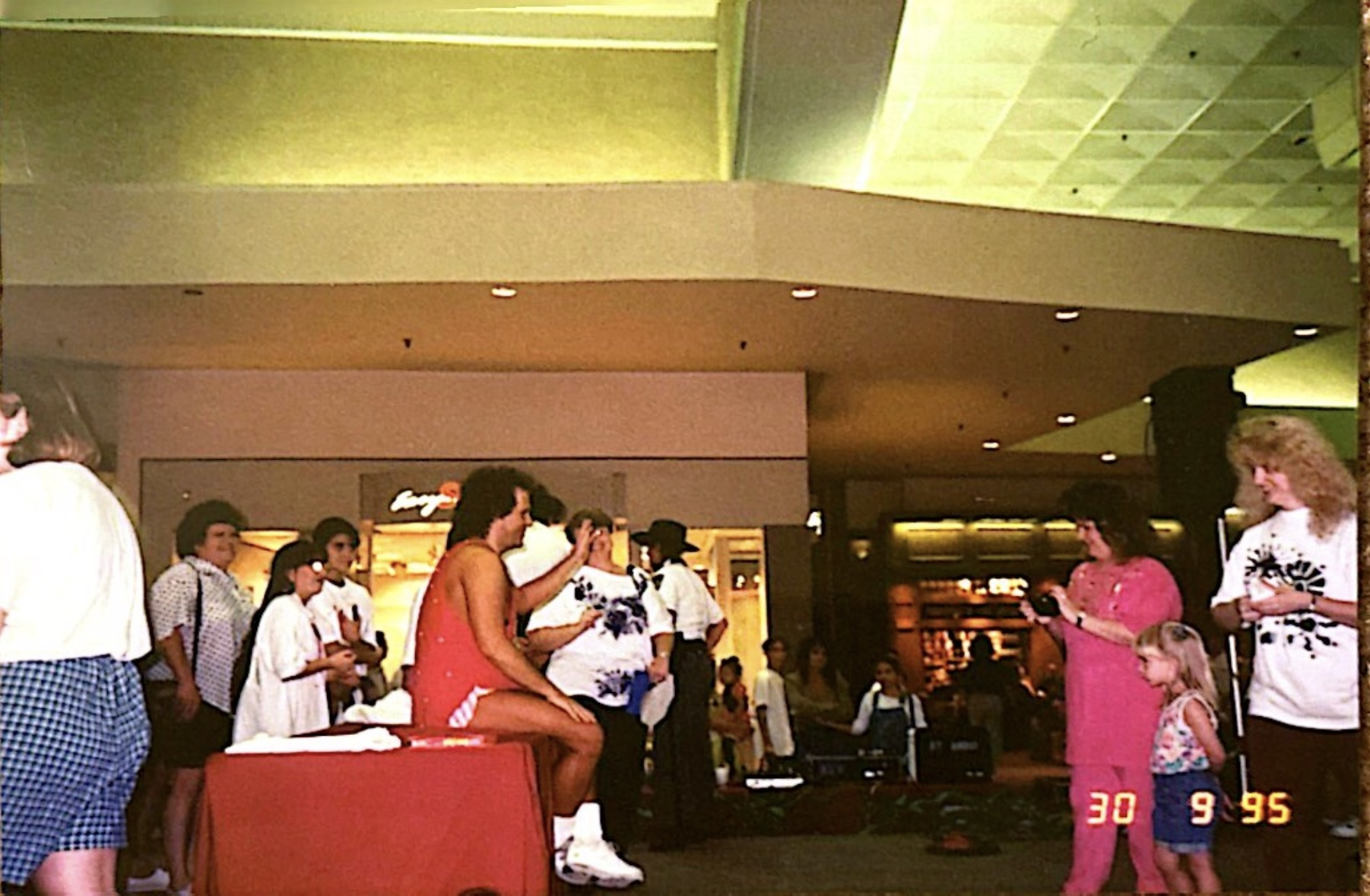
Richard Simmons, c. 1995

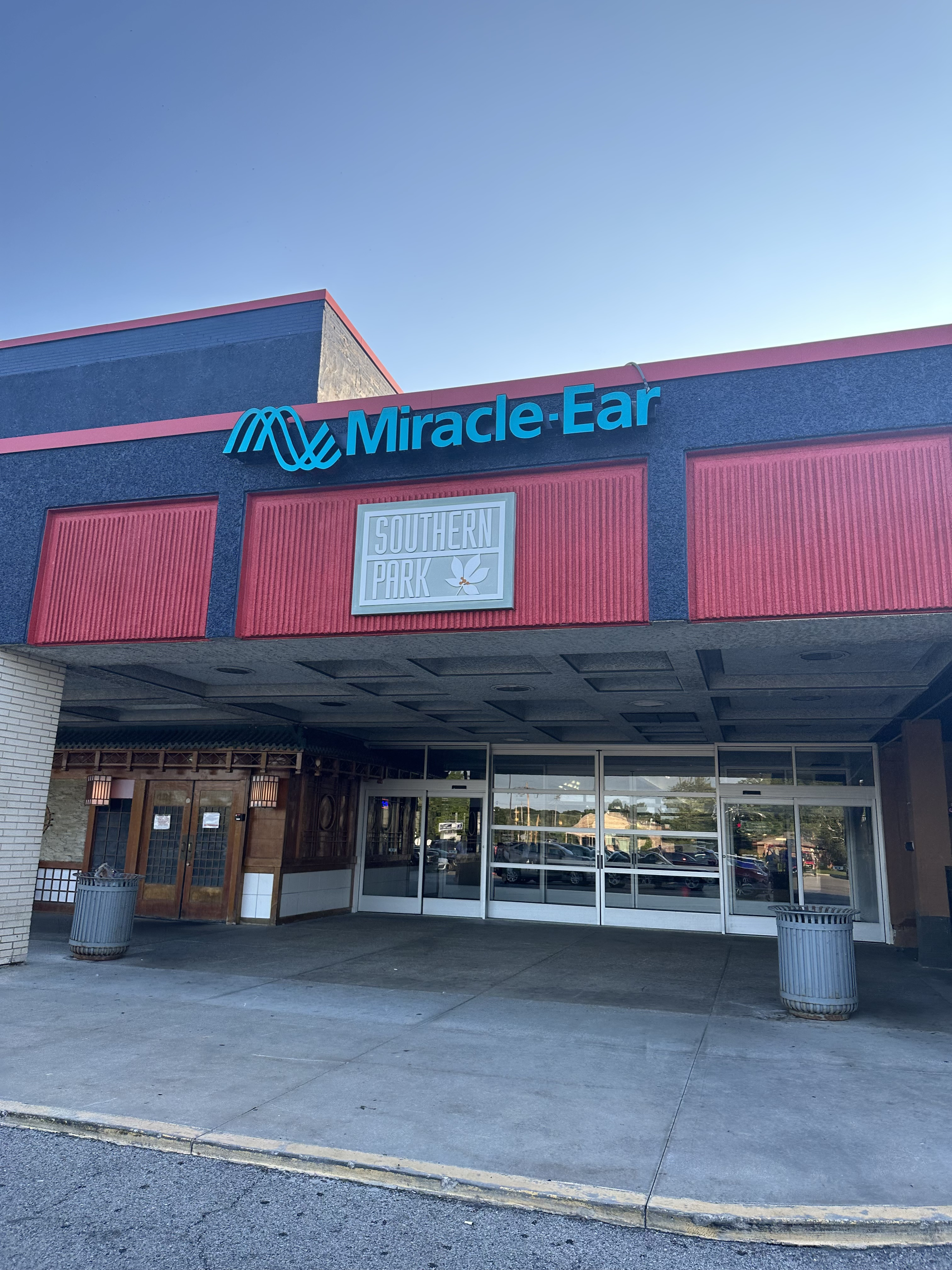
Eastern entrance (July 2023)

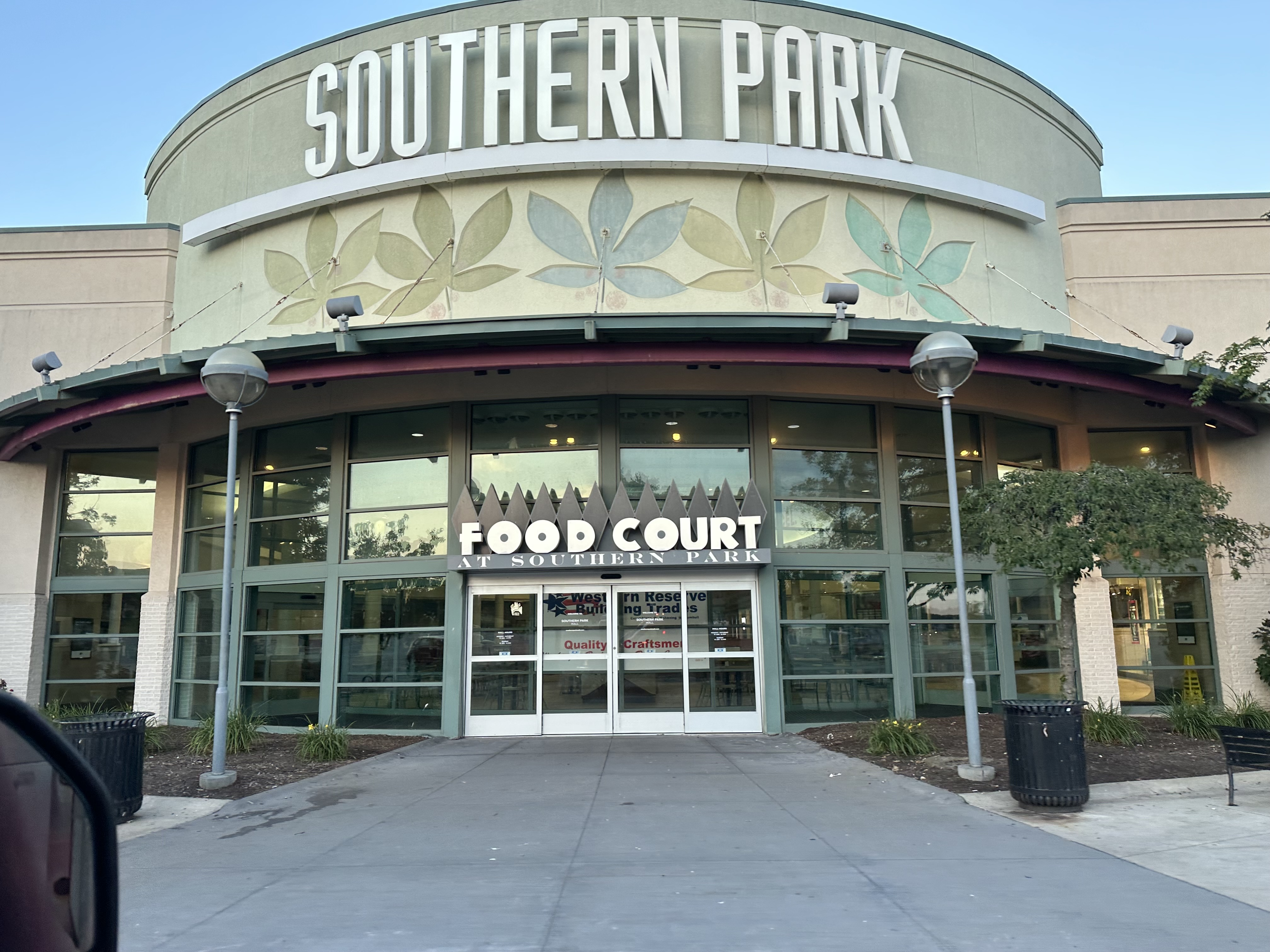
Food court entrance (July 2023)

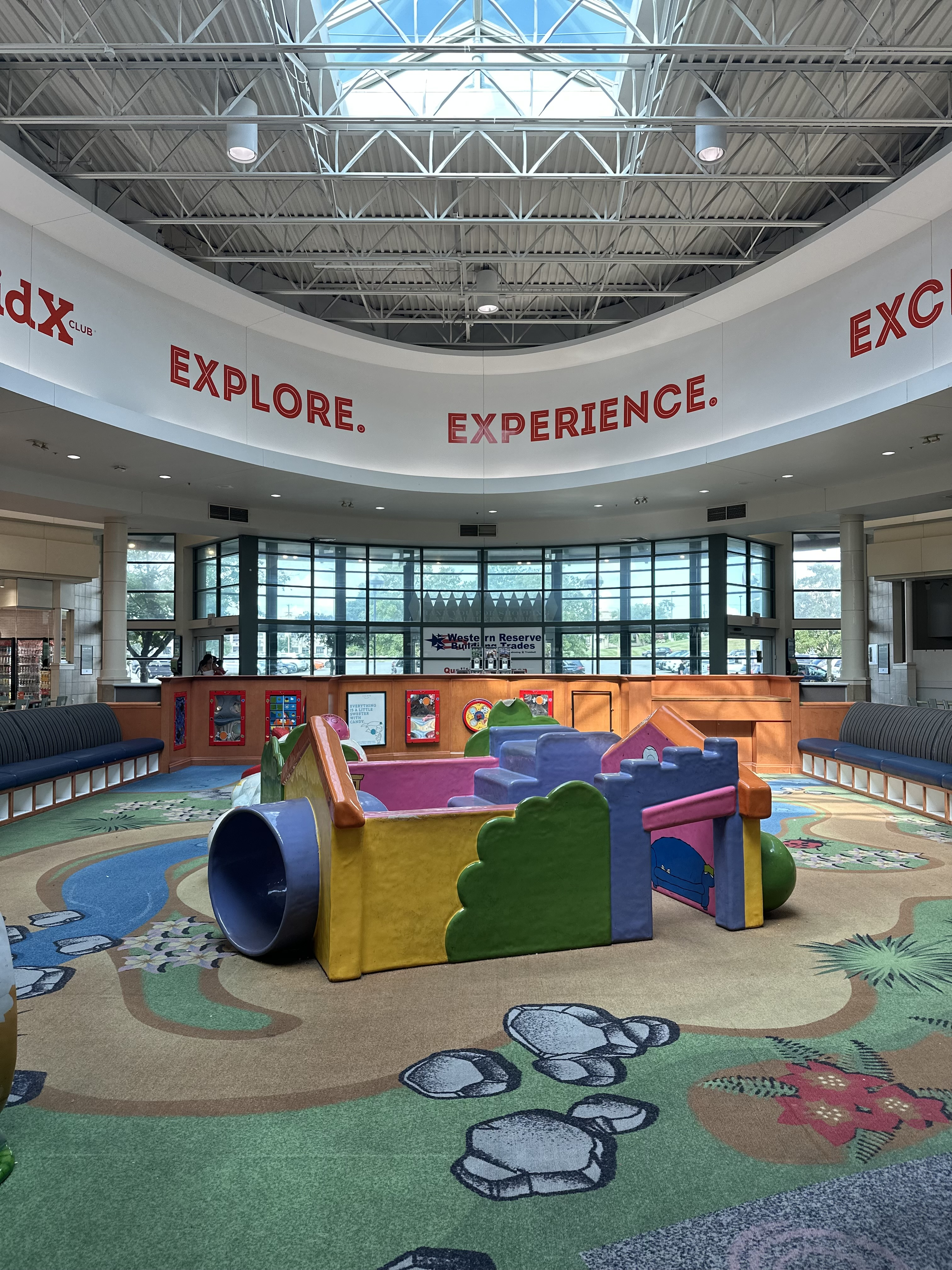
Food court and play area (July 2023)

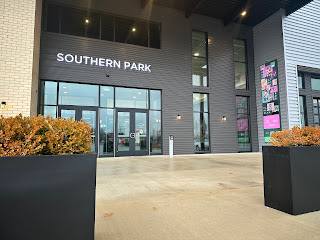
DeBartolo Commons entrance (November 2023)

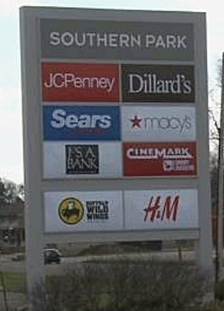
Market Street pylon sign (August 2018)

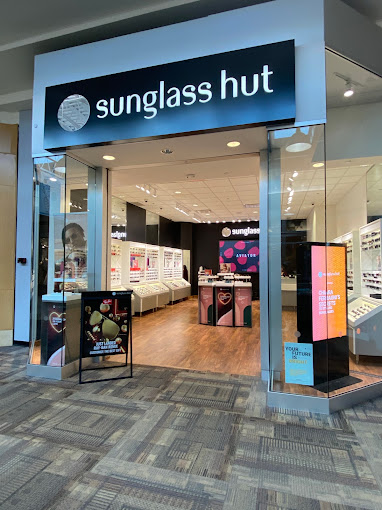
Sunglass Hut; Store closed on December 24, 2024

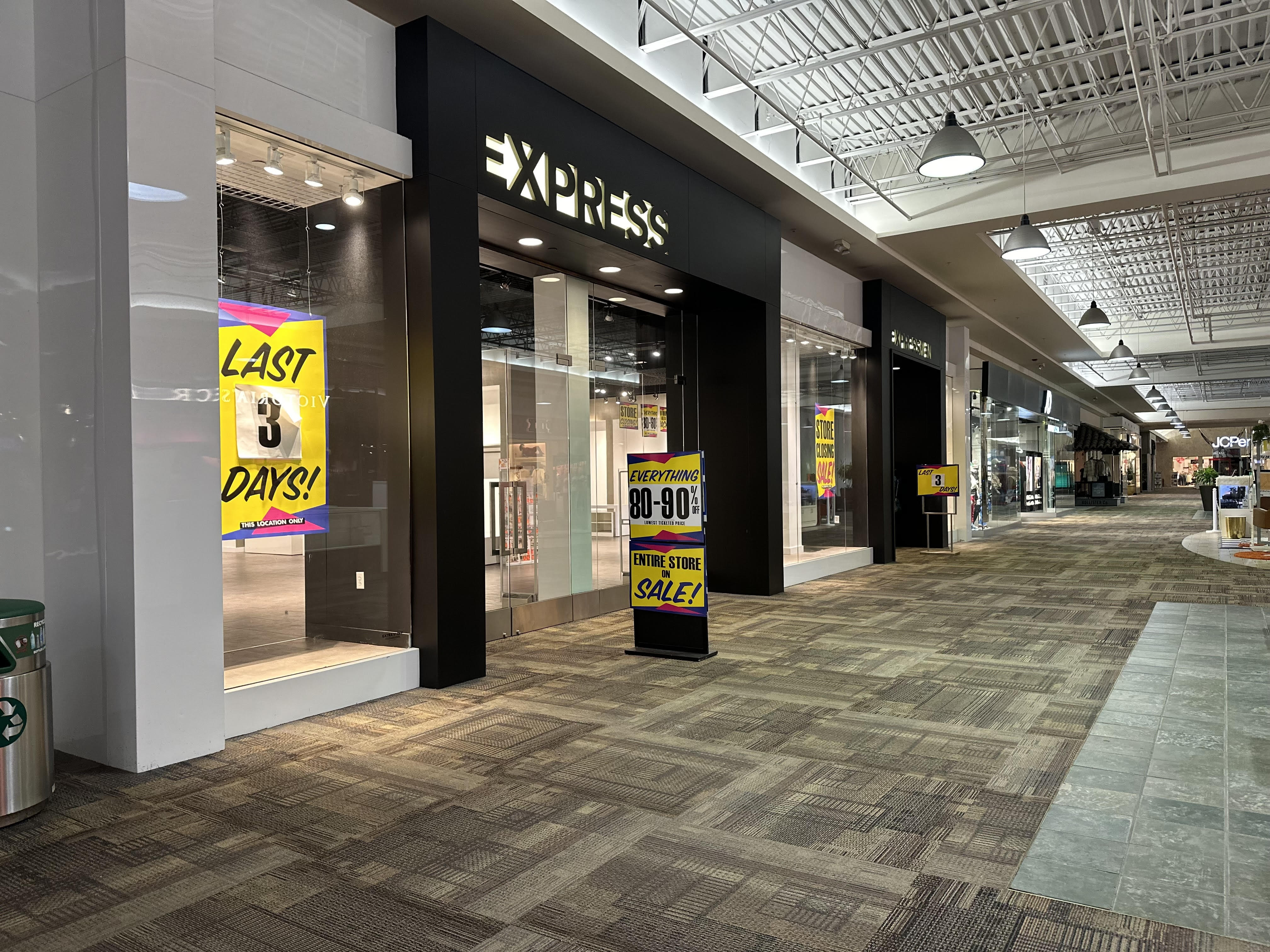
Express during its liquidation sale in 2023

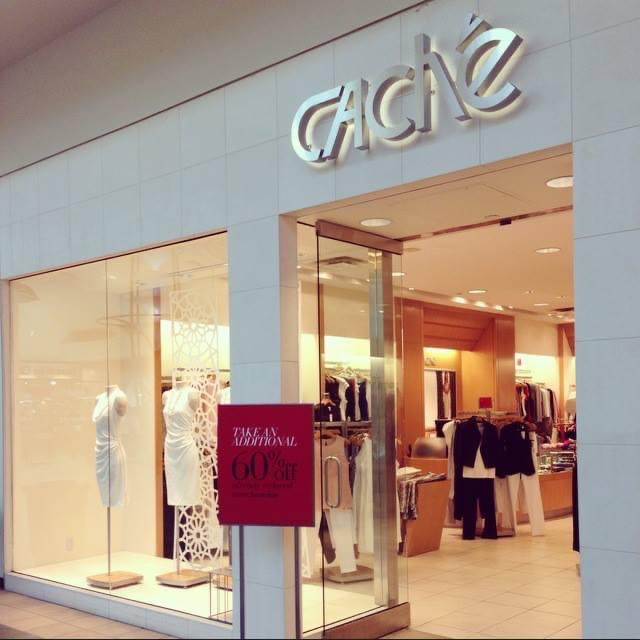
Caché store located in center court. c. 2013

Christmas display for 2010, featuring temporary Christmas shop, The Pickett Fence

View of center court, looking towards Dillard's, COACH, and Zales

FOX Head clothing store concept in center court, (2011)

== See also ==
- List of shopping malls in the United States
