= Cucumber Melon =

Fragrance by Bath & Body Works

Fragrance by Bath & Body Works
- Released: 1998
- Label: Bath & Body Works
- Perfumer(s): Kari Arienti (Givaudan)
- Awards: Fragrance Foundation Hall of Fame, Consumer Choice (2018)

Cucumber Melon is a fragrance introduced by Bath & Body Works in 1998. Sold as a body mist and across a range of bath and body products rather than as a conventional perfume, it became associated with 1990s American mall culture and was later revived by the company as a nostalgia product. It was inducted into the Fragrance Foundation's Hall of Fame in the Consumer Choice category in 2018.

== Composition ==
The scent combines cucumber, honeydew, cantaloupe, grapefruit and woody notes. It was created by the perfumer Kari Arienti of Givaudan. Bath & Body Works has said the formulation is unchanged from 1998.

== History ==
Cucumber Melon was launched in 1998 and was later given "retired scent" status, although Bustle reported in 2018 that it had remained more or less continuously available, usually at discounted prices, and that neither the company nor collectors could establish when, or whether, it had ever fully left shelves.

In 2016 the company revived it as part of a campaign that returned six heritage fragrances to sale for one month, alongside scents including White Tea & Ginger and Juniper Breeze. The response led to a second round that expanded the offer to eight collections.

For the fragrance's twenty-fifth anniversary in June 2023, Bath & Body Works released a limited-edition Cucumber Melon collection comprising a fragrance mist, body cream, body lotion, shower gel, hand soap and a candle.

== Reception ==
Writing for Bustle in 2018, Olivia Muenter described the scent as tied to memories of mall shopping and adolescence, and as representative of the accessibility of the Bath & Body Works brand. Madeline Bilis of Apartment Therapy wrote in 2023 that it functioned as a marker of 1990s and Y2K nostalgia.
