= Cache, Aosta =

Coordinates: 45°45′40″N 7°19′29″E

Cache
- Frazione
- Interactive map of Cache
- Country: Italy
- Region: Aosta Valley
- Commune: Aosta
- Time zone: UTC+1 (CET)
  - Summer (DST): UTC+2 (CEST)

Cache is a frazione of the city of Aosta, in the Aosta Valley region of Italy.
