= Strouss' =

Defunct American department store

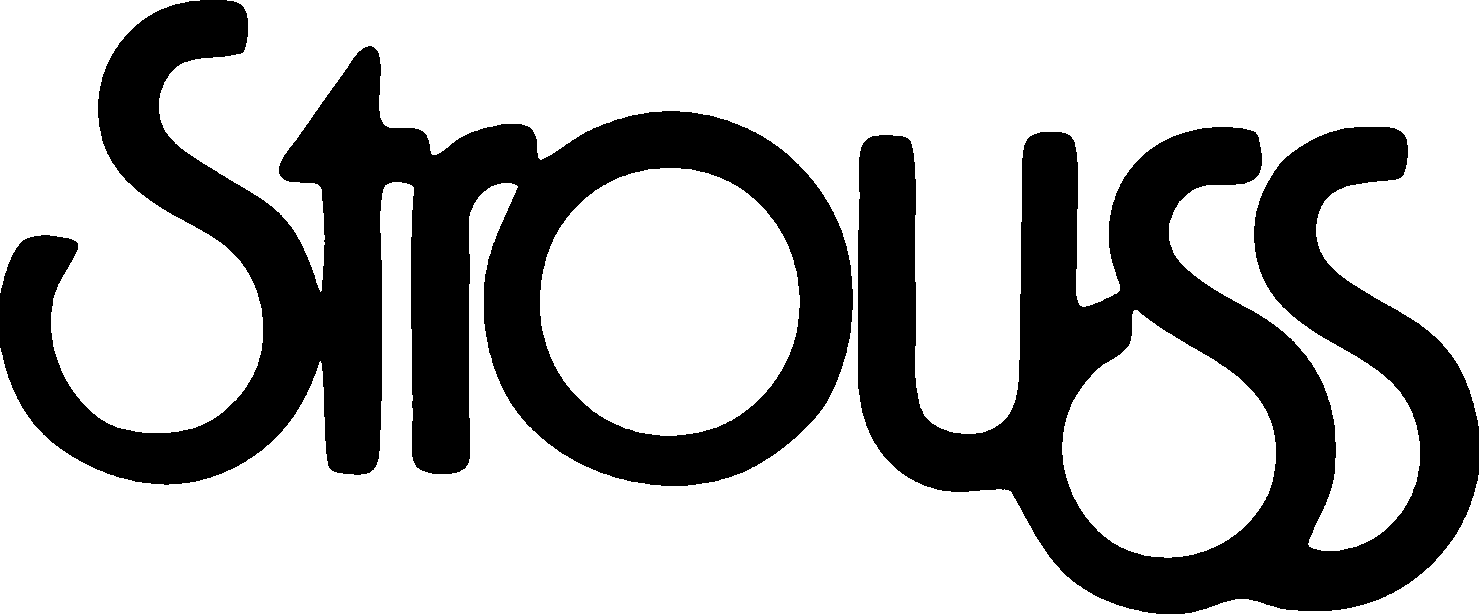

- Southern Park Mall location. Opened 1970, Converted to Kaufmann's in 1986; considered to be flagship Strouss, at opening.
- Formerly: Strouss-Hirshberg
- Type: Private
- Industry: Retail Department Store
- Founded: 1875
- Defunct: 1986
- Fate: Merged by the May Company with Kaufmann's
- Successor: Kaufmann's
- Headquarters: Youngstown, Ohio
- Number of locations: 12 at peak
- Area served: Northeastern Ohio, Western Pennsylvania
- Key people: C.J. Strouss
- Products: Clothing, footwear, bedding, furniture, jewelry, beauty products and housewares
- Parent: May Company

Strouss' was a department store originating in Youngstown, Ohio, serving North-Eastern Ohio, and North-Western Pennsylvania. At its peak the chain operated approximately 12 locations in the form of malls, downtown spaces, and strip plaza locations.

== History ==
The company was founded as Strouss-Hirshberg Co. by Isaac Strouss and Bernard Hirshberg, two young Americans of Jewish descent. It was long the leading department store in the Mahoning and Shenango Valleys. Under the ownership of May Department Stores, which purchased Strouss in 1947, its name was shortened to Strouss' (from Strouss' - Hirshberg) and was expanded throughout northern Ohio and western Pennsylvania under the leadership of C.J. Strouss, then president of Strouss.

In 1966, Strouss' opened at Boardman Plaza in Boardman Township, Ohio. In 1986, May Company made a corporate decision to consolidate the Strouss division into Kaufmann's. May Company promptly shut down many of its former locations in May of that year in part due to the depressed economy of the Youngstown metropolitan area and a strategic decision by May Company to focus on mall-only retail locations within the Kaufmann's division. Locations to be closed by May 30, 1986 included Austintown Plaza, downtown New Castle, Pennsylvania, and the long standing downtown Youngstown, Ohio stores.

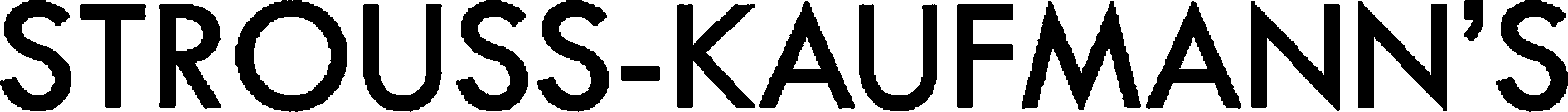
Strouss-Kaufmann's transition logo

== Locations ==
- Austintown Plaza, Austintown, Ohio - Operated 1967-1987 (Closed Following May Company Merger)
- Boardman Plaza, Boardman, Ohio - Operated 1966-1970 (Moved to Southern Park Mall)
- Downtown New Castle, Pennsylvania - Operated -1986 (Closed following May Company Merger)
- Downtown Sharon, Pennsylvania - Operated 1954-1979 (Closed by Strouss)
- Downtown Salem, Ohio - Operated 1948-1985 (Closed by Strouss)
- Downtown Warren, Ohio - Operated 1940-1983 (Closed by Strouss)
- Downtown Youngstown, Ohio - Operated until 1986 (Closed following May Company Merger)
- Eastwood Mall, Niles, Ohio - Operated 1969-1986 (Converted to Kaufmann's)
- Liberty Plaza, Liberty, Ohio - Operated until 1987 (Closed following May Company Merger)
- Shenango Valley Mall, Hermitage, Pennsylvania - Operated 1977-1986 (Converted to Kaufmann's)
- Southern Park Mall, Boardman, Ohio - Operated 1970-1986 (Converted to Kaufmann's)

== See also ==
- List of department stores converted to Macy's
