= Eastwood Mall =

Shopping mall in Trumbull County, Ohio

- The center court, and aquarium looking toward Boscov's (September 2026)
- Location: Niles, Ohio, U.S.
- Coordinates: 41°12′52″N 80°44′58″W
- Address: 5555 Youngstown-Warren Road
- Opened: September 16, 1969; 57 years ago
- Renovated: 1979 | 2000 | 2016 | 2026
- Previous names: Eastwood Mall Complex
- Developer: Cafaro Company
- Manager: Cafaro Company
- Owner: Cafaro Company
- Num. of stores: 100+
- Num. of anchor tenants: 5 anchors, 3 junior anchors
- Floor area: 1,600,000 square feet (150,000 m^{2})
- Floors: 1, with partial upper levels
- Public transit: WRTA
- Website: eastwoodmall.com

Eastwood Mall, formerly and formally the Eastwood Mall Complex, is a super-regional shopping mall in Niles, Ohio, United States, serving the Youngstown–Warren metropolitan area. It was developed, is owned, and operated by the Cafaro Company. Its anchor stores include Boscov's, JCPenney, Macy's, Target, and Dick's Sporting Goods. With junior anchors Dave & Buster's, Books-A-Million, and H&M. The mall contains over 100 stores and restaurants across 1,600,000 sq ft (150,000 m^{2}) of space. The mall is part of the greater Eastwood Mall Complex, which includes a variety of outdoor strip plazas totaling in over 3,200,000 square feet (300,000 m^{2}) of shopping space.

== History ==
=== 1969–1986: Early years ===
The mall opened on September 16, 1969, with Sears, Strouss, Montgomery Ward, and F. W. Woolworth as original anchors. Notably, it was the first mall to feature both Montgomery Ward and Sears under one roof. The property expanded in 1979, building a new JCPenney, as well as a corresponding concourse of inline shops. Montgomery Ward closed in 1984, and the space was split among Gold's Gym, Toys "R" Us, and Carlisle's. In 1986, Strouss' became Kaufmann's. Carlisle's closed in 1994, with Toys "R" Us relocating to just across the parking lot to a strip plaza space. Both the former Carlisle's, and Toys "R" Us spaces became Dillard's.

=== 2000–present ===
Target opened at the mall on October 8, 2000, connecting the store to the mall via hallway off the JCPenney wing. Kaufmann's rebranded to Macy's in 2006, with light interior rebranding and renovations taking place. At this time, a new food court was added near Macy's, in conjunction with interior renovations. Kahunaville, which opened at the mall in 1996, closed in March 2007.

Construction began on a Residence Inn by Marriott in the Dillard's wing in 2012. Firebirds Wood Fired Grill opened a jar to Dillard's later that year on December 10. On August 24, 2016, it was announced that Dillard's would be closing. However, after initial reports from local press outlets stating such, it was later identified that the location would remain open under the Dillard's Clearance Outlet name. In late 2016, the Cafaro Company added a new wing for their corporate offices, and an event center. At this time, Eastwood also received a new Hampton Inn & Suites. Coinciding with these, in 2017, additional renovation of the mall's entrance features and interior occurred. On October 15, 2018, it was announced that Sears would be closing as part of a plan to close 142 stores nationwide.

In 2019, Nickels and Dimes announced that it will close the Tilt Studio location at the mall by that December.A cosmetology school, the Casual Aveda Institute, opened on July 14, 2020, in the former Kahunaville space. In 2020, Boscov's announced plans to open a store in the former Sears and Tilt Studio. Boscov's opened on October 7, 2021. Dillard's closed its clearance center at the mall in June 2024.

On January 27, 2025, Dave & Buster's opened at the Eastwood mall in a portion of former Dillard's space. In late 2025, Dick's Sporting Goods announced that they would be opening one of their sporting goods stores in the remaining available space of the former Dillard's. Dick's Sporting Goods renovated the remaining former Dillard's space throughout late 2025 and into 2026. The store was eventually completed and opened on June 26, 2026.
