= Caché (retailer) =

American retail brand

- Final logo used before liquidation. Now used by Versona for Caché Collection.

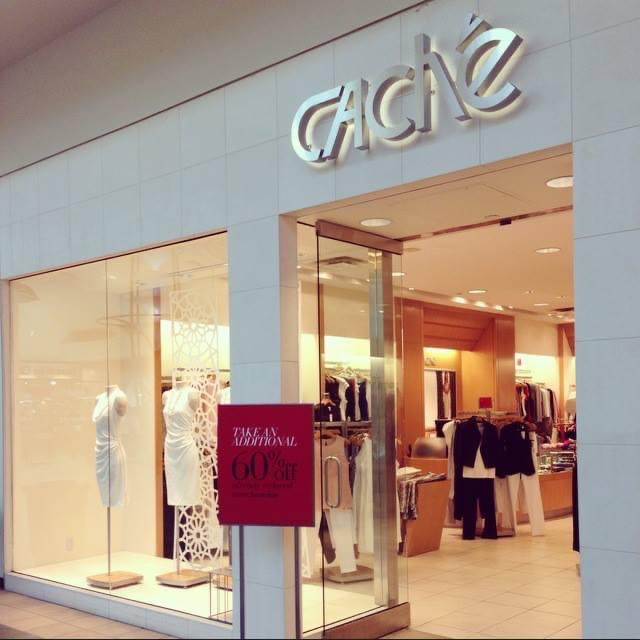
- Caché store located in Southern Park Mall (closed 2015)
- Trade name: Caché, Lillie Rubin
- Type: Public
- Traded as: CACH
- Industry: Clothing retailer
- Founded: 1975
- Defunct: 2015
- Fate: Chapter 11 bankruptcy
- Successor: Versona
- Headquarters: Miami
- Number of locations: 200+ (2010)
- Area served: North America
- Key people: Marilyn Rubinson
- Products: Designer ladieswear

Caché was an American retail brand primarily based in shopping malls. The company sold high-end ladieswear from 1975 until its liquidation in 2015. At its peak it had more than 200 locations. Since its closing, the Caché name and logo has been used by Versona for their "Caché Collection."

== History ==
The luxury clothing store was started in Miami in 1975 by Marilyn Rubinson. The brand's first location opened inside of Miami's Dadeland Mall. In 1981, a store opened at the Fort Lauderdale Galleria. By 1988, the brand had approximately 30 stores. By the early 2000s, the company had over 220 stores, in different malls across the country, including King of Prussia Mall, and Beachwood Mall. In 2004, the company began construction on their new location at The Oaks Mall. In February 2005, Caché announced they would be opening a branch inside of Southern Park Mall, in Boardman, Ohio.

The company failed to turn profits in 2011. In 2013, despite financial troubles, Caché opened a new flagship store located in The Fashion Show Mall, on the Las Vegas Strip. On January 29, 2015, the company was de-listed from the New York Stock Exchange, following failure to satisfy a continued listing rule or standard. In 2015, the company filed for Chapter 11 Bankruptcy protection, and announced they would be liquidating all stores, including the newly opened flagship store.
