= Cache Creek (Kern County, California) =

Unincorporated community in California, United States

Coordinates: 35.272185°N 117.943958°W

Cache Creek is an arroyo (dry wash) in the western Tehachapi Pass and Mojave Desert areas of Kern County, southern California.

The arroyo's intermittent creek flows seasonally from watersheds in the northeastern Tehachapi Mountains and southeastern Sierra Nevada foothills, and from infrequent rains as flash floods, ending in the Mojave Desert.

== Settlement ==
A small unincorporated settlement, known as Cache Creek, is located on the Cache Creek wash in the Mojave Desert, at the intersection of Cache Creek Road and California State Route 58 (Tehachapi Pass road) north of the town of Mojave.

== See also ==
- Tehachapi Mountains—related topics
