= Benedikt de Caché =

Austrian diplomat

Benedict (Benedikt) de Caché (c.a. 1740 – after 1809) was an Austrian diplomat. Member of the Austrian mission in Scotland from 1764 to 1782. Austrian representative (chargé d'affaires) in Poland from May 1782 to 1794. He was critical of the reforms of the Great Sejm. He returned to then-partitioned Poland in 1808, settling in Warsaw where he unofficially represent Austrian interests.

== Bibliography ==
- Buchholtz, Ludwig (1983). Powstanie kościuszkowskie w świetle korespondencji posła pruskiego w Warszawie: listy Ludwika Buchholtza do Fryderyka Wilhelma II, styczeń--czerwiec 1794 r (in Polish). Instytut Wydawniczy Pax. ISBN 978-83-211-0449-2.
- Kocój, Henryk (1988). Obrady Sejmu Wielkiego w świetle relacji posła austriackiego w Warszawie: raporty B. de Cachégo do kanclerza W. Kaunitza w Wiedniu, styczeń-sierpień 1792 (in Polish). Państwowe Wydawn. Naukowe. ISBN 978-83-01-08627-5.
