= Trapper's cache =

Hidden storage

A trapper's cache is a hole or small structure used to conceal and protect supplies so that they can be retrieved later. Caches were used by trappers in the North American fur trade to conceal supplies for the trapping season and to store pelts in preparation for the return trip.

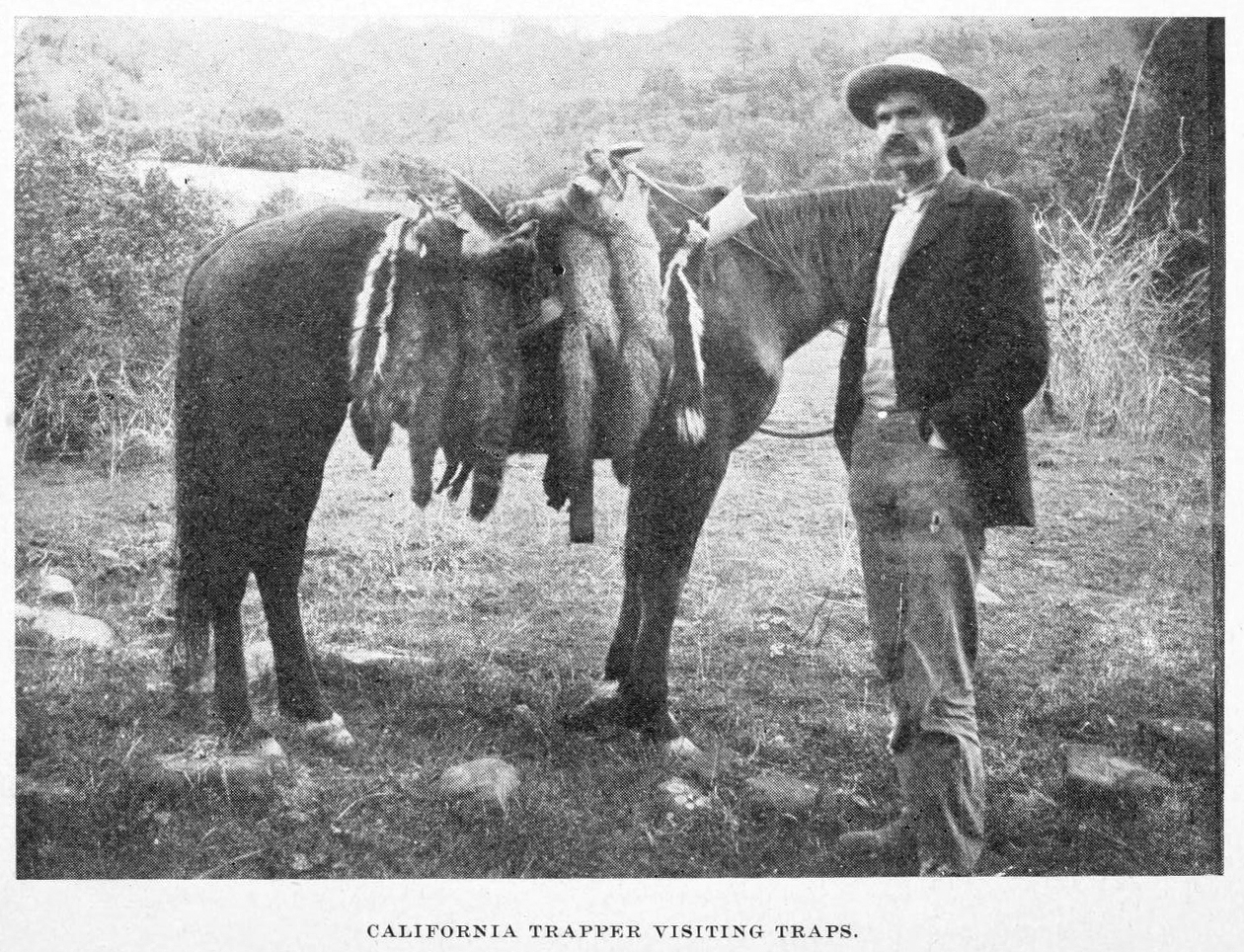
Trapper about to return to the cache

== Construction of a trapper's cache ==
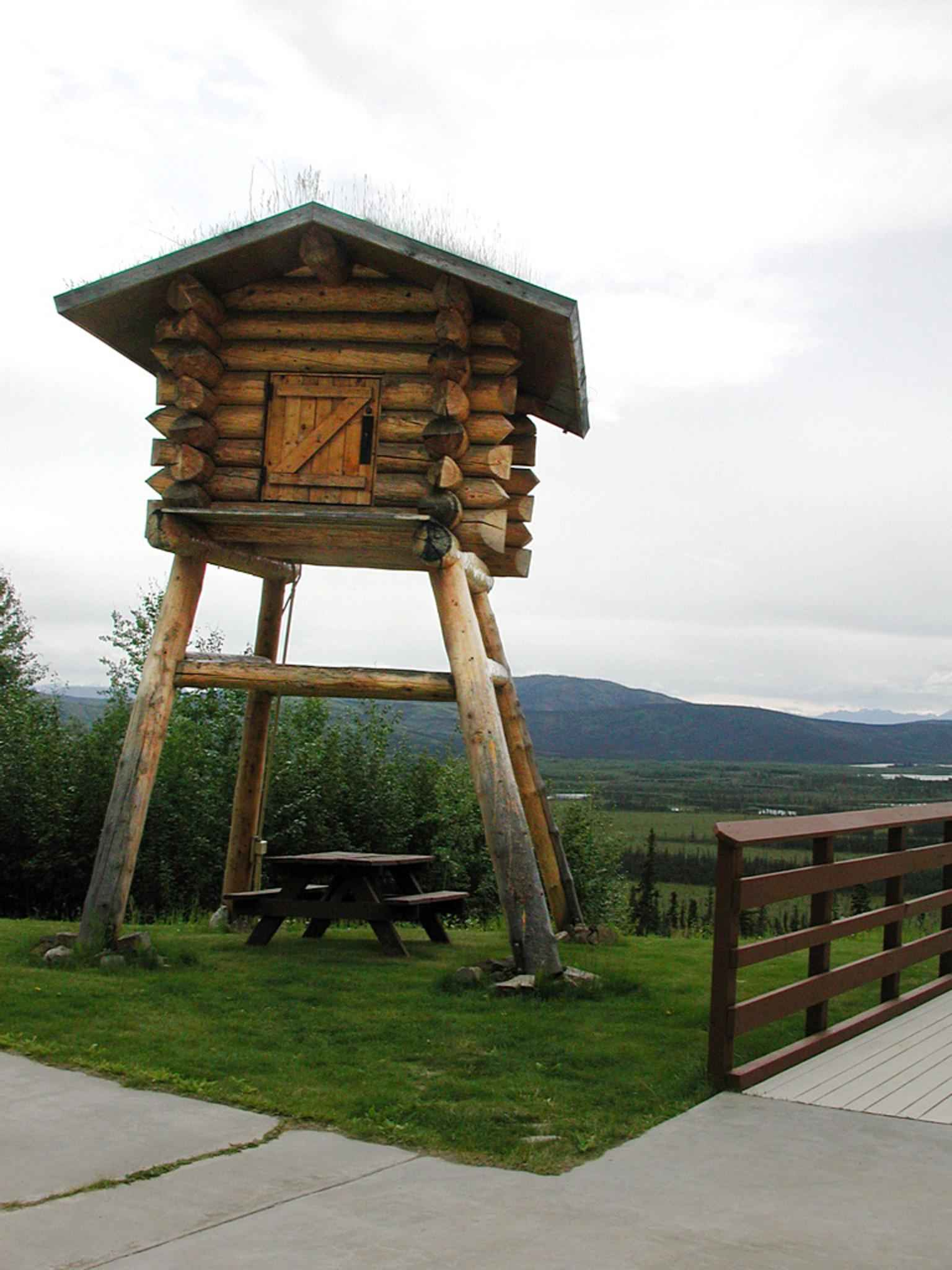
Replica elevated cache

Utah caches were concealed holes. Captain Meriwether Lewis, on June 9, 1805, described finding a hidden place, digging a hole, and making a concealed cover.

In northern areas caches were instead small sheds elevated on legs, to keep food and pelts out of reach of sled dogs, bears, and wolverines.
