= Western Reserve Transit Authority =

Mass transport operator in Mahoning County, Ohio

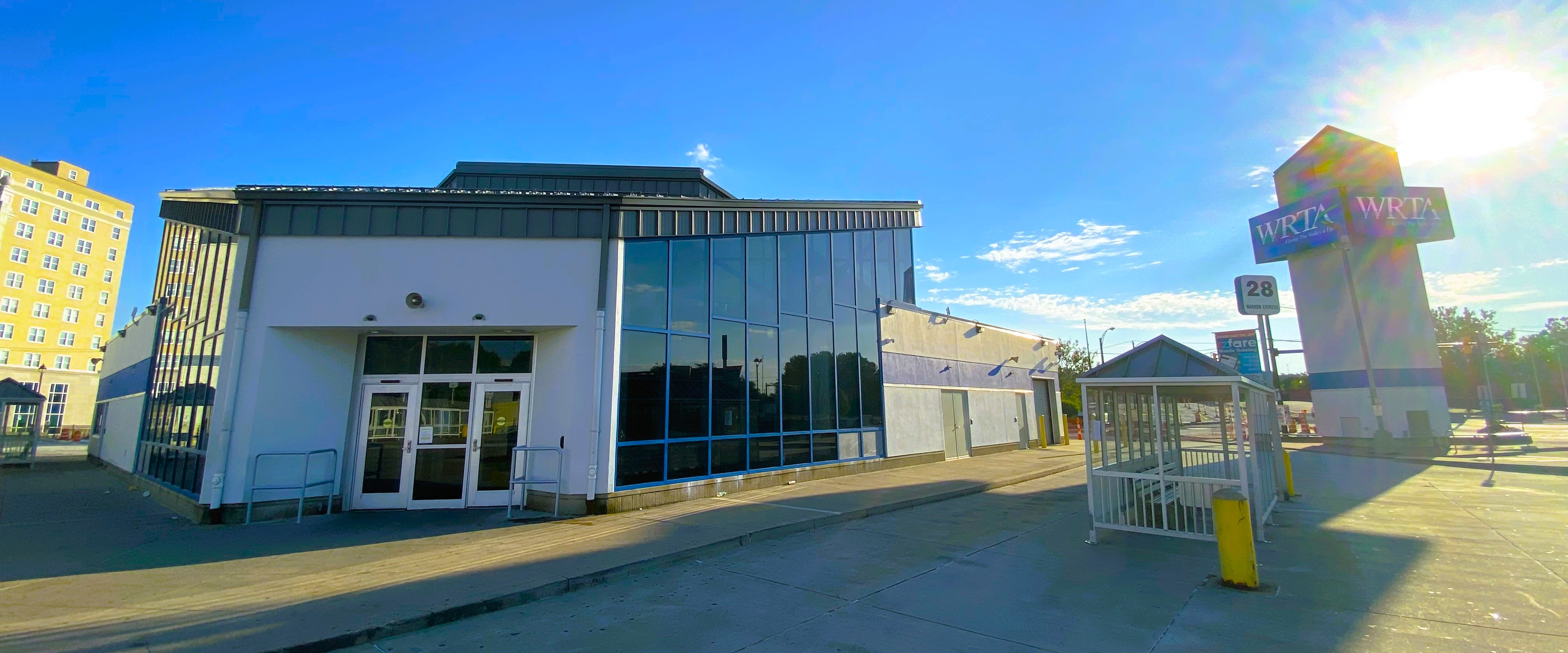
- Federal Station
- Headquarters: 604 Mahoning Avenue
- Locale: Youngstown, Ohio, U.S.
- Service area: Mahoning Valley
- Service type: bus service, Paratransit
- Routes: 24
- Hubs: 1
- Stations: Federal Station
- Fleet: Gillig low floor 35', Ram Cutaway vans, Ford Cutaway vans
- Daily ridership: 6,900 (weekdays, Q1 2026)
- Annual ridership: 2,029,300 (2025)
- Fuel type: Diesel
- Chief executive: Dean Harris (executive director)
- Website: wrtaonline.com

The Western Reserve Transit Authority is the public transit agency for Youngstown and the surrounding suburbs of Mahoning County, Ohio, United States. Service is provided via twenty-four fixed routes, which operate six days per week in the county and five days a week in nearby Warren, Ohio. In 2025, the system had a ridership of 2,029,300, or about 6,900 per weekday as of the first quarter of 2026. WRTA is fare-free and requires no type of fund to board.

== Routes ==
=== Youngstown Local Service ===
- 1 - Elm St
- 2 - Oak St
- 3 - Wilson Ave
- 4 - Steel St
- 5 - South Ave
- 6 - Fifth Ave
- 7 - Glenwood Ave
- 8 - Market St
- 9 - Austintown
- 10 - Belmont Ave
- 11 - Cornersburg
- 12 - Lansdowne Blvd
- 13 - McGuffey Rd
- 14 - Mosier
- 15 - Struthers
- 16 - Zedaker
- 27 - Austintown Loop
- 28 - Warren Express

The following routes run two buses on weekdays

7 - Glenwood Ave, 9 - Austintown, 10 - Belmont, 28 - Warren Express

=== Suburban Loops/Crosstowns ===
- 24 - Midlothian Blvd Crosstown
- 25 - Boardman/Canfield Loop
- 26 - Boardman East Loop

=== Express Services ===
28 Warren Express

== See also ==
- List of bus transit systems in the United States
