= Cache Valley (disambiguation) =

Cache Valley is a valley in Cache County, Utah and Franklin County, Idaho in the United States.

Cache Valley may also refer to:

- Cache Valley Railroad, a defunct Arkansas railroad
- Cache Valley virus, a member of the order Bunyavirales
