= Mary Logan =

Mary Logan may refer to:

- Mary Logan Reddick (1914–1966), American neuroembryologist and professor
- Mary Logan Tucker (1858–1940), American political activist
- Mary Phyllis Joan Logan, birth name of Concordia Merrel (1885–1962), English stage- and silent film actress, photographer's model, and author of romantic fiction
- Mary Simmerson Cunningham Logan (1838–1923), American writer and editor
