= Shiloh College =

- U.S. National Register of Historic Places
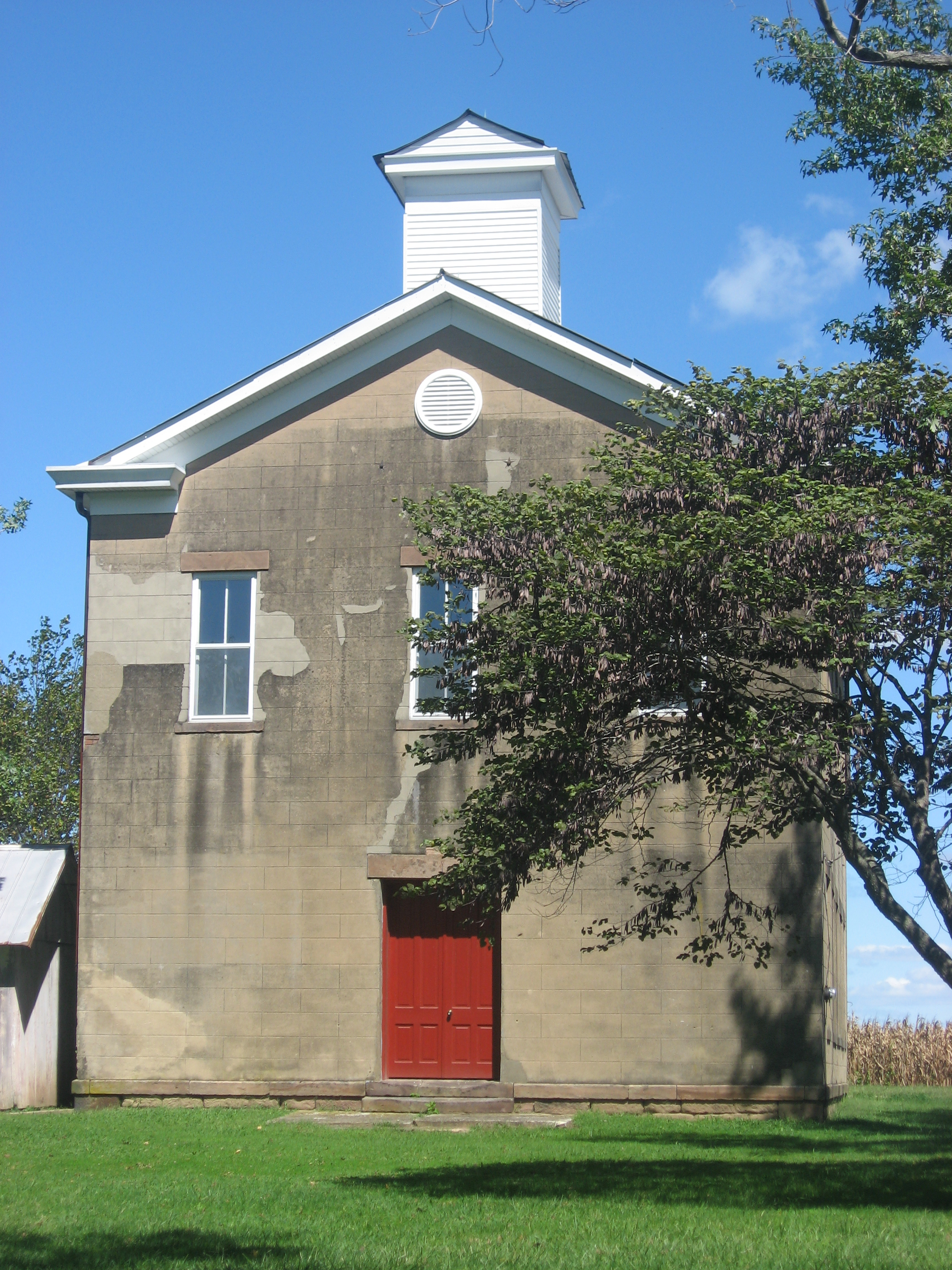

- Location within Illinois Location within the United States
- Location: 13043 Walnut St., Shiloh Hill, Illinois
- Coordinates: 37°55′36″N 89°37′12″W
- Area: less than one acre
- Built: 1881
- Built by: Brinkman, William F. & Bros.
- Architectural style: Greek Revival
- NRHP reference No.: 05001251
- Added to NRHP: November 15, 2005

Shiloh College is a historic school building located at 13043 Walnut Street in Shiloh Hill, Illinois.

Preparations for Shiloh College's founding began in 1836. In 1839, area residents purchased 80 acres for the school and the Illinois legislature officially incorporated the college. Shiloh College's students included John A. Logan, the future Civil War general, Congressman, candidate for Vice President, and founder of Memorial Day.

By 1896, the college was financially strapped, ceased operations, and leased the building to the Shiloh Hill school district. The building served as a public school until 1954, when the school was consolidated into Trico School District.

The only surviving building from Shiloh College is a Greek Revival building constructed in 1881. The building was added to the National Register of Historic Places on November 15, 2005. It is one of two one-room schoolhouses remaining in the Shiloh Hill area.

In 1998, the Randolph County Historical Society took ownership of the College building. In 2004, the Shiloh College Foundation was founded to support restoration of the college building.
