= John A. Logan =

American soldier and politician (1826–1886)

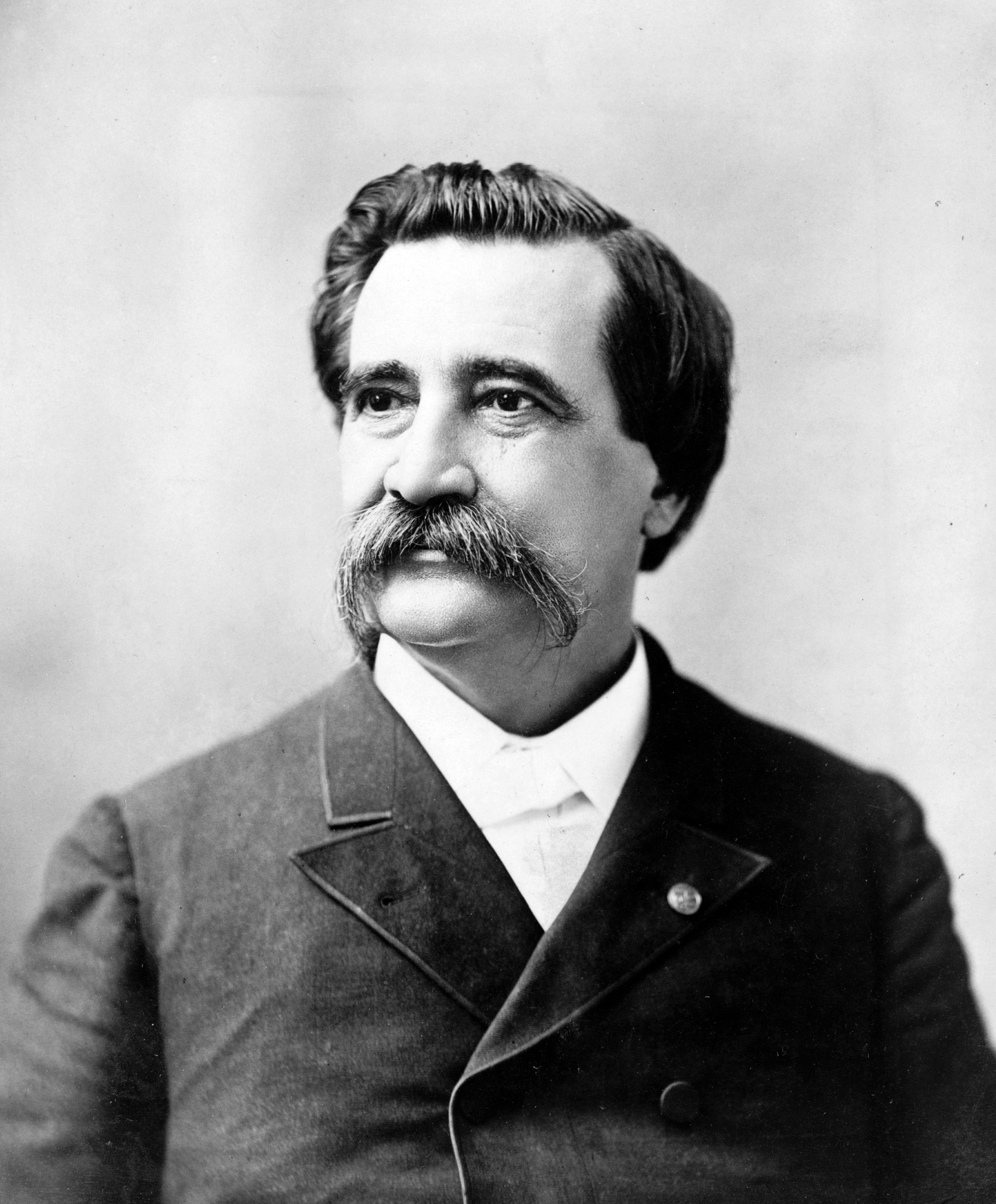
- Logan, c. 1880s

United States Senator from Illinois
- In office March 4, 1879 – December 26, 1886
- Preceded by: Richard Oglesby
- Succeeded by: Charles B. Farwell
- In office March 4, 1871 – March 3, 1877
- Preceded by: Richard Yates
- Succeeded by: David Davis

Member of the U.S. House of Representatives from Illinois's at-large district
- In office March 4, 1867 – March 3, 1871
- Preceded by: Samuel W. Moulton
- Succeeded by: John Lourie Beveridge

Member of the U.S. House of Representatives from Illinois's 9th district
- In office March 4, 1859 – April 2, 1862
- Preceded by: Samuel S. Marshall
- Succeeded by: William Allen

Member of the Illinois House of Representatives from the 5th district
- In office January 5, 1857 – January 3, 1859
- Preceded by: Thomas M. Sans
- Succeeded by: James Hampton
- In office January 3, 1853 – January 1, 1855
- Preceded by: Thomas M. Sans
- Succeeded by: Thomas M. Sans

Personal details
- Born: John Alexander Logan; February 9, 1826 Murphysboro, Illinois, U.S.
- Died: December 26, 1886 (aged 60) Washington, D.C., U.S.
- Resting place: United States Soldiers' and Airmen's Home National Cemetery
- Party: Democratic (before 1866); Republican (1866–1886)
- Spouse: Mary Simmerson Cunningham (m. 1855)
- Children: 3 (including John Jr. and Mary)
- Education: Shiloh College; University of Louisville (LLB)
- Nickname: "Black Jack"

Military service
- Allegiance: United States
- Branch/service: United States Army; Union Army
- Years of service: 1847–1848 (U.S. Army); 1861–1865 (Union Army)
- Rank: Major General
- Commands: XV Corps (1863-1864); Army of the Tennessee (July 22, 1864–July 27, 1864); XV Corps (1864-1865); Army of the Tennessee (May 19, 1865–August 1, 1865)
- Battles/wars: Mexican-American War; American Civil War • First Battle of Bull Run • Battle of Belmont • Battle of Fort Donelson • Second Battle of Corinth • Vicksburg Campaign • Battle of Atlanta • Battle of Jonesborough • Battle of Bentonville

John Alexander Logan (February 9, 1826 – December 26, 1886) was an American soldier and politician. He served in the Mexican–American War and was a general in the Union Army in the American Civil War. He served the state of Illinois as a state representative, a U.S. representative, and a U.S. senator and was an unsuccessful candidate for Vice President of the United States as James G. Blaine's running mate in the election of 1884. As the 3rd Commander-in-Chief of the Grand Army of the Republic, he is regarded as the most important figure in the movement to recognize Memorial Day (originally known as Decoration Day) as an official holiday.

His likeness appears on a statue at the center of Logan Circle, Washington, D.C. He is also honored with a statue in Grant Park in Chicago, Illinois. Memorial Park in Houston, Texas was formerly Camp Logan named after him. He is the namesake of Logan County, Illinois; Logan County, Kansas; Logan County, Nebraska; Logan County, Oklahoma; Logan County, Colorado; Logan County, North Dakota; and Logan Square, Chicago, which is the neighborhood chosen to mark Illinois' centennial. Logan is one of only three people mentioned by name in the Illinois state song. Upon his death, he lay in state in the United States Capitol rotunda. He is the father of U.S. Army officer and Medal of Honor recipient John Alexander Logan Jr. (1865–1899).

== Early life and political career ==
John A. Logan was born near what is now Murphysboro, Illinois, the son of Dr. John Logan and Dr. Logan's second wife, Elizabeth (Jenkins) Logan. He studied with his father and with a private tutor, then studied for three years at Shiloh College. He enlisted in the 1st Illinois Infantry for the Mexican–American War, and received a commission as a second lieutenant and assignment as the regimental quartermaster.

After the war Logan studied law in the office of his uncle, Alexander M. Jenkins, graduated from the Law Department of the University of Louisville in 1851, and practiced law with success.

John A. Logan entered politics as a Douglas Democrat, was elected county clerk in 1849, served in the Illinois House of Representatives from 1853 to 1854 and in 1857; and for a time, during the interval, was prosecuting attorney of the Third Judicial District of Illinois. In 1858 and 1860, he was elected as a Democrat to the U.S. House of Representatives. In 1853, John A. Logan helped pass a law which prohibited all African Americans, including freedmen, from settling in the state. The law was the first of Illinois' Black Laws, which were considered the harshest anti-Black laws to be passed in the North before the Civil War. Logan changed he views after serving in the Civil War and later became a champion of rights for African-Americans.

== Civil War ==
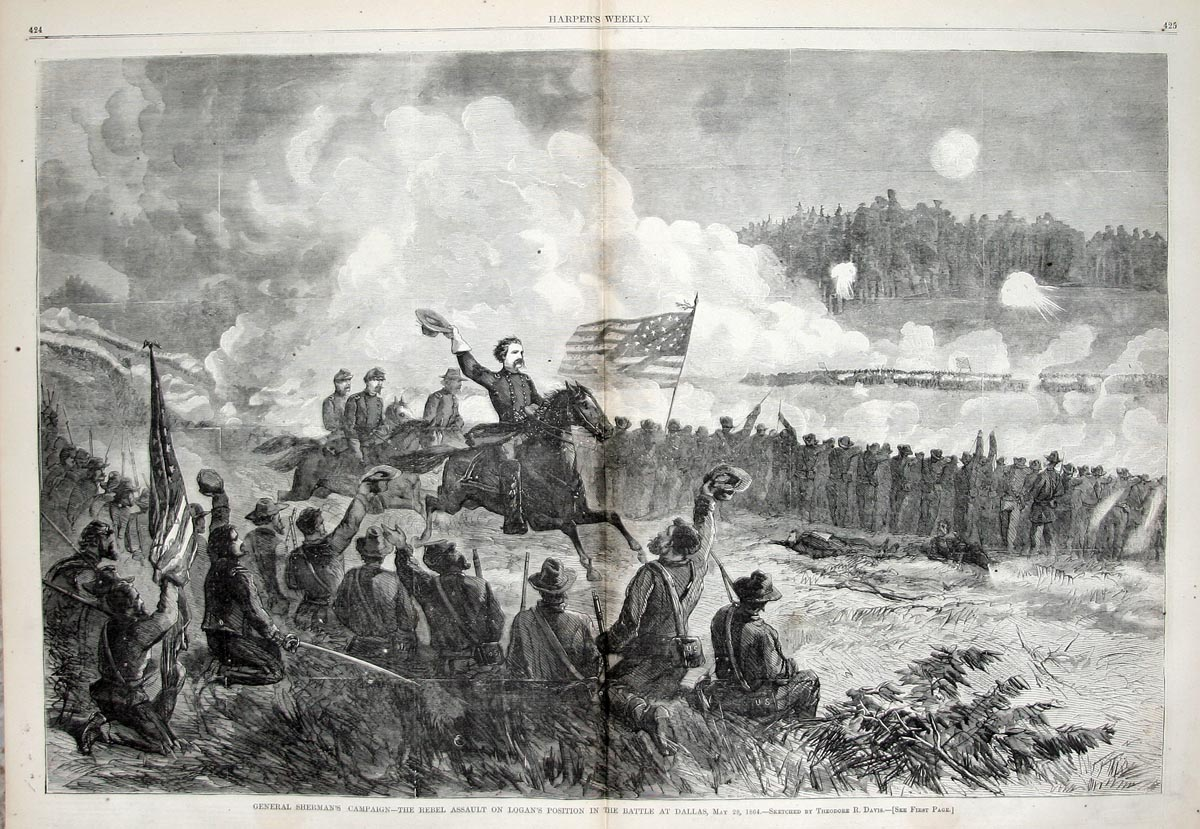
Logan at the Battle of Dallas, May 28, 1864

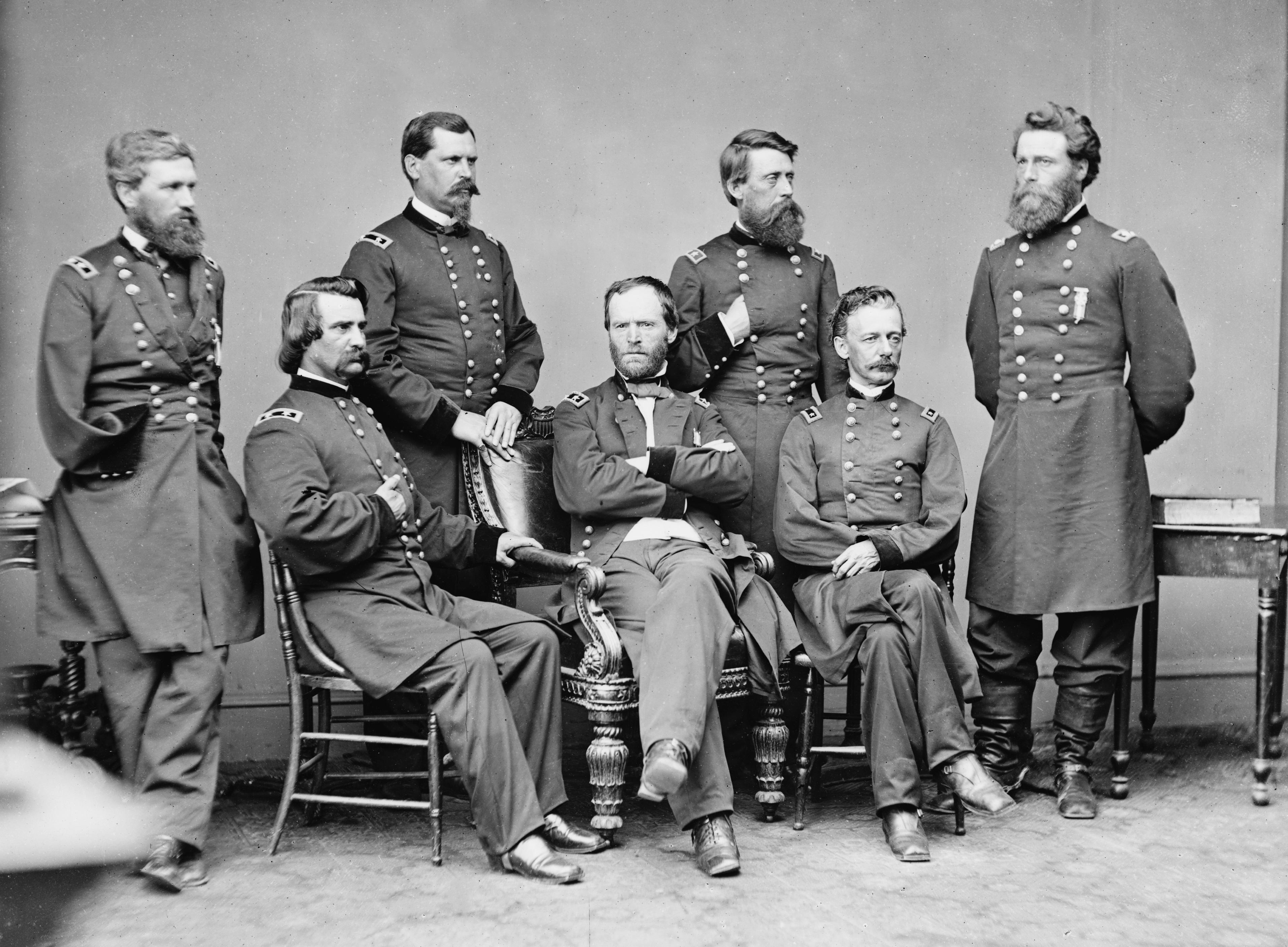
General John A. Logan on the staff of General William T. Sherman

U.S. Representative Logan fought at Bull Run as an unattached volunteer in the 2nd Michigan Infantry Regiment, and then returned to Washington where, before he resigned his congressional seat on April 2, 1862, he entered the Union Army as Colonel of the 31st Illinois Volunteer Infantry Regiment, which he organized. He was known by his soldiers as "Black Jack" because of his black eyes and hair and swarthy complexion, and was regarded as one of the most able officers to enter the army from civilian life. In a time when political generals usually performed poorly in battle, Logan was an exception.

Before resigning his seat, Union Army Colonel Logan served in the army of Ulysses S. Grant in the Western Theater and was present at the Battle of Belmont on November 7, 1861, where his horse was killed, and at Fort Donelson, where he was wounded on February 15, 1862. Soon after the victory at Donelson, he resigned his seat on April 2, 1862, and was promoted to brigadier general in the volunteers, as of March 21, 1862. Major John Hotaling served as his chief of staff. To confuse matters, the 32nd Illinois was commanded at Shiloh by a different Colonel John Logan. During the Siege of Corinth, John A. Logan commanded first a brigade and then the 1st Division of the Army of the Tennessee. In the spring of 1863, he was promoted to major general to rank from November 29, 1862.

In Grant's Vicksburg Campaign, Logan commanded the 3rd Division of James B. McPherson's XVII Corps, which was the first to enter the city of Vicksburg in July 1863 after its capture. Logan then served as the city's military governor. In November 1863 he succeeded William Tecumseh Sherman in command of the XV Corps; and at the Battle of Atlanta (July 22, 1864), after the death of James B. McPherson during the day, he assumed command of the Army of the Tennessee. He was relieved a short time afterward by Oliver O. Howard. He returned to Illinois for the 1864 elections but rejoined the army afterward and commanded his XV corps in Sherman's Carolinas campaign.

In December 1864, Grant became impatient with George H. Thomas's apparent unwillingness to attack immediately at Nashville and sent Logan to relieve him. Logan was stopped in Louisville when news came that Thomas had completely smashed John Bell Hood's Confederate army in the Battle of Nashville.

Logan had been disappointed when Howard was given permanent command of the Army of the Tennessee after McPherson's death, and Sherman arranged for Logan to lead the army during the May 1865 Grand Review in Washington.

== Post-war political career ==
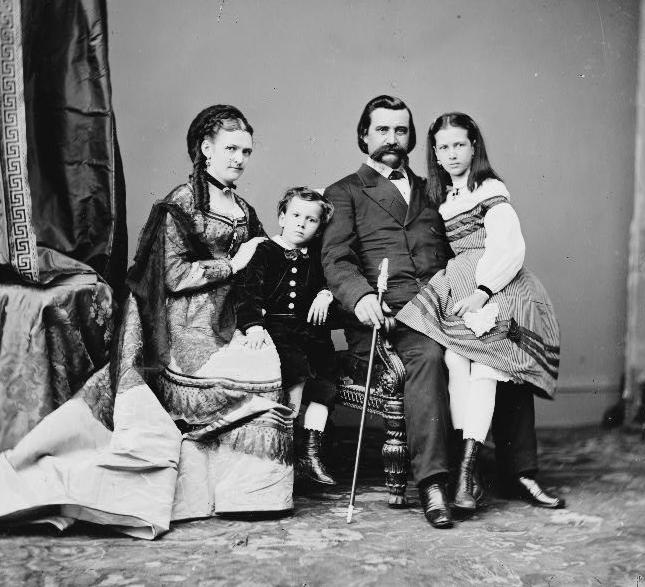
Logan with his wife Mary Simmerson Cunningham Logan, son Manning Alexander Logan and daughter Mary Elizabeth "Dollie" Logan in about 1870

After the war, Logan resumed his political career, now as a Republican, and was a member of the United States House of Representatives from 1867 to 1871, and of the United States Senate from 1871 until 1877 and again from 1879 until his death in 1886. After the war, Logan, who had always been a staunch partisan, was identified with the radical wing of the Republican Party. His forceful, passionate speaking, popular on the platform, was less effective in the halls of legislation. In 1868, he was one of the House managers in the impeachment trial of U.S. President Andrew Johnson. One of Logan's issues in the Senate was his efforts to stop any action taken to overturn the conviction in the court-martial of Maj. Gen. Fitz John Porter.

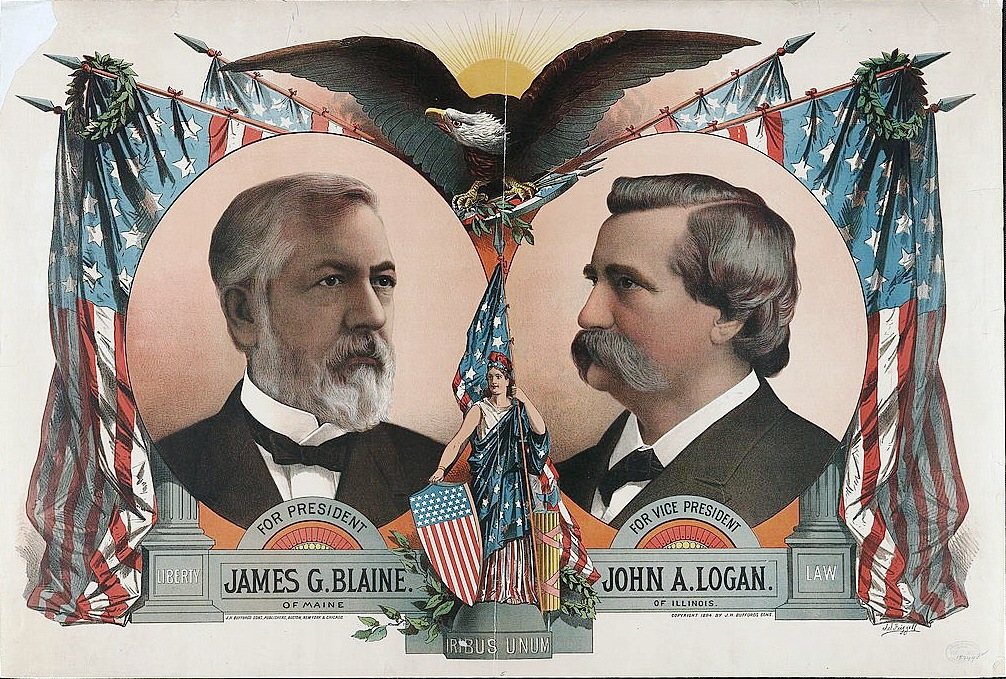
Blaine/Logan campaign poster

He was the third Commander-in-Chief of the Grand Army of the Republic from 1868 to 1871 and helped lead the call for creation of Memorial Day, originally called Decoration Day, as a national public holiday. His war record and his great personal following, especially among members of the Grand Army of the Republic, contributed to his nomination for Vice President in 1884 on the Republican ticket with James G. Blaine. However, they were defeated by the Democratic ticket of Grover Cleveland and Thomas A. Hendricks.

Logan was deeply embittered by the loss. He believed that President Chester A. Arthur’s supporters were disloyal after Arthur lost the Republican nomination. Logan obstructed Arthur’s nomination of journalist William Eleroy Curtis to be Secretary of the Latin American Trade Commission, claiming that Curtis made “damaging disclosures… to the Democratic National Committee.” Curtis threatened to mobilize his press resources against Logan's re-election bid. The controversy eventually dissipated. The 1885 US Senate election in Illinois was contentious, and Logan only won after a Democratic representative died and was replaced with a Republican.

=== Credit Mobilier Scandal ===
In September 1872, the New York newspaper The Sun reported that many major politicians were bribed by Union Pacific Railroad, and Credit Mobilier. In response to this Congress created the Poland Committee to investigate these accusations. The committee found out that many senators including Logan were involved. In February 1873, the House was convinced that it should share this information with the Senate. The House said to the Senate that these politicians including Logan were possibly involved with the scandal.

Logan explained that he rejected The Credit Mobilier official Oakes Ames first offer, but a few months later Logan accepted Ames offer of 325 dollars. Logan was exonerated by the committee report.

== Death ==
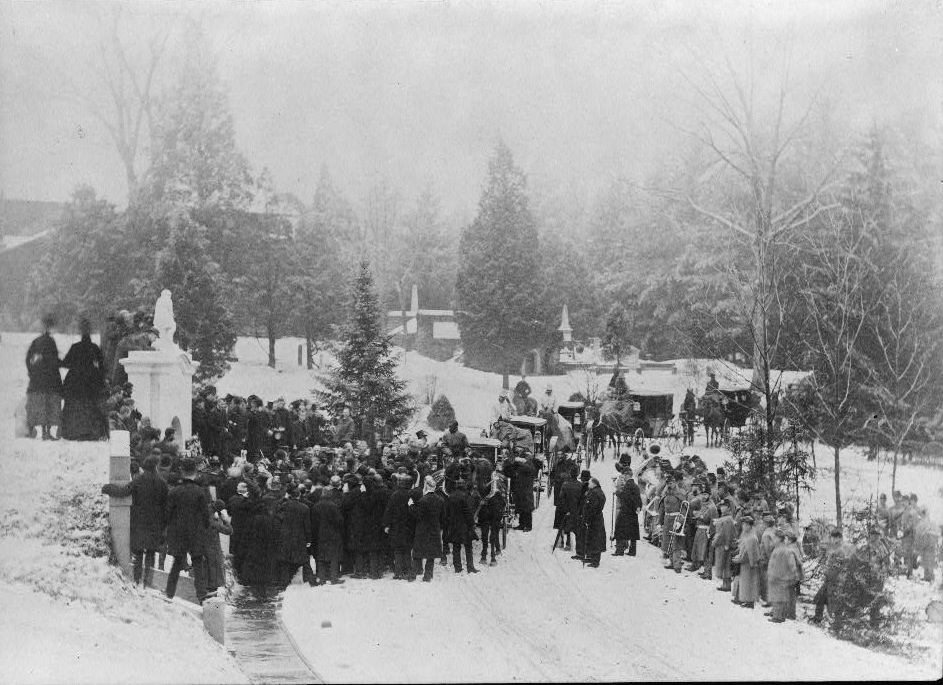
John A. Logan's funeral at Hutchinson's vault

Logan showed signs of illness when the 49th United States Congress opened its first official session on December 7, 1886. By mid-December, Logan's arms swelled and his lower limbs were in pain. After several days of intense discomfort, the ailment subsided. He relapsed a few days later and eventually struggled to maintain consciousness. On December 24, Logan's doctors conceded that the condition might be fatal. Around three o'clock in the afternoon on December 26, Logan died at his home in Columbia Heights, Washington, D.C. After his death, Logan's body lay in state in the United States Capitol. He was temporarily interred in a vault at Rock Creek Cemetery on December 31, 1886 until he could be reburied in a newly constructed mortuary chapel at the United States Soldiers' and Airmen's Home National Cemetery in Washington on December 26, 1888, the second anniversary of his death.

== Published books ==
Logan was the author of two books on the Civil War. In The Great Conspiracy: Its Origin and History (1886), he sought to demonstrate that secession and the Civil War were the result of a long-contemplated "conspiracy" to which various Southern politicians had been party since the Nullification Crisis; he also vindicated the pre-war political positions of Stephen A. Douglas and himself. He also wrote The Volunteer Soldier of America (1887). His son, John Alexander Logan Jr., was also an army officer and posthumously received the Medal of Honor for actions during the Philippine–American War. His brother-in-law, Cyrus Thomas, participated in the Hayden Geological Survey of 1871.

Logan was also a member of the Sons of the American Revolution and the Military Order of the Loyal Legion of the United States - a military society which was composed of officers who had served in the Union armed forces during the American Civil War.

== Family ==
Logan was related to Cornelius Ambrosius Logan (1806–1853), the Irish-American actor and playwright, possibly as a first cousin. John Logan adopted Cornelius' daughter Kate (1847–1872), probably in 1866. Cornelius' son Cornelius Ambrose Logan, a physician and diplomat, wrote a memoir of John Logan which was included in his The Volunteer Soldier of America.

== Legacy ==
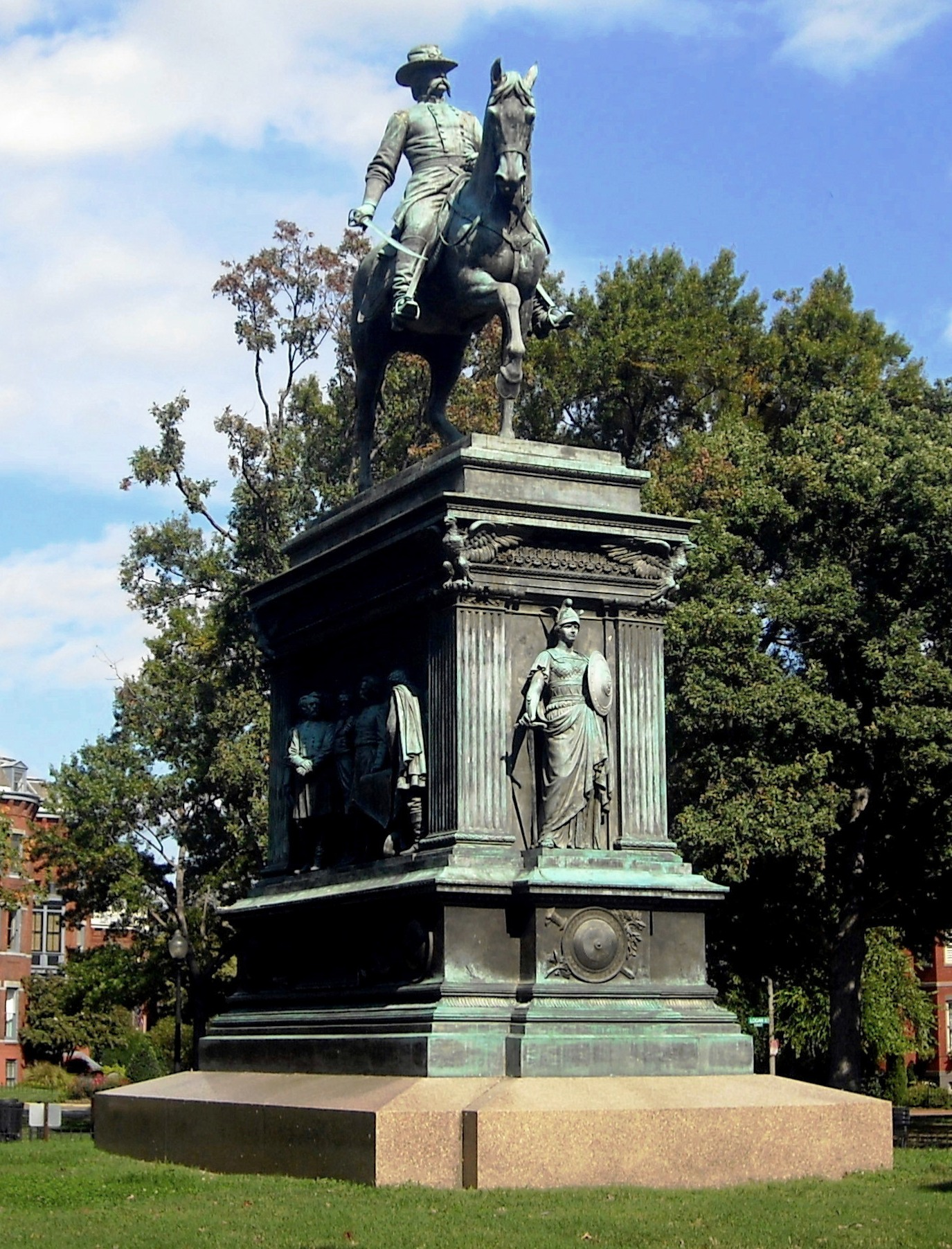
Logan monument in Logan Circle, Washington, D.C.

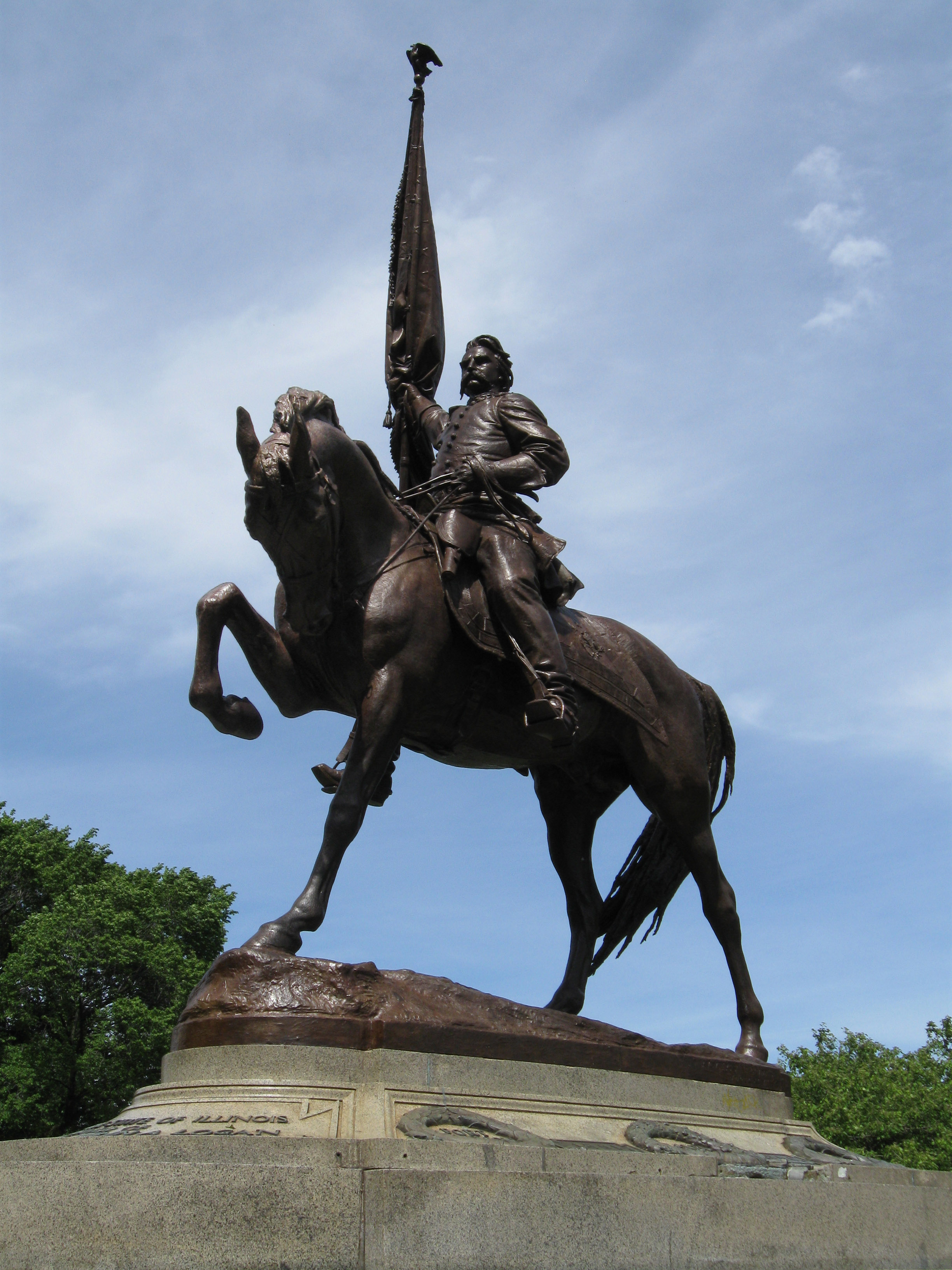
General John Logan Memorial statue in Grant Park, Chicago, Illinois

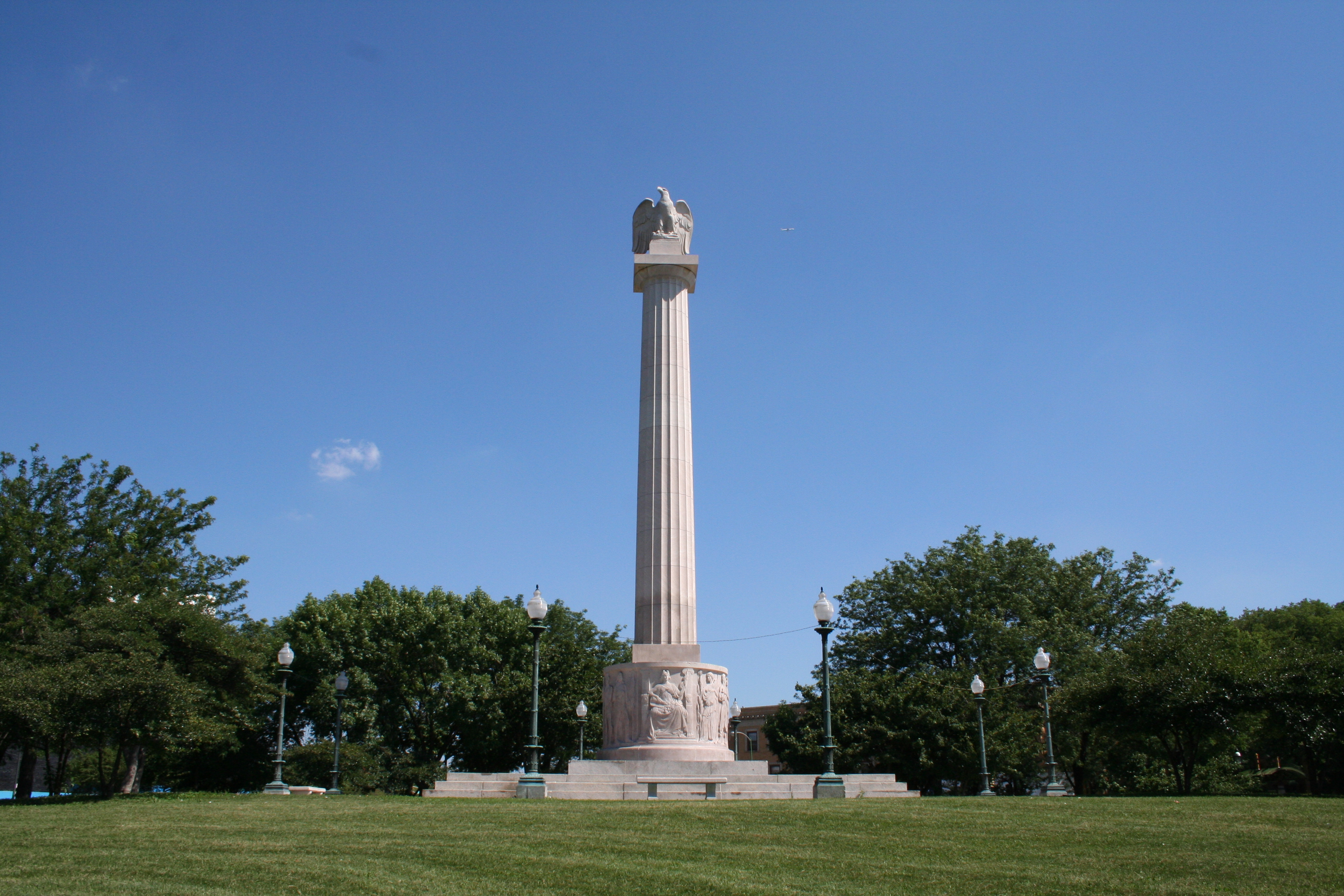
The Illinois Centennial Memorial Column rests in the center of Logan Square

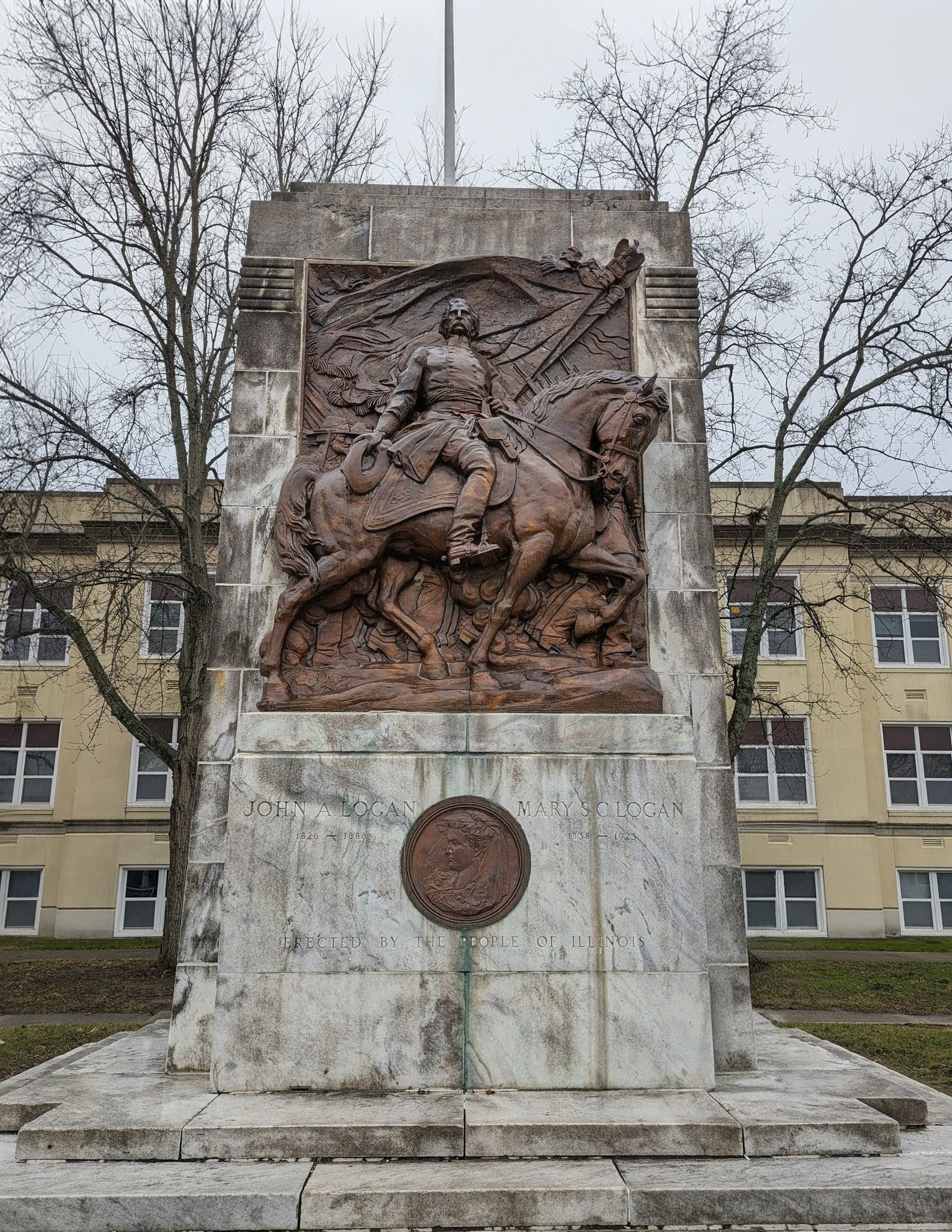
Statue of Logan at Murphysboro Middle School in his hometown of Murphysboro, Illinois.

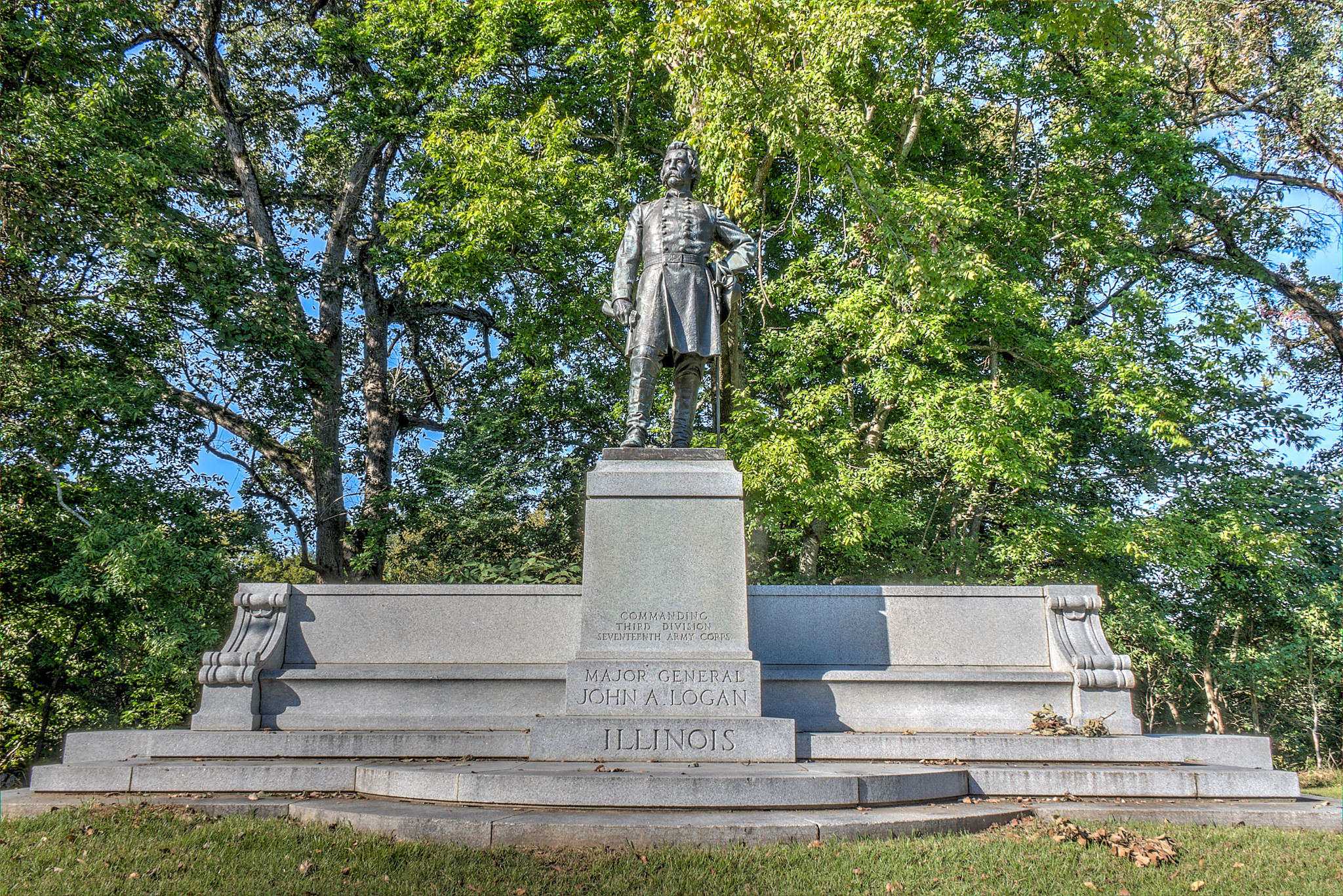
Statue of Logan at by Leonard Crunelle at Vicksburg National Military Park

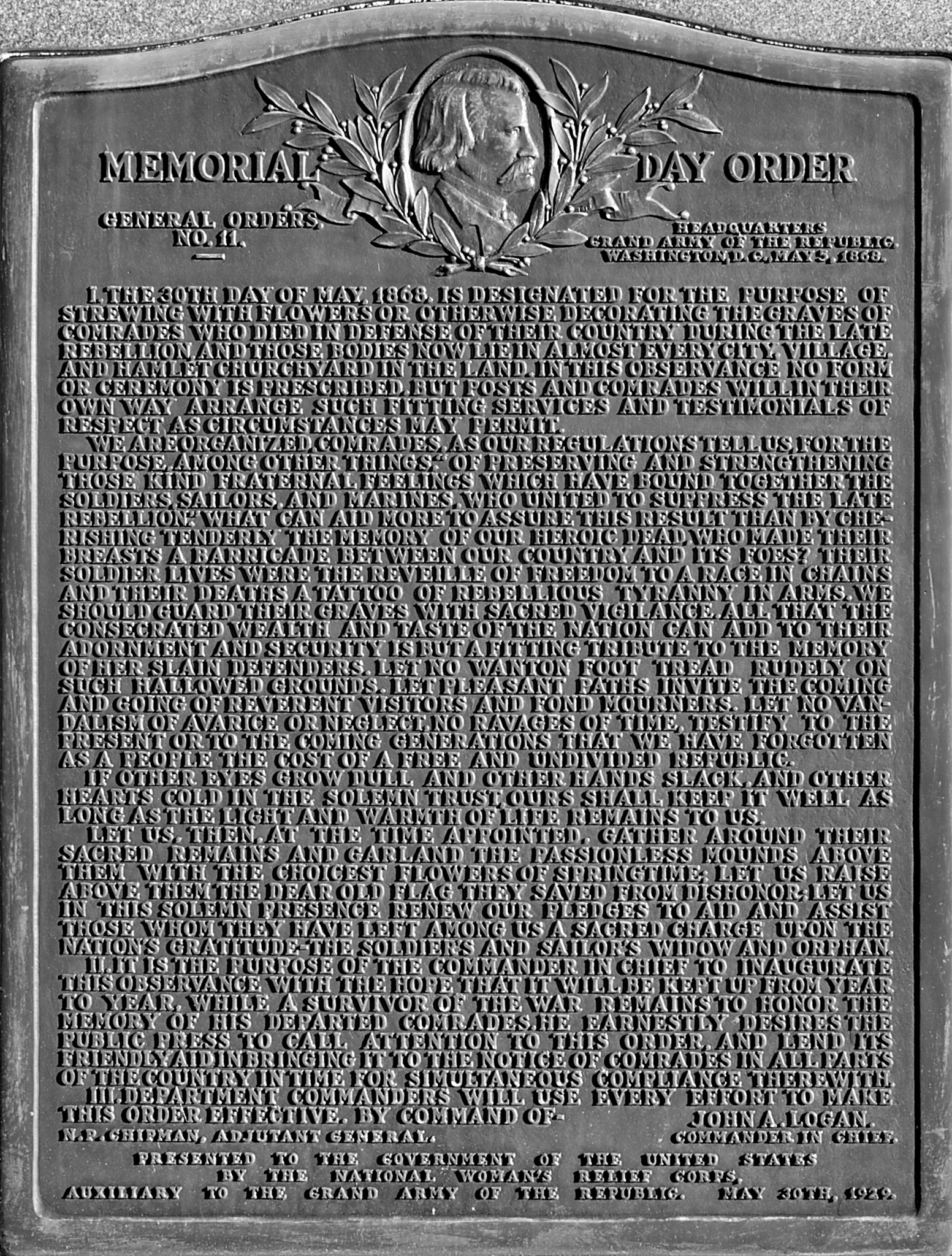
Logan's Memorial Day order at Andersonville National Historic Site

The State of Illinois commissioned an equestrian statue of the general that now stands in Chicago's Grant Park. Another equestrian statue stands in Logan Circle in Washington, D.C., which gives its name to the surrounding neighborhood. At #4 Logan Circle, a former Logan residence, now called John Logan House, displays a variety of exterior and interior plaques to celebrate Logan's achievements as soldier and statesman.

Logan Square, Chicago and Logan Boulevard in Chicago are named after him, as well as Logan Avenue and the neighborhood of Logan Heights (aka Barrio Logan) in San Diego, and the community of Logan Township, New Jersey. His hometown, Murphysboro, Illinois, is home to the General John A. Logan Museum, as well as the General John A. Logan Elementary School; and, in nearby Carterville, Illinois, there is the John A. Logan College, a community college. Camp Logan, Illinois, an Illinois National Guard base and rifle range from 1892 to the early 1970s, was also named for him. John A. Logan Elementary School in Washington, DC is also named in his honor.

The United States Army Transport Logan was named after him.

Logan is one of only three individuals mentioned by name in the Illinois state song:

On the record of thy years,
Abraham Lincoln's name appears,
Grant and Logan, and our tears,
Illinois, Illinois,
Grant and Logan, and our tears,
Illinois.

- Logan County, Illinois, was named after Logan's father, Dr. John Logan, an early pioneer physician.
- Logan County, Colorado, is named in his honor. The city of Sterling is the county seat.
- Logan County, Kansas was named after General Logan.
- Logan County, Nebraska, many of whose early settlers were Civil War veterans, is named after Logan.
- Logan County, North Dakota, is named in his honor. The city of Napoleon is the county seat.
- Logan County, Oklahoma, is named in his honor. The city of Guthrie is the county seat.
- Logan was at one time honored with the naming of a street in Lansing, Michigan. Community activists persuaded the city council to co-rename the street as Martin Luther King Boulevard in 1991. Logan's name was dropped completely a few years later. See Capitol Loop#Street name changes
- John A. Logan College in Carterville, Illinois is named in his honor.
- Logan Junior High School in Princeton, Illinois is named in his honor.
- Logan High School in La Crosse, Wisconsin is named in his honor.
- The Logan House in Wilmington, Delaware is the oldest Irish Pub in the state and named in his honor.
- Ft. Logan National Cemetery established 1887 in Denver, Colorado is named after him.
- Logan's final resting place at the U.S. Soldiers' and Airmen's Home National Cemetery is a granite, Norman-style mausoleum, designed by the former supervising architect of the U.S. Treasury Department, Alfred B. Mullett, which houses the remains of General John A. Logan; his wife, Mary S. Logan; daughter, Mary Logan Tucker; and grandsons, Captain Logan Tucker and George E. Tucker.

== Publications about Logan ==
- Andrews, Byron (1884). A Biography of Gen. John A. Logan: With an Account of His Public Services in Peace and in War. New York: H.S. Goodspeed. OCLC 11321584.

== See also ==
- List of American Civil War generals (Union)
- List of Grand Army of the Republic commanders-in-chief
- List of members of the United States Congress who died in office (1790–1899)

== Notes ==
U.S. House of Representatives
| Preceded by Samuel S. Marshall | Member of the U.S. House of Representatives from Illinois's 9th congressional district 1859–1862 | Succeeded by William Allen |
| Preceded by Samuel W. Moulton | Member of the U.S. House of Representatives from Illinois's at-large congressional district 1867–1871 | Succeeded by John Lourie Beveridge |
| Preceded by James A. Garfield | Chair of the House Armed Services Committee; 1869–1871 | Succeeded by John Coburn |
Military offices
| Preceded by Stephen A. Hurlbut | Commander-in-Chief of the Grand Army of the Republic; 1868–1871 | Succeeded by Ambrose Burnside |
U.S. Senate
| Preceded by Richard Yates | U.S. Senator (Class 2) from Illinois; 1871–1877; Served alongside: Lyman Trumbull, Richard Oglesby | Succeeded by David Davis |
| Preceded by Henry Wilson | Chair of the Senate Armed Services Committee; 1872–1877 | Succeeded by George E. Spencer |
| Preceded by Richard Oglesby | U.S. Senator (Class 2) from Illinois; 1879–1886; Served alongside: David Davis, Shelby Cullom | Succeeded by Charles B. Farwell |
| Preceded by Theodore Randolph | Chair of the Senate Armed Services Committee; 1881–1886 | Succeeded by William Joyce Sewell |
Party political offices
| Preceded by Chester A. Arthur | Republican nominee for Vice President of the United States; 1884 | Succeeded by Levi P. Morton |
Honorary titles
| Preceded by James Garfield | Persons who have lain in state or honor in the United States Capitol rotunda December 30–31, 1886 | Succeeded by William McKinley |
