= George Tod (judge) =

American judge (1773–1841)

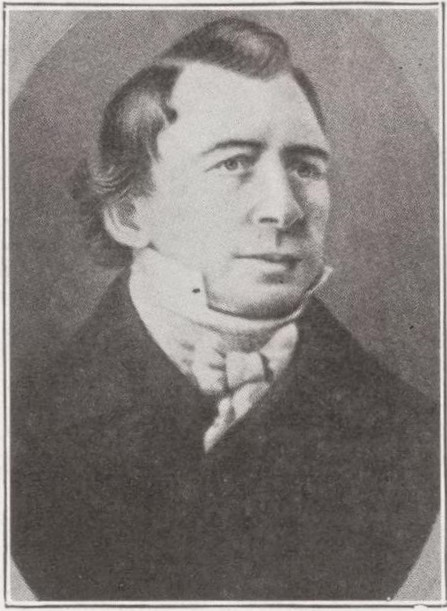

Associate Justice of the Ohio Supreme Court
- In office May 13, 1806 – February 10, 1810
- Appointed by: Edward Tiffin
- Preceded by: William Sprigg
- Succeeded by: Ethan Allen Brown

Personal details
- Born: December 11, 1773 Suffield, Connecticut
- Died: April 11, 1841 (aged 67) Brier Hill, Youngstown, Ohio
- Resting place: Oak Hill Cemetery (Youngstown, Ohio)
- Spouse: Sallie Isaacs
- Children: five
- Education: Yale University; Litchfield Law School

Military service
- Allegiance: United States
- Branch/service: United States Army
- Rank: Lieutenant colonel
- Battles/wars: War of 1812

George Tod (December 11, 1773 – April 11, 1841) was an American politician, jurist and soldier who was a senator in the Ohio State Senate, and an Ohio Supreme Court Judge (1806-1810). He fought in the War of 1812.

== Early life ==
Tod was born in Suffield, Connecticut, and graduated from Yale in 1797. He taught school, studied law at Litchfield Law School, and was admitted to the bar in Connecticut. He married Sallie Isaacs in 1797. She was sister in law of Governor Ingersoll. Children Charlotte and Jonathan were born in Connecticut. In 1808, he took on as an apprentice, the young Jesse Root Grant, the future father of Ulysses S. Grant, for four years.

== The West ==
Tod came to the Western Reserve in 1800. He was appointed Prosecuting Attorney of Trumbull County that year. He was a township clerk 1802-1804. Tod was elected to the Ohio Senate for the third and fourth General Assemblies, 1804-1806. In 1806 the Ohio Legislature appointed him a judge of the Ohio Supreme Court.

== Impeachment ==
While Calvin Pease was judge of the Third Circuit, the Ohio Legislature passed a law that "justices of the peace should have jurisdiction in civil cases to the amount of $50, without the right of trial by jury." In Rutherford v. M'Fadden, Pease held that this was in conflict with the United States Constitution, which stated "in suits of common law when the value shall exceed $20, the right of trial by jury shall be preserved," and the State Constitution, which stated "the right of trial by jury shall be inviolate." This decision established judicial review of legislative decisions. Supreme Court Judges George Tod and Samuel Huntington upheld Pease's decision. Pease and Tod were impeached by the legislature. Huntington was not impeached because he had already been elected governor and would resign his seat by the wend of the year. Pease and Tod were each acquitted in their impeachment trials by a single vote. One author says "From that day, the right of the Supreme Court to pass on the constitutionality of laws has seldom even been questioned." Another says "The Ohio legislature, however, would continue to try to establish itself as the dominant force in state government at the expense of the judicial branch." The legislature voted to end all judicial terms in 1810.

== Post-impeachment ==
Tod was elected to the Ohio Senate again in the 9th and tenth General Assembly, 1810-1812 In the War of 1812, Tod served as a lieutenant-colonel including action at Fort Meigs. After the war, he was a Common Pleas judge from 1815 to 1829, and prosecuting attorney for one term. He died in 1841. He died at his farm called Brier Hill and was buried at Oak Hill Cemetery in Youngstown. His wife died September 29, 1847, at Brier Hill, and was buried with him.

Tod's son, David Tod was born in 1805, and went on to be Civil War-era governor of Ohio. George and Sallie Tod had five children.

Ohio Senate
| Preceded by Benjamin Tappan | Senator from Trumbull County; 1804-1806 | Succeeded by Calvin Cone |
| Preceded by Calvin Cone | Senator from Trumbull County; 1810-1812 | Succeeded by Calvin Pease |
