= Oak Hill Cemetery (Youngstown, Ohio) =

Historic rural cemetery

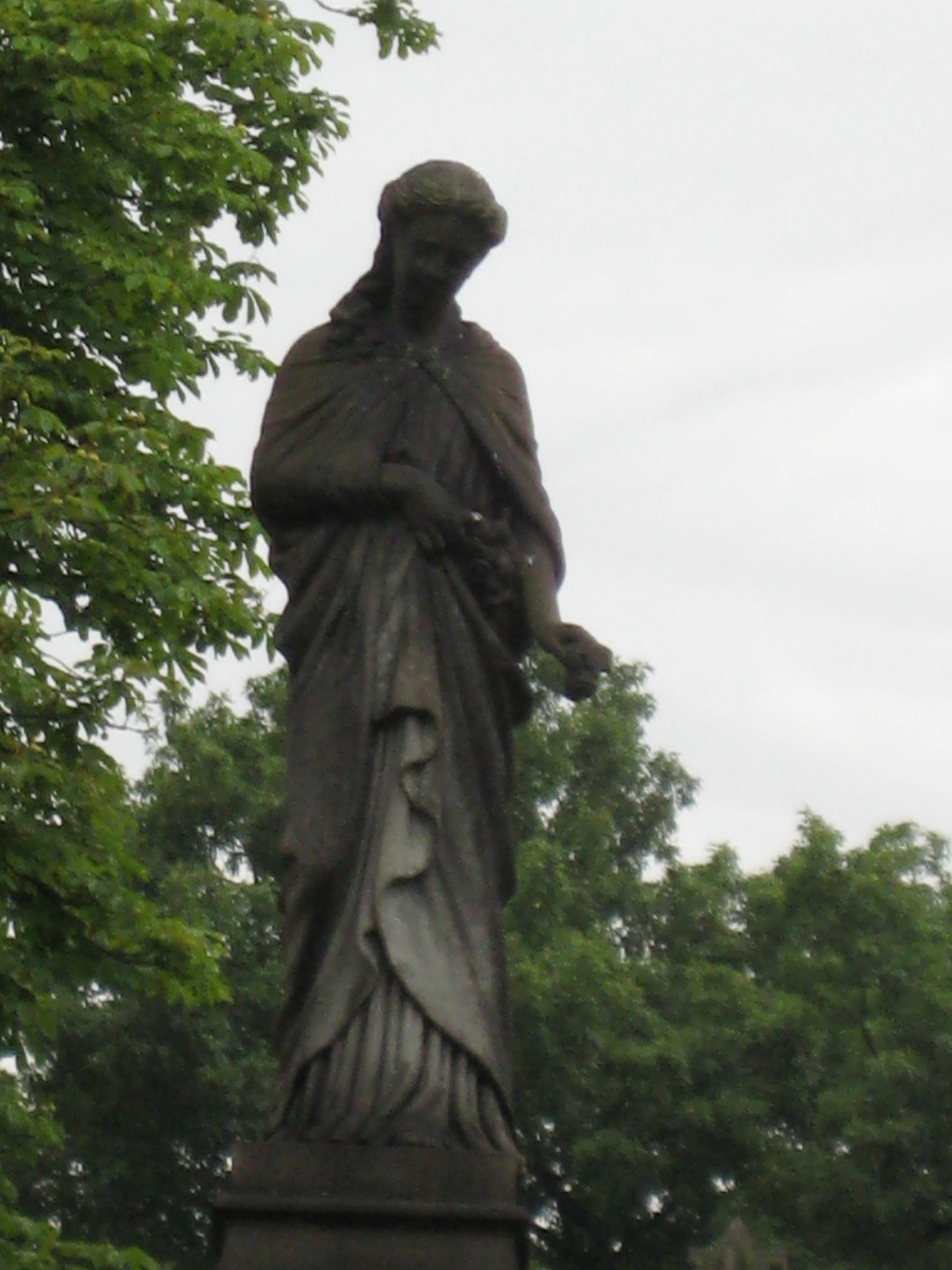
- Oak Hill Cemetery Statue
- Formation: 1854
- Founder: Mahoning Valley Cemetery Association
- Location: Youngstown, Ohio, United States
- Coordinates: 41°05′46″N 80°39′36″W

Oak Hill Cemetery is a place of burial located in Youngstown, Ohio. It is a garden style cemetery (also known as a Rural cemetery) featuring memorials to multiple notable figures. The cemetery was formed after the Mahoning Valley Cemetery Association purchased the land in 1853 from Dr. Henry Manning, a local physician who is himself buried within the cemetery. The cemetery was formally established in 1854. The cemetery began an endowment fund in 1922 that lead to it becoming one of the most endowed cemeteries, measured by dollar per acre, in the state of Ohio. Many of the original cemeteries within the city, then still the Village of Youngstown, had their interments moved to Oak Hill Cemetery. Many of Youngstown's first settlers are buried here, including Daniel Sheehy and Colonel James Hillman.

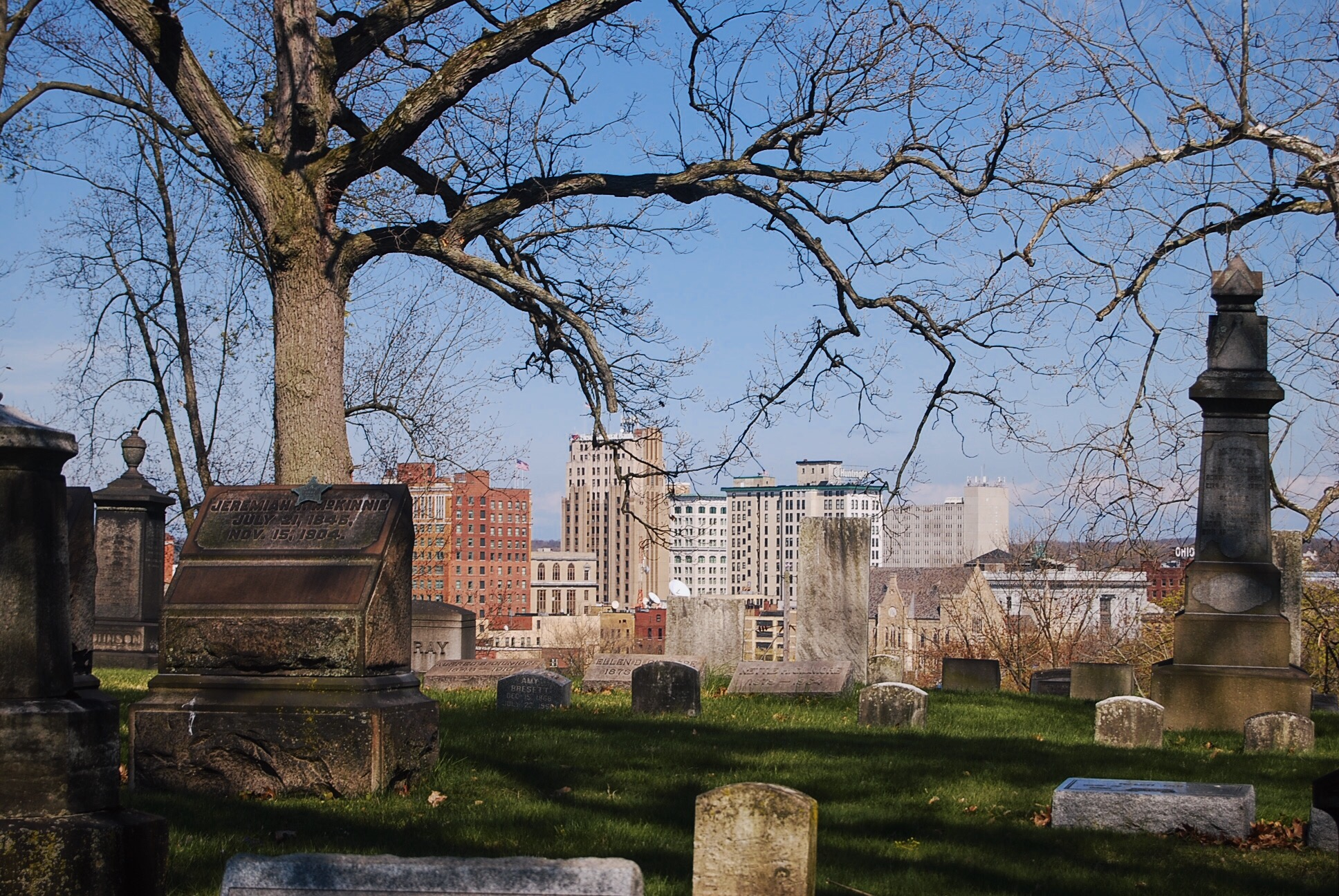
Photo taken from inside the cemetery

== History ==
=== Youngstown Township Cemetery ===
The Youngstown Township cemetery was formed in 1856 from three acres of land adjacent to Oak Hill Cemetery. Dr. Henry Manning again was the owner of the land. In 1924, Oak Hill Cemetery was given management and eventually subsumed the Youngstown Township Cemetery, which is located in the northwest section of Oak Hill Cemetery.

=== The Grounds ===
After the endowment of the cemetery in 1922, many improvements were made to achieve the garden style of the landscape desired. Warren H. Manning, known for his "wild garden" designs was commissioned as the landscape designer. During the early 1900s, the cemetery was improved through the addition of Macadam roads, an eleven foot tall fence surrounding the entire perimeter, and the plating of hundreds of trees and shrubs. The cemetery's entrance now has granite gates, which were added in 1962.

== Notable Interments ==
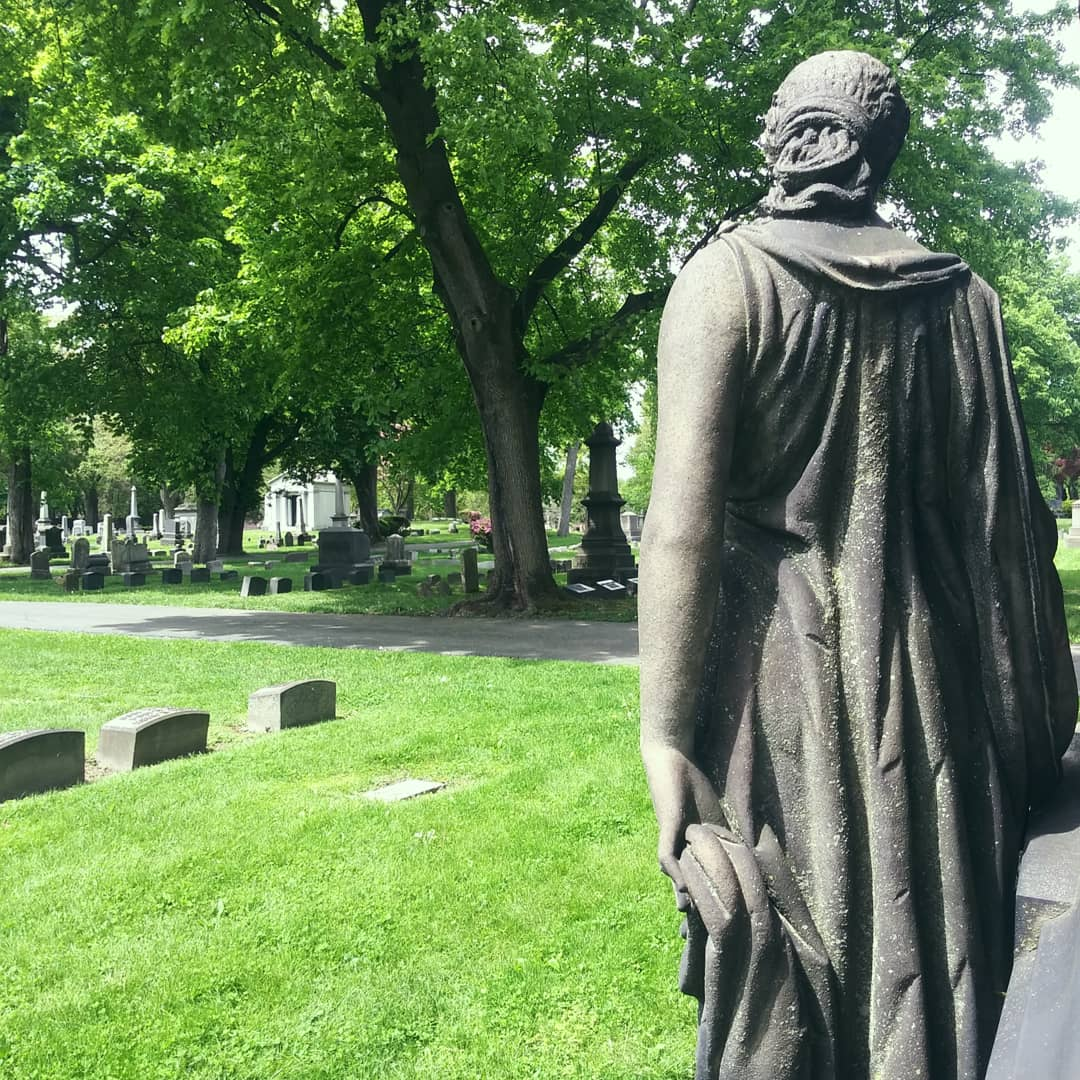
Photo taken from the Wick family plot

- P. Ross Berry, master builder and architect
- John Van Fleet, member of the Underground Railroad
- Caroline Bonnell Jones, Titanic survivor
- John Alexander Logan Jr., army officer and MOH recipient
- Jimmy McAleer, baseball player and manager
- Joseph A. McDonald, steel industrialist
- John D. Reese, "Baseball doctor"
- W. Aubrey Thomas, Ohio Representative
- David Tod, 25th governor of Ohio
- George Tod (judge), Ohio senator and Ohio Supreme Court judge
- George Dennick Wick, industrialist and Titanic victim
- Mary Hitchcock Wick, Titanic survivor
