= John D. Reese =

Welsh-born American baseball trainer (1855–1931)

"Bonesetter" Reese
- Born: May 6, 1855 (United Kingdom) Rhymney, Wales
- Died: November 29, 1931; Youngstown, Ohio

John D. "Bonesetter" Reese (May 6, 1855 – November 29, 1931) was a Welsh-born American athletic trainer in early 20th-century Major League Baseball who was known for his ability to get injured athletes "back in the game". Although he gained wide visibility as the nation's "baseball doctor", Reese reportedly "drew no line between rich and poor patients".

During his long career, the Welsh-born Reese delivered therapy to clients including industrial workers, celebrity athletes, and heads of state. His work brought him considerable recognition within the Welsh-American community during his later years.

At the time of his death, Reese was regarded as a national figure, and his death was marked by The New York Times, which printed a detailed obituary.

== Early life and career ==
Reese was born in Rhymney, Wales, to a coal miner who died while Reese was an infant. He was orphaned by the death of his mother a decade later and went to work at the Welsh ironworks. Reese was taken in by an ironworker named Tom Jones, who taught him the trade of "bonesetting", a term the Welsh used for treatment of strains of muscle and tendon, not the setting of broken bones. Jones trained Reese until Reese left for the United States in January 1887.

Reese became a coal miner and then roller's helper at Jones & Laughlin Steel in Pittsburgh, Pennsylvania. He later moved to Youngstown, Ohio, where he took a job at the Brown-Bonnell Mills. Within a few years, he assumed the skilled position of "roller" at the Mahoning Valley Iron Company. There, his skills as a healer came to the attention of one of the mill's administrators, James A. Campbell, who later became chairman of the board of the Youngstown Sheet and Tube Company. Campbell encouraged Reese to pursue his medical career full-time. Reese attended Case University (now Case Western Reserve University) in Cleveland for three weeks before discontinuing his formal studies in medicine. Despite his lack of formal credentials, Reese's practice continued to grow.

== Later career ==
Reese's viewed his involvement with baseball players as a sideline. He preferred baseball players but worked with other athletes. The primary focus of his practice was treating his one-time colleagues, the mill workers of Youngstown. Reese's unique ability to manipulate muscles and ligaments put working men and ballplayers alike back to work, giving him the reputation of "miracle" worker in some circles.

By the 1920s, Reese was a national phenomenon. As Time magazine wrote: "His deft fingers developed Reese into an outstanding and nationally famed expert at rehabilitating errant bones. Especially desired is he of athletes–precious professionals require the delicate care of specialists, hardy amateurs must please the alumni regularly–and many a sports luminary has hastened to Reese as a Good Samaritan". His group of patients included baseball players Cy Young, Ty Cobb, Rogers Hornsby, Walter Johnson, and John McGraw. But Reese also treated international leaders such as fellow Welshman Lloyd George.

Yet, Reese's growing celebrity never distracted him from the essentially humanitarian nature of his vocation. His compassionate and egalitarian approach to medical care was conveyed in a brief article that appeared in a local newspaper about a year before his death. The article stated: "Athletes, theatrical people, rich men, poor men, bakermen, and no, not thieves, but others, in all walks of life have made their way to the home of John D. Reese to have him lay his healing hands on their broken bodies, and restore them to health and usefulness".

A respected figure within the Welsh-American community, Reese became the recipient of the highest honor bestowed by the American Gorsedd. On June 26, 1926, he was invested with the Druidic degree in an Eisteddfod ceremony held at Youngstown's Wick Park. A local newspaper reported that the event marked "the first time this degree had been conferred in this country". The ceremony was reportedly "a survival of the days of the Druids in Wales".

== Personal life ==
Reese and his wife, Sarah, comfortably raised five daughters: Mary Ann, Sarah, Gertrude, Elizabeth and Kathryn. Sarah (his wife) died in 1911.

== Death and legacy ==
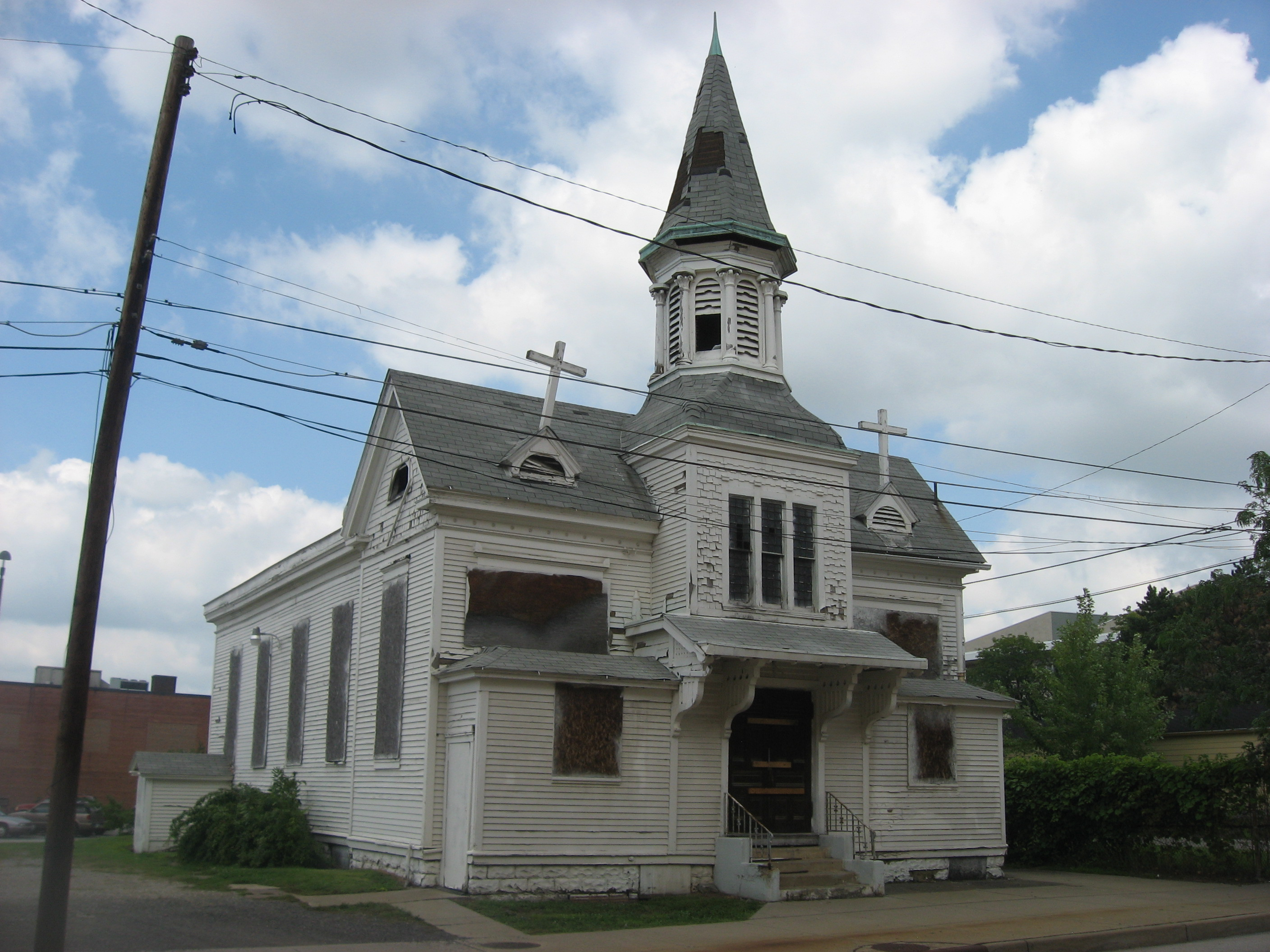
Youngstown's Welsh Congregational Church

Reese died in 1931, at his large residence on Youngstown's North Side. He was 76 years old. His death was noted in a front-page article that appeared in the Youngstown Vindicator. Reese's obituary observed that he treated patients as they came in and added that the famous often were forced to stand in line. According to the article, patients paid Reese what they could afford, while widows and orphans of mill workers were not charged for his services. At Reese's funeral service at Youngstown's Welsh Congregational Church, the presiding minister described Reese's contributions in the following terms: "He began to serve early in his life and kept on. He was faithful to the end. The only life worth living is the life of service".

Meanwhile, the New York Times noted that Reese developed his much-vaunted skills during the years of poverty and obscurity that he spent in his native Wales. Youngstown's famous "baseball doctor" was interred at Youngstown's Oak Hill Cemetery, where his wife, Sarah, had been buried 17 years earlier.
