= Mary Simmerson Cunningham Logan =

American writer and editor

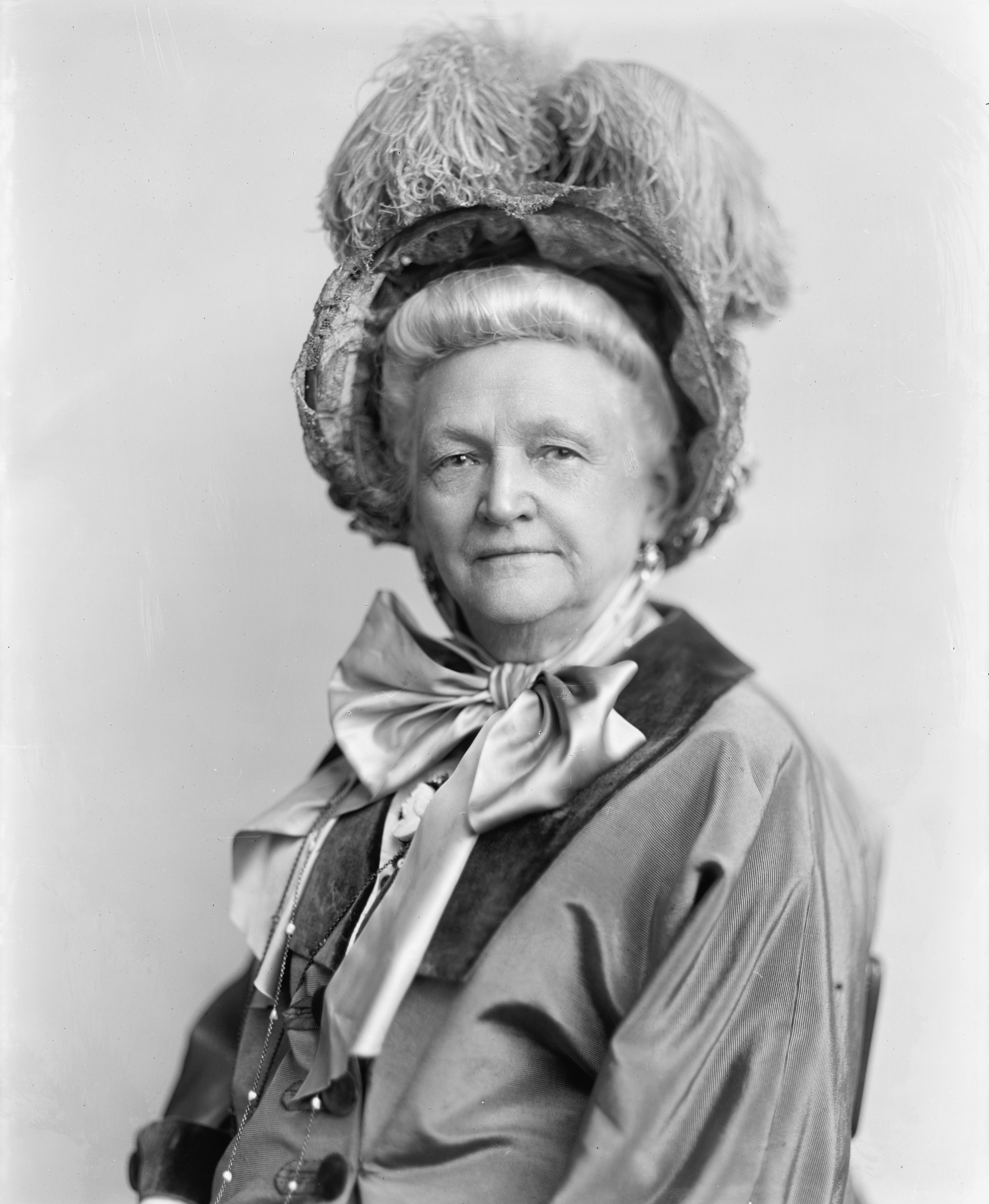
- Mary Logan
- Born: Mary Simmerson Cunningham; August 15, 1838; Sturgeon, Missouri
- Died: February 22, 1923 (aged 84); Washington, D.C.
- Occupations: Writer and editor
- Spouse: John A. Logan

Mary Simmerson Cunningham Logan (née Mary Simmerson Cunningham; pen name, Mrs. John A. Logan; August 15, 1838 – February 22, 1923) was an American writer and editor from Missouri.

== Early years and education ==
It was near the present village of Sturgeon, Missouri then known as Petersburg, in Boone County, Missouri, that Mary Simmerson Cunningham was born, on August 15, 1838. Her American ancestry went back to an Irish settler of Virginia and a French pioneer of Louisiana. Her great-grandfather, Robert Cunningham, of Virginia, was a soldier of the war for Independence, after which he removed to Tennessee, thence to Alabama, and thence to Illinois, when still a Territory, and there manumitted his slaves.

Her father, Captain John M. Cunningham of Marion, Illinois, had been engaged in both the Black Hawk and Mexican-American wars. He was twice elected sheriff and county clerk of Williamson County, Illinois, U. S. marshal of the southern district of Illinois, and President Franklin Pierce appointed him register of the land office at Shawneetown, Illinois. He was also a member of the Legislature of Illinois in 1845 and 1846. Her mother was Miss Elizabeth Fontaine, of a distinguished family of that name which had arrived in Louisiana during the French occupancy of that country and had thence journeyed up the Mississippi River and settled in Missouri, where John Cunningham met Elizabeth Fontaine and they married.

When Mary was one year old, her parents removed to Illinois and settled at Marion, her father's home town. By the time she was nine years old, she encountered the dangers of a frontier home, when her father went forth to fight in the Mexican–American War, and braved the miner's life in the Sierra Nevada of California. Mary relieved her mother, who was not strong, of most of the household work, while attending the primitive school of the neighborhood, and trained herself in needlework. In 1853, she was sent to the Convent of St. Vincent, near Morganfield, Kentucky, a branch of the Nazareth Institute, the oldest institution of the kind in the US.

While her father was a captain of volunteers in the Mexican War, John A. Logan was in the same regiment and they befriended each other. Mary was the oldest of thirteen children, and the large family, with the modest circumstances of her father, compelled her to start working after her graduation from St. Vincent's in 1855; she assisted her father in clerical work during his tenure as land register during President Pierce's administration.

== Marriage and career ==
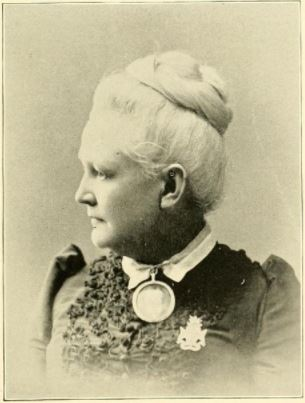
Mary Simmerson Cunningham Logan

She met and formed an attachment with John A. Logan, 13 years her senior, while working with her father in Shawneetown. Mr. Logan was then an ambitious young lawyer, the prosecuting attorney for the third judicial circuit of Illinois, residing in the town of Benton, Illinois. They married November 27, 1855, when she was 16 years old, and at once went to the young attorney's home at Benton where he opened a law office. Though she was reared a Baptist, after her marriage she joined the Methodist Church, the church of the Logan family.

He was re-elected to the Legislature in 1856 as a Democrat. During this term in the Legislature he became quite prominent through his advocacy of very important measures, and as early as 1857, was called by a colleague in the Legislature the "Black Eagle of the South." The title being suggested by his vigor and independence and very dark complexion.

Mrs. Logan immediately identified her interests with those of her husband and in many ways she contributed to his many successes in the political world. She accompanied him on all his professional journeys, an undertaking in those days of wildernesses and no roads, often requiring great endurance and privation. A son, John Cunningham Logan, was born in 1856 but died the following year. Also in 1856, Mrs. Logan saw her husband elected a member of the Legislature, and in the Douglas and Lincoln Senatorial contest, he was elected as a Douglas Democrat to Congress. In all the political campaigns, the wife went with her husband, assisting in much of his Work of correspondence and copying, and frequently receiving his friends and conferring with them on the details of the campaign. When Mr. Logan came to Congress as a Representative, Mrs. Logan came with him. She remained with him in Washington until the outbreak of the American Civil War, when he resigned his seat in Congress to return to Illinois to go into the service of his country.

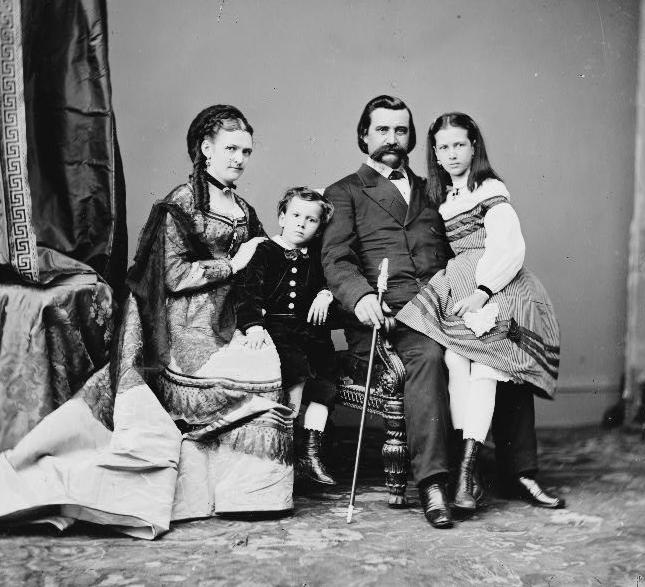
Mary and John Logan, with son, Manning, and daughter, Mary.

With the war commencing in 1861, and Mr. Logan assigned to the command of the 31st Illinois Volunteers, Mrs. Logan and daughter Mary (nicknamed "Dollie", 1858–1940) returned to Capt Cunningham's home at Marion. The Illinois troops having been ordered into camp at Cairo, Mrs. Logan joined her husband there. During the battle of Belmont, Mrs. Logan cared for the wounded soldiers as they were brought back from the bloody field. When the army entered upon the Tennessee River campaign, Mrs. Logan again returned to her home, but was soon shocked by the news from Donelson that her husband had fallen at the head of his charging columns, dangerously wounded. She hastened to the scene to care for her husband, a struggle between life and death. At Memphis, in the winter of 1862–3, Mrs. Logan again joined her husband, now a general, and remained there until he led his troops in the campaign which ended in the surrender of Vicksburg. During this time, and to the end of the war, Mrs. Logan remained at Carbondale, where, out of the General's salary, they had bought an unpretentious home. Upon his return from the war, General Logan was nominated by acclamation for Congressman-at-large. After his election, Mrs. Logan returned to Washington and became a prominent figure in Washington society. After his service in the United States House of Representatives, General Logan was elected to the United States Senate. At the time of his nomination for the vice-presidency with James G. Blaine, it was she who restrained the impetuosity of her husband, who would have scorned the nomination, and prevented any differences between the leaders of the party.

It came as a terrible blow to Mrs. Logan when the General became sick and died in 1886. She decided a change of scene would help her and so she traveled through Europe, chaperoning George Pullman's daughters. On her return, Mrs. Logan became the editor of The Home Magazine, of Washington, which ran from 1888 to 1908, writing reminiscences of historic events. She served on the syndicate staff of Hearst news service, was a contributor to other magazine and newspapers, and wrote several books. President Benjamin Harrison appointed Mrs. Logan one of the women commissioners of the District of Columbia to the Columbian Exposition (Chicago, 1893). She also worked on plans for the Garfield Memorial Hospital, having been president of the board nine years. Logan died at her home in Washington, D.C. in 1923 and was buried beside her husband and two of her grandsons in a mausoleum at the United States Soldiers' and Airmen's Home National Cemetery. Effects from her estate were put up for auction by C.G. Sloan & Co., Washington, D.C., in1924.

== Calumet Place ==
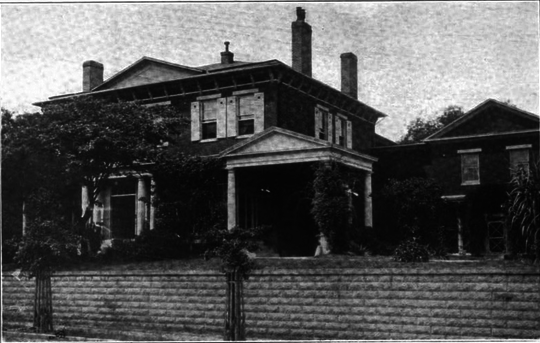
Calumet Place, Logan's home in Washington D.C.

The family residence, "Calumet Place," Washington, in which both Gen. and Mrs. Logan died, was a new and long-desired home at the time of his death, but unpaid for. Friends of the General in Chicago voluntarily raised a fund and put it at Mrs. Logan's disposal. The first thing she did was to secure the homestead, and in it devoted what was once the studio of an artist and former owner to a "Memorial Hall," where all the General's books, army uniforms, portraits, busts, presents and souvenirs of life were gathered to form an interesting collection. She gave the collection of memorials, trophies and souvenirs of her husband and of her only son, Maj. John Alexander Logan Jr., who was killed Nov. 11, 1899, at the Battle of San Jacinto, to the State of Illinois.

== Selected works ==
- 1889, The home manual : everybody's guide in social, domestic, and business life : a treasury of useful information for the million : profusely illustrated, the contents of one hundred books in a single volume : touches ten thousand topics : embracing etiquette, hygiene, household economy, beauty, method of money-making, care of children, nursing of invalids, outdoor sports, indoor games, fancy work, home decoration, business, civil service, history, geography, physiology, writing for the press, teaching, Italian art, etc., etc.
- 1895, Official, diplomatic, and social etiquette of Washington (with Katherine Elwes Thomas)
- 1901, Thirty years in Washington; or, Life and scenes in our national capital. Portraying the wonderful operations in all the great departments, and describing every important function of our national government ... With sketches of the presidents and their wives ... from Washington's to Roosevelt's administration
- 1908, Our national government; or, Life and scenes in our national capital. Portraying the wonderful operations in all the great departments, and describing every important function of our law-making bodies, including its historical, executive, administrative, departmental, artistic, and social features. With sketches of the presidents and their wives ... from Washington's to Taft's administration
- 1912, The part taken by women in American history
- 1913, Reminiscences of a soldier's wife : an autobiography
- 1922, How Memorial Day came to be. The story of the American Decoration Day is told by the widow of the man who originated the holiday
