= Calvin Pease =

American judge

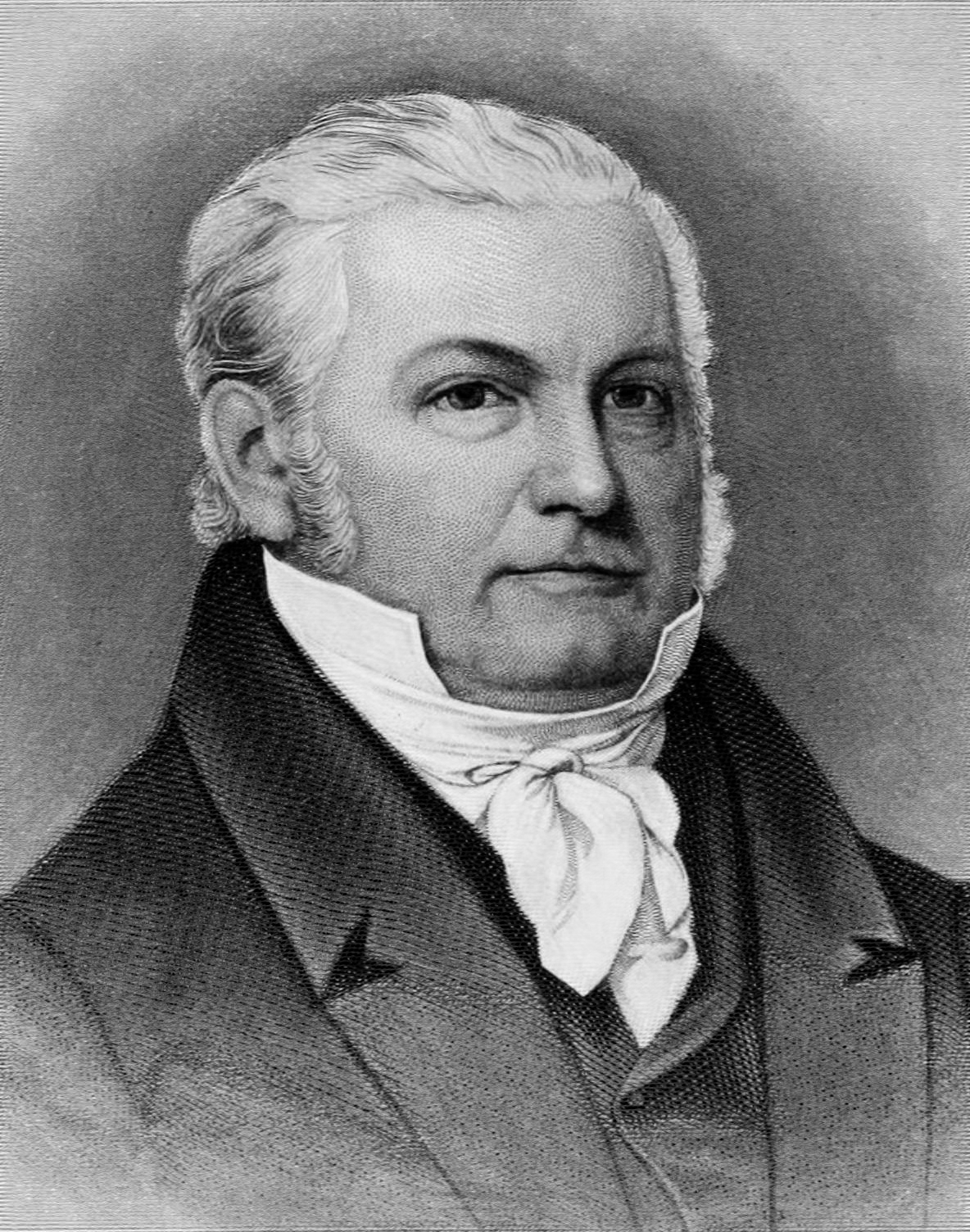

Justice of the Ohio Supreme Court
- In office February 16, 1816 – February 16, 1830
- Preceded by: new seat
- Succeeded by: Elijah Hayward

Personal details
- Born: September 9, 1776 Suffield, Connecticut
- Died: September 17, 1839 (aged 63) Warren, Ohio
- Resting place: Oakwood Cemetery
- Spouse: Laura Grant Risley
- Children: seven
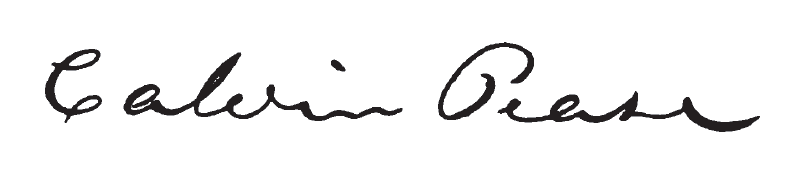
- Signature

Calvin Pease (September 9, 1776–September 17, 1839) was a lawyer and legislator in the U.S. State of Ohio who was in the Ohio Senate, in the Ohio House of Representatives, and an Ohio Supreme Court Judge 1816-1830.

== Early life ==
Calvin Pease was born in Suffield, Connecticut. He studied law in the office of his brother-in-law Gideon Granger, and was admitted to the bar in 1798, practicing in New Hartford, Connecticut. He came to the Northwest Territory in 1800. He was appointed first clerk of the court of quarter sessions in August in Warren, and admitted to the bar in October. After Ohio's statehood, he was elected president-judge of the Court of Common Pleas of the Third Circuit.

== Impeachment ==
While Pease was Judge of the Third Circuit, the Legislature passed a law that "justices of the peace should have jurisdiction in civil cases to the amount of $50, without the right of trial by jury." Pease held that this was in conflict with the United States Constitution, which stated "in suits of common law when the value shall exceed $20, the right of trial by jury shall be preserved," and the State Constitution, which stated "the right of trial by jury shall be inviolate." This decision established judicial review of legislative decisions. Supreme Court Judges George Tod and Samuel Huntington upheld Pease's decision. Pease and Tod were impeached by the legislature. Huntington was not impeached because he had already been elected governor and would resign his seat by the wend of the year. Pease and Tod were each acquitted in their impeachment trials by a single vote. One author says "From that day, the right of the Supreme Court to pass on the constitutionality of laws has seldom even been questioned." Another says "The Ohio legislature, however, would continue to try to establish itself as the dominant force in state government at the expense of the judicial branch."

== State office ==
In 1812-1813, Pease was elected to the Ohio Senate representing Trumbull County in the 11th General Assembly. In 1816, the Legislature elected him to the Ohio Supreme Court, a position he held until 1830. In 1831 and 1832, he represented Trumbull County in the Ohio House of Representatives for the 30th General Assembly.

On June 2, 1804, Pease married Laura Grant Risley in Washington, D.C. They had seven children, five of whom survived to adulthood.

Calvin Pease died September 17, 1839, in Warren. He was buried at Oakwood Cemetery in Warren, and his wife was buried next to him after she died April 6, 1872.

== Notes ==
Legal offices
Preceded by new seat	Ohio Supreme Court Justice; February 16, 1816 – February 16, 1830	Succeeded by Elijah Hayward
Ohio Senate
Preceded by George Tod	Senator from Trumbull County; December 7, 1812 – December 5, 1813	Succeeded by Daniel Eaton
Ohio House of Representatives
Preceded by Benjamin Allen; Richard Iddings	Representative from Trumbull County; December 5, 1831 – December 2, 1832; Served alongside: Jared Kirtland	Succeeded by Benjamin Allen; Jediah Fitch
