= Logan House (Wilmington, Delaware) =

- U.S. National Register of Historic Places
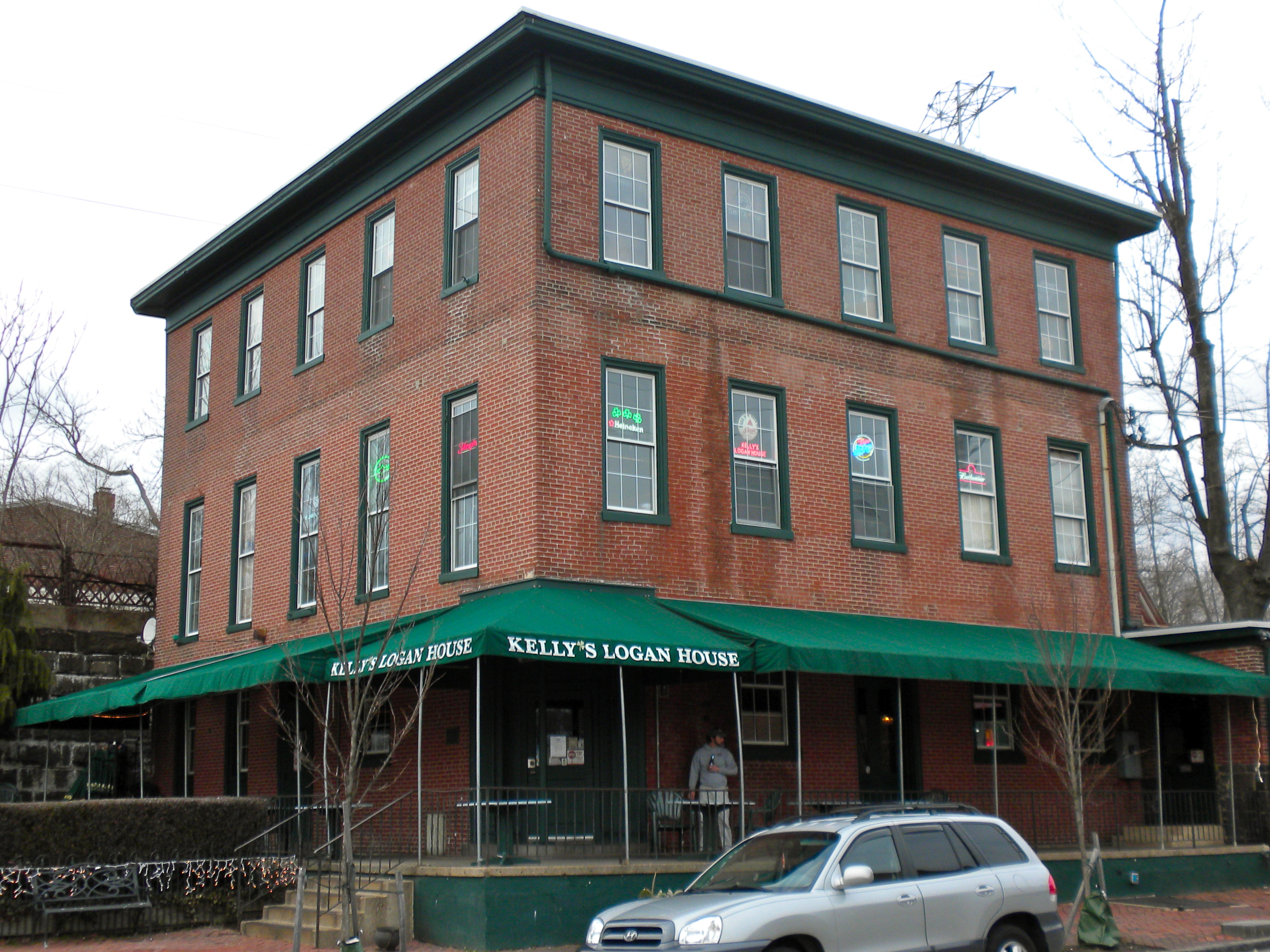
- Logan House, January 2010

- Location within Delaware Location within the United States
- Location: 1701 Delaware Ave., Wilmington, Delaware
- Coordinates: 39.758304°N 75.562372°W
- Area: 0.5 acres (0.20 ha)
- Built: 1865
- Architectural style: Italianate
- NRHP reference No.: 80000935
- Added to NRHP: April 2, 1980

Logan House is a historic hotel located at Wilmington, New Castle County, Delaware. It was built in 1865, and is a three-story, five bay by five bay, flat roofed brick building with Italianate elements. It has three one-story wings; one original brick wing, a wing added about 1910, and a concrete block wing added about 1960. Also on the property is a contributing brick carriage house. The hotel was named for American Civil War General John A. Logan. It has been owned by the Kelly family since 1889 and has been a traditional gathering place on St. Patrick's Day. In the 1930s, the hotel closed and only a restaurant and tavern remained in operation.

It was added to the National Register of Historic Places in 1980.
