= John Alexander Logan Jr. =

American army officer (1865–1899)

- John A. Logan Jr.
- Born: July 24, 1865; Carbondale, Illinois
- Died: November 11, 1899 (aged 34); San Jacinto, Pangasinan, Luzon, Philippines
- Burial place: Oak Hill Cemetery (Youngstown, Ohio)
- Military career
- Allegiance: United States
- Branch: United States Army
- Service years: 1898–1899
- Rank: Major
- Unit: 33rd U.S. Volunteer Infantry
- Conflicts: Spanish-American War; Siege of Santiago; Philippine–American War; Battle of San Jacinto †
- Awards: Medal of Honor

John Alexander Logan Jr., born Manning Alexander Logan (July 24, 1865 – November 11, 1899), was a United States Army officer who posthumously received the Medal of Honor for actions during the Philippine–American War.

== Biography ==
Logan was the son of Major General, statesman and politician John A. Logan and writer and editor Mary Simmerson Cunningham Logan. He was a former cadet at West Point as a member of the class of 1887.

Upon his father's death in 1886, Logan became a First Class Companion of the Military Order of the Loyal Legion of the United States (MOLLUS), a military society of officers of the Union armed forces and their descendants. In 1894 he became a member of the Ohio Society of the Sons of the American Revolution. In 1897, he became a Hereditary Companion of the District of Columbia Commandery of the Military Order of Foreign Wars (MOFW) by right of his father's service in the Mexican War. He was assigned (MOFW) insignia number 284.

During the Spanish–American War he was commissioned as a major in the United States Volunteers and served as an assistant adjutant general in the Siege of Santiago.

Major Logan participated in the Philippine–American War as a battalion commander in the 33d United States Volunteer Infantry. He was mortally wounded while leading his troops in an attack on a much larger force in the Battle of San Jacinto (1899). On May 3, 1902 he was posthumously awarded the Medal of Honor for this action. He is buried in Oak Hill Cemetery in Youngstown, Ohio.

== Medal of Honor citation ==
Rank and Organization: Major, 33d Infantry, U.S. Volunteers. Place and Date: At San Jacinto, Philippine Islands, November 11, 1899. Entered Service At: Youngstown, Ohio. Born: July 24, 1865, Carbondale, Ill. Date of Issue: May 3, 1902.

Citation:

For most distinguished gallantry in leading his battalion upon the entrenchments of the enemy, on which occasion he fell mortally wounded.

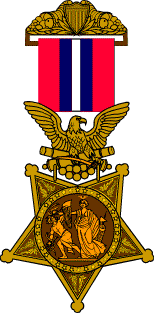
Medal of Honor 1896–1903 Army medal

== See also ==
- List of Medal of Honor recipients
