= Shiloh Hill, Illinois =

- Unincorporated community
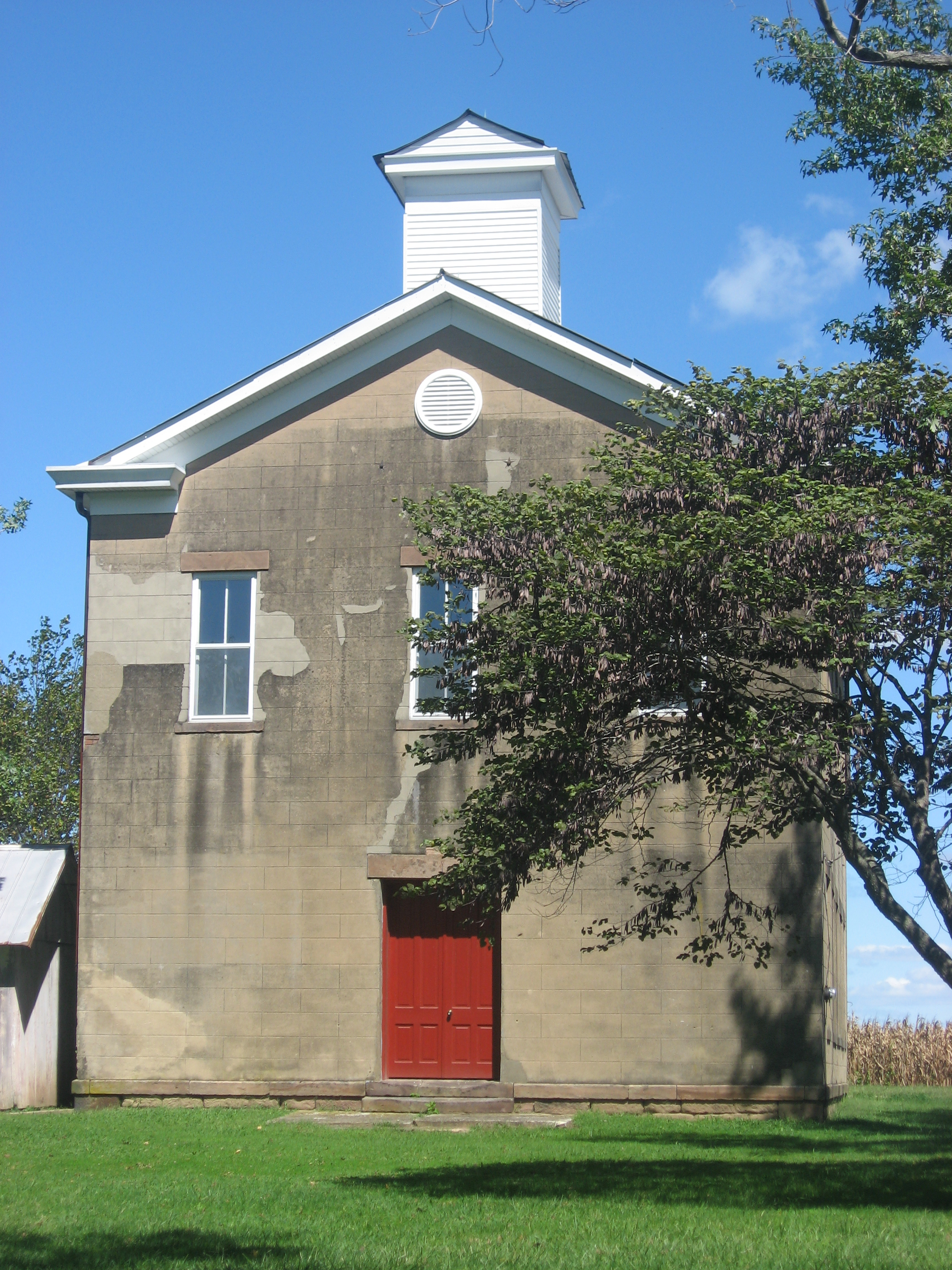
- Main building from the former Shiloh College

- Location within Illinois Location within the United States
- Coordinates: 37°55′31″N 89°37′16″W
- Country: United States
- State: Illinois
- County: Randolph
- Elevation: 512 ft (156 m)
- Time zone: UTC-6 (Central (CST))
  - Summer (DST): UTC-5 (CDT)
- Area code: 618
- GNIS feature ID: 418421

Shiloh Hill is an unincorporated community in Randolph County, Illinois, United States. Shiloh Hill is 4 miles (6.4 km) west of Campbell Hill.

== History ==
Shiloh Hill was originally called Steuben, and under the latter name was platted in 1856.
