= Mary Logan Tucker =

American political activist

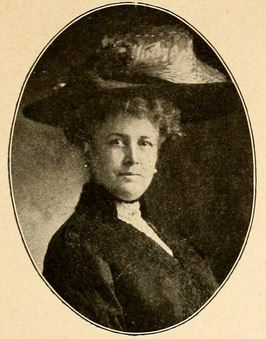
- Born: Mary Elizabeth Logan; June 20, 1858; Benton, Franklin County, Illinois
- Died: March 16, 1940 (aged 81); Washington, D. C.
- Other names: Dolly Logan
- Occupations: farmer, political activist

Mary Logan Tucker (June 20, 1858 – March 16, 1940) was an American political activist. She attended the Convent of the Visitation, Georgetown, in Washington, D.C. Tucker organized and founded the Georgetown Alumnae Association and was elected and served as its first president in 1893. She was an active member of the Illinois State Association and the Illinois State Society of Washington, D.C., from the late nineteenth century until her death. She also served as the president of the Dames of the Loyal Legion of the United States from 1924 to 1928, and was a member of the Society of the Daughters of the American Revolution, the Society of the Army of the Tennessee, and the Legion of Loyal Women.

== Early life ==
Mary Elizabeth Logan was born on June 20, 1858, in Benton, Franklin County, Illinois, to Mary Simmerson (née Cunningham) and General John A. Logan. Her father had served in both the Illinois legislature and the United States House of Representatives and then went on to serve in the Union Army. As an infant, when Congress was in session, the family resided in Washington, D. C., and maintained a home in Carbondale, Illinois, for when the legislature was in recess. During the Civil War the family remained in Carbondale, but in 1871 moved to Chicago, where Logan began her education at a private school. Later that year when her father was elected to the U. S. Senate, the family returned to Washington. There, she was placed in Georgetown's Convent of the Visitation School, where she completed her schooling graduating from high school in 1876.

In Chicago, on November 27, 1877, Logan married William F. Tucker, who was working for the Pay Corps of the Army. The couple were posted to Santa Fe, New Mexico, where they remained for four years. On September 21, 1878, the couple had their first child, Logan. Thereafter, Major Tucker was posted to Washington, D. C., where they lived for eight years, until a transfer sent the couple to St. Paul, Minnesota. The couple's second son, George Edwin Tucker was born on August 18, 1891. In 1893, Tucker founded the alumnae association of the Georgetown Convent of Visitation, for which she was elected as its first president. When the Major was sent to Atlanta, Georgia, during the Spanish–American War, Tucker returned to Washington. In 1896, she and her son George were the beneficiaries of the estate of George E. Lemon, a family friend and godfather of Tucker's youngest son. Each inherited one-fifth of his estate plus an award of $25,000. At the conclusion of the conflict, the couple reunited in Chicago and made a home there until 1899, when the major was recalled to Washington. Because the major was subsequently sent to Fort Vancouver in Portland, Oregon, (1901) and Manila to serve as chief paymaster to the U.S. Army in the Philippines (1904), Tucker resided with her mother in Washington. In 1905, her son George died from appendicitis in Manila. Tucker, took up farming in Maryland, and advocated it as a viable occupation for women.

== Scandal ==
Beginning in 1907, Tucker was involved in a scandalous divorce, which threatened to tarnish the carefully crafted family history that her mother had spent years building. For two years, newspapers from coast to coast covered the story. Tucker initiated the proceedings alleging misconduct by her husband. Approaching the War Department, she attempted to have him discharged from the military, alleging he had engaged in conduct unbecoming to an officer. The military investigation proved the charges insufficient, and when her divorce was declined Colonel Tucker instigated proceedings. The press carried reports that the marital trouble was due to the bequest from Lemon, several years before. Tucker then changed the grounds to desertion, and Colonel Tucker was arrested, but released as he was undergoing medical treatment. In 1909, the couple were granted an absolute divorce, with the Colonel ordered to pay alimony to Tucker. In 1911 the couple's only remaining child, Logan, died of heart failure amid rumors of suicide.

== Activism ==
In 1916, Tucker organized a branch of the Loyal Legion of Dames in Washington, D. C. That same year, she was serving as a vice president of the Women's National Republican Club, which was not in support of women's suffrage. Instead, their aim was to mobilize women to support the candidacy of Charles Evans Hughes. Opposed to the pacifist stance of the group of feminists who would form the Women's International League for Peace and Freedom, Tucker urged the army to train women to participate in the conflict, teaching them small arms use, telegraphy and signalling. By the early 1920s, Tucker and Cornelia Ross Potts were so opposed to the WILPF message that they convened a meeting to protest the annual WILPF convention in 1924 and attended the convention heckling the speakers. In response, they formed a group known as the National Patriotic Council, bringing together women from the American Legion Auxiliary, Daughters of 1812, Daughters of the American Revolution, and other organizations with the purpose of eliminating communism and pacifist movements, which were radical or unpatriotic. Tucker and Potts, who shared the leadership of the Daughters of 1812, created a propaganda investigation committee and by 1927 created a loyalty committee. In 1928, Tucker organized a national convention of patriotic societies to combat the pacifist movement. That same year, she took her message to the radio, broadcasting a Dames of the Loyal Legion program aimed to generate respect for heroes. She called for all teachers in either public or private schools to take an oath of allegiance to the United States and pledge to give honor to all historic soldiers and sailors of the nation.

== Death and legacy ==
Tucker died on March 16, 1940, at her home in Washington, D. C. She was buried on the grounds of the Old Soldiers and Sailors Home in the Logan family crypt.
