= Battle of San Jacinto (1899) =

1899 battle

- Part of the Philippine–American War
Date	November 11, 1899
Location	San Jacinto, Pangasinan, Philippines
Result	American victory

Belligerents
United States	Philippine Republic

Commanders and leaders
Loyd Wheaton; Luther Hare; John Alexander Logan Jr. (DOW)	Manuel Tinio

Strength
33rd USV Infantry Regiment	Tinio Brigade, 1,200~ Men

Casualties and losses
8 killed 13 wounded	134 killed

The Battle of San Jacinto (Filipino: Labanan sa San Jacinto, Spanish: Batalla de San Jacinto) took place during the Philippine–American War fought on November 11, 1899, in San Jacinto, Pangasinan, Philippines, between the Philippines and the United States.

== Background ==
During the fall of 1899, General Elwell S. Otis began a three-pronged offensive against the Filipinos north of Manila. General Arthur MacArthur's 2nd Division was moving north along the railroad running out of Manila, General Henry W. Lawton's 1st Division moved up the Pampanga River against San Isidro. The third expedition would be led by General Loyd Wheaton, commander of the 1st Brigade, 2nd Division. Wheaton's brigade was detached and landed at San Fabian on Lingayen Gulf. After landing on 7 Nov., Wheaton sent out patrols to the south and west towards Dagupan.

Brig. Gen. Manuel Tinio's 1,200 brigade had established his headquarters in San Jacinto in early November, building barricaded, trenches and obstacles.

== Battle ==
The 33rd U.S. Volunteer Infantry's advance company were ambushed on the road to San Jacinto, forcing them to the muddy rice fields to the right and Major Peyton C. March's battalion to the left. March's men were able to flank the Filipinos and entered the town, forcing the Tinio Brigade to retreat. Eight US soldiers were killed, including Major John Alexander Logan, Jr.

== Aftermath ==
Wheaton and MacArthur's forces joined on the 26th at Mangatarem, Pangasinan, when the 36th Infantry joined Capt. Godfrey Fowler's Company F, 33rd Infantry. Fowler had earlier forced Brig. Gen. Jose Alejandrino's 500-1000 troops to abandon their artillery, supplies and 100 Spanish prisoners.

== See also ==
- Campaigns of the Philippine–American War
