= William McKinley =

President of the United States from 1897 to 1901

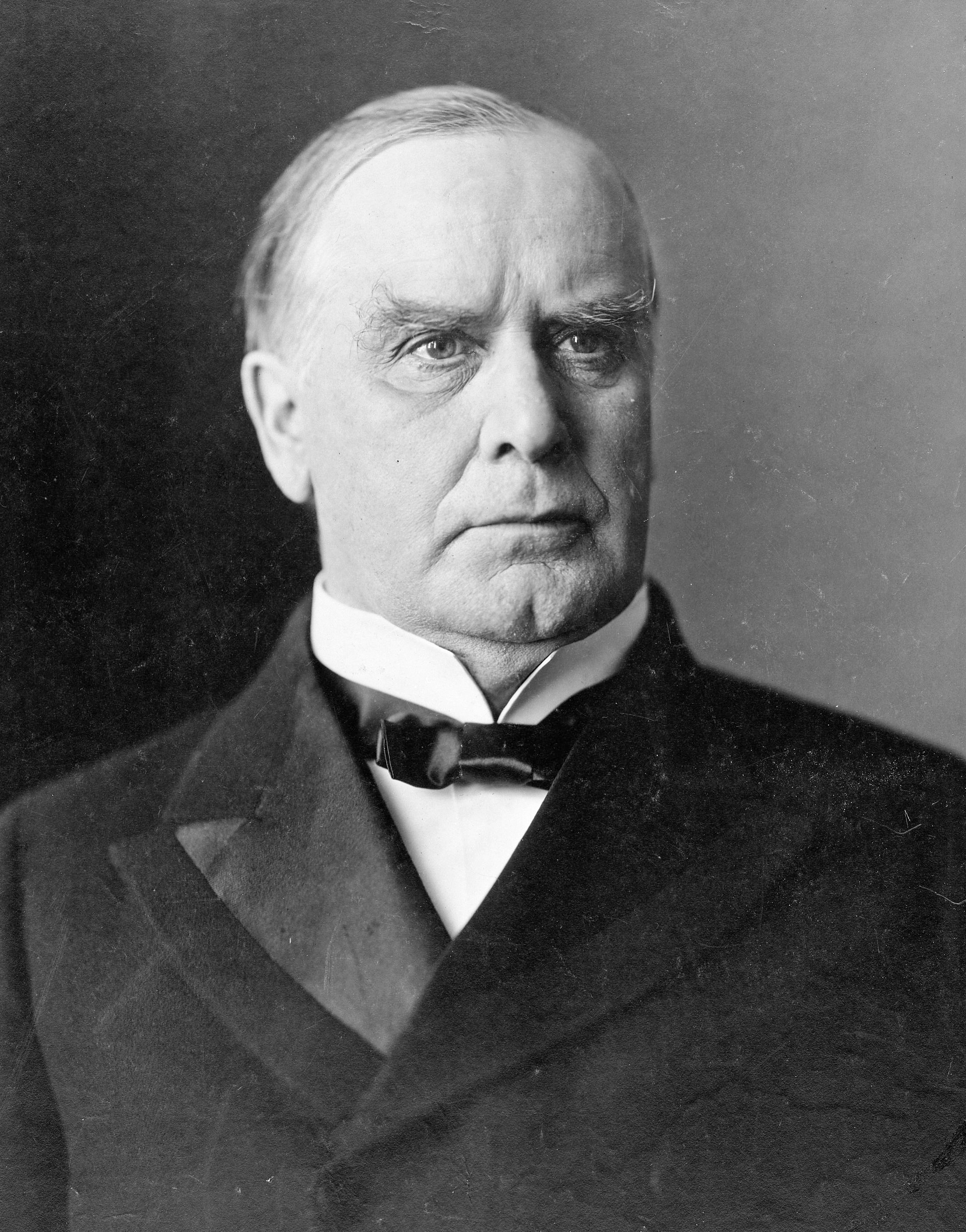
- McKinley c. 1900

25th President of the United States
- In office March 4, 1897 – September 14, 1901
- Vice President: Garret Hobart (1897–1899); Vacant (1899–1901) (Note: Vice President Hobart died in office. As this was before the adoption of the Twenty-fifth Amendment in 1967, a vacancy in the office of vice president was not filled until the next ensuing election and inauguration.); Theodore Roosevelt (Mar–Sept 1901)
- Preceded by: Grover Cleveland
- Succeeded by: Theodore Roosevelt

39th Governor of Ohio
- In office January 11, 1892 – January 13, 1896
- Lieutenant: Andrew L. Harris
- Preceded by: James E. Campbell
- Succeeded by: Asa S. Bushnell

Member of the U.S. House of Representatives from Ohio
- In office March 4, 1885 – March 3, 1891
- Preceded by: David R. Paige
- Succeeded by: Joseph D. Taylor
- Constituency: 20th district (1885–1887); 18th district (1887–1891)
- In office March 4, 1877 – May 27, 1884
- Preceded by: Laurin D. Woodworth
- Succeeded by: Jonathan H. Wallace
- Constituency: 17th district (1877–1879); 16th district (1879–1881); 17th district (1881–1883); 18th district (1883–1884)
House positions
Chair of the House Ways and Means Committee
In office March 4, 1889 – March 3, 1891
Preceded by	Roger Q. Mills
Succeeded by	William M. Springer

Personal details
- Born: William McKinley Jr. January 29, 1843 Niles, Ohio, U.S.
- Died: September 14, 1901 (aged 58) Buffalo, New York, U.S.
- Cause of death: Assassination (gangrene due to infection in gunshot wound)
- Resting place: McKinley National Memorial
- Party: Republican
- Spouse: Ida Saxton (m. 1871)
- Children: 2
- Parents: William McKinley Sr. (father); Nancy Allison (mother)
- Education: Allegheny College; Mount Union College; Albany Law School
- Profession: Politician; lawyer

Military service
- Branch/service: United States Army (Union Army)
- Years of service: 1861–1865
- Rank: Brevet major
- Unit: 23rd Ohio Infantry
- Battles/wars: See list: American Civil War; Battle of Carnifex Ferry; Second Battle of Bull Run; Maryland campaign; Battle of South Mountain; Battle of Antietam; Battle of Buffington Island; Battle of Cloyd's Mountain; Second Battle of Kernstown; Shenandoah Valley campaigns; Battle of Berryville; Battle of Opequon; Battle of Fisher's Hill; Battle of Cedar Creek
- McKinley's voice McKinley giving a campaign speech for his first presidential campaign Recorded 1896

William McKinley (January 29, 1843 – September 14, 1901) was the 25th president of the United States, serving from 1897 until his assassination in 1901. A member of the Republican Party, he led a realignment that made Republicans largely dominant in the industrial states and nationwide for decades. McKinley successfully led the U.S. in the Spanish–American War and oversaw a period of American expansionism, with the annexations of Hawaii, Puerto Rico, Guam, the Philippines, and American Samoa.

McKinley was the last president to have served in the American Civil War; he was the only one to begin his service as an enlisted man and end it as a brevet major. After the war, he settled in Canton, Ohio, where he practiced law and married Ida Saxton. In 1876, McKinley was elected to Congress, where he became the Republican expert on the protective tariff, believing protectionism would bring prosperity. His 1890 McKinley Tariff was highly controversial and, together with a Democratic Party redistricting aimed at gerrymandering him out of office, led to his defeat in the Democratic landslide of 1890. He was elected governor of Ohio in 1891 and 1893, steering a moderate course between capital and labor interests.

McKinley secured the Republican nomination for president in 1896 amid a deep economic depression and defeated his Democratic rival William Jennings Bryan after a front porch campaign in which he advocated "sound money" (the gold standard unless altered by international agreement) and promised that high tariffs would restore prosperity. McKinley's presidency saw rapid economic growth. He rejected free silver in favor of keeping the nation on the gold standard, and raised protective tariffs, signing the Dingley Tariff of 1897 to protect manufacturers and factory workers from foreign competition and securing the passage of the Gold Standard Act of 1900.

McKinley's foreign policy emulated the era's overseas imperialism of the great powers in Oceania, Asia, and the Caribbean Sea. The United States annexed the independent Republic of Hawaii in 1898, and it became the Territory of Hawaii in 1900. McKinley hoped to persuade Spain to grant independence to rebellious Cuba without conflict. Still, when negotiations failed, he requested and signed Congress's declaration of war to begin the Spanish–American War of 1898, in which the United States saw a quick and decisive victory. As part of the peace settlement, Spain turned over to the United States its main overseas colonies of Puerto Rico, Guam, and the Philippines, while Cuba was promised independence but remained under American control until 1902, after McKinley's death. In the Philippines, a pro-independence rebellion began; it was eventually suppressed. McKinley acquired what is now American Samoa when his administration partitioned the Samoan Islands with the empires of Britain and Germany in the Tripartite Convention, during a period of warming ties between the UK and US known as the Great Rapprochement.

McKinley defeated Bryan again in the 1900 presidential election in a campaign focused on imperialism, protectionism, and free silver. His second term ended early when he was shot on September 6, 1901, by anarchist Leon Czolgosz. McKinley died eight days later and was succeeded by Vice President Theodore Roosevelt, whose popularity overshadowed McKinley's legacy. Historians regard McKinley's 1896 victory as a realigning election in which the political stalemate of the post-Civil War era gave way to the Republican-dominated Fourth Party System, beginning with the Progressive Era. The United States retains control over the major territories McKinley annexed, aside from the Philippines which became independent in 1946. McKinley is generally ranked among the middle tier of presidents.

== Early life and family ==
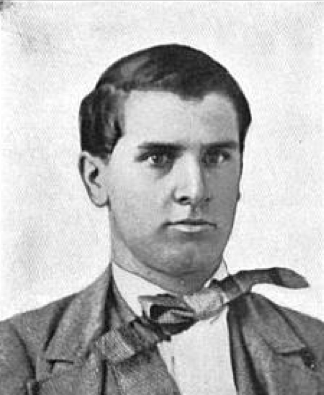
McKinley, aged 15

William McKinley Jr. was born in 1843 in Niles, Ohio, the seventh of nine children of William McKinley Sr. and Nancy (née Allison) McKinley. The McKinleys were of English and Scots-Irish descent and had settled in western Pennsylvania in the 18th century. Their immigrant ancestor was David McKinley, born in Dervock, County Antrim, in present-day Northern Ireland. William McKinley Sr. was born in Pennsylvania, in Pine Township, Mercer County.

The family moved to Ohio when the senior McKinley was a boy, settling in New Lisbon (now Lisbon). He met Nancy Allison there, and they married later. The Allison family was of mostly English descent and among Pennsylvania's earliest settlers. The family trade on both sides was iron making. McKinley senior operated foundries throughout Ohio, in New Lisbon, Niles, Poland, and finally Canton. The McKinley household was, like many from Ohio's Western Reserve, steeped in Whiggish and abolitionist sentiment, the latter based on the family's staunch Methodist beliefs.

The younger William also followed in the Methodist tradition, becoming active in the local Methodist church at the age of 16. He was a lifelong pious Methodist.

In 1852, the family moved from Niles to Poland, Ohio, so that their children could attend its better schools. Graduating from Poland Seminary in 1859, McKinley enrolled the following year at Allegheny College in Meadville, Pennsylvania. He remained at Allegheny for one year, returning home in 1860 after becoming ill and depressed. He also studied at Mount Union College, now the University of Mount Union, in Alliance, Ohio, where he later served as a member of the board of trustees. Although his health recovered, family finances declined, and McKinley was unable to return to Allegheny. He began working as a postal clerk and later took a job teaching at a school near Poland, Ohio.

== Civil War ==
=== Western Virginia and Antietam ===
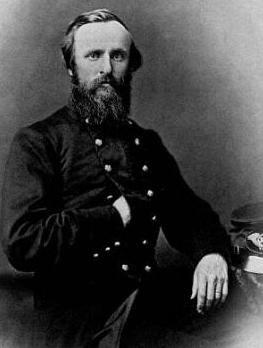
Rutherford B. Hayes was McKinley's mentor during and after the Civil War.

When the Confederate states seceded and the American Civil War began in 1861, thousands of men in Ohio volunteered for service. Among them were McKinley and his cousin William McKinley Osbourne, who enlisted as privates in the newly formed Poland Guards in June 1861. The men left for Columbus, where they were consolidated with other small units to form the 23rd Ohio Infantry.

The men were unhappy to learn that, unlike Ohio's earlier volunteer regiments, they would not be permitted to elect their officers; these would be designated by Ohio's governor, William Dennison. Dennison appointed Colonel William Rosecrans the commander of the regiment, and the men began training on the outskirts of Columbus. McKinley quickly took to the soldier's life: he wrote a series of letters to his hometown newspaper extolling the army and the Union cause. Delays in issuance of uniforms and weapons again brought the men into conflict with their officers, but Major Rutherford B. Hayes convinced them to accept what the government had issued them; his style in dealing with the men impressed McKinley, beginning an association and friendship that would last until Hayes's death in 1893.

After a month of training, McKinley and the 23rd Ohio, now led by Colonel Eliakim P. Scammon, set out for western Virginia (today part of West Virginia) in July 1861 as a part of the Kanawha Division. McKinley initially thought Scammon was a martinet, but when the regiment entered battle, he came to appreciate the value of their relentless drilling. Their first contact with the enemy came in September when they drove back Confederate troops at Carnifex Ferry in present-day West Virginia. Three days after the battle, McKinley was assigned to duty in the brigade quartermaster office, where he worked both to supply his regiment, and as a clerk. In November, the regiment established winter quarters near Fayetteville (today in West Virginia). McKinley spent the winter substituting for a commissary sergeant who was ill, and in April 1862 he was promoted to that rank. The regiment resumed its advance that spring with Hayes in command (Scammon led the brigade) and fought several minor engagements against the rebel forces.

That September, McKinley's regiment was called east to reinforce General John Pope's Army of Virginia at the Second Battle of Bull Run. Delayed in passing through Washington, D.C., the 23rd Ohio did not arrive in time for the battle but joined the Army of the Potomac as it hurried north to cut off Robert E. Lee's Army of Northern Virginia as it advanced into Maryland. The 23rd was the first regiment to encounter the Confederates at the Battle of South Mountain on September 14. After severe losses, Union forces drove back the Confederates and continued to Sharpsburg, Maryland, where they engaged Lee's army at the Battle of Antietam, one of the bloodiest battles of the war. The 23rd was in the thick of the fighting at Antietam, and McKinley came under heavy fire when bringing rations to the men on the line. (Note: In 1896, some of McKinley's comrades lobbied for him to be belatedly awarded the Medal of Honor for his bravery that day; Lieutenant General Nelson A. Miles was inclined to grant McKinley the award, but when the then-President-elect heard about the effort, he declined it. See Armstrong, pp. 38–41; Phillips, p. 21.) McKinley's regiment suffered many casualties, but the Army of the Potomac was victorious, and the Confederates retreated into Virginia. McKinley's regiment was detached from the Army of the Potomac and returned by train to western Virginia.

=== Shenandoah Valley and promotion ===
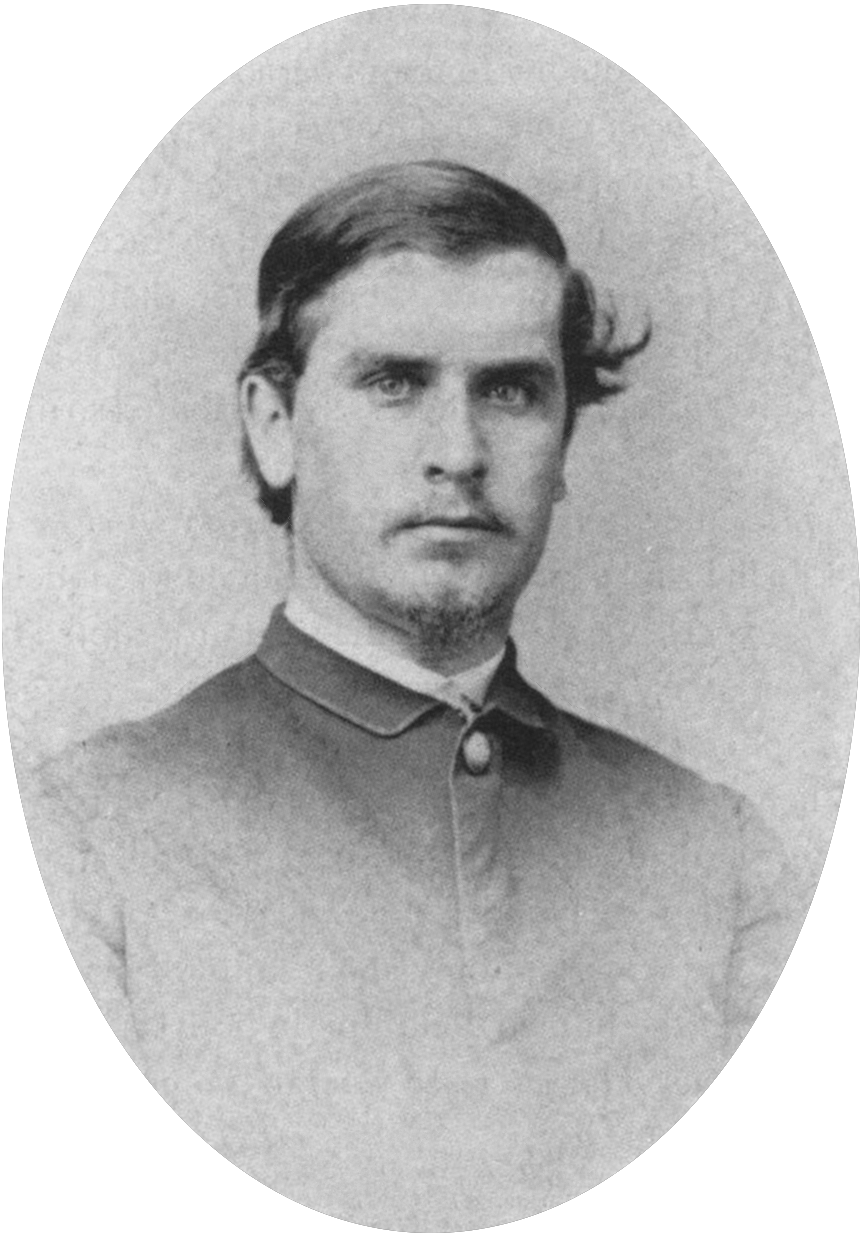
McKinley in 1865, just after the Civil War, photograph by Mathew Brady

While the regiment went into winter quarters near Charleston, Virginia (present-day West Virginia), McKinley was ordered back to Ohio with some other sergeants to recruit fresh troops. When they arrived in Columbus, Governor David Tod surprised McKinley with a commission as second lieutenant in recognition of his service at Antietam. McKinley and his comrades saw little action until July 1863, when the division skirmished with John Hunt Morgan's cavalry at the Battle of Buffington Island. Early in 1864, the Army command structure in West Virginia was reorganized, and the division was assigned to George Crook's Army of West Virginia. They soon resumed the offensive, marching into southwestern Virginia to destroy salt and lead mines used by the enemy. On May 9, the army engaged Confederate troops at Cloyd's Mountain, where the men charged the enemy entrenchments and drove the rebels from the field. McKinley later said the combat there was "as desperate as any witnessed during the war". Following the rout, the Union forces destroyed Confederate supplies and skirmished with the enemy again successfully.

McKinley and his regiment moved to the Shenandoah Valley as the armies broke from winter quarters to resume hostilities. Crook's corps was attached to Major General David Hunter's Army of the Shenandoah and soon back in contact with Confederate forces, capturing Lexington, Virginia, on June 11. They continued south toward Lynchburg, tearing up railroad track as they advanced. But Hunter believed the troops at Lynchburg were too powerful, and the brigade returned to West Virginia. Before the army could make another attempt, Confederate General Jubal Early's raid into Maryland forced their recall to the north.

Early's army surprised them at Kernstown on July 24, where McKinley came under heavy fire and the army was defeated. Retreating into Maryland, the army was reorganized again: Major General Philip Sheridan replaced Hunter, and McKinley, who had been promoted to captain after the battle, was transferred to General Crook's staff. By August, Early was retreating south in the valley, with Sheridan's army in pursuit. They fended off a Confederate assault at Berryville, where McKinley had a horse shot out from under him, and advanced to Opequon Creek, where they broke the enemy lines and pursued them farther south. They followed up the victory with another at Fisher's Hill on September 22 and were engaged once more at Cedar Creek on October 19. After initially falling back from the Confederate advance, McKinley helped to rally the troops and turn the tide of the battle.

After Cedar Creek, the army stayed in the vicinity through election day, when McKinley cast his first presidential ballot, for the incumbent Republican, Abraham Lincoln. The next day, they moved north up the valley into winter quarters near Kernstown. In February 1865, Crook was captured by Confederate raiders. Crook's capture added to the confusion as the army was reorganized for the spring campaign, and McKinley served on the staffs of four different generals over the next fifteen days—Crook, John D. Stevenson, Samuel S. Carroll, and Winfield S. Hancock. Finally assigned to Carroll's staff again, McKinley acted as the general's first and only adjutant.

Lee and his army surrendered to General Ulysses S. Grant a few days later, effectively ending the war. McKinley joined a Freemason lodge (later renamed after him) in Winchester, Virginia, before he and Carroll were transferred to Hancock's First Veterans Corps in Washington. Just before the war's end, McKinley received his final promotion, a brevet commission as major. In July, the Veterans Corps was mustered out of service, and McKinley and Carroll were relieved of their duties. Carroll and Hancock encouraged McKinley to apply for a place in the peacetime army, but he declined and returned to Ohio the following month.

McKinley, along with Samuel M. Taylor and James C. Howe, co-authored and published a twelve-volume work, Official Roster of the Soldiers of the State of Ohio in the War of the Rebellion, 1861–1866, published in 1886.

== Legal career and marriage ==
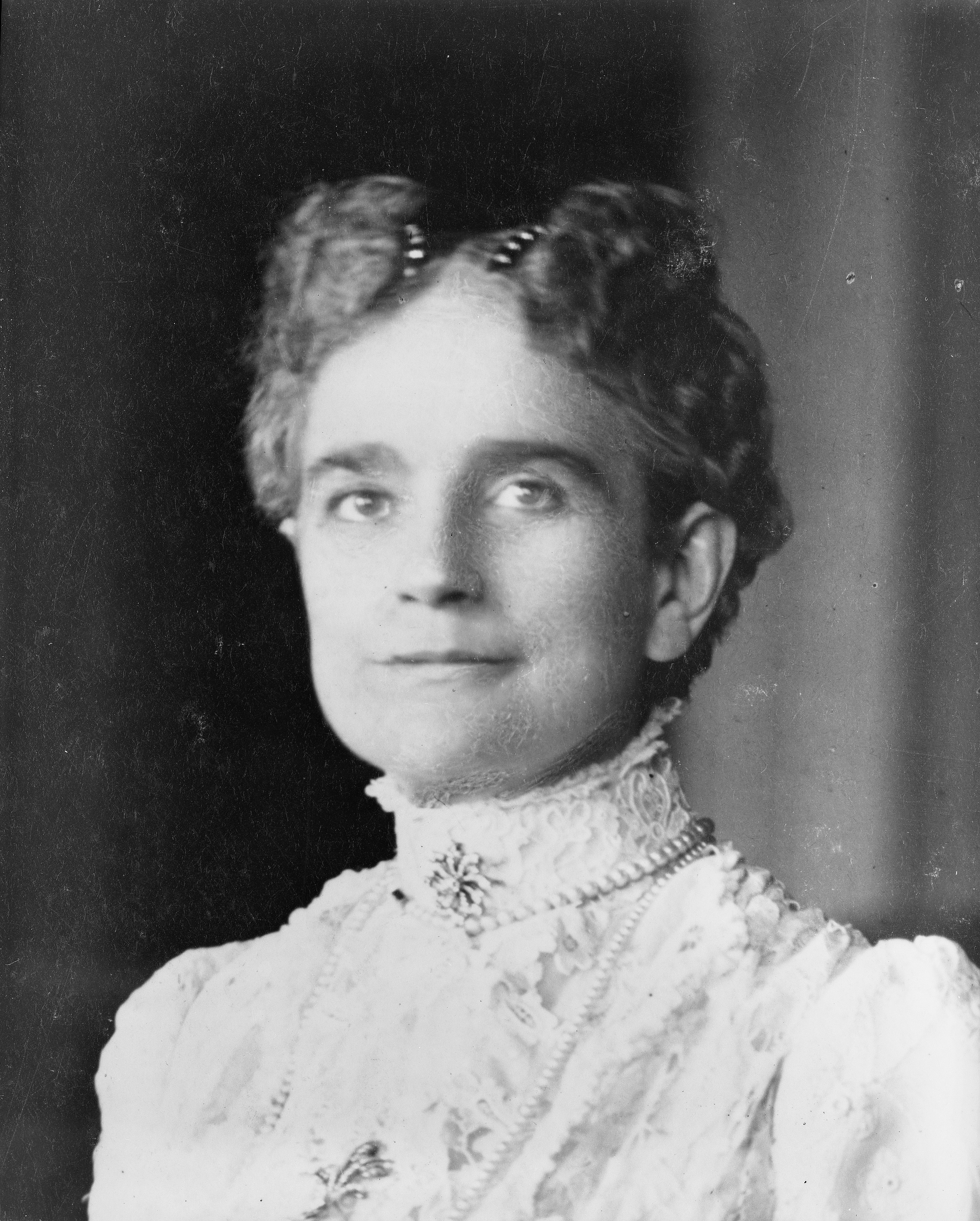
Ida Saxton McKinley

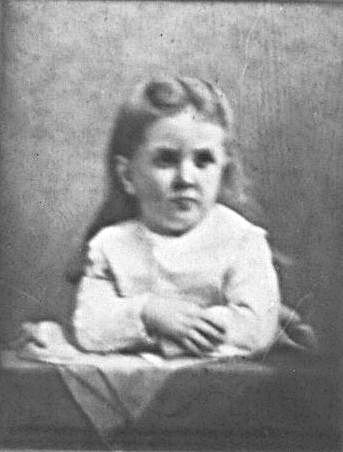
Katherine McKinley

After the war ended in 1865, McKinley decided on a career in law and began studying in the office of an attorney in Poland, Ohio. The following year, he continued his studies by attending Albany Law School in New York state. After studying there for less than a year, McKinley returned home and in March 1867 was admitted to the bar in Warren, Ohio.

That same year, he moved to Canton, the county seat of Stark County, Ohio, and set up a small office. He soon formed a partnership with George W. Belden, an experienced lawyer and former judge. His practice was successful enough for him to buy a block of buildings on Main Street in Canton, which provided him with a small but consistent rental income for decades.

When his Army friend Rutherford B. Hayes was nominated for governor in 1867, McKinley made speeches on his behalf in Stark County, his first foray into politics. The county was closely divided between Democrats and Republicans, but Hayes carried it that year in his statewide victory. In 1869, McKinley ran for the office of prosecuting attorney of Stark County, an office that had historically been held by Democrats, and was unexpectedly elected. When McKinley ran for reelection in 1871, the Democrats nominated William A. Lynch, a prominent local lawyer, and McKinley was defeated by 143 votes.

As McKinley's professional career progressed, his social life blossomed: he wooed Ida Saxton, a daughter of a prominent Canton family. They married on January 25, 1871, in the newly built First Presbyterian Church of Canton. Ida soon joined her husband's Methodist church. Their first child, Katherine, was born on Christmas Day 1871. A second daughter, Ida, followed in 1873 but died the same year. McKinley's wife descended into a deep depression at her baby's death and her health, never robust, declined. Two years later, Katherine died of typhoid fever. Ida never recovered from their daughters' deaths, and the McKinleys had no more children. Ida McKinley developed epilepsy around the same time and depended strongly on her husband's presence. He remained a devoted husband and tended to his wife's medical and emotional needs for the rest of his life.

Ida insisted that her husband continue his increasingly successful career in law and politics. He attended the state Republican convention that nominated Hayes for a third term as governor in 1875, and campaigned again for his old friend in the election that fall. The next year, McKinley undertook a high-profile case defending a group of striking coal miners, who were arrested for rioting after a clash with strikebreakers. Lynch, McKinley's opponent in the 1871 election, and his partner, William R. Day, were the opposing counsel, and the mine owners included Mark Hanna, a Cleveland businessman. Taking the case pro bono, McKinley got all but one of the miners acquitted. The case raised McKinley's standing among laborers, a crucial part of the Stark County electorate, and also introduced him to Hanna, who became his strongest backer in years to come.

McKinley's good standing with labor became useful that year as he campaigned for the Republican nomination for Ohio's 17th congressional district. Delegates to the county conventions thought he could attract blue-collar voters, and in August 1876, McKinley was nominated. By that time, Hayes had been nominated for president, and McKinley campaigned for him while running his own congressional campaign. Both were successful. McKinley, campaigning mostly on his support for a protective tariff, defeated the Democratic nominee, Levi L. Lamborn, by 3,300 votes. Hayes won a hotly disputed election to reach the presidency. McKinley's victory came at a personal cost: his income as a congressman would be half of what he earned as a lawyer.

== Rising politician (1877–1895) ==
=== Spokesman for protection ===
Under free trade the trader is the master and the producer the slave. Protection is but the law of nature, the law of self-preservation, of self-development, of securing the highest and best destiny of the race of man. [It is said] that protection is immoral ... Why, if protection builds up and elevates 63,000,000 [the U.S. population] of people, the influence of those 63,000,000 of people elevates the rest of the world. We cannot take a step in the pathway of progress without benefiting mankind everywhere. Well, they say, "Buy where you can buy the cheapest" ... Of course, that applies to labor as to everything else. Let me give you a maxim that is a thousand times better than that, and it is the protection maxim: "Buy where you can pay the easiest." And that spot of earth is where labor wins its highest rewards.

— William McKinley, speech made October 4, 1892, Boston, Massachusetts

McKinley took his congressional seat in October 1877, when President Hayes summoned Congress into special session. (Note: Until the ratification of the 20th Amendment in 1933, the Constitution prescribed that Congress begin its regular sessions in early December. See US Senate, US Congress.) With the Republicans in the minority, McKinley was given unimportant committee assignments, which he undertook conscientiously. McKinley's friendship with Hayes did McKinley little good on Capitol Hill, as the president was not well regarded by many leaders there. The young congressman broke with Hayes on the question of the currency, but it did not affect their friendship. The United States had effectively been placed on the gold standard by the Coinage Act of 1873; when silver prices dropped significantly, many sought to make silver again a legal tender, equally with gold. Such a course would be inflationary, but advocates argued that the economic benefits of the increased money supply would be worth the inflation; opponents warned that "free silver" would not bring the promised benefits and would harm the United States in international trade. McKinley voted for the Bland–Allison Act of 1878, which mandated large government purchases of silver for striking into money, and also joined the large majorities in each house that overrode Hayes's veto of the legislation. In so doing, McKinley voted against the position of the House Republican leader, James Garfield, a fellow Ohioan and his friend.

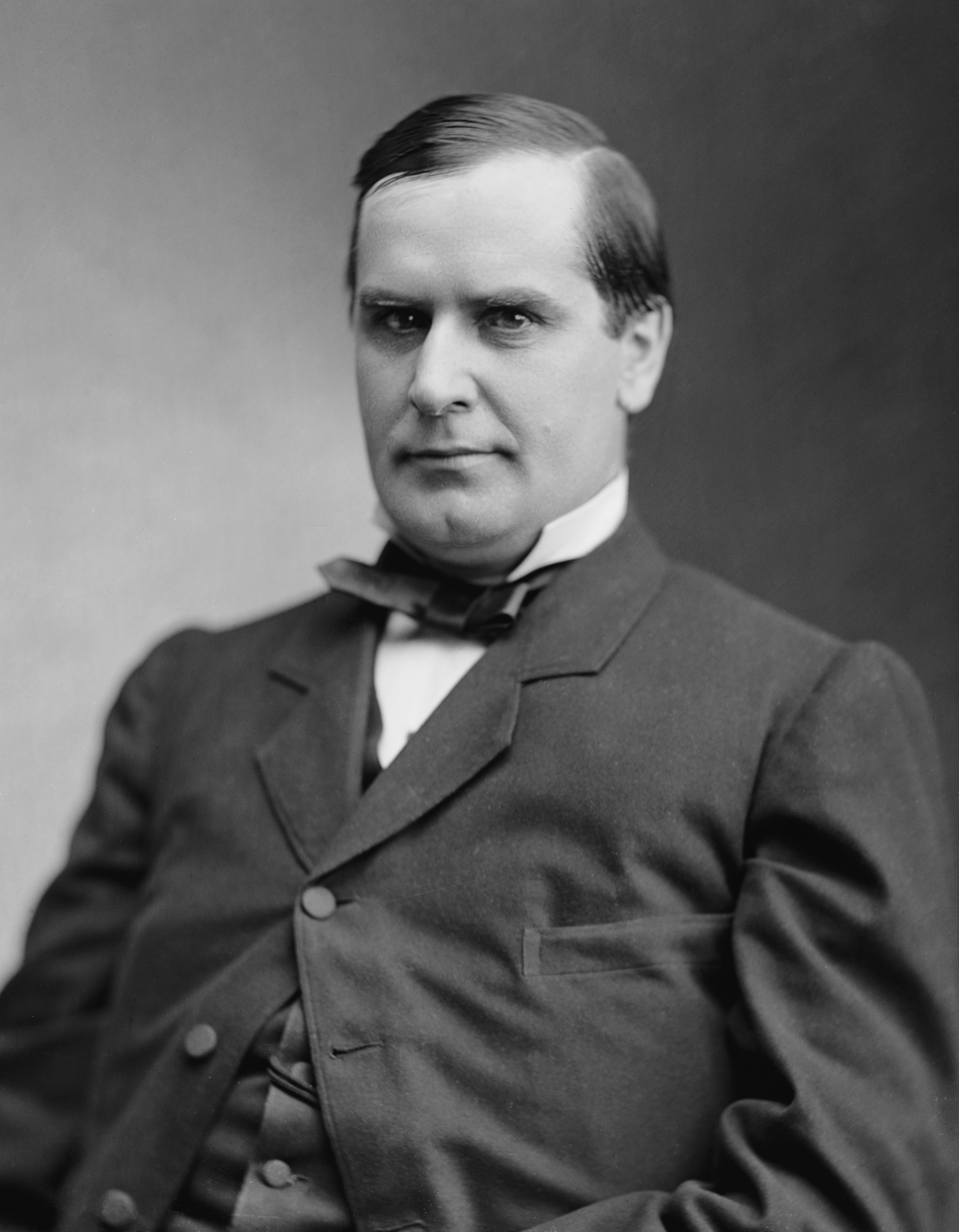
McKinley as a Representative c. 1870s

From his first term in Congress, McKinley was a strong advocate of protective tariffs. Their primary purpose was not to raise revenue, but to allow American manufacturing to develop by giving it a price advantage in the domestic market over foreign competitors. McKinley biographer Margaret Leech noted that Canton had become prosperous as a center for the manufacture of farm equipment because of protection, and that this may have helped form his political views. McKinley introduced and supported bills that raised protective tariffs, and opposed those that lowered them or imposed tariffs simply to raise revenue. Garfield's election as president in 1880 created a vacancy on the House Ways and Means Committee; McKinley was selected to fill it, gaining a spot on the most powerful committee after only two terms.

McKinley increasingly became a significant figure in national politics. In 1880, he served a brief term as Ohio's representative on the Republican National Committee. In 1884, he was elected a delegate to that year's Republican convention, where he chaired the Committee on Resolutions and won plaudits for his handling of the convention when called upon to preside. By 1886, McKinley, Senator John Sherman, and Governor Joseph B. Foraker were considered the leaders of the Republican party in Ohio. Sherman, who had helped to found the Republican Party, ran three times for the Republican nomination for president in the 1880s, each time failing, while Foraker began a meteoric rise in Ohio politics early in the decade. Hanna, once he entered public affairs as a political manager and generous contributor, supported Sherman's ambitions, as well as Foraker's. The latter relationship broke off at the 1888 Republican National Convention, where McKinley, Foraker, and Hanna were all delegates supporting Sherman. Convinced Sherman could not win, Foraker threw his support to Maine Senator James G. Blaine, the unsuccessful Republican 1884 presidential nominee. When Blaine said he was not a candidate, Foraker returned to Sherman, but the nomination went to former Indiana senator Benjamin Harrison, who was elected president. In the bitterness that followed the convention, Hanna abandoned Foraker. For the rest of McKinley's life, the Ohio Republican Party was divided into two factions, one aligned with McKinley, Sherman, and Hanna, and the other with Foraker. Hanna came to admire McKinley and became a friend and close adviser to him. Although Hanna remained active in business and in promoting other Republicans, in the years after 1888, he spent an increasing amount of time boosting McKinley's political career.

In 1889, with the Republicans in the majority, McKinley sought election as Speaker of the House. He failed to gain the post, which went to Thomas B. Reed of Maine, but Reed appointed McKinley chairman of the Ways and Means Committee. The Ohioan guided the McKinley Tariff of 1890 through Congress; although McKinley's work was altered through the influence of special interests in the Senate, it imposed a number of protective tariffs on foreign goods.

=== Gerrymandering and defeat for reelection ===
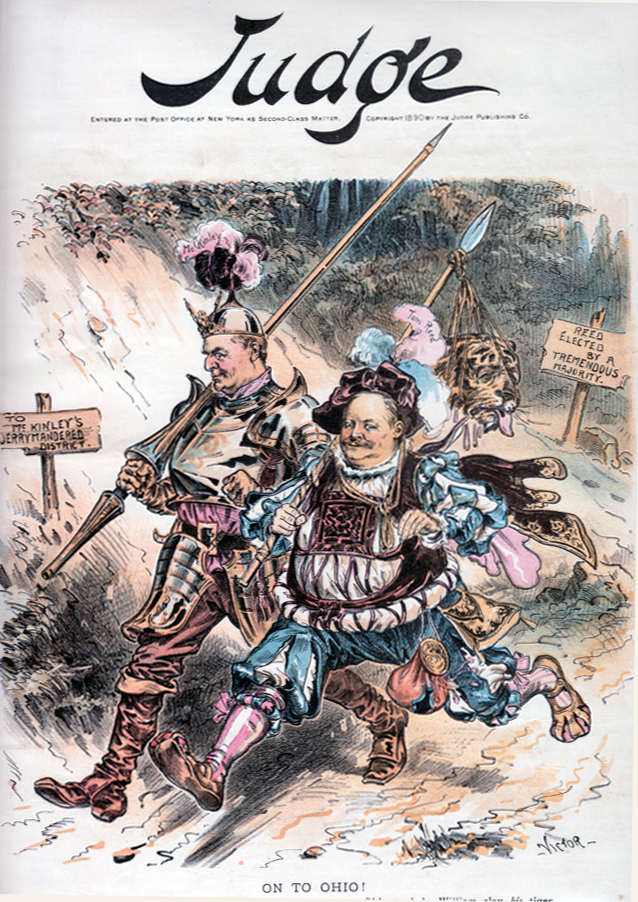
Judge magazine cover from September 1890, showing McKinley (left) having helped dispatch Speaker Reed's opponent in early-voting Maine, hurrying off with the victor to McKinley's "jerrymandered" Ohio district

Recognizing McKinley's potential, the Democrats, whenever they controlled the Ohio legislature, sought to gerrymander or redistrict him out of office. In 1878, McKinley was redistricted to the 16th congressional district; he won anyway, causing Hayes to exult, "Oh, the good luck of McKinley! He was gerrymandered out and then beat the gerrymander! We enjoyed it as much as he did." After the 1882 election, McKinley was unseated in an election contest by a near party-line House vote. Out of office, he was briefly depressed by the setback, but soon vowed to run again. The Democrats again redistricted Stark County for the 1884 election; McKinley was returned to Congress anyway.

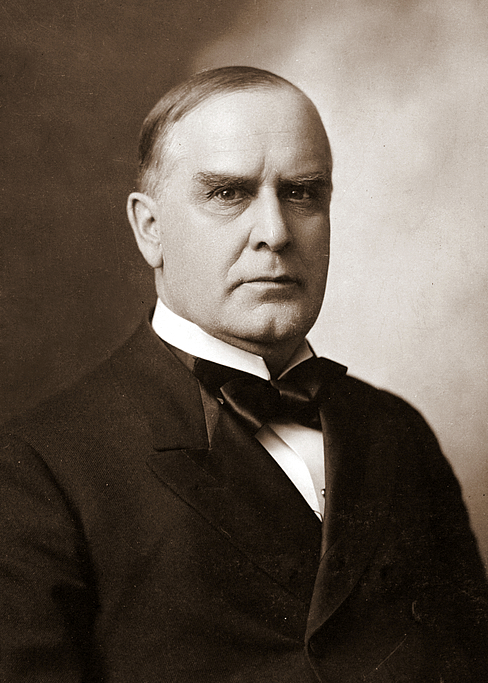
McKinley in 1896

For 1890, the Democrats gerrymandered McKinley one final time, placing Stark County in the same district as one of the strongest pro-Democrat counties, Holmes, populated by solidly Democratic Pennsylvania Dutch. Based on past results, Democrats thought the new boundaries should produce a Democratic majority of 2,000 to 3,000. The Republicans could not reverse the gerrymander, as legislative elections would not be held until 1891, but they could throw all their energies into the district. The McKinley Tariff was a main theme of the Democratic campaign nationwide, and considerable attention was paid to McKinley's race. The Republican Party sent its leading orators to Canton, including Blaine (then Secretary of State), Speaker Reed, and President Harrison. The Democrats countered with their best spokesmen on tariff issues. McKinley tirelessly stumped his new district, reaching out to its 40,000 voters to explain that his tariff:

was framed for the people ... as a defense to their industries, as a protection to the labor of their hands, as a safeguard to the happy homes of American workingmen, and as a security to their education, their wages, and their investments ... It will bring to this country a prosperity unparalleled in our own history and unrivalled in the history of the world."

Democrats ran a strong candidate in former lieutenant governor John G. Warwick. To drive their point home, they hired young partisans to pretend to be peddlers, who went door to door offering 25-cent tinware to housewives for 50 cents, explaining the rise in prices was due to the McKinley Tariff. In the end, McKinley lost by 300 votes, but the Republicans won a statewide majority and claimed a moral victory.

=== Governor of Ohio (1892–1896) ===
Even before McKinley completed his term in Congress, he met with a delegation of Ohioans urging him to run for governor. Governor James E. Campbell, a Democrat, who had defeated Foraker in 1889, was to seek reelection in 1891. The Ohio Republican party remained divided, but McKinley quietly arranged for Foraker to nominate him at the 1891 state Republican convention, which chose McKinley by acclamation. The former congressman spent much of the second half of 1891 campaigning against Campbell, beginning in his birthplace of Niles. Hanna was little seen in the campaign; he spent much of his time raising funds for the election of legislators pledged to vote for Sherman in the 1892 senatorial election (state legislators still elected US Senators). (Note: Before the passage of the Seventeenth Amendment to the United States Constitution in 1913, senators were elected by state legislatures.) McKinley won the 1891 election by some 20,000 votes; in January, Sherman, with considerable assistance from Hanna, turned back a challenge by Foraker to win the legislature's vote for another term in the US Senate.

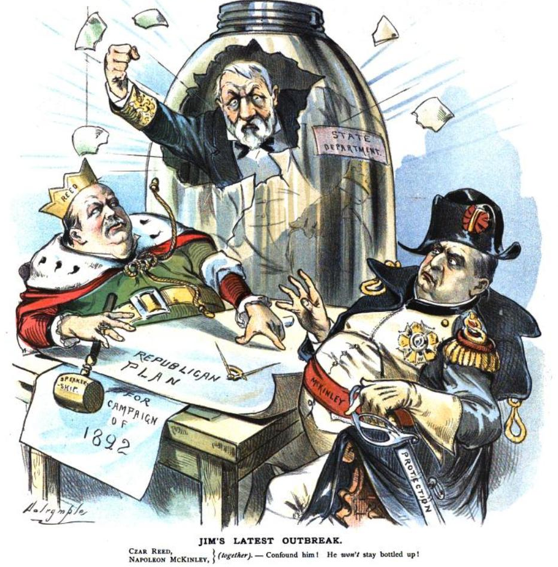
Even after his final run for president in 1884, James G. Blaine was still seen as a possible candidate for the Republican nomination. In this 1890 Puck cartoon, he is startling Reed and McKinley (right) as they make their plans for 1892.

Ohio's governor had relatively little power—for example, he could recommend legislation, but not veto it—but with Ohio a key swing state, its governor was a major figure in national politics. McKinley believed the nation's health depended on that of business, but he was evenhanded in dealing with labor. He procured legislation that set up an arbitration board to settle work disputes and obtained passage of a law that fined employers who fired workers for belonging to a union.

President Harrison had proven unpopular; there were divisions even within the Republican party as the 1892 began and Harrison sought reelection. No declared Republican candidate opposed Harrison, but many Republicans were ready to dump him from the ticket if an alternative emerged. Among the possible candidates spoken of were McKinley, Reed, and the aging Blaine. Fearing that the Ohio governor would emerge as a candidate, Harrison's managers arranged for McKinley to be permanent chairman of the convention in Minneapolis, requiring him to play a public, neutral role. Hanna established an unofficial McKinley headquarters near the convention hall, though no active effort was made to convert delegates to McKinley's cause. McKinley objected to delegate votes being cast for him; nevertheless he finished second, behind the renominated Harrison, but ahead of Blaine, who had sent word he did not want to be considered. McKinley campaigned loyally for the Republican ticket, but Harrison lost to former President Cleveland in the November election. In the wake of Cleveland's victory, McKinley was seen by some as the likely Republican candidate in 1896.

Soon after Cleveland's return to office, hard times struck the nation with the Panic of 1893. A businessman in Youngstown, Robert Walker, had lent McKinley money in their youth; in gratitude, McKinley had often guaranteed Walker's borrowings for his business. The governor had never kept track of what he was signing; he believed Walker a sound businessman. In fact, Walker had deceived McKinley, telling him that new notes were actually renewals of matured ones. Walker was ruined by the recession; McKinley was called upon for repayment in February 1893. The total owed was over $100,000 (equivalent to $3.6 million in 2025) and a despairing McKinley initially proposed to resign as governor and earn the money as an attorney. Instead, McKinley's wealthy supporters, including Hanna and Chicago publisher H. H. Kohlsaat, became trustees of a fund from which the notes would be paid. William and Ida McKinley placed their property in the hands of the fund's trustees (who included Hanna and Kohlsaat), and the supporters raised and contributed a substantial sum. All the couple's property was returned to them by the end of 1893, and when McKinley, who had promised eventual repayment, asked for the list of contributors, it was refused him. Many people who had suffered in the hard times sympathized with McKinley, whose popularity grew. He was easily reelected in November 1893, receiving the largest percentage of the vote of any Ohio governor since the Civil War.

McKinley campaigned widely for Republicans in the 1894 midterm congressional elections; many party candidates in districts where he spoke were successful. His political efforts in Ohio were rewarded with the election in November 1895 of a Republican successor as governor, Asa Bushnell, and a Republican legislature that elected Foraker to the Senate. McKinley supported Foraker for the Senate and Bushnell (who was of Foraker's faction) for governor; in return, the new senator-elect agreed to back McKinley's presidential ambitions. With party peace in Ohio assured, McKinley turned to the national arena.

== Election of 1896 ==
=== Obtaining the nomination ===
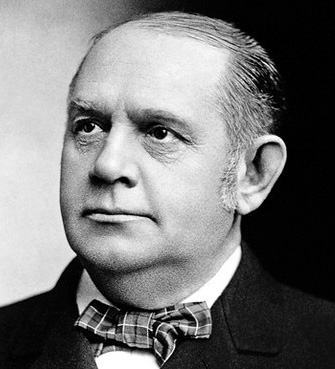
McKinley's close friend and adviser, Mark Hanna

It is unclear when McKinley began to seriously prepare a run for president. His biographer Kevin Phillips notes, "No documents, no diaries, no confidential letters to Mark Hanna (or anyone else) contain his secret hopes or veiled stratagems." From the beginning, McKinley's preparations had the participation of Hanna, whose biographer William T. Horner noted, "What is certainly true is that in 1888 the two men began to develop a close working relationship that helped put McKinley in the White House." Sherman did not run for president again after 1888, and so Hanna could support McKinley's ambitions for that office wholeheartedly.

Backed by Hanna's money and organizational skills, McKinley quietly built support for a presidential bid through 1895 and early 1896. When other contenders such as Speaker Reed and Iowa Senator William B. Allison sent agents outside their states to organize Republicans in support of their candidacies, they found that Hanna's agents had preceded them. According to historian Stanley Jones in his study of the 1896 election:

Another feature common to the Reed and Allison campaigns was their failure to make headway against the tide which was running toward McKinley. In fact, both campaigns from the moment they were launched were in retreat. The calm confidence with which each candidate claimed the support of his own section [of the country] soon gave way to ... bitter accusations that Hanna by winning support for McKinley in their sections had violated the rules of the game.

On McKinley's behalf, Hanna met with the eastern Republican political bosses, such as Thomas Platt of New York and Senator Matthew Quay of Pennsylvania, who were willing to guarantee McKinley's nomination in exchange for promises regarding patronage and offices. But McKinley was determined to obtain the nomination without making deals, and Hanna accepted that decision. Many of their early efforts focused on the South; Hanna obtained a vacation home in southern Georgia where McKinley visited and met with Republican politicians from the region. McKinley needed 453½ delegate votes to gain the nomination; he gained nearly half that number from the South and border states. Platt lamented in his memoirs, "[Hanna] had the South practically solid before some of us awakened."

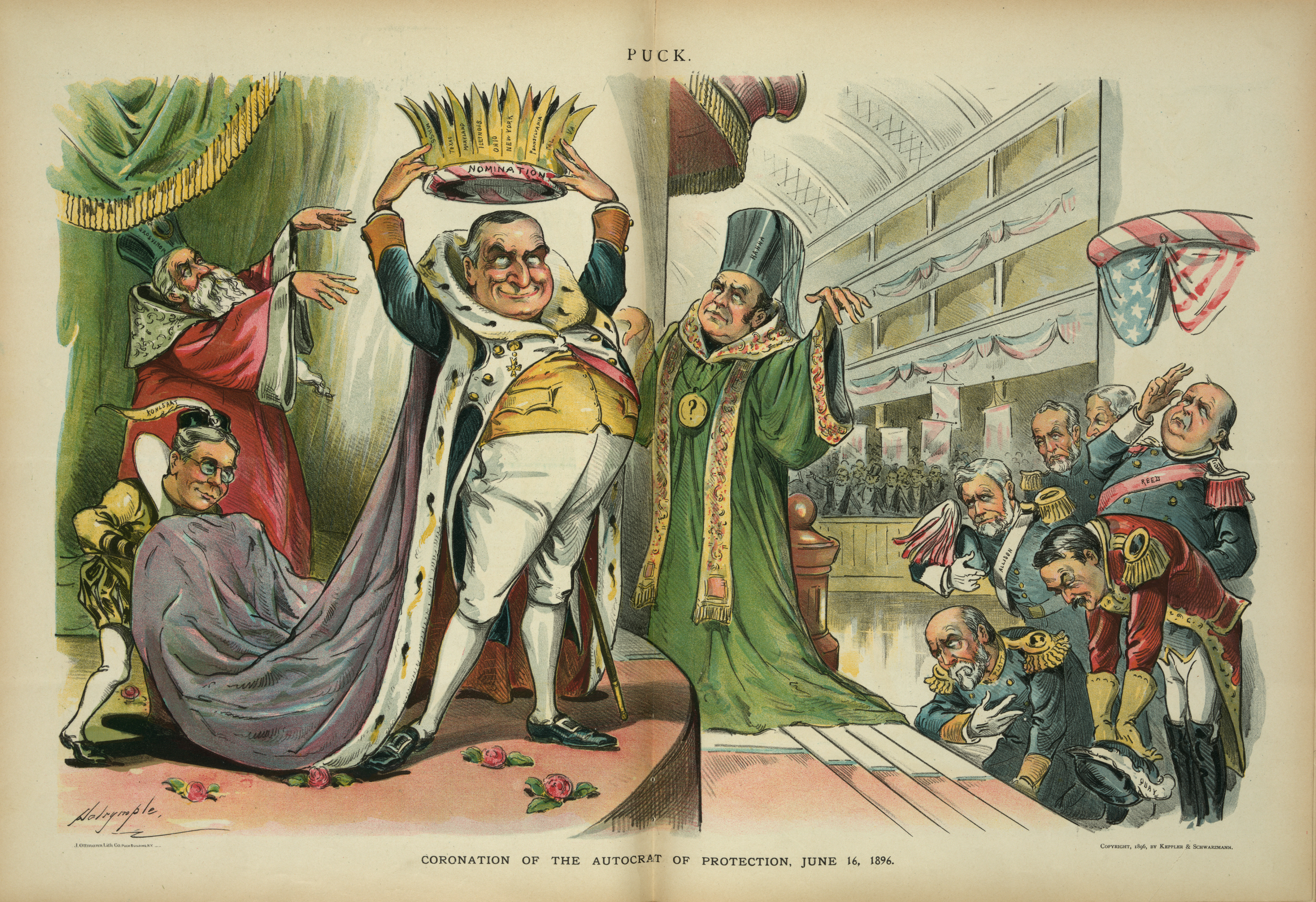
Louis Dalrymple cartoon from Puck magazine, June 24, 1896, showing McKinley about to crown himself with the Republican nomination. The "priests" are Hanna (in green) and Representative Charles H. Grosvenor (red); H. H. Kohlsaat is the page holding the robe.

Quay and Platt still hoped to deny McKinley a first-ballot majority at the convention by boosting support for local favorite son candidates such as Quay himself, New York Governor (and former vice president) Levi P. Morton, and Illinois Senator Shelby Cullom. Delegate-rich Illinois proved a crucial battleground, as McKinley supporters, such as Chicago businessman (and future vice president) Charles G. Dawes, sought to elect delegates pledged to vote for McKinley at the national convention in St. Louis. Cullom proved unable to stand against McKinley despite the local Republican machines' support; at the state convention in April, McKinley completed a near-sweep of Illinois's delegates. Former president Harrison had been deemed a possible contender if he entered the race; when Harrison made known he would not seek a third nomination, the McKinley organization took control of Indiana with a speed Harrison found unseemly. Morton operatives who journeyed to Indiana sent word that they had found the state alive for McKinley. Wyoming Senator Francis Warren wrote, "The politicians are making a hard fight against him, but if the masses could speak, McKinley is the choice of at least 75% of the entire [body of] Republican voters in the Union".

By the time the national convention began in St. Louis on June 16, 1896, McKinley had an ample majority of delegates. The former governor, who remained in Canton, followed events at the convention closely by telephone, and was able to hear part of Foraker's speech nominating him. When Ohio was reached in the roll call of states, its votes gave McKinley the nomination, which he celebrated by hugging his wife and mother as his friends fled the house, anticipating the first of many crowds that gathered at the Republican candidate's home. Thousands of partisans came from Canton and surrounding towns that evening to hear McKinley speak from his front porch. The convention nominated Republican National Committee vice chairman Garret Hobart of New Jersey for vice president, a choice actually made, by most accounts, by Hanna. Hobart, a wealthy lawyer, businessman, and former state legislator, was not widely known, but as Hanna biographer Herbert Croly pointed out, "if he did little to strengthen the ticket he did nothing to weaken it".

=== General election campaign ===
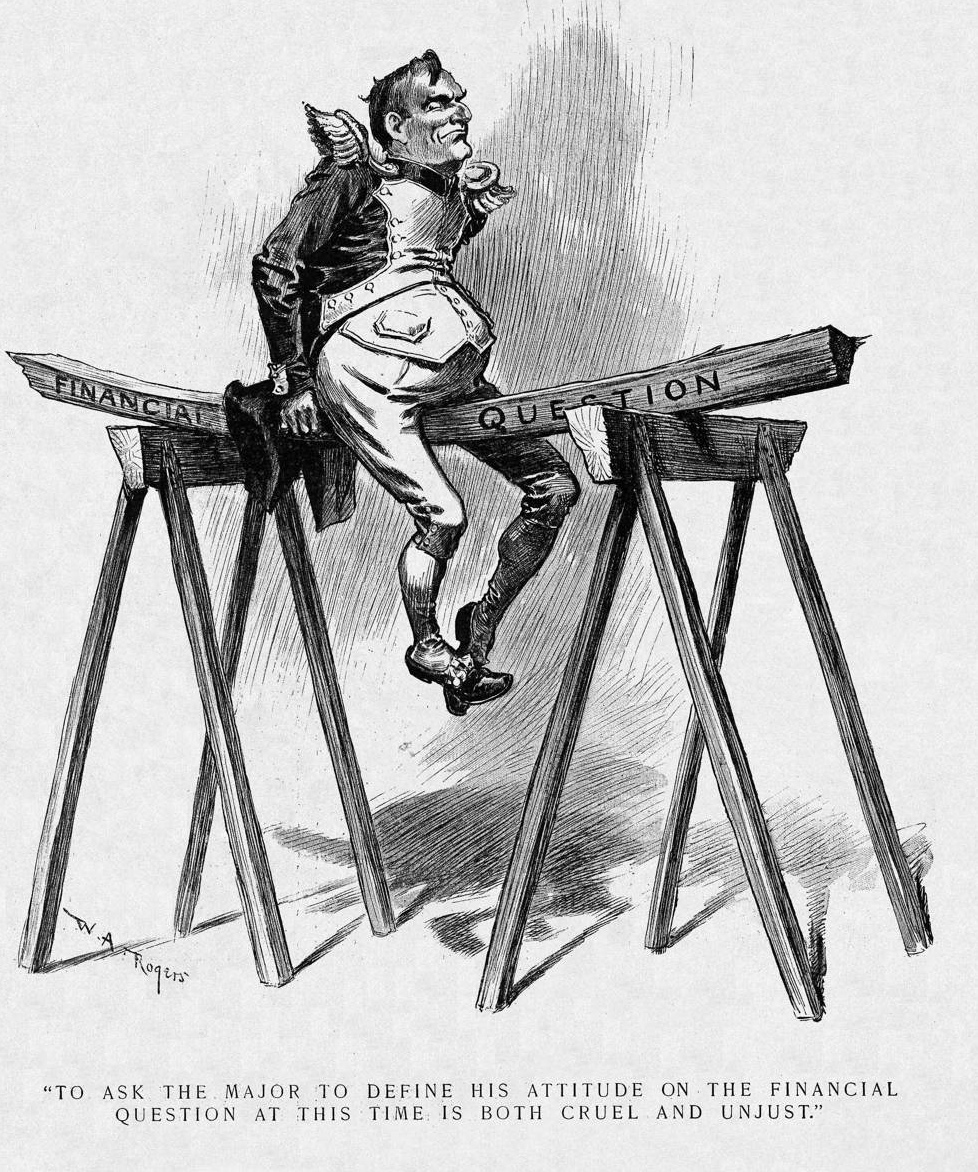
Before the 1896 convention, McKinley tried to avoid coming down on one side or the other of the currency question. William Allen Rogers's cartoon from Harper's Weekly, June 1896, showing McKinley riding the rail of the currency question.

Before the Republican convention, McKinley had been a "straddle bug" on the currency question, favoring moderate positions on silver such as accomplishing bimetallism by international agreement. In the final days before the convention, McKinley decided, after hearing from politicians and businessmen, that the platform should endorse the gold standard, though it should allow for bimetallism through coordination with other nations. Adoption of the platform caused some western delegates, led by Colorado Senator Henry M. Teller, to walk out of the convention. But compared with the Democrats, Republican divisions on the issue were small, especially as McKinley promised future concessions to silver advocates.

The bad economic times had continued and strengthened the hand of forces for free silver. The issue bitterly divided the Democratic Party; Cleveland firmly supported the gold standard, but an increasing number of rural Democrats wanted silver, especially in the South and West. The silverites took control of the 1896 Democratic National Convention and chose William Jennings Bryan for president; he had electrified the delegates with his Cross of Gold speech. Bryan's financial radicalism shocked bankers—they thought his inflationary program would bankrupt the railroads and ruin the economy. Hanna approached them for support for his strategy to win the election, and they gave $3.5 million for speakers and over 200 million pamphlets advocating the Republican position on the money and tariff questions.

McKinley speaks from his front porch
Historic recording of William McKinley. The final 1:08 of this sound file (starting at 5:40) contains an excerpt from one of his 1896 campaign speeches.

Bryan's campaign had at most an estimated $500,000. With his eloquence and youthful energy his major assets in the race, Bryan decided on a whistle-stop political tour by train on an unprecedented scale. Hanna urged McKinley to match Bryan's tour with one of his own; the candidate declined on the grounds that the Democrat was a better stump speaker: "I might just as well set up a trapeze on my front lawn and compete with some professional athlete as go out speaking against Bryan. I have to think when I speak." Instead of going to the people, McKinley remained at home in Canton and allowed the people to come to him; according to historian R. Hal Williams in his book on the 1896 election, "it was, as it turned out, a brilliant strategy. McKinley's 'Front Porch Campaign' became a legend in American political history."

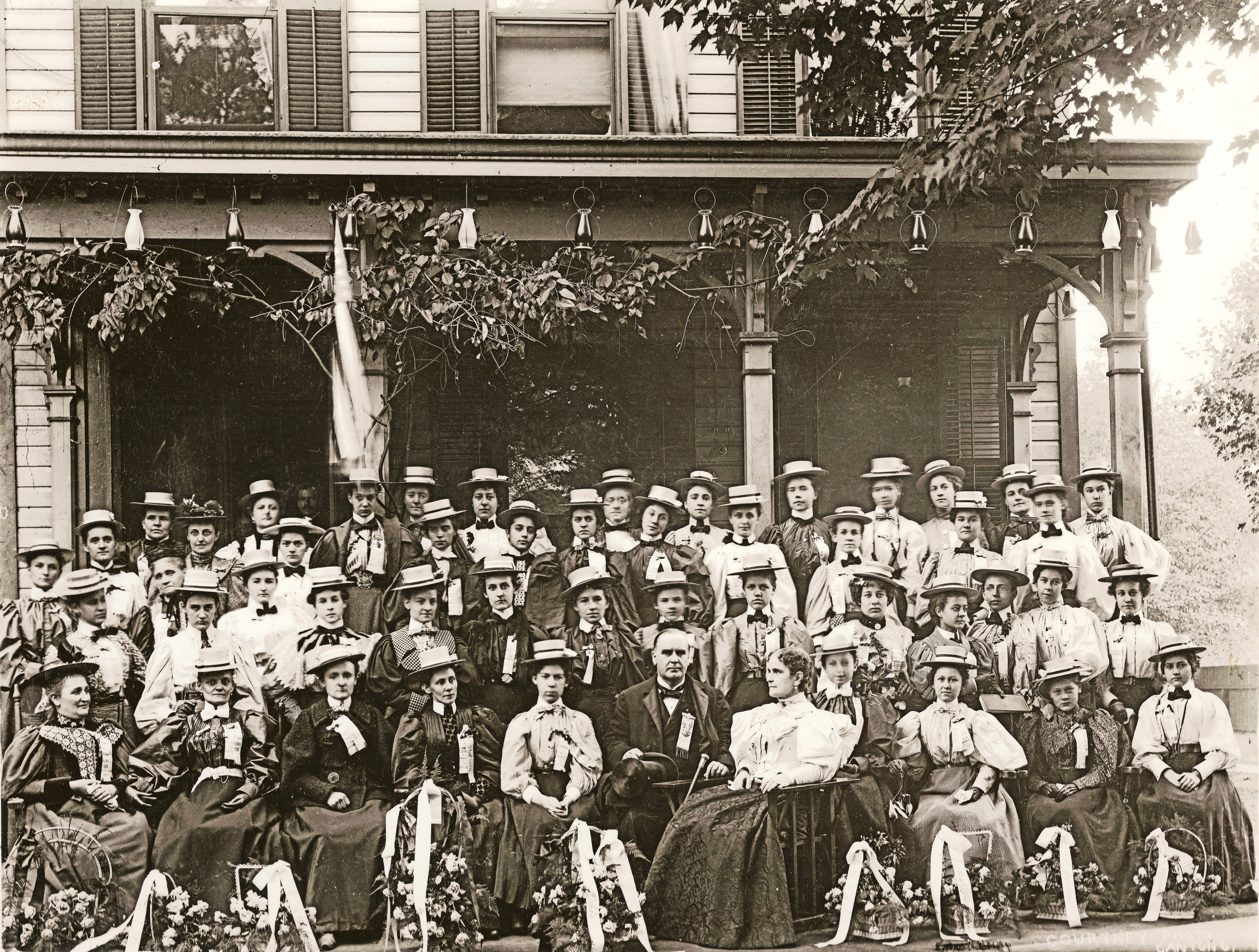
William and Ida McKinley (to her husband's left) pose with members of the "Flower Delegation" from Oil City, Pennsylvania, before the McKinley home. Although women could not vote in most states, they might influence male relatives and were encouraged to visit Canton.

McKinley made himself available to the public every day except Sunday, receiving delegations from his porch. The railroads subsidized the visitors with low excursion rates—the pro-silver Cleveland Plain Dealer disgustedly wrote that going to Canton had been made "cheaper than staying at home". Delegations marched through the streets from the railroad station to McKinley's home on North Market Street. Once there, they crowded close to the porch—from which they surreptitiously whittled souvenirs—as their spokesman addressed McKinley. The candidate then responded, speaking on campaign issues in a speech molded to suit the delegation's interest. The speeches were carefully scripted to avoid extemporaneous remarks; even the spokesman's remarks were approved by McKinley or a representative. This was done as the candidate feared an offhand comment by another that might rebound on him, as had happened to Blaine in 1884.

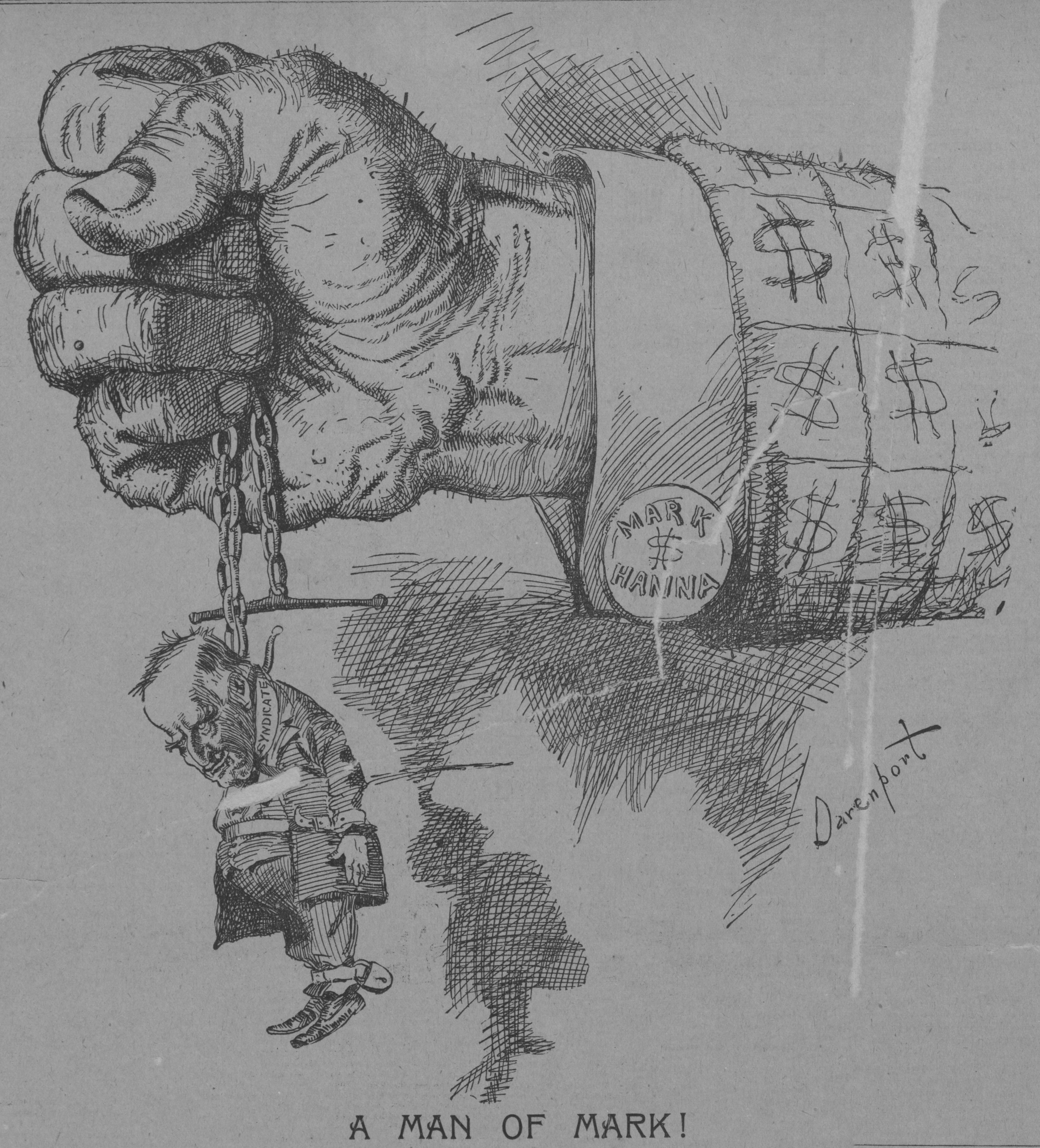
A Man of Mark 1896 Homer Davenport cartoon of McKinley as Hanna's creature, from William Randolph Hearst's New York Journal

Most Democratic newspapers refused to support Bryan, the major exception being the New York Journal, controlled by William Randolph Hearst, whose fortune was based on silver mines. In biased reporting and through the sharp cartoons of Homer Davenport, Hanna was viciously characterized as a plutocrat, trampling on labor. McKinley was drawn as a child, easily controlled by big business. These depictions still color the images of Hanna and McKinley: one as a heartless businessman, the other as a creature of Hanna and others of his ilk.

The Democrats had pamphlets too, though not as many. Jones analyzed how voters responded to the education campaigns of the two parties:

For the people it was a campaign of study and analysis, of exhortation and conviction—a campaign of search for economic and political truth. Pamphlets tumbled from the presses, to be read, reread, studied, debated, to become guides to economic thought and political action. They were printed and distributed by the million ... but the people hankered for more. Favorite pamphlets became dog-eared, grimy, fell apart as their owners laboriously restudied their arguments and quoted from them in public and private debate.

McKinley always thought of himself as a tariff man and expected that the monetary issues would fade in a month. He was mistaken; silver and gold dominated the campaign.

The battleground proved to be the Midwest—the South and most of the West were conceded to Bryan—and the Democrat spent much of his time in those crucial states. The Northeast was considered most likely safe for McKinley after the early-voting states of Maine and Vermont supported him in September. By then, it was clear that public support for silver had receded, and McKinley began to emphasize the tariff issue. By the end of September, the Republicans had discontinued printing material on the silver issue and were entirely concentrating on the tariff question. On November 3, 1896, McKinley won the entire Northeast and Midwest; he won 51% of the vote and an ample majority in the Electoral College. Bryan had concentrated entirely on the silver issue and had not appealed to urban workers. Voters in cities supported McKinley; the only city outside the South of more than 100,000 that Bryan carried was Denver, Colorado.

1896 Electoral vote results

=== Realignment of 1896 ===
The 1896 presidential election was a realigning election, in which McKinley's view of a stronger central government building American industry through protective tariffs and a dollar based on gold triumphed. The voting patterns established then displaced the near-deadlock the major parties had seen since the Civil War in the Third Party System. The new Republican dominance began the Fourth Party System that ended in 1932, another realigning election with the ascent of Franklin Roosevelt and the New Deal coalition. Phillips argues that McKinley was probably the only Republican who could have defeated Bryan—he concludes that Eastern candidates would have done badly against the Illinois-born Bryan in the crucial Midwest. While Bryan was popular among rural voters, "McKinley appealed to a very different industrialized, urbanized America."

== Presidency (1897–1901) ==
=== Inauguration and appointments ===
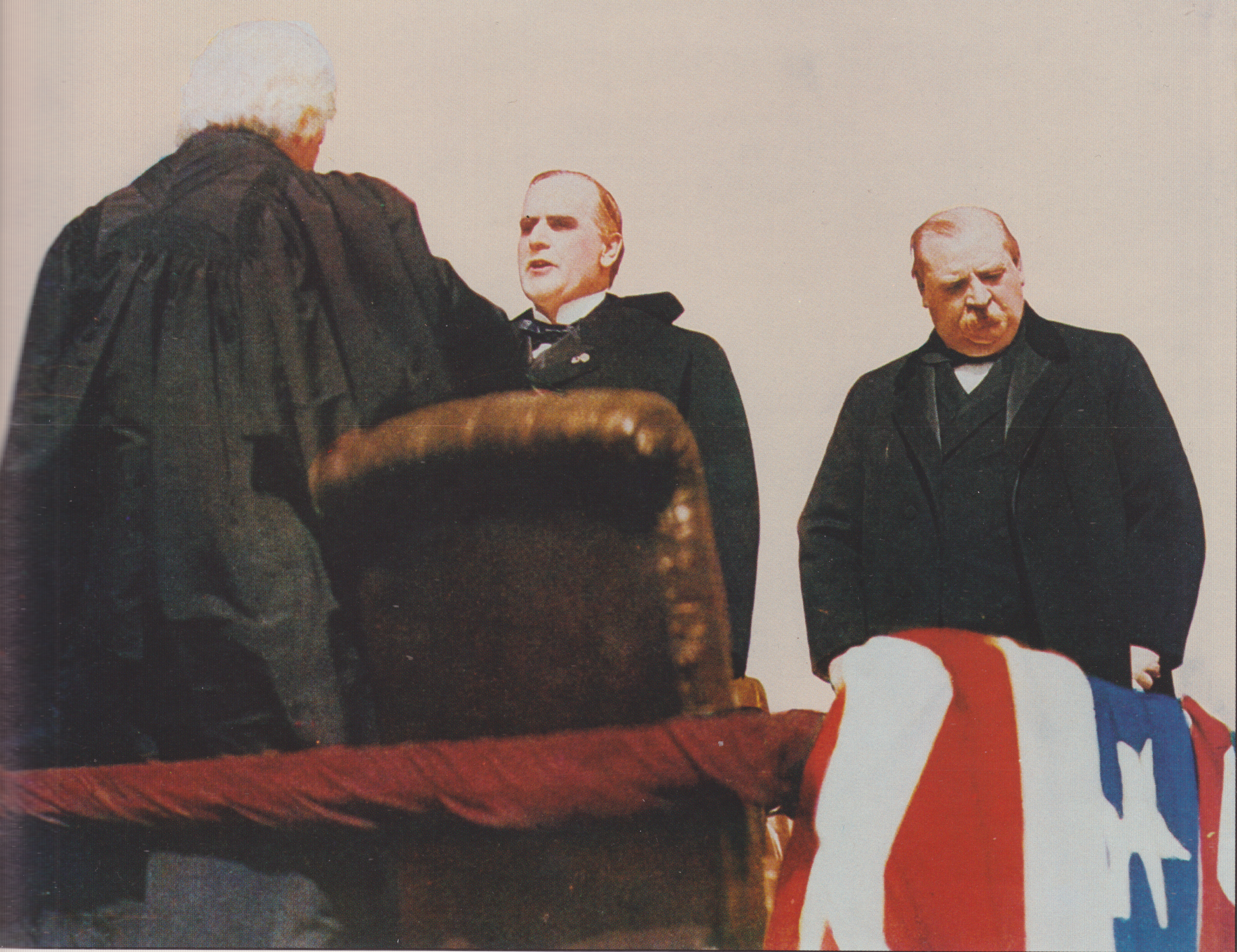
Chief Justice Melville Fuller swears in William McKinley as president; outgoing President Grover Cleveland at right

McKinley was sworn in as president on March 4, 1897, as his wife and mother looked on. He gave a lengthy inaugural address; he urged tariff reform and said the currency issue would have to await tariff legislation. He warned against foreign interventions: "We want no wars of conquest. We must avoid the temptation of territorial aggression."

McKinley's most controversial Cabinet appointment was that of John Sherman as Secretary of State. Sherman had an outstanding reputation, but old age was fast reducing his abilities. McKinley needed Hanna appointed to the Senate, so Sherman was moved up. Sherman's mental faculties were decaying even in 1896; this was widely spoken of in political circles, but McKinley did not believe the rumors. Nevertheless, McKinley sent his cousin, William McKinley Osborne, to have dinner with the 73-year-old senator; he reported back that Sherman seemed as lucid as ever. McKinley wrote once the appointment was announced, "the stories regarding Senator Sherman's 'mental decay' are without foundation ... When I saw him last I was convinced both of his perfect health, physically and mentally, and that the prospects of life were remarkably good."

Maine Representative Nelson Dingley Jr. was McKinley's choice for Secretary of the Treasury; he declined it, preferring to remain chairman of the Ways and Means Committee. Charles Dawes, who had been Hanna's lieutenant in Chicago during the campaign, was considered for the Treasury post but by some accounts Dawes considered himself too young. Dawes eventually became Comptroller of the Currency; he recorded in his published diary that he had strongly urged McKinley to appoint as secretary the successful candidate, Lyman J. Gage, president of the First National Bank of Chicago and a Gold Democrat. The Navy Department was offered to former Massachusetts Congressman John Davis Long, an old friend from the House, on January 30, 1897. McKinley was initially inclined to allow Long to choose his own assistant, but there was considerable pressure on him to appoint Theodore Roosevelt, head of the New York City Police Commission and a published naval historian. McKinley was reluctant, telling one Roosevelt booster, "I want peace and I am told that your friend Theodore is always getting into rows with everybody." Nevertheless, he made the appointment.

In addition to Sherman, McKinley made one other ill-advised Cabinet appointment, that of Secretary of War, which fell to Russell A. Alger, former general and Michigan governor. Competent enough in peacetime, Alger proved inadequate once the conflict with Spain began. With the War Department plagued by scandal, Alger resigned at McKinley's request in mid-1899. Vice President Hobart, as was customary at the time, was not invited to Cabinet meetings, but proved a valuable adviser both for McKinley and for his Cabinet members. The wealthy Vice President leased a residence close to the White House; the two families visited each other without formality, and the Vice President's wife, Jennie Tuttle Hobart, sometimes substituted as Executive Mansion hostess when Ida McKinley was unwell. For most of McKinley's administration, George B. Cortelyou served as his personal secretary. Cortelyou, who served in three Cabinet positions under Theodore Roosevelt, became a combination press secretary and chief of staff to McKinley.

=== Cuba crisis and war with Spain ===
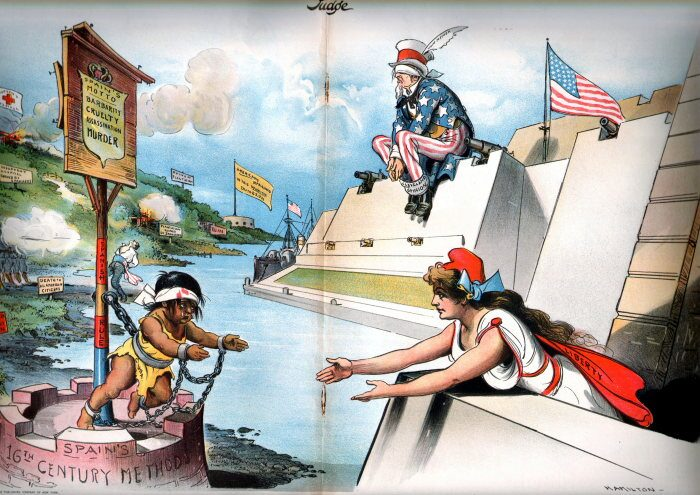
Editorial cartoon promoting intervention in Cuba. Columbia (the American people) reaches out to help oppressed Cuba in 1897 while Uncle Sam (the U.S. government) is blind to the crisis and will not use its powerful guns to help. Judge magazine, February 6, 1897.

For decades, rebels in Cuba had waged an intermittent campaign for freedom from Spanish colonial rule. By 1895, the conflict had expanded to a war for Cuban independence. As war engulfed the island, Spanish reprisals against the rebels grew ever harsher. American public opinion favored the rebels, and McKinley shared in their outrage against Spanish policies. However while public opinion called for war to liberate Cuba, McKinley favored a peaceful approach, hoping that through negotiation, Spain might be convinced to grant Cuba independence, or at least to allow the Cubans some measure of autonomy. The United States and Spain began negotiations on the subject in 1897, but it became clear that Spain would never concede Cuban independence, while the rebels (and their American supporters) would never settle for anything less.

In January 1898, Spain promised some concessions to the rebels, but when American consul Fitzhugh Lee reported riots in Havana, McKinley agreed to send the battleship USS Maine. On February 15, the Maine exploded and sank with 266 men killed. Public attention focused on the crisis and the consensus was that regardless of who set the bomb, Spain had lost control over Cuba. McKinley insisted that a court of inquiry first determine whether the explosion was accidental. Negotiations with Spain continued as the court considered the evidence, but on March 20, the court ruled that the Maine was blown up by an underwater mine. As pressure for war mounted in Congress, McKinley continued to negotiate for Cuban independence. Spain refused McKinley's proposals, and on April 11, McKinley turned the matter over to Congress. He did not ask for war, but Congress made the decision and declared war on April 20, with the addition of the Teller Amendment, which disavowed any intention of annexing Cuba. Historian Nick Kapur argues that McKinley's actions were based on his values of arbitrationism, pacifism, humanitarianism, and manly self-restraint, and not on external pressures.

The expansion of the telegraph and the development of the telephone gave McKinley greater control over the day-to-day management of the war than previous presidents had enjoyed, and he used the new technologies to direct the army's and navy's movements as far as he was able. McKinley found Alger inadequate as Secretary of War, and did not get along with the Army's commanding general, Nelson A. Miles. Bypassing them, he looked for strategic advice first from Miles's predecessor, General John Schofield, and later from Adjutant General Henry Clarke Corbin. The war led to a change in McKinley's cabinet, as the president accepted Sherman's resignation as Secretary of State. William R. Day agreed to serve as secretary until the war's end.

Within a fortnight, the navy had its first victory when Commodore George Dewey destroyed the Spanish fleet at the Battle of Manila Bay in the Philippines. Dewey's overwhelming victory expanded the scope of the war from one centered in the Caribbean to one that would determine the fate of all of Spain's Pacific colonies. The next month, McKinley increased the number of troops sent to the Philippines and granted the force's commander, Major General Wesley Merritt, the power to set up legal systems and raise taxes—necessities for a long occupation. By the time the troops arrived in the Philippines at the end of June 1898, McKinley had decided that Spain would be required to surrender the archipelago to the United States. He professed to be open to all views on the subject; however, he believed that as the war progressed, the public would come to demand retention of the islands as a prize of war.

Meanwhile, in the Caribbean theater, a large force of regulars and volunteers gathered near Tampa, Florida, for an invasion of Cuba. After lengthy delays, the army, led by Major General William Rufus Shafter, on June 22, landed near Santiago de Cuba. Shafter's army engaged the Spanish forces on July 2 in the Battle of San Juan Hill. In an intense day-long battle, the American force was victorious, although both sides suffered heavy casualties. The next day, Spain's Caribbean squadron, which had been sheltering in Santiago's harbor, broke for the open sea and was destroyed by the North Atlantic Squadron in the largest naval battle of the war. Shafter laid siege to the city of Santiago, which surrendered on July 17, placing Cuba under effective American control. McKinley and Miles also ordered an invasion of Puerto Rico, which met little resistance when it landed in July. The distance from Spain and the destruction of the Spanish navy made resupply impossible, and the Spanish government began to look for a way to end the war.

=== Peace and territorial gain ===
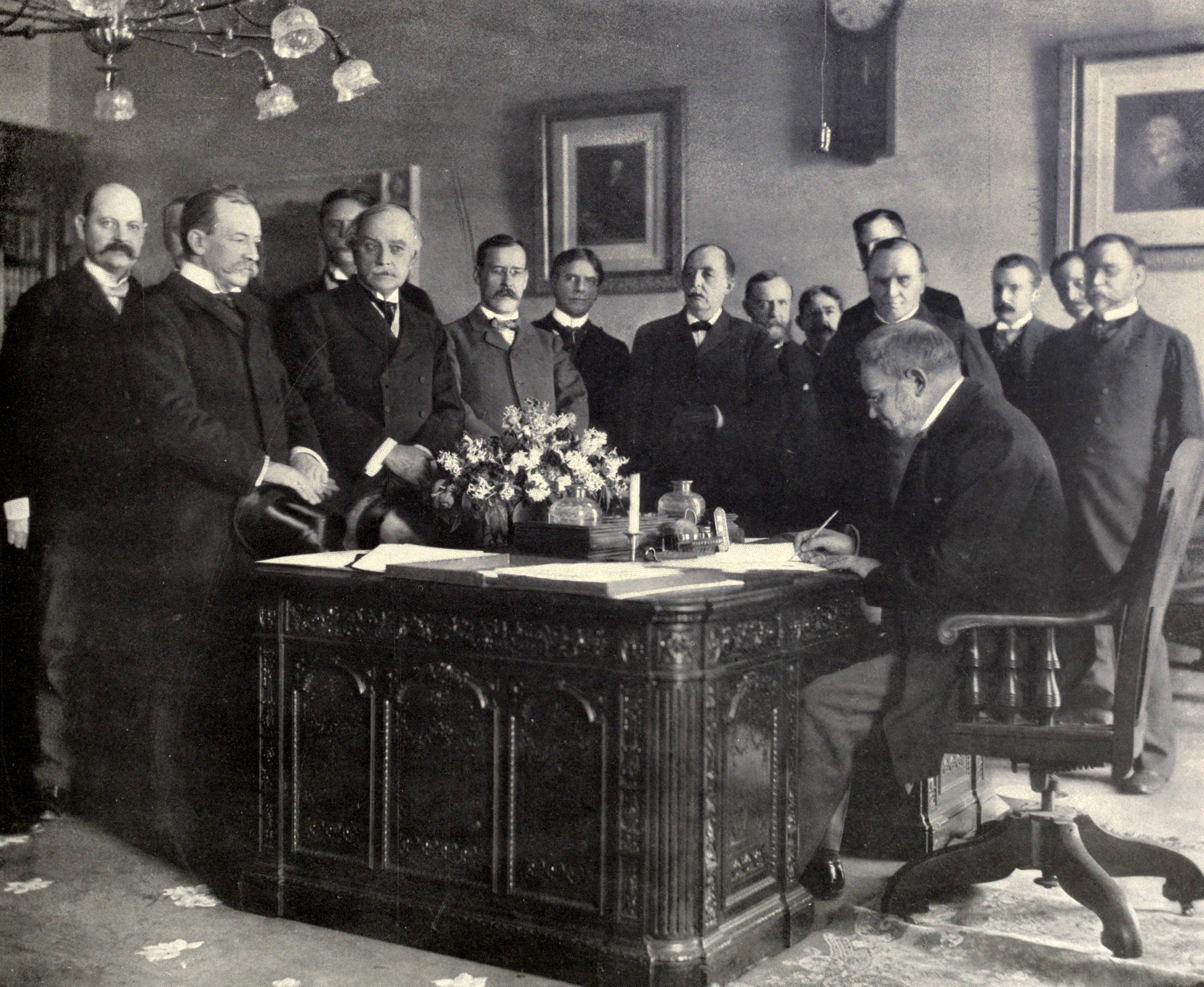
Signing of the Treaty of Paris

McKinley's cabinet agreed with him that Spain must leave Cuba and Puerto Rico, but they disagreed on the Philippines, with some wishing to annex the entire archipelago and some wishing only to retain a naval base in the area. Although public sentiment seemed to favor annexation of the Philippines, several prominent political leaders—including Bryan and Cleveland and the newly formed American Anti-Imperialist League—made their opposition known.

McKinley proposed to open negotiations with Spain on the basis of Cuban liberation and Puerto Rican annexation, with the final status of the Philippines subject to further discussion. He stood firmly in that demand even as the military situation in Cuba began to deteriorate when the American army was struck with yellow fever. Spain ultimately agreed to a ceasefire on those terms on August 12, and treaty negotiations began in Paris in September 1898. The talks continued until December 18, when the Treaty of Paris was signed. The United States acquired Puerto Rico and the Philippines as well as the island of Guam, and Spain relinquished its claims to Cuba; in exchange, the United States agreed to pay Spain $20 million (equivalent to $774 million in 2025). McKinley had difficulty convincing the Senate to approve the treaty by the requisite two-thirds vote, but his lobbying, and that of Vice President Hobart, eventually succeeded, as the Senate voted in favor on February 6, 1899, 57 to 27.

==== Hawaii ====
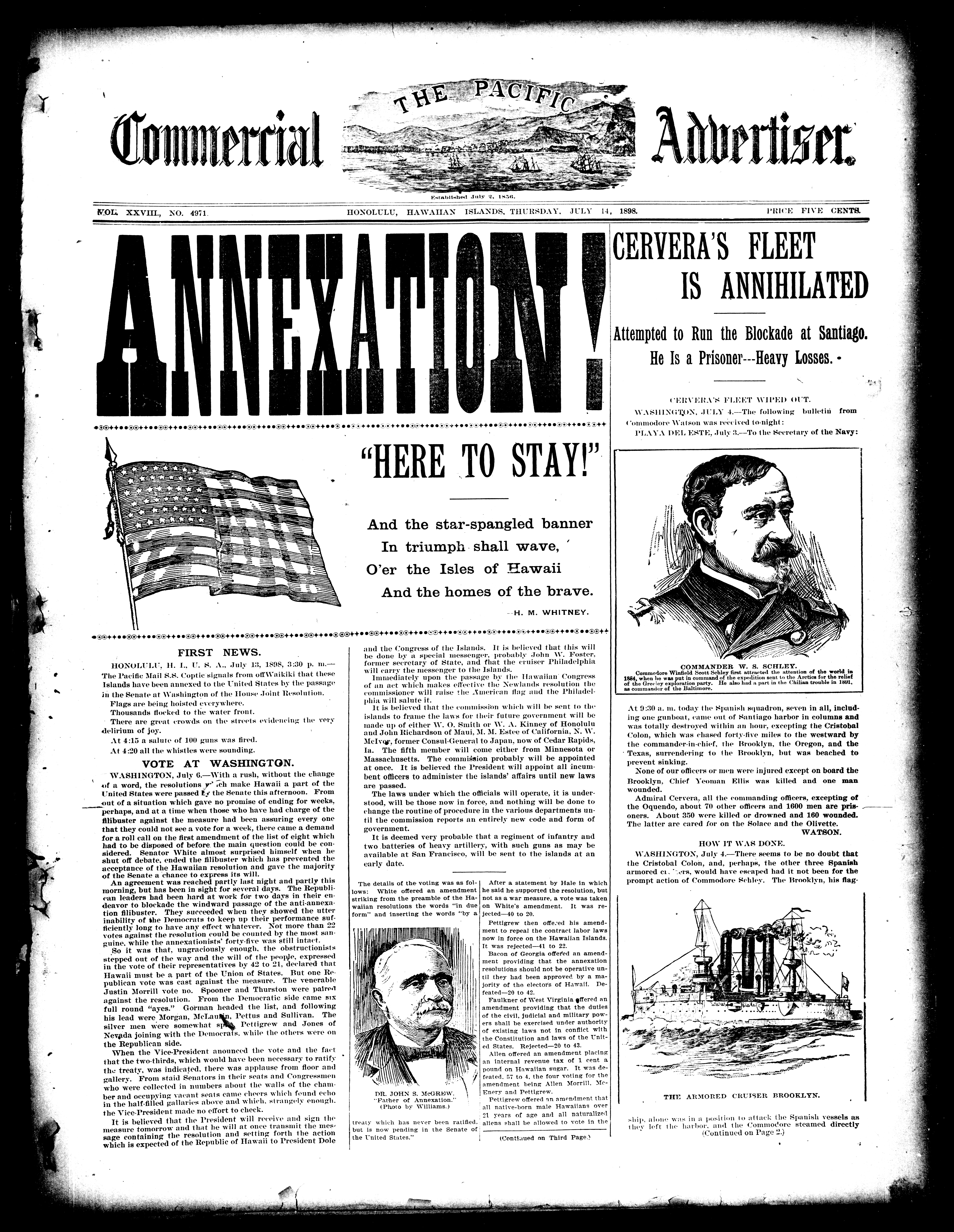
Annexation of the Republic of Hawaii in 1898

During the war, McKinley also pursued the annexation of the Republic of Hawaii. The new republic, dominated by business interests, had overthrown the Queen in 1893 when she attempted to restore the powers of the monarchy by nullifying the bayonet constitution. There was strong American support for annexation, and the need for Pacific bases in wartime became clear after the Battle of Manila. McKinley came to office as a supporter of annexation, and lobbied Congress to act, warning that to do nothing would invite a royalist counter-revolution or a Japanese takeover. Foreseeing difficulty in getting two-thirds of the Senate to approve a treaty of annexation, McKinley instead supported the effort of Democratic Representative Francis G. Newlands of Nevada to accomplish the result by joint resolution of both houses of Congress. The resulting Newlands Resolution passed both houses by wide margins, and McKinley signed it into law on July 8, 1898. McKinley biographer H. Wayne Morgan notes, "McKinley was the guiding spirit behind the annexation of Hawaii, showing ... a firmness in pursuing it"; the president told Cortelyou, "We need Hawaii just as much and a good deal more than we did California. It is manifest destiny."

=== Expanding influence overseas ===
==== Open door in China ====
Even before peace negotiations began with Spain, McKinley asked Congress to set up a commission to examine trade opportunities in Asia and espoused an "Open Door Policy", in which all nations would freely trade with China and none would seek to violate that nation's territorial integrity.

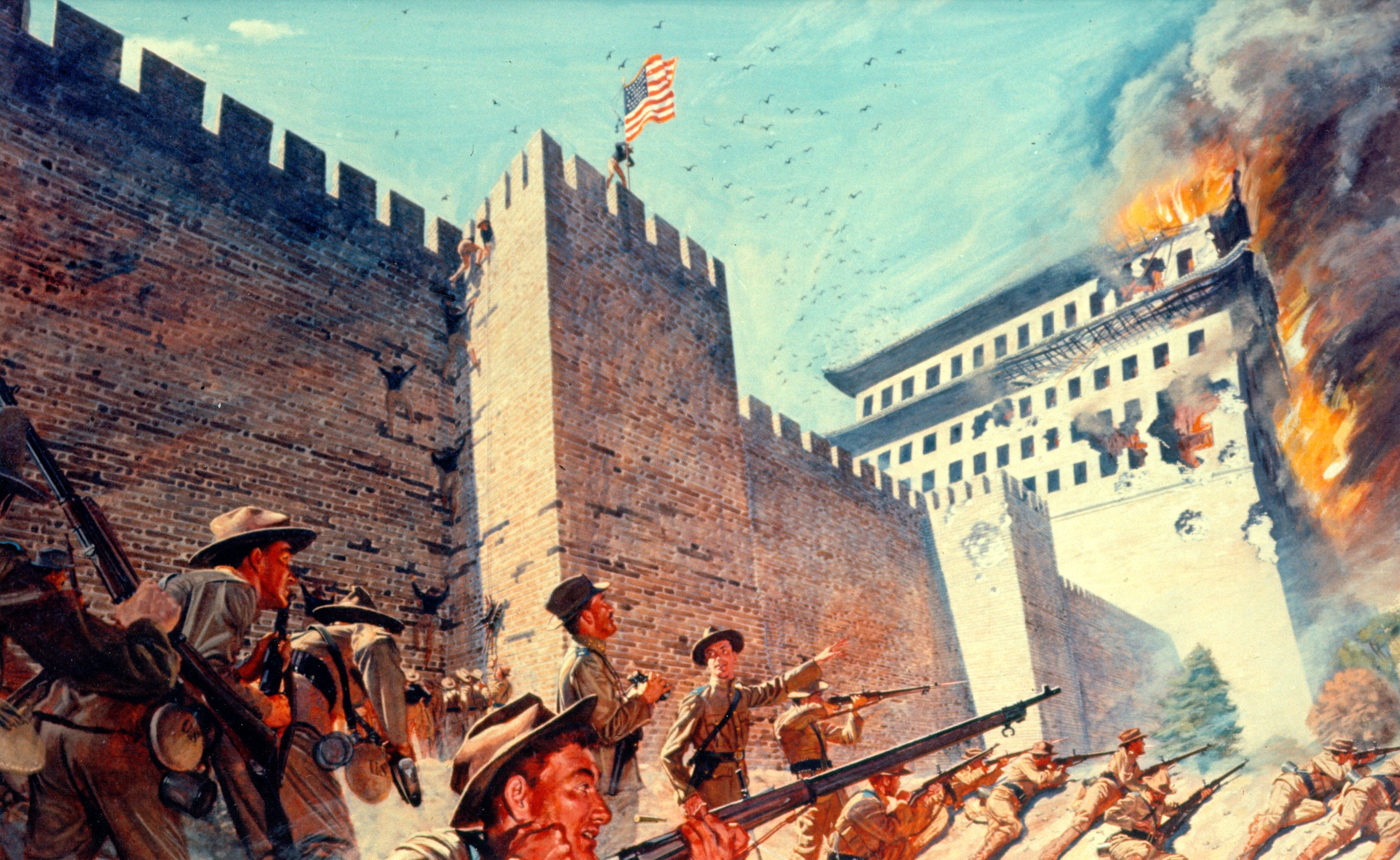
American soldiers scale the walls of Beijing to relieve the siege of the International Legations, August 1900

American missionaries were threatened with death when the Boxer Rebellion menaced foreigners in China. Americans and other westerners in Peking were besieged and, in cooperation with other western powers, McKinley ordered 5000 troops to the city in June 1900 in the China Relief Expedition. The westerners were rescued the next month, but several Congressional Democrats objected to McKinley dispatching troops without consulting the legislature. McKinley's actions set a precedent that led to most of his successors exerting similar independent control over the military. After the rebellion ended, the United States reaffirmed its commitment to the Open Door policy, which became the basis of American policy toward China.

==== Panama canal ====
Closer to home, McKinley and Hay engaged in negotiations with Britain over the possible construction of a canal across Central America. The Clayton–Bulwer Treaty, which the two nations signed in 1850, prohibited either from establishing exclusive control over a canal there. The war had exposed the difficulty of maintaining a two-ocean navy when the Navy had to sail all the way around South America to reach the Pacific. Now, with American business and military interests even more involved in Asia, a canal seemed more essential than ever, and McKinley pressed for a renegotiation of the treaty. Hay and the British ambassador, Julian Pauncefote, agreed that the United States could control a future canal, provided that it was open to all shipping and not fortified. McKinley was satisfied with the terms, but the Senate rejected them, demanding that the United States be allowed to fortify the canal. Hay was embarrassed by the rebuff and offered his resignation, but McKinley refused it and ordered him to continue negotiations to achieve the Senate's demands. He was successful, and a new treaty was drafted and approved, but not before McKinley's assassination in 1901. Construction of the Panama Canal was begun during Roosevelt's administration.

=== Tariffs and bimetallism ===
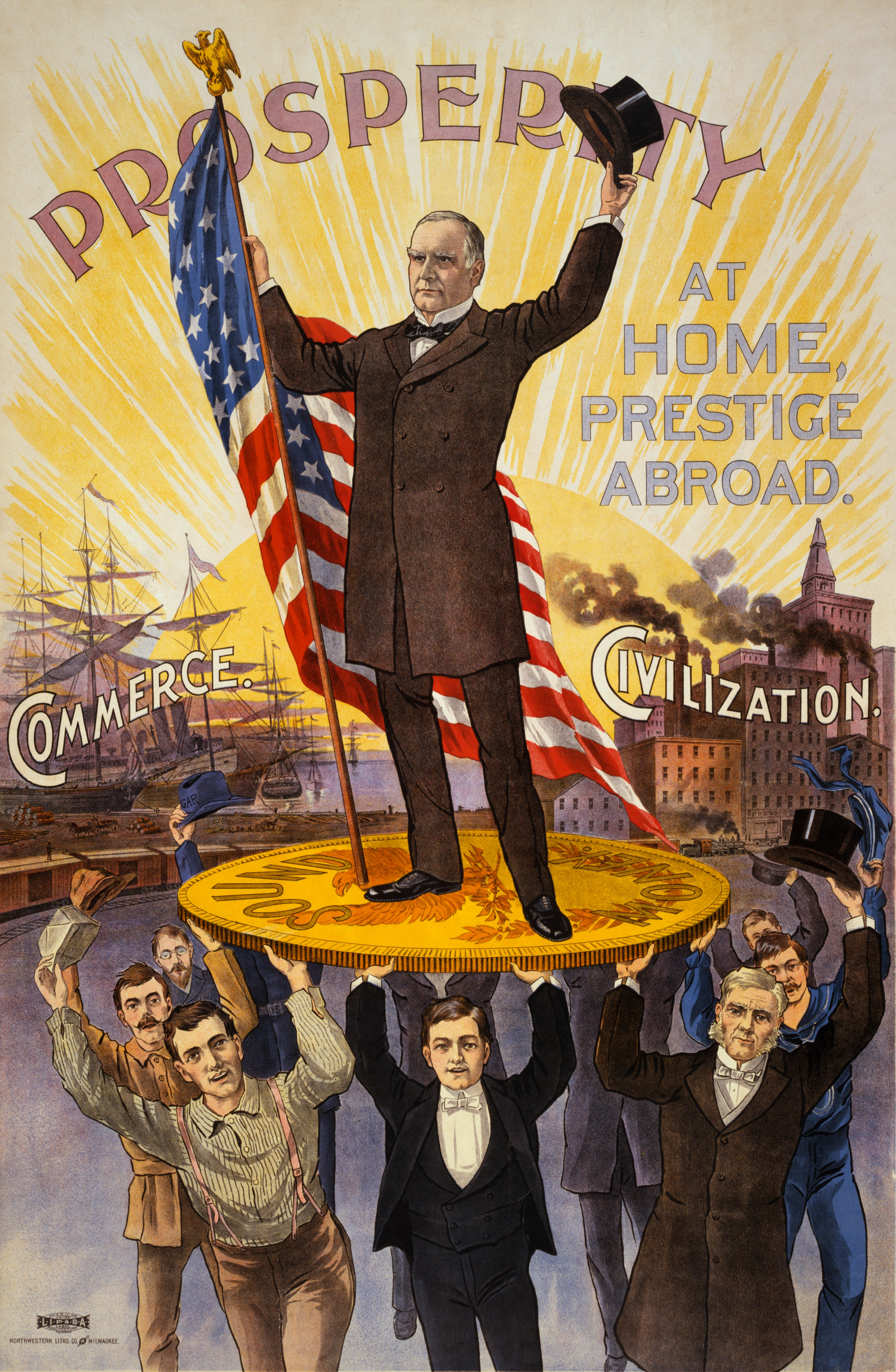
1900 reelection poster with the theme that McKinley has returned prosperity to America

McKinley had built his reputation in Congress on high tariffs, promising protection for American business and well-paid U.S. factory workers. With the Republicans in control of Congress, Ways and Means chairman Dingley introduced the Dingley Act, which would raise tariff rates on wool, sugar, and luxury goods. Congress passed the legislation with McKinley's support, and he signed it into law on July 24, 1897, less than five months into his presidency.

American negotiators soon concluded a reciprocity treaty with France, and the two nations approached Britain to gauge British enthusiasm for bimetallism. Prime Minister Lord Salisbury and his government showed some interest in the idea and told American envoy Edward O. Wolcott that he would be amenable to reopening the mints in India to silver coinage if the Viceroy's Executive Council there agreed. News of a possible departure from the gold standard stirred up immediate opposition from its partisans, and misgivings by the Indian administration led Britain to reject the proposal. With the international effort a failure, McKinley turned away from silver coinage and embraced the gold standard. Even without the agreement, agitation for free silver eased as prosperity began to return to the United States and gold from recent strikes in the Yukon and Australia increased the monetary supply even without silver coinage. In the absence of international agreement, McKinley favored legislation to formally affirm the gold standard, but was initially deterred by the silver strength in the Senate. By 1900, with another campaign ahead and good economic conditions, McKinley urged Congress to pass such a law, and signed the Gold Standard Act on March 14, 1900, using a gold pen to do so.

=== Civil rights ===
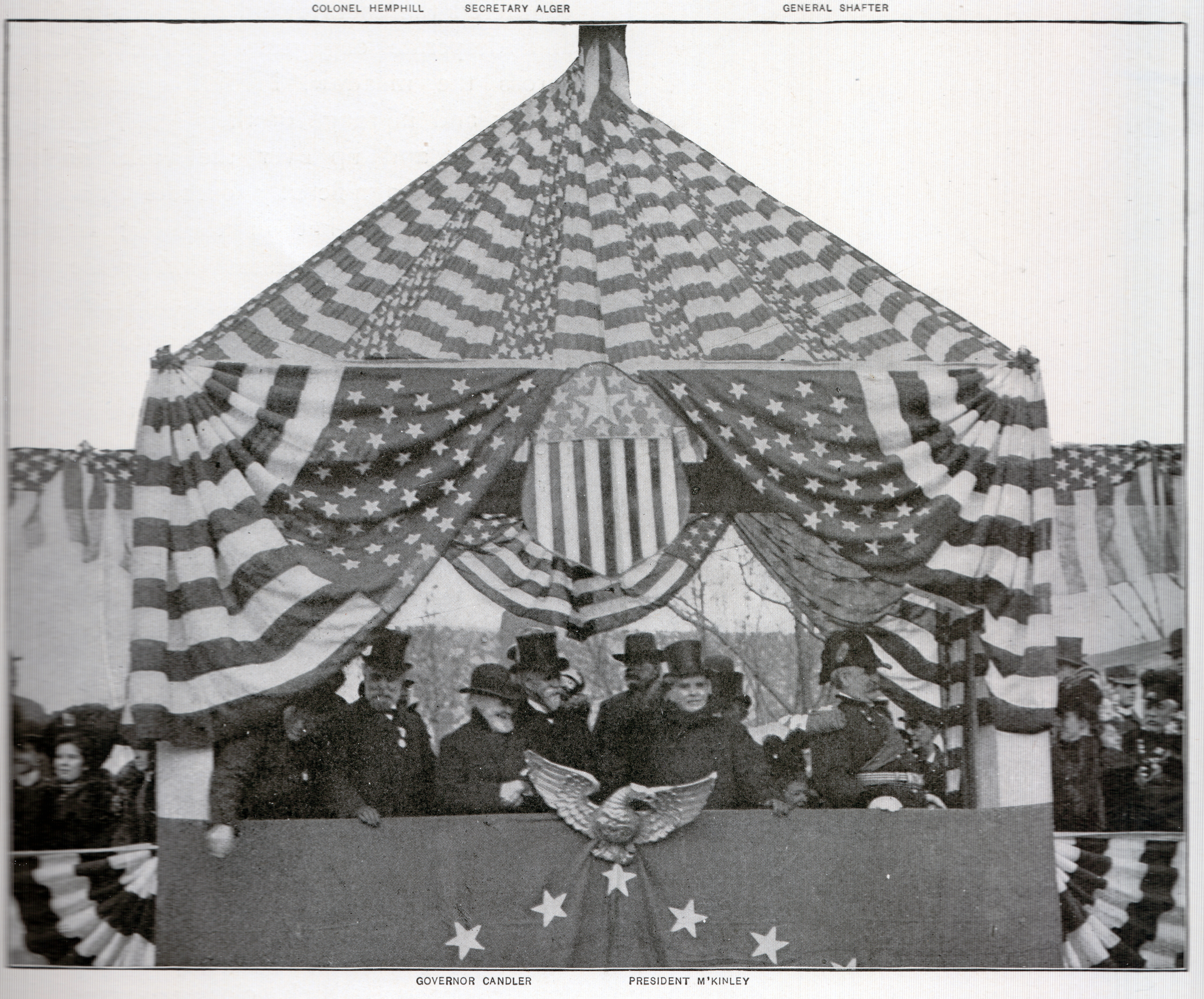
McKinley, (right of center) flanked by Georgia Governor Allen D. Candler (front row to McKinley's right) and Gen. William Rufus Shafter, reviewing the Atlanta Peace Jubilee parade, December 15, 1898

In the wake of McKinley's election in 1896, black people were hopeful of progress towards equality. McKinley had spoken out against lynching while governor, and most black people who could still vote supported him in 1896. But McKinley's priority was to end sectionalism, and they were disappointed by his policies and appointments. Although McKinley made some appointments of black people to low-level government posts, and received some praise for that, the appointments were less than they had received under previous Republican administrations.

The McKinley administration's response to racial violence was minimal, causing him to lose black support. When black postmasters at Hogansville, Georgia, in 1897, and at Lake City, South Carolina, in 1898, were assaulted, McKinley issued no statement of condemnation. Although black leaders criticized McKinley for inaction, supporters responded that the president could do little to intervene. Critics replied that he could at least publicly condemn such events, as Harrison had.

When a group of white supremacists violently overthrew the duly elected government of Wilmington, North Carolina, on November 10, 1898, in an event that came to be recognized as the Wilmington massacre, McKinley refused black leaders' requests to send in federal marshals or troops to protect black citizens and ignored city residents' appeals for help to recover from the widespread destruction of the predominantly black neighborhood of Brooklyn.

According to historian Clarence A. Bacote, "Before the Spanish–American War, the Negroes, in spite of some mistakes, regarded McKinley as the best friend they ever had." Under pressure from black leaders, McKinley required the War Department to commission black officers above the rank of lieutenant. McKinley toured the South in late 1898, promoting sectional reconciliation. He visited Tuskegee Institute and the famous black educator Booker T. Washington. He also visited Confederate memorials. In his tour of the South, McKinley did not mention the racial tensions or violence. He was received rapturously by Southern whites, but many blacks, excluded from official welcoming committees, felt alienated by the president's words and actions. Gould concluded regarding race, "McKinley lacked the vision to transcend the biases of his day and to point toward a better future for all Americans".

=== 1900 election ===
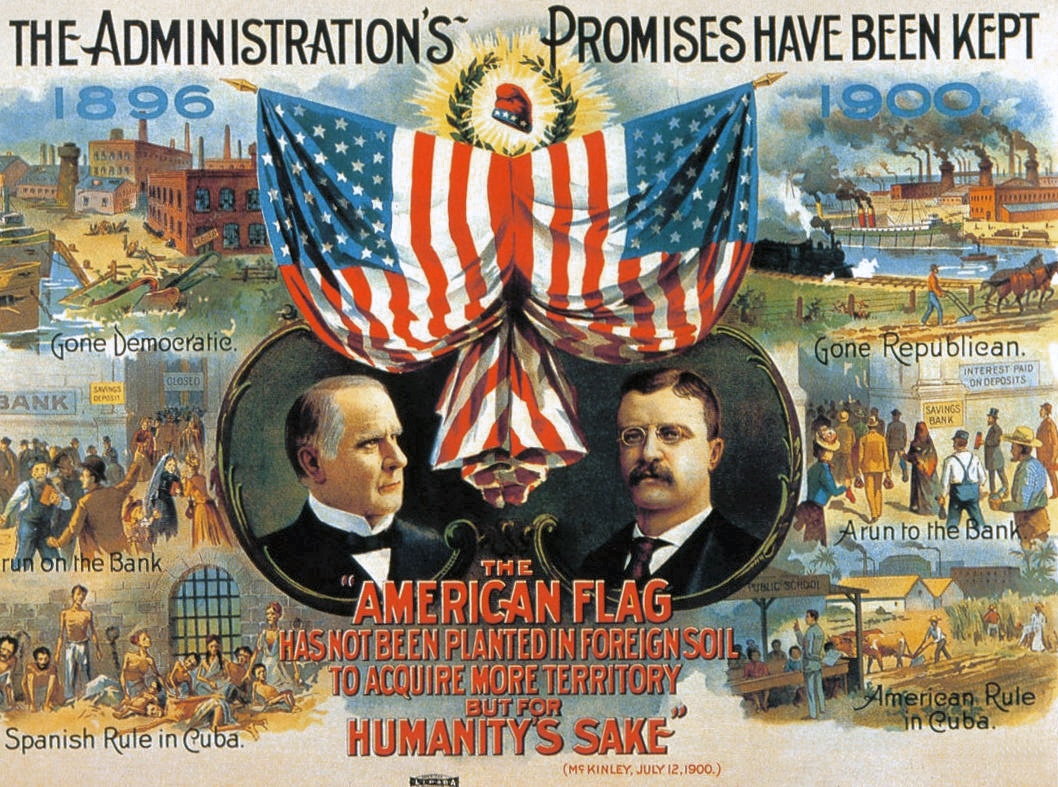
McKinley ran on his record of prosperity and victory in 1900, winning easy re-election over William Jennings Bryan.

Republicans were generally successful in state and local elections around the country in 1899, and McKinley was optimistic about his chances of reelection in 1900. His popularity in his first term assured him of renomination for a second. The only question about the Republican ticket concerned the vice-presidential nomination; Hobart had died in late 1899. McKinley initially favored Elihu Root, who had succeeded Alger as Secretary of War, but decided that Root was doing too good a job at the War Department to move him. He considered other prominent candidates, including Allison and Cornelius Newton Bliss, but none were as popular as the Republican party's rising star, Theodore Roosevelt. After a stint as Assistant Secretary of the Navy, Roosevelt had resigned and raised a cavalry regiment; they fought bravely in Cuba, and Roosevelt returned home covered in glory. Elected governor of New York on a reform platform in 1898, Roosevelt had his eye on the presidency. Many supporters recommended him to McKinley for the second spot on the ticket, and Roosevelt believed it would be an excellent stepping stone to the presidency in 1904. McKinley remained uncommitted in public, but Hanna firmly opposed the idea. The Ohio senator considered the New Yorker overly impulsive; his stance was undermined by the efforts of political boss and New York Senator Thomas C. Platt, who, disliking Roosevelt's reform agenda, sought to sideline the governor by making him vice president.

When the Republican convention began in Philadelphia that June, no vice-presidential candidate had overwhelming support, but Roosevelt had the broadest range of support from around the country. McKinley affirmed that the choice belonged to the convention, not to him. On June 21, McKinley was unanimously renominated and, with Hanna's reluctant acquiescence, Roosevelt was nominated for vice president on the first ballot. The Democratic convention convened the next month in Kansas City and nominated Bryan, setting up a rematch of the 1896 contest.

The candidates were the same, but the issues had shifted: free silver was still a question that animated many voters, but Republicans focused on victory in war and prosperity at home as issues they believed favored their party. Democrats knew the war had been popular, even if the imperialism issue was less sure, so they focused on the issue of trusts and corporate power, painting McKinley as the servant of capital and big business. As in 1896, Bryan embarked on a speaking tour around the country while McKinley stayed at home, this time making only one speech, to accept his nomination. Roosevelt emerged as the campaign's primary speaker and Hanna helped the cause by working to settle a coal miners strike in Pennsylvania. Bryan's campaigning failed to excite the voters as it had in 1896, and McKinley never doubted that he would be reelected. On November 6, 1900, he was proven correct, winning the largest victory for any Republican since 1872. Bryan carried only four states outside the solid South, and McKinley even won Bryan's home state of Nebraska.

=== Second term ===
McKinley's second inauguration, filmed by Thomas Edison. This was the first filmed presidential oath of office in U.S. history.

Soon after his second inauguration on March 4, 1901, William and Ida McKinley undertook a six-week tour of the nation. Traveling mostly by rail, the McKinleys were to travel through the South to the Southwest, and then up the Pacific coast and east again, to conclude with a visit on June 13, 1901, to the Pan-American Exposition in Buffalo, New York. However, the first lady fell ill in California, causing her husband to limit his public events and cancel a series of speeches he had planned to give urging trade reciprocity. He also postponed the visit to the fair until September, planning a month in Washington and two in Canton before the Buffalo visit.

== Assassination ==
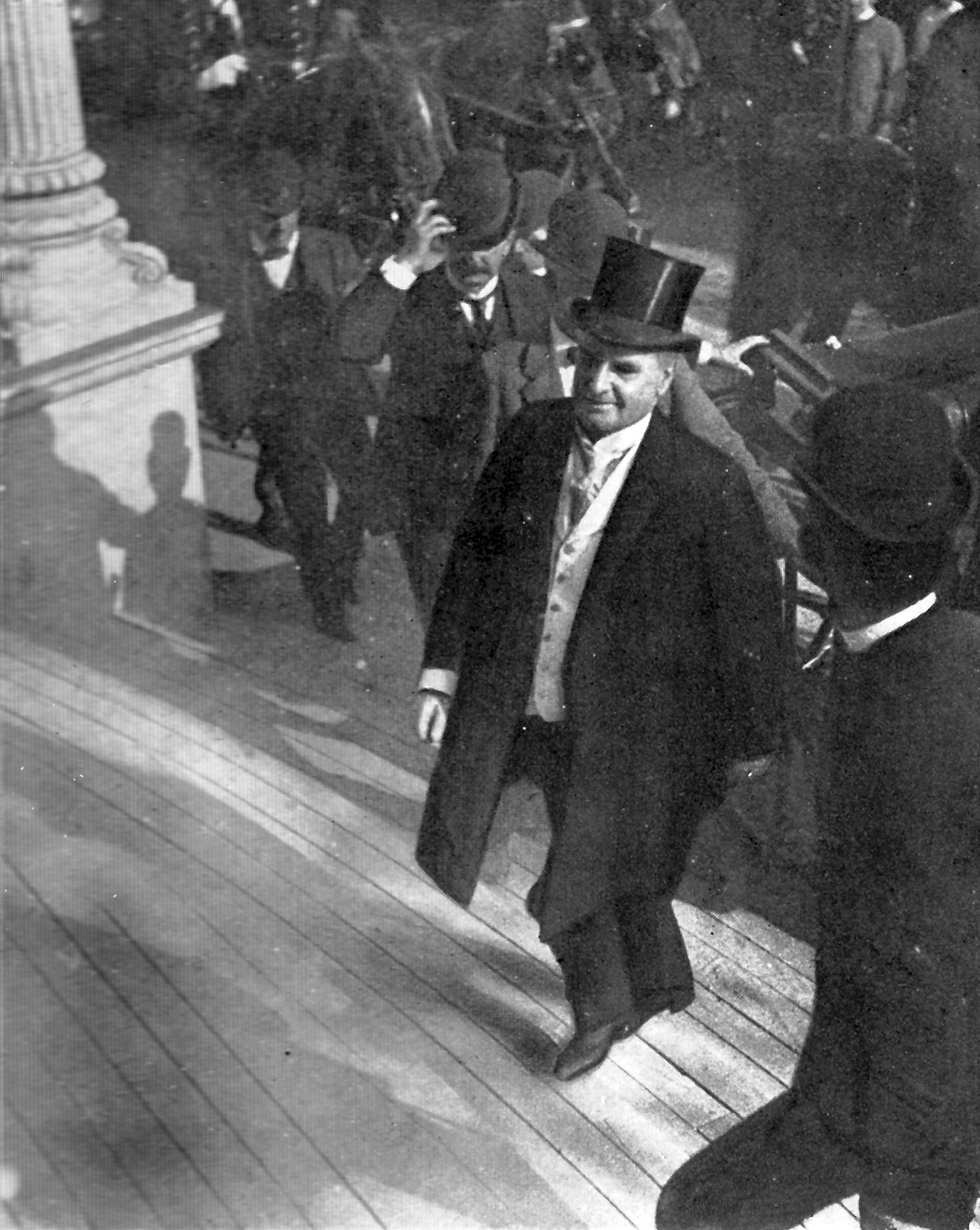
McKinley entering the Temple of Music on September 6, 1901, shortly before the shots were fired

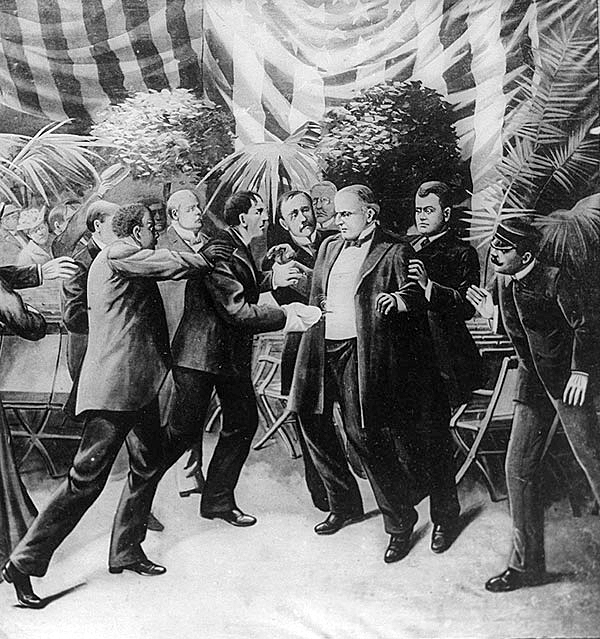
Artist's conception of the shooting of McKinley

Although McKinley enjoyed meeting the public, Cortelyou was concerned with his security because of recent assassinations by anarchists in Europe, such as the assassination of King Umberto I of Italy the previous year. Twice he tried to remove a public reception from the president's rescheduled visit to the exposition. McKinley refused, and Cortelyou arranged for additional security for the trip. On September 5, McKinley delivered his address at the fairgrounds before a crowd of 50,000. In his final speech, McKinley urged reciprocity treaties with other nations to assure American manufacturers access to foreign markets. He intended the speech as a keynote to his plans for a second term.

A man in the crowd named Leon Czolgosz hoped to assassinate McKinley. After hearing a speech by anarchist Emma Goldman in Cleveland, Czolgosz had decided to take action that he believed would advance the cause. He had managed to get close to the presidential podium, but did not fire, uncertain of hitting his target. After his failure to get close enough on September 5, Czolgosz waited until the next day at the Temple of Music on the exposition grounds, where the president was to meet the public. Czolgosz concealed his gun in a handkerchief and, when he reached the head of the line, shot McKinley twice in the abdomen at close range.

McKinley urged his aides to break the news gently to Ida, and to call off the mob that had set upon Czolgosz, a request that may have saved his assassin's life. McKinley was taken to the exposition aid station, where the doctor was unable to find the second bullet. Although a primitive X-ray machine was being exhibited on the exposition grounds, it was not used. McKinley was taken to the home of John G. Milburn, president of the Pan-American Exposition Company.

In the days after the shooting, McKinley appeared to improve and doctors issued increasingly optimistic bulletins. Members of the Cabinet, who had rushed to Buffalo on hearing the news, dispersed, and Vice President Roosevelt departed on a camping trip to the Adirondacks.

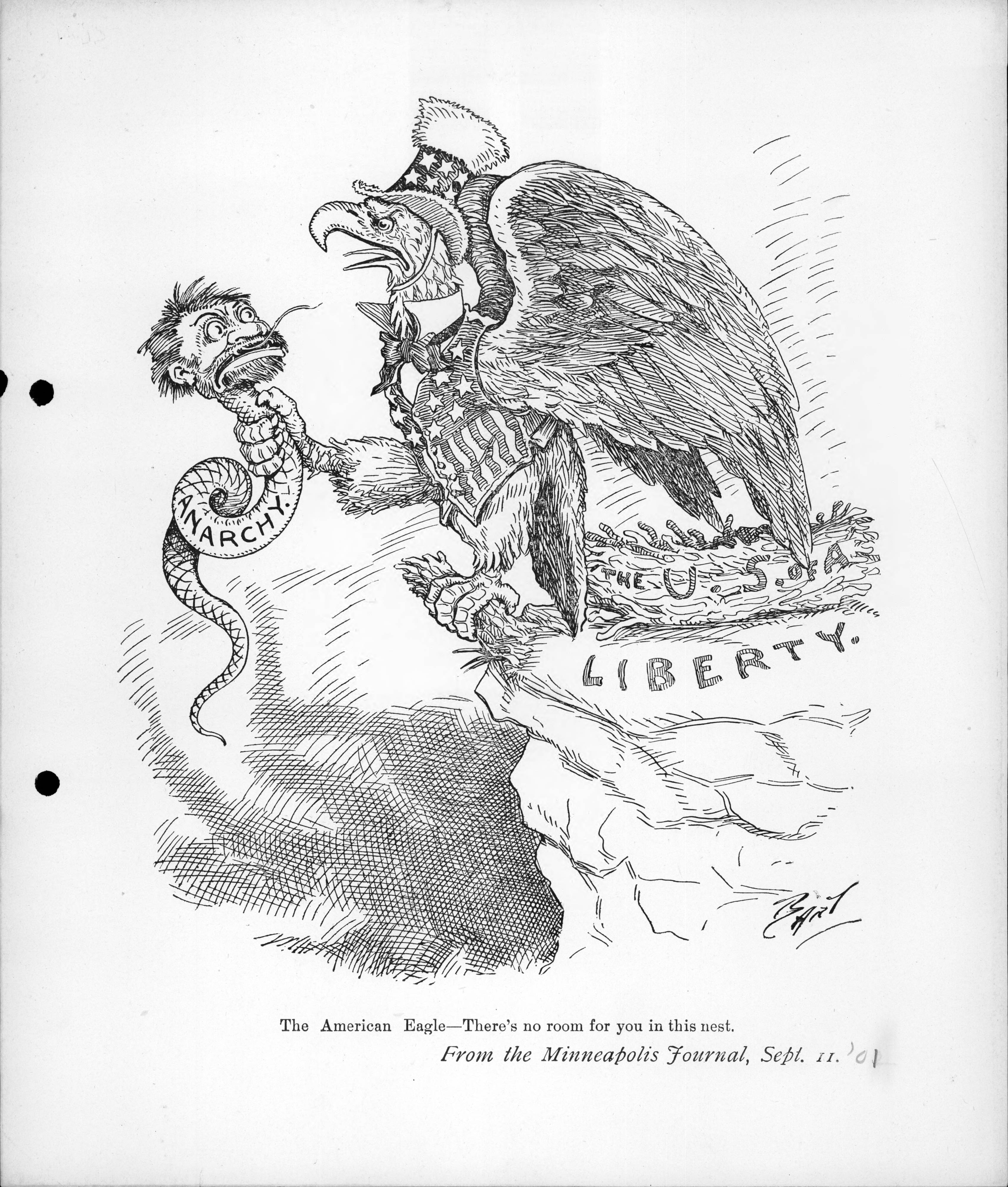
A September 11, 1901, political cartoon responding to the anarchist assassination attempt.

Leech wrote:

It is difficult to interpret the optimism with which the President's physicians looked for his recovery. There was obviously the most serious danger that his wounds would become septic. In that case, he would almost certainly die, since drugs to control infection did not exist ... [Prominent New York City physician] Dr. McBurney was by far the worst offender in showering sanguine assurances on the correspondents. As the only big-city surgeon on the case, he was eagerly questioned and quoted, and his rosy prognostications largely contributed to the delusion of the American public.

On the morning of September 13, McKinley's condition deteriorated. Specialists were summoned; although at first some doctors hoped that McKinley might survive with a weakened heart, by afternoon they knew that the case was hopeless. Unknown to the doctors, gangrene was growing on the walls of McKinley's stomach and slowly poisoning his blood. McKinley drifted in and out of consciousness all day, but when awake he was a model patient. By evening, McKinley too knew he was dying, saying: "It is useless, gentlemen. I think we ought to have prayer." Relatives and friends gathered around the deathbed. The first lady sobbed over him, saying, "I want to go, too. I want to go, too." Her husband replied, "We are all going, we are all going. God's will be done, not ours", and with final strength put an arm around her. He may also have sung part of his favorite hymn, "Nearer, My God, to Thee", although other accounts have the first lady singing it softly to him.

At 2:15 a.m. on September 14, 1901, McKinley died. Roosevelt rushed back to Buffalo and took the oath of office as president. Czolgosz, put on trial for murder nine days after McKinley's death, was found guilty, sentenced to death on September 26, and executed by electric chair on October 29, 1901.

== Funeral, memorials, and legacy ==
=== Funeral and resting place ===
McKinley's funeral on September 17, 1901.

According to Gould, "The nation experienced a wave of genuine grief at the news of McKinley's passing." The stock market, faced with sudden uncertainty, suffered a steep decline that went nearly unnoticed in the mourning. The nation focused its attention on the casket that first lay in the East Room of the Executive Mansion and then lay in state in the Capitol before being transported to Canton by train. Approximately 100,000 people passed by the open casket in the Capitol Rotunda, many having waited hours in the rain. In Canton, an equal number did the same at the Stark County Courthouse on September 18. The next day, a funeral service was held at the First Methodist Church. The casket was sealed and taken to the McKinley house, where relatives paid their final respects. It was then transported to the receiving vault at West Lawn Cemetery in Canton to await the construction of the memorial to McKinley already being planned.

McKinley's casket being transported to Canton, Ohio to be buried on September 19, 1901.

There was a widespread expectation that Ida McKinley would not long survive her husband; one family friend said, as William McKinley lay dying, that they should be prepared for a double funeral. But this did not occur, and the former first lady accompanied her husband on the funeral train. Leech noted, "the circuitous journey was a cruel ordeal for the woman who huddled in a compartment of the funeral train, praying that the Lord would take her with her Dearest Love." She was thought too weak to attend the services in Washington or Canton, although she listened at the door to the service for her husband in her house on North Market Street. She remained in Canton for the rest of her life, setting up a shrine in her house and often visiting the receiving vault, until her death at age 59 on May 26, 1907. She died only months before the completion of the large marble monument to her husband in Canton, which was dedicated by President Roosevelt on September 30, 1907. William and Ida McKinley are interred there with their daughters atop a hillside overlooking the city of Canton.

=== Other memorials ===
In addition to the Canton site, many other memorials honor McKinley. The William McKinley Monument stands in front of the Ohio Statehouse in Columbus and a large marble statue of McKinley is situated at his birthplace in Niles. Twenty Ohio schools bear McKinley's name, and several more schools in the United States are named McKinley School. Nearly a million dollars was pledged by contributors or allocated from public funds for the construction of McKinley memorials in the year after his death. McKinley biographer Kevin Phillips suggests that the significant number of major memorials to McKinley in Ohio reflect the expectation among Ohioans in the years after McKinley's death that he would be ranked among the great presidents.

Statues bearing McKinley's image may be found in more than a dozen states, and his name has been bestowed on streets, civic organizations and libraries. In 1896, a gold prospector gave McKinley's name to Denali, the tallest mountain in North America at 20,310 feet (6,190 m). The Alaska Board of Geographic Names reverted the name of the mountain to Denali, its local appellation, in 1975. The Department of the Interior followed suit in August 2015 as a part of a visit to Alaska by President Barack Obama. On January 20, 2025, President Donald Trump issued an executive order to restore McKinley's name to the mountain. Denali National Park was known as Mount McKinley National Park until December 2, 1980, when it was changed by legislation signed by President Jimmy Carter.

=== Legacy and historical image ===
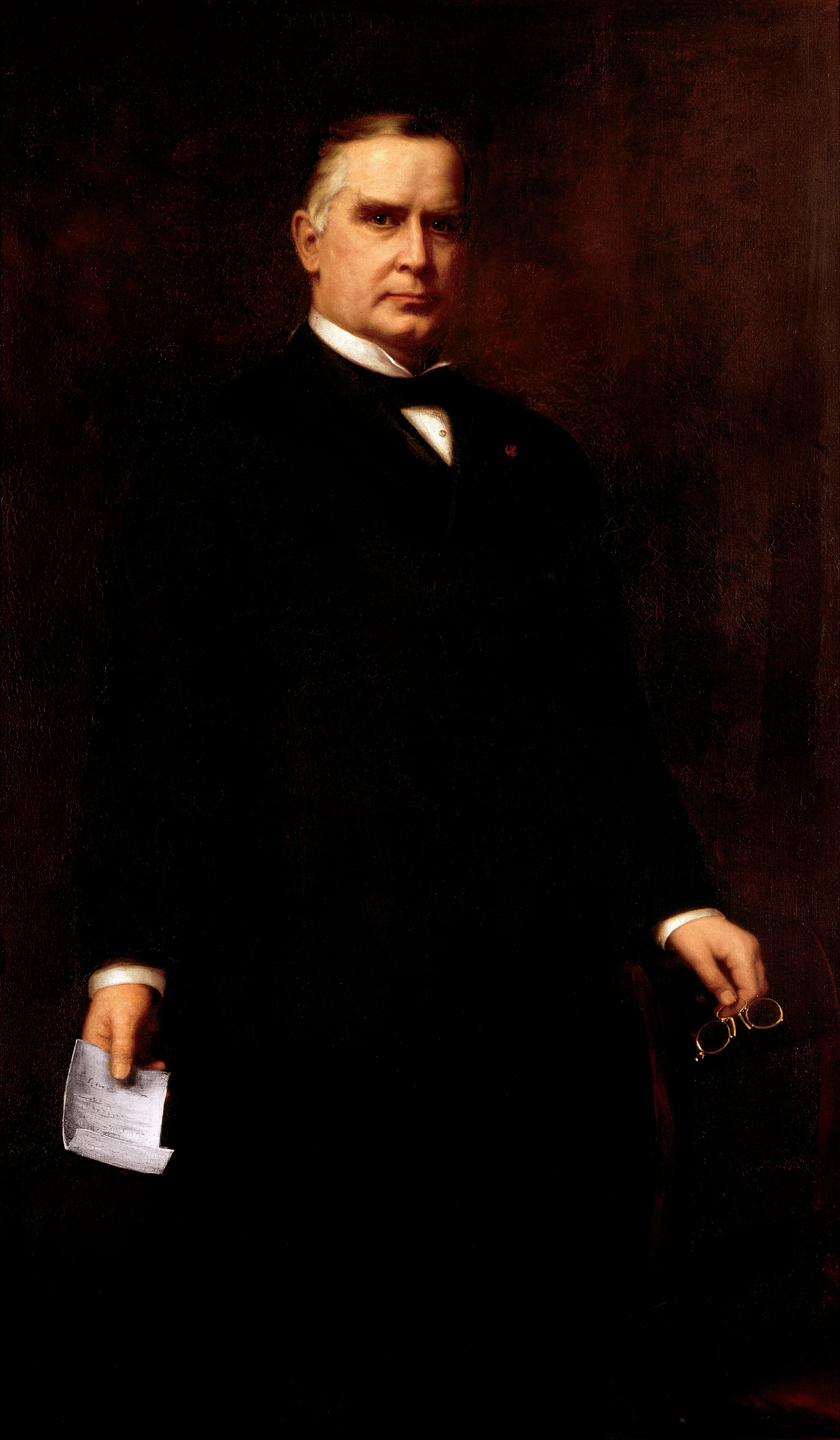
The official Presidential portrait of William McKinley, by Harriet Anderson Stubbs Murphy

McKinley's biographer H. Wayne Morgan remarks that McKinley died the most beloved president in history. But the young, enthusiastic Roosevelt quickly captured public attention. He made little effort to secure the trade reciprocity that McKinley had intended to negotiate with other nations. Controversy and public interest surrounded Roosevelt throughout the seven and a half years of his presidency as memories of McKinley faded; by 1920, according to Gould, McKinley's administration was deemed no more than "a mediocre prelude to the vigor and energy of Theodore Roosevelt's." Beginning in the 1950s, McKinley received more favorable evaluations; nevertheless, in surveys ranking American presidents, he has generally been placed near the middle, often trailing contemporaries such as Hayes and Cleveland. Morgan suggests that this relatively low ranking is the result of a perception among historians that while many decisions during McKinley's presidency profoundly affected the nation's future, he more followed public opinion than led it, and that McKinley's standing has suffered from altered public expectations of the presidency.

There has been broad agreement among historians that McKinley's election occurred at a time of a transition between two political eras, dubbed the Third and Fourth Party Systems. Kenneth F. Warren emphasizes the national commitment to a pro-business, industrial, and modernizing program represented by McKinley. Historian Daniel P. Klinghard argued that McKinley's personal control of the 1896 campaign gave him the opportunity to reshape the presidency—rather than simply follow the party platform—by representing himself as the voice of the people. Republican Karl Rove exalted McKinley as the model for a sweeping political realignment behind George W. Bush in the 2000s—a realignment that did not happen. Historian Michael J. Korzi argued in 2005 that while it is tempting to see McKinley as the key figure in the transition from congressional domination of government to the modern, powerful president, this change was an incremental process through the late 19th and early 20th centuries.

Phillips writes that McKinley's low rating is undeserved, and that he should be ranked just after the great presidents such as Washington and Lincoln. He pointed to McKinley's success at building an electoral coalition that kept the Republicans mostly in power for a generation. Phillips believes that part of McKinley's legacy is the men whom he included in his administration who dominated the Republican Party for a quarter century after his death. These officials included Cortelyou, who served in three Cabinet positions under Roosevelt, and Dawes, who became vice president under Coolidge. Other McKinley appointees who later became major figures include Day, whom Roosevelt elevated to the Supreme Court where he remained nearly 20 years, and William Howard Taft, whom McKinley had made Governor-General of the Philippines and who succeeded Roosevelt as president. After the assassination, the present United States Secret Service came into existence when the Congress deemed it necessary that presidential protection be part of its duties.

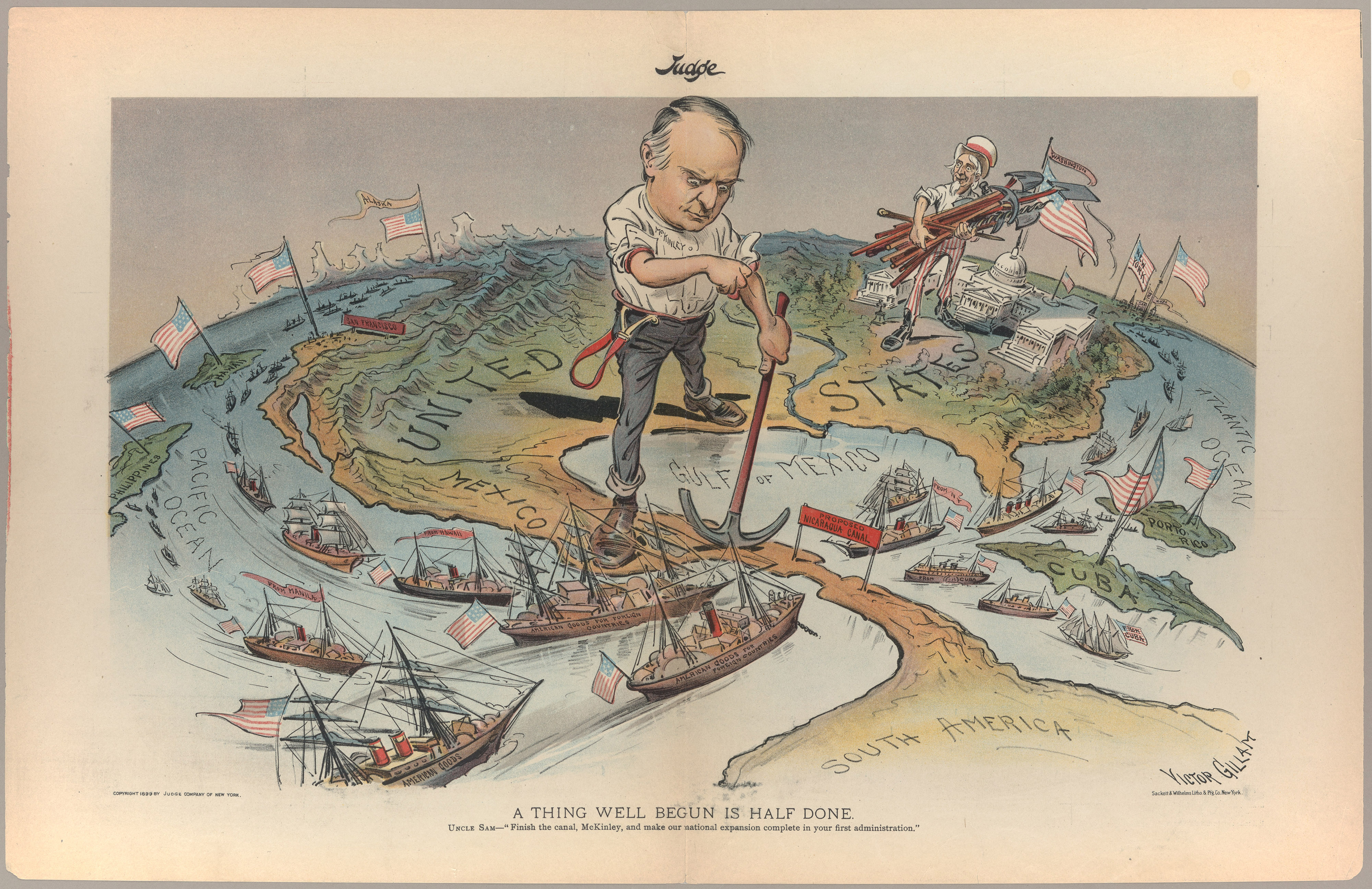
This cartoon reflects the view of Judge magazine regarding America's imperial ambitions following McKinley's quick victory in the Spanish–American War of 1898. The American flag flies from the Philippines and Hawaii in the Pacific to Cuba and Puerto Rico in the Caribbean.

A controversial aspect of McKinley's presidency is territorial expansion and the question of imperialism; with the exception of the Philippines, granted independence in 1946, the United States still retains the territories taken under McKinley. The territorial expansion of 1898 is often seen by historians as the beginning of an American empire. Morgan sees that historical discussion as a subset of the debate over the rise of America as a world power; he expects the debate over McKinley's actions to continue indefinitely without resolution, and notes that however one judges McKinley's actions in American expansion, one of his motivations was to change the lives of Filipinos and Cubans for the better.

A political conservative, McKinley presided over an administration that pursued conservative policies in relation to foreign policy, civil rights and the economy. In regards to the latter, one historian has argued that "Concerning government intervention in the economy under McKinley, the approach remained decidedly laissez-faire."

Morgan alludes to the rise of interest in McKinley as part of the debate over the more assertive American foreign policy of recent decades:

McKinley was a major actor in some of the most important events in American history. His decisions shaped future policies and public attitudes. He usually rises in the estimation of scholars who study his life in detail. Even those who disagree with his policies and decisions see him as an active, responsible, informed participant in charge of decision making. His dignified demeanor and subtle operations keep him somewhat remote from public perception. But he is once again at the center of events, where he started.

=== Gallery of memorials ===
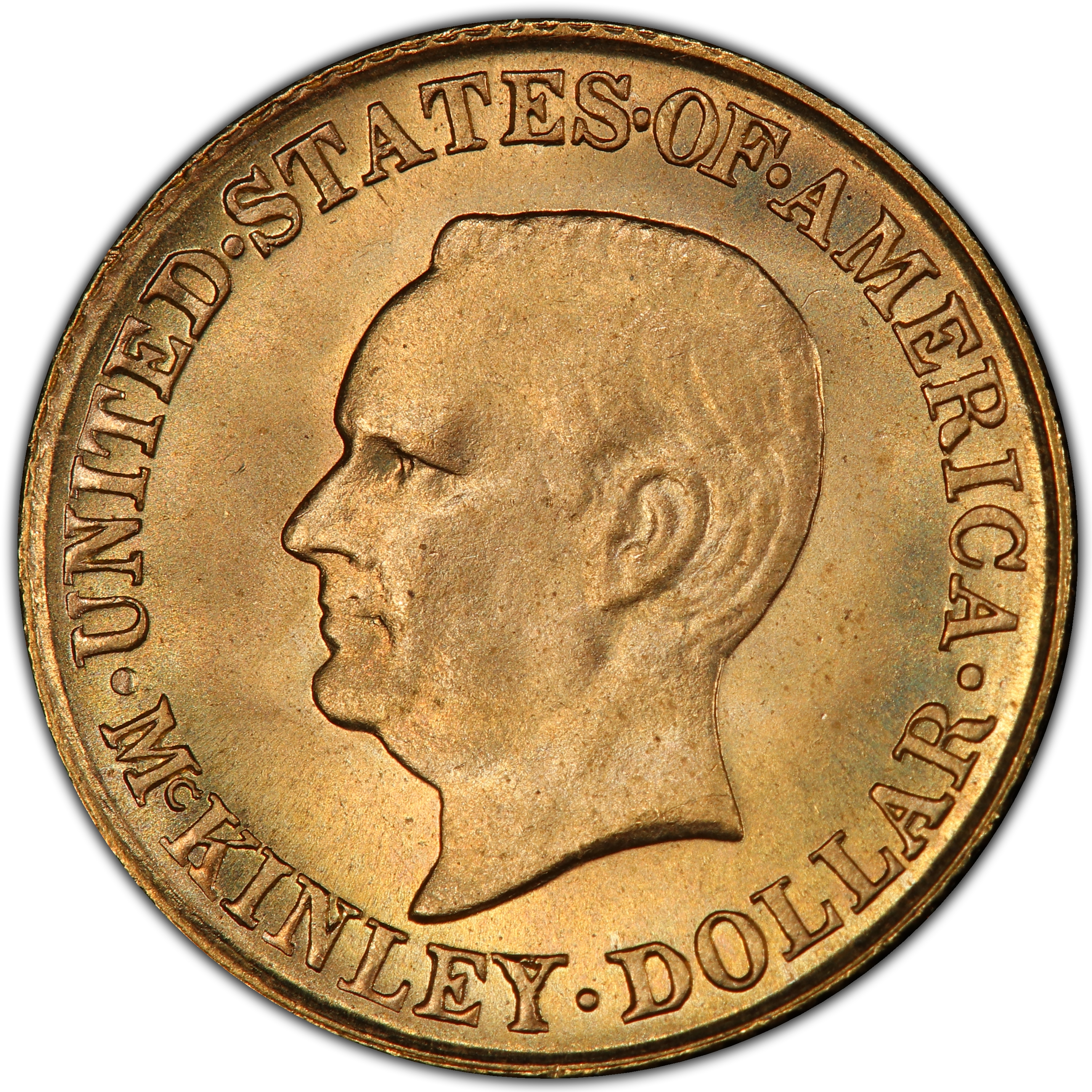
The McKinley Birthplace Memorial gold dollar was minted in 1916 and 1917.

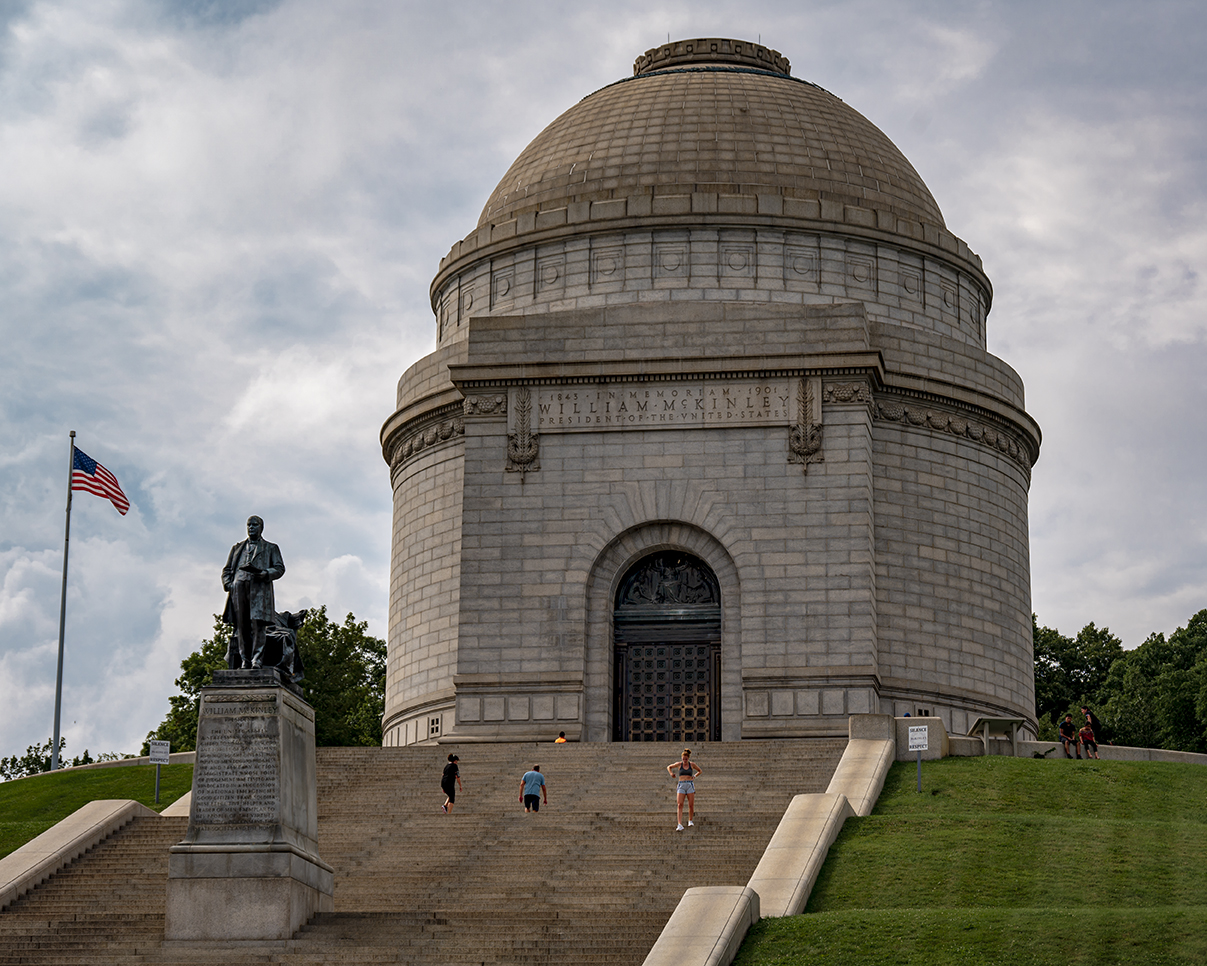
McKinley's tomb in Canton, Ohio.

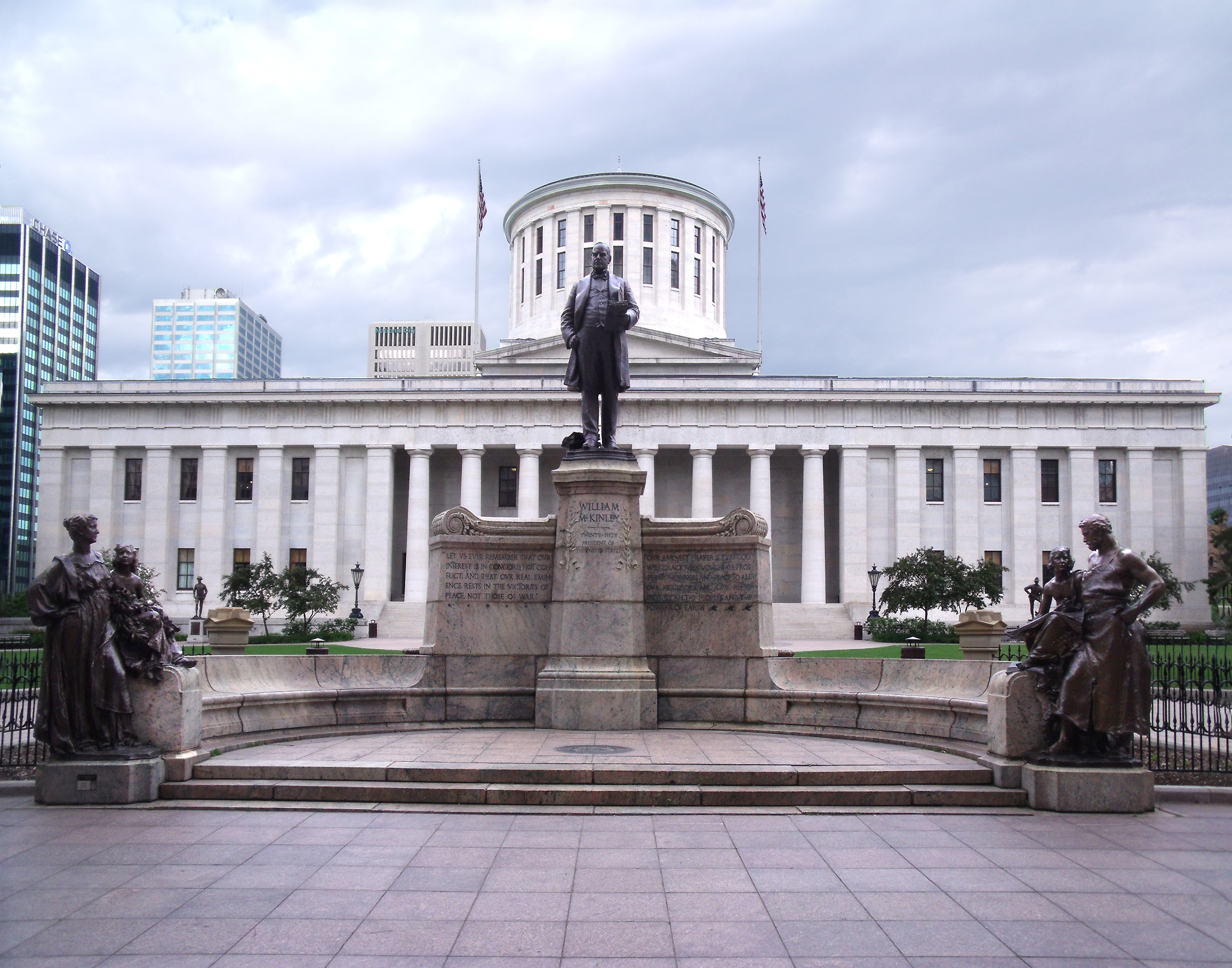
William McKinley Monument by Hermon MacNeil in front of the Ohio Statehouse, Columbus.

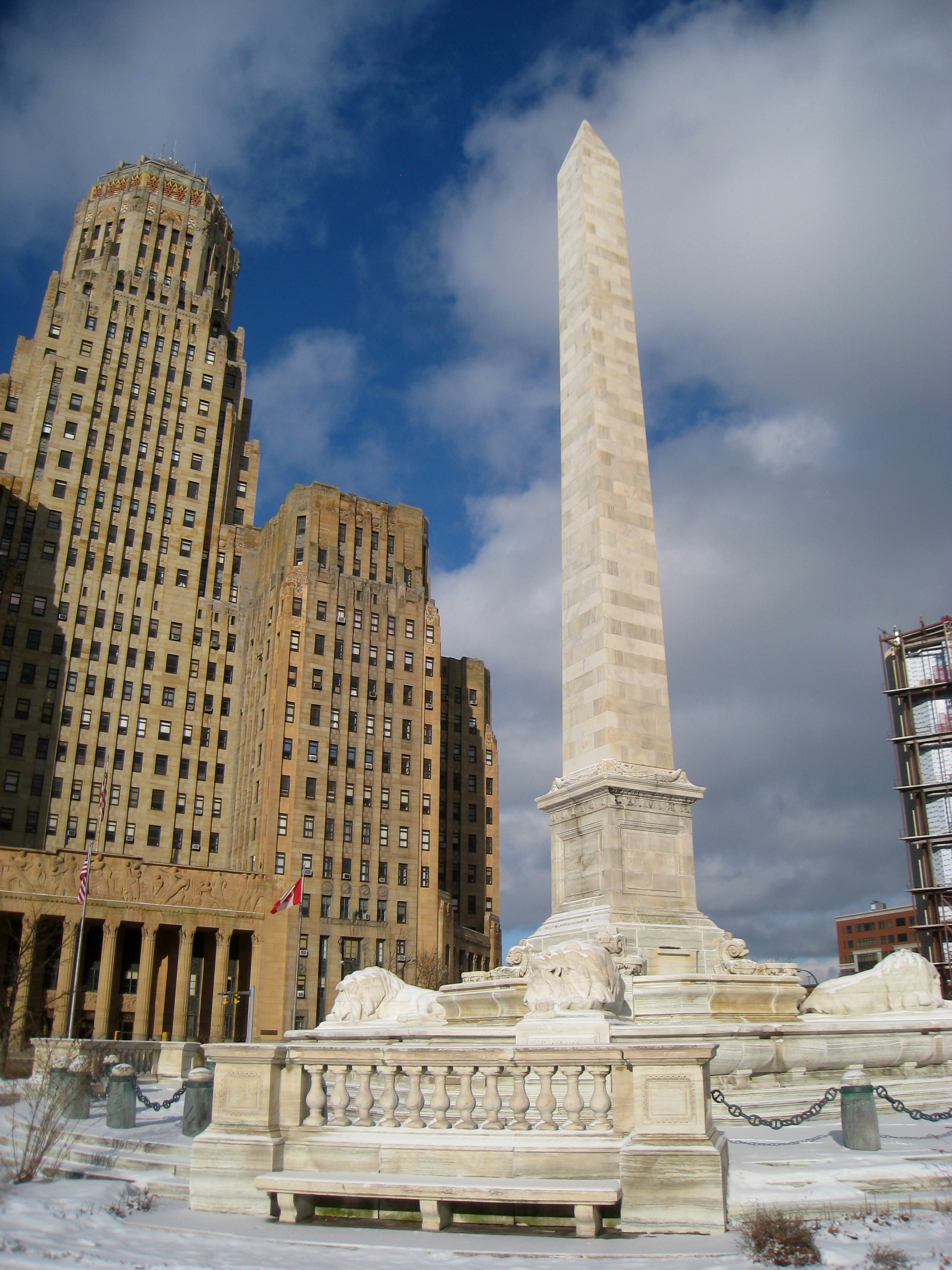
McKinley Monument by Alexander Phimister Proctor in front of Buffalo City Hall, Buffalo.

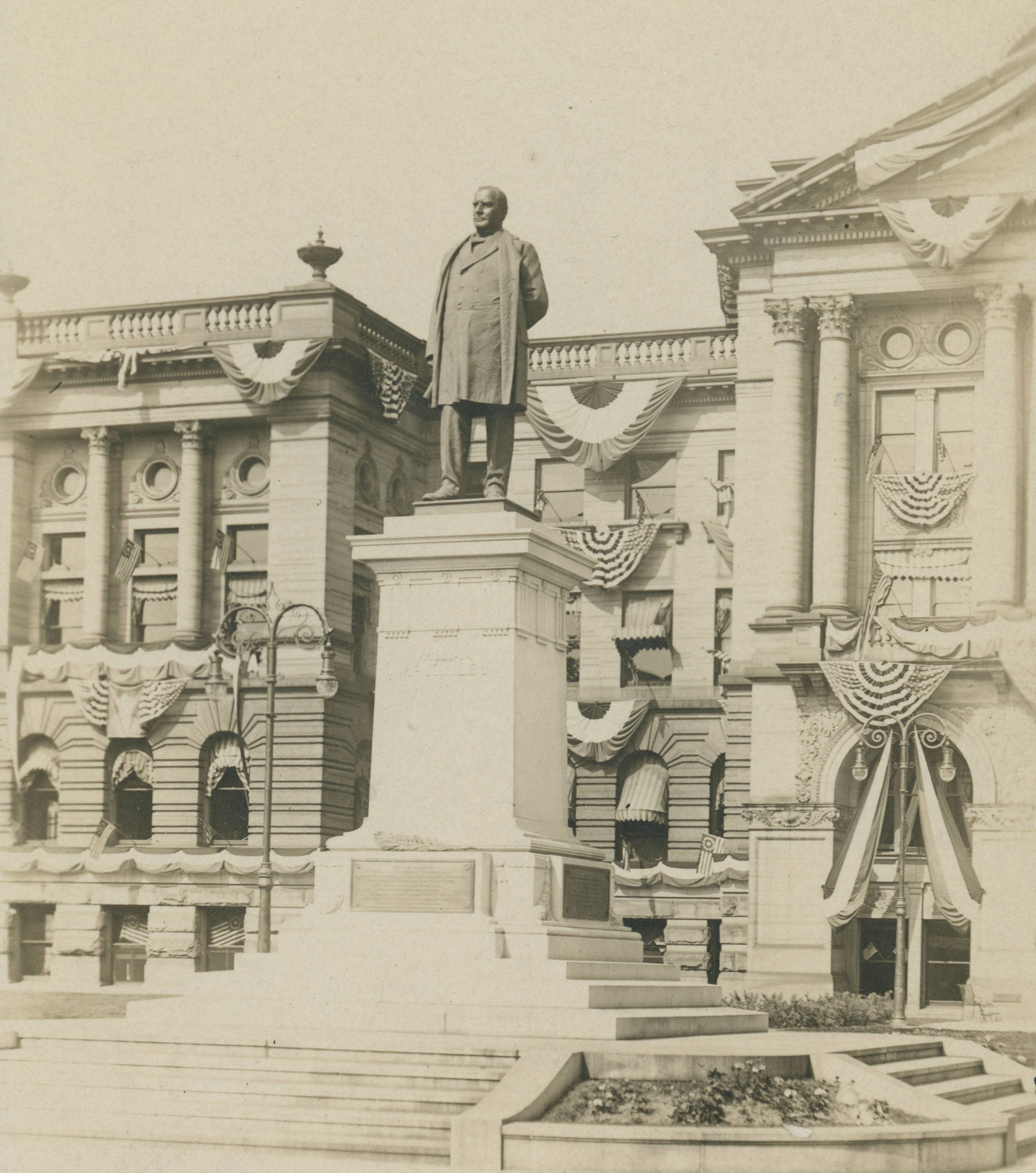
McKinley Monument in front of Lucas County Courthouse, Toledo, Ohio.

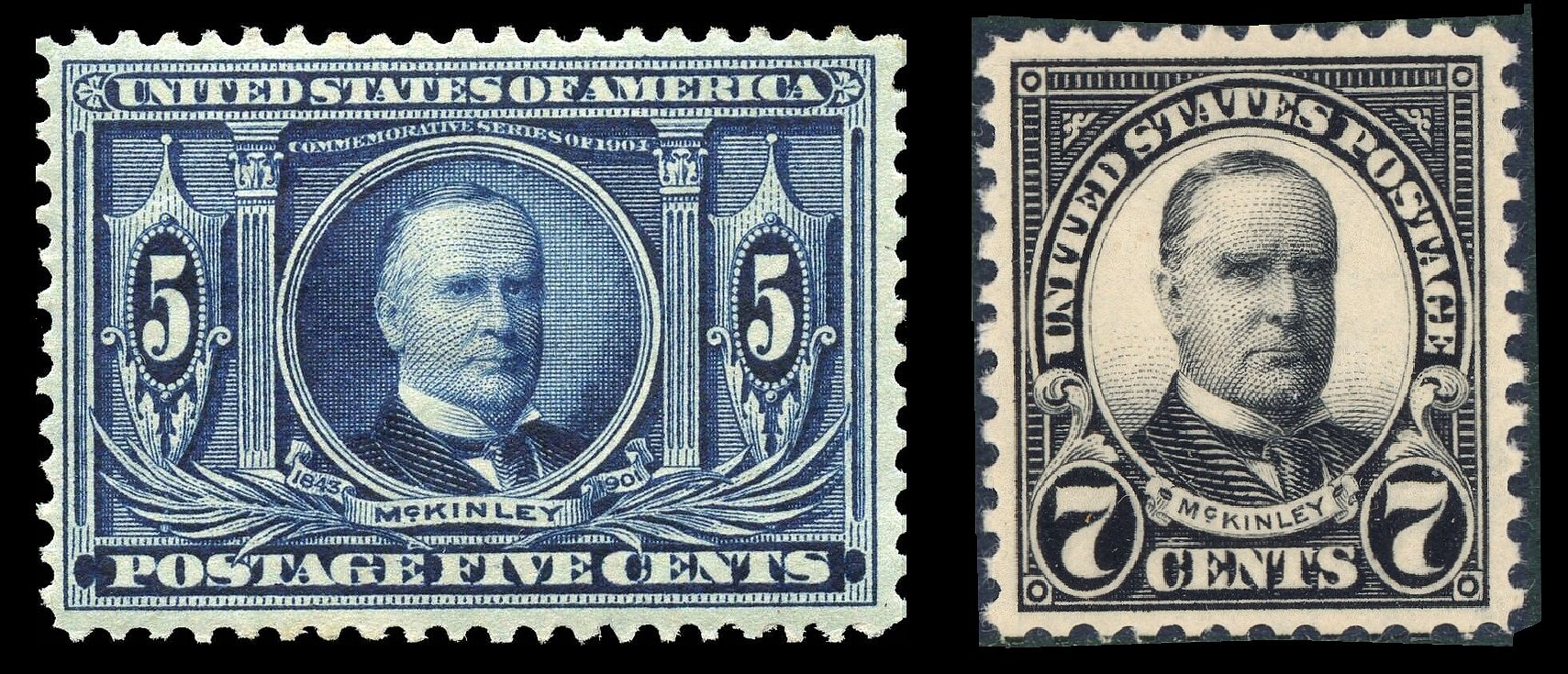
William McKinley stamp issues of 1901 and 1927

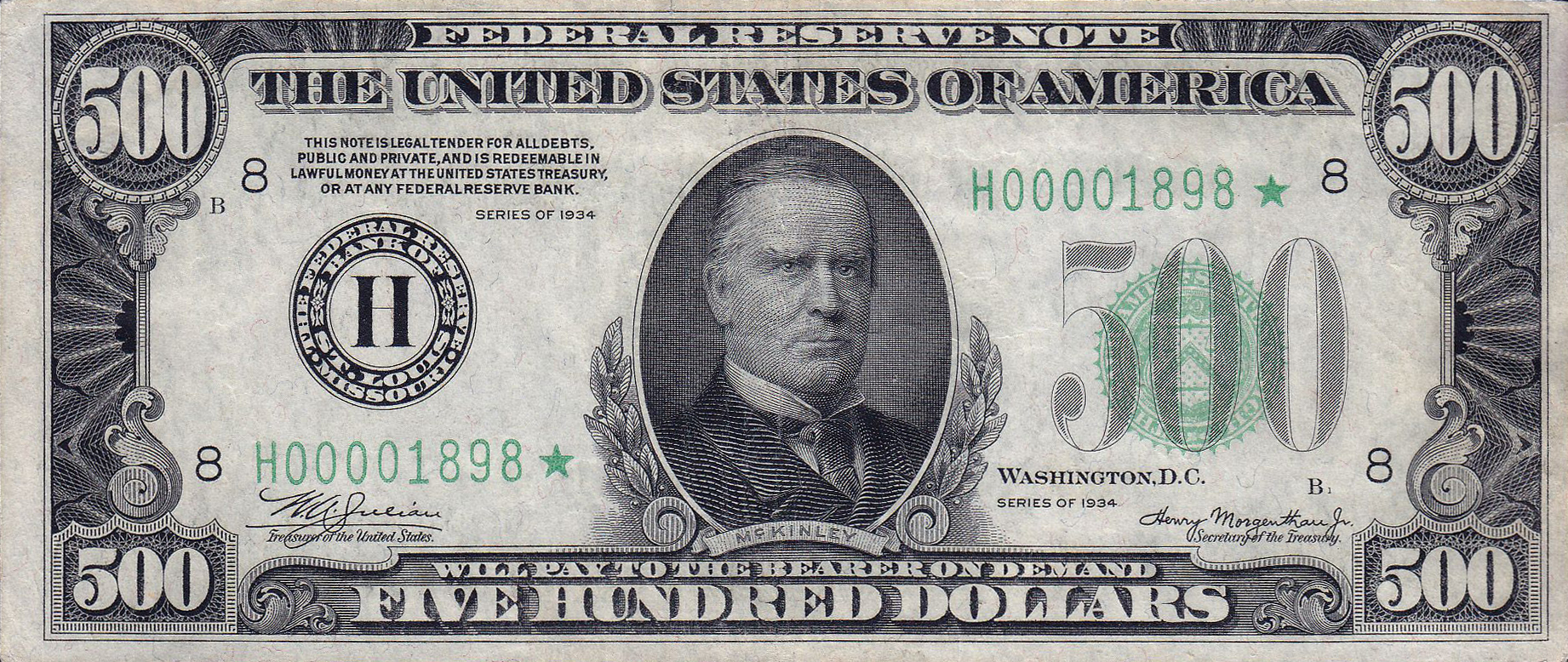
McKinley on the $500 bill

== See also ==
- List of heads of state and government who were assassinated or executed
- List of presidents of the United States
- List of presidents of the United States by previous experience
- List of United States presidential assassination attempts and plots
- McKinley at Home, Canton, Ohio (1896 film)

== Notes ==
Party political offices
Preceded by Joseph B. Foraker	Republican nominee for Governor of Ohio; 1891, 1893	Succeeded by Asa S. Bushnell
Preceded by Benjamin Harrison	Republican nominee for President of the United States; 1896, 1900	Succeeded by Theodore Roosevelt
U.S. House of Representatives
Preceded by Laurin D. Woodworth	Member of the U.S. House of Representatives from Ohio's 17th congressional district 1877–1879	Succeeded by James Monroe
Preceded by Lorenzo Danford	Member of the U.S. House of Representatives from Ohio's 16th congressional district 1879–1881	Succeeded by Jonathan T. Updegraff
Preceded by James Monroe	Member of the U.S. House of Representatives from Ohio's 17th congressional district 1881–1883	Succeeded by Joseph D. Taylor
Preceded by Addison S. McClure	Member of the U.S. House of Representatives from Ohio's 18th congressional district 1883–1884	Succeeded by Jonathan Wallace
Preceded by David R. Paige	Member of the U.S. House of Representatives from Ohio's 20th congressional district 1885–1887	Succeeded by George W. Crouse
Preceded by Isaac H. Taylor	Member of the U.S. House of Representatives from Ohio's 18th congressional district 1887–1891	Succeeded by Joseph D. Taylor
Preceded by Roger Q. Mills	Chair of the House Committee on Ways and Means; 1889–1891	Succeeded by William McKendree Springer
Political offices
Preceded by James E. Campbell	Governor of Ohio; 1892–1896	Succeeded by Asa Bushnell
Preceded by Grover Cleveland	President of the United States; 1897–1901	Succeeded by Theodore Roosevelt
