= Asia (disambiguation) =

Asia is the world's largest continent.

Asia may also refer to:

== Places ==
- Asia District, Peru, a beach district
- Asia District, Oklahoma City, Oklahoma, United States
- Asia Islands, islands in Indonesia close to Palau
- Asia Minor, a peninsula containing Asia and several other Roman provinces
- Asia-Pacific, the part of the world in or near the Western Pacific Ocean
- Asia (Roman province), a part of the Roman Empire occupying the Anatolian peninsula (in modern-day Turkey)
- Asia, Tennessee, United States, an unincorporated community
- Asia, Texas, United States, an unincorporated community
- 67 Asia, a large main-belt asteroid

== People with the name ==
=== Given name ===
- Asia Agcaoili (born 1977), Filipino actress
- Asia Alfasi (born 1984), British writer
- Asia Amjad, Pakistani politician
- Asia Ramazan Antar (1997–2016), Kurdish fighter
- Asia Argento (born 1975), Italian actress
- Asia Bibi (born 1971), Pakistani Christian woman Aasiya Noreen who was acquitted of blasphemy
- Asia Bragonzi (born 2001), Italian footballer
- Asia Carrera (born 1973), American pornographic actress
- Asia Booth Clarke (1835–1888), American writer
- Asia Cruise (born 1990), American singer
- Asia D'Amato (born 2003), Italian artistic gymnast
- Asia Kate Dillon (born 1984), American actor
- Asia Durr (born 1997), American basketball player
- Asia Harris (born 2004), English squash player
- Asia Hogan-Rochester (born 1999), Canadian rugby sevens player
- Asia Khattak, Pakistani politician
- Asia Khatun (born 1963), Bangladeshi civil servant
- Asia Lanzi (born 2002), Italian skateboarder
- Asia Mackay (born 1980), British novelist
- Asia Muhammad (born 1991), American tennis player
- Asia Nitollano (born 1988), former member of The Pussycat Dolls
- Asia O'Hara (born 1982), American drag queen
- Asia Ortega (born 1995), Spanish actress
- Asia Ray Smith (born 1988), American actress
- Asia Tawfiq Wahbi (1980–1901), Iraqi writer and social reformer
- Asia Taylor (born 1991), American basketball player
- Asia Vieira (born 1982), Canadian actress
- Asia Youngman, Canadian filmmaker
- Asia Monet Ray (born 2005), an American dancer

=== Surname ===
- Daniel Asia (born 1953), American composer

=== Others ===
- Asiya, in Islam, adoptive mother of Moses and wife of the last Pharaoh
- Asia of Diauehi, king of the ancient people of the Diauehi in northeastern Anatolia (circa 850–825 BC)
- Mr Asia or Marty Johnstone (1951–1979), a New Zealand drug dealer
- Planet Asia (born 1976), an American rapper

== Media ==
=== Films ===
- Asia (film), a 2020 Israeli film
- Asiya (film), a 1960 Indian film

=== Television shows ===
- Asia Bagus, a pan-Asian telent search show
- Asia (2024 TV series), a 2024 BBC television documentary series

=== Television channels and radio stations ===
- Asia Business News, a defunct business news channel
- Asia-Pacific Broadcasting Union
- Asia Television, a Hong Kong media company and defunct Hong Kong television channel
- Asia Television Network, a defunct Indian television channel
- BBC Asian Network, a British radio station
- Channel NewsAsia, the former name of Singapore-based news channel CNA (TV network)
- Discovery Asia, a television channel
- Heart of Asia Channel, a Philippine television channel
- Living Asia Channel, a Philippine television channel
- TV Asia

=== Other ===
- AsiaOne, a Singaporean news website

== Music ==
- Asia (band), an English rock band
  - Asia (Asia album) (1982)
- Asia (Boris album) (2015)
- A.S.I.A., a Romanian girl group

== Mythology ==
- Asia (mythology), several figures from Greek mythology, including:
  - Asia (Oceanid), one of the Oceanids, said to be the namesake of the continent of Asia

== Other uses ==
- American Spinal Injury Association (ASIA)
- ASIA, Autoimmune/inflammatory syndrome induced by adjuvants, also known as Shoenfeld's syndrome
- Asia (magazine), an American magazine in the 1920s and 1930s
- Asia (Miami), a residential skyscraper
- Asia (ship), numerous ships so-named over the centuries
- Asia (soft drink brand)
- Asia Motors, a Korean car manufacturer acquired by Hyundai's Kia Motors unit
- Asia, a sculpture in front of the Alexander Hamilton U.S. Custom House

== See also ==
- Radio Free Asia (disambiguation)
- Ayesha (disambiguation)
