= March 4 =

March 4 this year in various calendars
- Wednesday, 4 March 2026
Akan	Kwawukuo
Armenian	17 Areg 1475
Aztec	Tecuilhuitontli 13, 2 Cipactli
Babylonian	14 Shabatu, 2336 SE
Balinese pawukon	Luang, Pepet, Beteng, Sri, Keliwon, Was, Buda of Ugu, Sri, Ogan, Manuh
Bengali	19 Falgun, BS 1432
Chinese	Yin Fire Ox・Chariot Mansion; Fire Horse Year, Month 1, Day 16 (Yushui, 1 day until Jingzhe)
Common Era	4 March 2026 CE
Coptic	25 Meshir, AM 1742
Egyptian	22 Epiphi, 2774 NE
Ethiopian	25 Yakātit, 2018 Amätä Məhrät
French Republican	Décade II, Quartidi de Ventôse de l'Année 234 de la République
Gregorian	4 March, AD 2026
Hebrew	15 Adar, AM 5786
Hindu	Pūrvaphalgunī・Dhṛti; Solar: 20 Phālguna, 1947 SE; Lunisolar: Pratipada, Kṛishna pakṣa of Phālguna, 2082 VE; Rāudra・5126 KY・1,872,638
Icelandic	Miðvikudagur, 11 Góa 2025
Islamic	15 Ramadan, AH 1447 (using tabular method)
ISO week date	2026-W10-3
Japanese	16 Mutsuki, Reiwa 8 (Usui, 1 day until Keichitsu)
Julian	19 February, AD 2026 (AM 7534)
Julian day	2461104
Korean	16 Horangidal, 4359 DE
Maya	13.0.13.7.1; 19 Kayab, 2 Imix
Roman	ante diem XI Kalendas Martias, MMDCCLXXIX AUC
Solar Hijri	13 Esfand, SH 1404
Tibetan	16 mchu, me pho rta 2153 or 1772 or 1000

<<	March					>>
Su	Mo	Tu	We	Th	Fr	Sa
1	2	3	4	5	6	7
8	9	10	11	12	13	14
15	16	17	18	19	20	21
22	23	24	25	26	27	28
29	30	31
2026

March 4 in recent years
2026 (Wednesday)
2025 (Tuesday)
2024 (Monday)
2023 (Saturday)
2022 (Friday)
2021 (Thursday)
2020 (Wednesday)
2019 (Monday)
2018 (Sunday)
2017 (Saturday)

March 4 is the 63rd day of the year (64th in leap years) in the Gregorian calendar; 302 days remain until the end of the year.

== Events ==
=== Pre-1600 ===
- AD 51 – Nero, later to become Roman emperor, is given the title princeps iuventutis (head of the youth).
- 306 – Martyrdom of Saint Adrian of Nicomedia.
- 581 – Yang Jian declares himself Emperor Wen of Sui, ending the Northern Zhou and beginning the Sui dynasty.
- 852 – Croatian Knez Trpimir I issues a statute, a document with the first known written mention of the Croats name in Croatian sources.
- 938 – Translation of the relics of martyr Wenceslaus I, Duke of Bohemia, Prince of the Czechs.
- 1152 – Frederick I Barbarossa is elected King of Germany.
- 1171 – Alexios II Komnenos is crowned Byzantine co-emperor to his father Manuel I Komnenos.
- 1238 – The Battle of the Sit River begins two centuries of Mongol horde domination of Rus.
- 1351 – Ramathibodi becomes King of Siam.
- 1386 – Władysław II Jagiełło (Jogaila) is crowned King of Poland.
- 1461 – Wars of the Roses in England: Lancastrian King Henry VI is deposed by his House of York cousin, who then becomes King Edward IV.
- 1493 – Explorer Christopher Columbus arrives back in Lisbon, Portugal, aboard his ship Niña from his voyage to what are now The Bahamas and other islands in the Caribbean.
- 1519 – Hernán Cortés arrives in Mexico in search of the Aztec civilization and its wealth.

=== 1601–1900 ===
- 1628 – The Massachusetts Bay Colony is granted a Royal charter.
- 1665 – English King Charles II declares war on the Netherlands, marking the start of the Second Anglo-Dutch War.
- 1675 – John Flamsteed is appointed the first Astronomer Royal of England.
- 1681 – Charles II grants a land charter to William Penn for the area that will later become Pennsylvania.
- 1686 – After being unofficially established as a settlement in 1678, the Dominican mission of Ilagan is founded in the Philippines.
- 1773 – Wolfgang Amadeus Mozart departs Italy after the last of his three tours there.
- 1776 – American Revolutionary War: The Continental Army fortifies Dorchester Heights with cannon, leading the British troops to abandon the Siege of Boston.
- 1789 – In New York City, the first Congress of the United States meets, putting the United States Constitution into effect.
- 1790 – France is divided into 83 départements, cutting across the former provinces in an attempt to dislodge regional loyalties based on ownership of land by the nobility.
- 1791 – Vermont is admitted to the United States as the fourteenth state.
- 1794 – The 11th Amendment to the U.S. Constitution is passed by the U.S. Congress.
- 1797 – John Adams is inaugurated as the 2nd President of the United States of America, becoming the first President to begin his presidency on March 4.
- 1804 – Castle Hill Rebellion: Irish convicts rebel against British colonial authority in the Colony of New South Wales.
- 1813 – Cyril VI of Constantinople is elected Ecumenical Patriarch of Constantinople.
- 1814 – War of 1812: Americans defeat British forces at the Battle of Longwoods between London, Ontario and Thamesville, near present-day Wardsville, Ontario.
- 1837 – The city of Chicago is incorporated.
- 1848 – Carlo Alberto di Savoia signs the Statuto Albertino that will later represent the first constitution of the Regno d'Italia.
- 1849 – Zachary Taylor, 12th President of the United States of America and Millard Fillmore, 12th Vice President, did not take their respective oaths of office (they did so the following day), leading to the erroneous theory that outgoing President pro tempore of the United States Senate David Rice Atchison had assumed the role of acting president for one day.
- 1861 – The first national flag of the Confederate States of America (the "Stars and Bars") is adopted.
- 1865 – The third and final national flag of the Confederate States of America is adopted by the Confederate Congress.
- 1865 – U.S. politician Andrew Johnson makes his drunk vice-presidential inaugural address in Washington, D.C.
- 1878 – Pope Leo XIII reestablishes the Catholic Church in Scotland, recreating sees and naming bishops for the first time since 1603.
- 1882 – Britain's first electric trams run in east London.
- 1890 – The longest bridge in Great Britain, the Forth Bridge in Scotland, measuring 8,094 feet (2,467 m) long, is opened by the Duke of Rothesay, later King Edward VII.
- 1899 – Cyclone Mahina sweeps in north of Cooktown, Queensland, with a 12 metres (39 ft) wave that reaches up to 5 kilometres (3.1 mi) inland, killing over 300.

=== 1901–present ===
- 1901 – William McKinley is inaugurated President of the United States for the second time; Theodore Roosevelt is vice president.
- 1908 – The Collinwood school fire, Collinwood near Cleveland, Ohio, kills 174 people.
- 1909 – U.S. President William Howard Taft uses what became known as a Saxbe fix, a mechanism to avoid the restriction of the U.S. Constitution's Ineligibility Clause, to appoint Philander C. Knox as U.S. Secretary of State.
- 1913 – First Balkan War: The Greek army engages the Turks at Bizani, resulting in victory two days later.
- 1913 – The United States Department of Labor is formed.
- 1917 – Jeannette Rankin of Montana becomes the first female member of the United States House of Representatives.
- 1918 – A case of influenza is recorded at Camp Funston, Kansas, conventionally marking the beginning of the worldwide Spanish flu pandemic.
- 1933 – Franklin D. Roosevelt is inaugurated as the 32nd President of the United States.
- 1933 – The United States Senate confirms Frances Perkins as United States Secretary of Labor and she is sworn in the same day, making her the first female member of the United States Cabinet.
- 1933 – The Parliament of Austria is suspended because of a quibble over procedure – Chancellor Engelbert Dollfuss initiates an authoritarian rule by decree.
- 1941 – World War II: The United Kingdom launches Operation Claymore on the Lofoten Islands, the first large-scale British Commando raid.
- 1943 – World War II: The Battle of the Bismarck Sea in the south-west Pacific comes to an end.
- 1943 – World War II: The Battle of Fardykambos, one of the first major battles between the Greek Resistance and the occupying Royal Italian Army, begins. It ends on 6 March with the surrender of an entire Italian battalion and the liberation of the town of Grevena.
- 1944 – World War II: After the success of Big Week, the USAAF begins a daylight bombing campaign of Berlin.
- 1946 – The sixth President of Finland, Gustaf Mannerheim, submits his resignation for health reasons.
- 1955 – An order to protect the endangered Saimaa ringed seal (Pusa hispida saimensis) is legalized.
- 1957 – The S&P 500 stock market index is introduced, replacing the S&P 90.
- 1960 – The French freighter La Coubre explodes in Havana, Cuba, killing 100.
- 1962 – A Caledonian Airways Douglas DC-7 crashes shortly after takeoff from Cameroon, killing 111 – the worst crash of a DC-7.
- 1966 – A Canadian Pacific Air Lines DC-8-43 explodes on landing at Tokyo International Airport, killing 64 people.
- 1966 – In an interview in the London Evening Standard, the Beatles' John Lennon declares that the band is "more popular than Jesus now".
- 1970 – French submarine Eurydice explodes underwater, resulting in the loss of the entire 57-man crew.
- 1976 – The Northern Ireland Constitutional Convention is formally dissolved in Northern Ireland, resulting in direct rule of Northern Ireland from London by the British parliament.
- 1977 – The 1977 Vrancea earthquake in eastern and southern Europe kills more than 1,500, mostly in Bucharest, Romania.
- 1980 – Nationalist leader Robert Mugabe wins a sweeping election victory to become Zimbabwe's first black prime minister.
- 1985 – The Food and Drug Administration approves a blood test for HIV infection, used since then for screening all blood donations in the United States.
- 1986 – The Soviet Vega 1 begins returning images of Halley's Comet and the first images of its nucleus.
- 1990 – American basketball player Hank Gathers dies after collapsing during the semifinals of a West Coast Conference tournament game.
- 1990 – Lennox Sebe, President for life of the South African Bantustan of Ciskei, is ousted from power in a bloodless military coup led by Brigadier Oupa Gqozo.
- 1994 – Space Shuttle program: The Space Shuttle Columbia is launched on STS-62.
- 1996 – A derailed train in Weyauwega, Wisconsin (USA) causes the emergency evacuation of 2,300 people for 16 days.
- 1998 – Gay rights: Oncale v. Sundowner Offshore Services, Inc.: The Supreme Court of the United States rules that federal laws banning on-the-job sexual harassment also apply when both parties are the same sex.
- 2001 – BBC bombing: A massive car bomb explodes in front of the BBC Television Centre in London, seriously injuring one person; the attack was attributed to the Real IRA.
- 2002 – Afghanistan: Seven American Special Operations Forces soldiers and 200 Al-Qaeda Fighters are killed as American forces attempt to infiltrate the Shah-i-Kot Valley on a low-flying helicopter reconnaissance mission.
- 2009 – The International Criminal Court (ICC) issues an arrest warrant for Sudanese President Omar Hassan al-Bashir for war crimes and crimes against humanity in Darfur. Al-Bashir is the first sitting head of state to be indicted by the ICC since its establishment in 2002.
- 2012 – A series of explosions is reported at a munitions dump in Brazzaville, the capital of the Republic of the Congo, killing at least 250 people.
- 2015 – At least 34 miners die in a suspected gas explosion at the Zasyadko coal mine in the rebel-held Donetsk region of Ukraine.
- 2018 – Former MI6 spy Sergei Skripal and his daughter are poisoned with a Novichok nerve agent in Salisbury, England, causing a diplomatic uproar that results in mass-expulsions of diplomats from all countries involved.
- 2020 – Nik Wallenda becomes the first person to walk over the Masaya Volcano in Nicaragua.

== Births ==
=== Pre–1600 ===
- 895 – Liu Zhiyuan, founder of the Later Han Dynasty (died 948)
- 977 – Al-Musabbihi, Fatimid historian and official (died 1030)
- 1188 – Blanche of Castile, French queen consort (died 1252)
- 1394 – Henry the Navigator, Portuguese explorer (died 1460)
- 1484 – George, margrave of Brandenburg-Ansbach (died 1543)
- 1492 – Francesco de Layolle, Italian organist and composer (died 1540)
- 1502 – Elisabeth of Hesse, princess of Saxony (died 1557)
- 1519 – Hindal Mirza, Mughal prince (died 1551)
- 1526 – Henry Carey, 1st Baron Hunsdon (died 1596)

=== 1601–1900 ===
- 1602 – Kanō Tan'yū, Japanese painter (died 1674)
- 1634 – Kazimierz Łyszczyński, Polish philosopher (died 1689)
- 1651 – John Somers, 1st Baron Somers, English lawyer, jurist, and politician, Lord High Chancellor of Great Britain (died 1716)
- 1655 – Fra Galgario, Italian painter (died 1743)
- 1665 – Philip Christoph von Königsmarck, Swedish soldier (died 1694)
- 1678 – Antonio Vivaldi, Italian violinist and composer (died 1741)
- 1702 – Jack Sheppard, English criminal (died 1724)
- 1706 – Lauritz de Thurah, Danish architect, designed the Hermitage Hunting Lodge and Gammel Holtegård (died 1759)
- 1715 – James Waldegrave, 2nd Earl Waldegrave, English historian and politician (died 1763)
- 1719 – George Pigot, 1st Baron Pigot, English politician (died 1777)
- 1729 – Anne d'Arpajon, French wife of Philippe de Noailles (died 1794)
- 1745 – Charles Dibdin, English actor, playwright, and composer (died 1814)
- 1745 – Casimir Pulaski, Polish-American general (died 1779)
- 1756 – Henry Raeburn, Scottish portrait painter (died 1823)
- 1760 – William Payne, English painter (died 1830)
- 1760 – Hugh Ronalds, British nurseryman who cultivated and documented 300 varieties of apples (died 1833)
- 1769 – Muhammad Ali, Ottoman military leader and pasha (died 1849)
- 1770 – Joseph Jacotot, French philosopher and academic (died 1840)
- 1778 – Robert Emmet, Irish republican (died 1803)
- 1781 – Rebecca Gratz, American educator and philanthropist (died 1869)
- 1782 – Johann Rudolf Wyss, Swiss philosopher, author, and academic (died 1830)
- 1792 – Isaac Lea, American conchologist, geologist, and publisher (died 1886)
- 1793 – Karl Lachmann, German philologist and critic (died 1851)
- 1800 – William Price, Welsh physician, Chartist, and neo-Druid (died 1893)
- 1814 – Napoleon Collins, Rear Admiral of the United States Navy during the Mexican–American War and the American Civil War (died 1875)
- 1815 – Mykhailo Verbytsky, Ukrainian composer of religious hymns and the national anthem of Ukraine (died 1870)
- 1817 – Edwards Pierrepont, American lawyer and politician, 34th United States Attorney General (died 1892)
- 1820 – Francesco Bentivegna, Italian rebel leader (died 1856)
- 1822 – Jules Antoine Lissajous, French mathematician and academic (died 1880)
- 1823 – George Caron, Canadian businessman and politician (died 1902)
- 1826 – August Johann Gottfried Bielenstein, German linguist, ethnographer, and theologian (died 1907)
- 1826 – John Buford, American general (died 1863)
- 1826 – Elme Marie Caro, French philosopher and academic (died 1887)
- 1826 – Theodore Judah, American engineer, founded the Central Pacific Railroad (died 1863)
- 1828 – Owen Wynne Jones, Welsh clergyman and poet (died 1870)
- 1838 – Paul Lacôme, French pianist, cellist, and composer (died 1920)
- 1847 – Carl Josef Bayer, Austrian chemist and academic (died 1904)
- 1851 – Alexandros Papadiamantis, Greek author and poet (died 1911)
- 1854 – Napier Shaw, English meteorologist and academic (died 1945)
- 1856 – Alfred William Rich, English painter, author, and educator (died 1921)
- 1861 – Arthur Cushman McGiffert, American theologian and author (died 1933)
- 1862 – Jacob Robert Emden, Swiss astrophysicist and meteorologist (died 1940)
- 1863 – R. I. Pocock, English zoologist and archaeologist (died 1947)
- 1863 – John Henry Wigmore, American academic and jurist (died 1943)
- 1864 – David W. Taylor, American admiral, architect, and engineer (died 1940)
- 1866 – Eugène Cosserat, French mathematician and astronomer (died 1931)
- 1867 – Jacob L. Beilhart, American activist, founded the Spirit Fruit Society (died 1908)
- 1867 – Charles Pelot Summerall, American Army officer (died 1955)
- 1870 – Thomas Sturge Moore, English author and poet (died 1944)
- 1871 – Boris Galerkin, Russian mathematician and engineer (died 1945)
- 1873 – Guy Wetmore Carryl, American journalist and poet (died 1904)
- 1873 – John H. Trumbull, American colonel and politician, 70th Governor of Connecticut (died 1961)
- 1875 – Mihály Károlyi, Hungarian politician, President of Hungary (died 1955)
- 1875 – Enrique Larreta, Argentinian historian and author (died 1961)
- 1876 – Léon-Paul Fargue, French poet and author (died 1947)
- 1876 – Theodore Hardeen, Hungarian-American magician (died 1945)
- 1877 – Alexander Goedicke, Russian pianist and composer (died 1957)
- 1877 – Fritz Graebner, German geographer and ethnologist (died 1934)
- 1877 – Garrett Morgan, African-American inventor (died 1963)
- 1878 – Takeo Arishima, Japanese author and critic (died 1923)
- 1878 – Egbert Van Alstyne, American pianist and songwriter (died 1951)
- 1879 – Bernhard Kellermann, German author and poet (died 1951)
- 1880 – Channing Pollock, American playwright and critic (died 1946)
- 1881 – Todor Aleksandrov, Bulgarian educator and activist (died 1924)
- 1881 – Thomas Sigismund Stribling, American lawyer and author (died 1965)
- 1881 – Richard C. Tolman, American physicist and chemist (died 1948)
- 1882 – Nicolae Titulescu, Romanian academic and politician, 61st Romanian Minister of Foreign Affairs (died 1941)
- 1883 – Maude Fealy, American actress and screenwriter (died 1971)
- 1883 – Robert Emmett Keane, American actor (died 1981)
- 1883 – Sam Langford, Canadian-American boxer (died 1956)
- 1884 – Red Murray, American baseball player (died 1958)
- 1884 – Lee Shumway, American actor (died 1959)
- 1886 – Paul Bazelaire, French cellist and composer (died 1958)
- 1888 – Rafaela Ottiano, Italian-American actress (died 1942)
- 1888 – Jeff Pfeffer, American baseball player (died 1972)
- 1888 – Emma Richter, German paleontologist (died 1956)
- 1888 – Knute Rockne, American football player and coach (died 1931)
- 1889 – Oscar Chisini, Italian mathematician and statistician (died 1967)
- 1889 – Oren E. Long, American soldier and politician, 10th Territorial Governor of Hawaii (died 1965)
- 1889 – Pearl White, American actress (died 1938)
- 1889 – Robert William Wood, English-American painter (died 1979)
- 1890 – Norman Bethune, Canadian soldier and physician (died 1939)
- 1891 – Dazzy Vance, American baseball player (died 1961)
- 1893 – Charles Herbert Colvin, American engineer, co-founded the Pioneer Instrument Company (died 1985)
- 1893 – Adolph Lowe, German sociologist and economist (died 1995)
- 1894 – Charles Corm, Lebanese businessman and philanthropist (died 1963)
- 1895 – Milt Gross, American animator, director, and screenwriter (died 1953)
- 1896 – Kai Holm, Danish actor and director (died 1985)
- 1897 – Lefty O'Doul, American baseball player and manager (died 1969)
- 1898 – Georges Dumézil, French philologist and academic (died 1986)
- 1898 – Hans Krebs, German general (died 1945)
- 1899 – Peter Illing, Austrian born, British film and television actor (died 1966)
- 1899 – Emilio Prados, Spanish poet and author (died 1962)
- 1900 – Herbert Biberman, American director and screenwriter (died 1971)

=== 1901–present ===
- 1901 – Wilbur R. Franks, Canadian scientist, invented the g-suit (died 1986)
- 1901 – Charles Goren, American bridge player and author (died 1991)
- 1901 – Jean-Joseph Rabearivelo, Malagasy-French author, poet, and playwright (died 1937)
- 1902 – Rachel Messerer, Lithuanian-Russian actress (died 1993)
- 1902 – Russell Reeder, American soldier and author (died 1998)
- 1903 – William C. Boyd, American immunologist and chemist (died 1983)
- 1903 – Malcolm Dole, American chemist and academic (died 1990)
- 1903 – Dorothy Mackaill, English-American actress and singer (died 1990)
- 1903 – John Scarne, American magician and author (died 1985)
- 1904 – Luis Carrero Blanco, Spanish admiral and politician, 69th President of the Government of Spain (died 1973)
- 1904 – George Gamow, Ukrainian-American physicist and cosmologist (died 1968)
- 1904 – Bahrija Nuri Hadžić, Bosnian opera singer (died 1993)
- 1904 – Joseph Schmidt, Austrian-Hungarian tenor and actor (died 1942)
- 1906 – Meindert DeJong, Dutch-American soldier and author (died 1991)
- 1906 – Avery Fisher, American violinist and engineer, founded Fisher Electronics (died 1994)
- 1906 – Georges Ronsse, Belgian cyclist and manager (died 1969)
- 1907 – Edgar Barrier, American actor (died 1964)
- 1907 – Maria Branyas, American-Spanish supercentenarian (died 2024)
- 1908 – T. R. M. Howard, American surgeon and activist (died 1976)
- 1908 – Thomas Shaw, American singer and guitarist (died 1977)
- 1909 – Harry Helmsley, American businessman (died 1997)
- 1909 – George Edward Holbrook, American chemist and engineer (died 1987)
- 1910 – Tancredo Neves, Brazilian lawyer and politician, Prime Minister of Brazil (died 1985)
- 1911 – Charles Greville, 7th Earl of Warwick, English actor (died 1984)
- 1912 – Afro Basaldella, Italian painter and academic (died 1976)
- 1912 – Ferdinand Leitner, German conductor and composer (died 1996)
- 1912 – Carl Marzani, Italian-American activist and publisher (died 1994)
- 1913 – Taos Amrouche, Algerian singer and author (died 1976)
- 1913 – John Garfield, American actor and singer (died 1952)
- 1914 – Barbara Newhall Follett, American author (died 1939)
- 1914 – Ward Kimball, American animator, producer, and screenwriter (died 2002)
- 1914 – Robert R. Wilson, American physicist, sculptor, and architect (died 2000)
- 1915 – László Csatáry, Hungarian art dealer (died 2013)
- 1915 – Frank Sleeman, Australian lieutenant and politician, Lord Mayor of Brisbane (died 2000)
- 1915 – Carlos Surinach, Spanish-Catalan composer and conductor (died 1997)
- 1916 – William Alland, American actor, director, and producer (died 1997)
- 1916 – Giorgio Bassani, Italian author and poet (died 2000)
- 1916 – Hans Eysenck, German-English psychologist and theorist (died 1997)
- 1916 – Ernest Titterton, English-Australian nuclear physicist (died 1990)
- 1917 – Clyde McCullough, American baseball player, coach, and manager (died 1982)
- 1918 – Kurt Dahlmann, German pilot, lawyer, and journalist (died 2017)
- 1918 – Margaret Osborne duPont, American tennis player (died 2012)
- 1919 – Buck Baker, American race car driver (died 2002)
- 1919 – Tan Chee Khoon, Malaysian physician and politician (died 1996)
- 1920 – Jean Lecanuet, French politician, French Minister of Justice (died 1993)
- 1920 – Alan MacNaughtan, Scottish-English actor (died 2002)
- 1921 – Halim El-Dabh, Egyptian-American composer and educator (died 2017)
- 1921 – Joan Greenwood, English actress (died 1987)
- 1921 – Dinny Pails, English-Australian tennis player (died 1986)
- 1922 – Richard E. Cunha, American director and cinematographer (died 2005)
- 1922 – Dina Pathak, Indian actor and director (died 2002)
- 1923 – Russell Freeburg, American journalist and author
- 1923 – Francis King, English author and poet (died 2011)
- 1923 – Patrick Moore, English astronomer and television host (died 2012)
- 1924 – Kenneth O'Donnell, American soldier and politician (died 1977)
- 1925 – Alan R. Battersby, English chemist and academic (died 2018)
- 1925 – Paul Mauriat, French conductor and composer (died 2006)
- 1926 – Henri de Contenson, French archaeologist and academic (died 2019)
- 1926 – Prince Michel of Bourbon-Parma, French businessman, soldier and racing driver (died 2018)
- 1926 – Richard DeVos, American businessman and philanthropist, co-founded Amway (died 2018)
- 1926 – Pascual Pérez, Argentinian boxer (died 1977)
- 1926 – Don Rendell, English saxophonist and flute player (died 2015)
- 1927 – Phil Batt, American soldier and politician, 29th Governor of Idaho (died 2023)
- 1927 – Thayer David, American actor (died 1978)
- 1927 – Jacques Dupin, French poet and critic (died 2012)
- 1927 – Dick Savitt, American tennis player and businessman (died 2023)
- 1928 – Samuel Adler, German-American composer and conductor
- 1928 – Alan Sillitoe, English novelist, short story writer, essayist, and poet (died 2010)
- 1929 – Bernard Haitink, Dutch violinist and conductor (died 2021)
- 1929 – Peter Swerling, American theoretician and engineer (died 2000)
- 1931 – Wally Bruner, American journalist and television host (died 1997)
- 1931 – Bob Johnson, American ice hockey player and coach (died 1991)
- 1931 – William Henry Keeler, American cardinal (died 2017)
- 1931 – Alice Rivlin, American economist and politician (died 2019)
- 1932 – Sigurd Jansen, Norwegian pianist, composer, and conductor
- 1932 – Ryszard Kapuściński, Polish journalist, photographer, and poet (died 2007)
- 1932 – Miriam Makeba, South African singer-songwriter and actress (died 2008)
- 1932 – Ed Roth, American illustrator (died 2001)
- 1932 – Frank Wells, American businessman (died 1994)
- 1933 – Nino Vaccarella, Italian racing driver (died 2021)
- 1934 – Mario Davidovsky, Argentinian-American composer and academic (died 2019)
- 1934 – John Duffey, American singer-songwriter and mandolinist (died 1996)
- 1934 – Anne Haney, American actress (died 2001)
- 1934 – Barbara McNair, American singer and actress (died 2007)
- 1934 – Sandra Reynolds, South African tennis player
- 1934 – Janez Strnad, Slovenian physicist and academic (died 2015)
- 1935 – Edward Dębicki, Ukrainian-Polish poet and composer
- 1935 – Bent Larsen, Danish chess player and author (died 2010)
- 1936 – Eric Allandale, Dominican trombonist and songwriter (died 2001)
- 1936 – Jim Clark, Scottish racing driver (died 1968)
- 1936 – Aribert Reimann, German pianist and composer (died 2024)
- 1937 – José Araquistáin, Spanish footballer (died 2025)
- 1937 – William Deverell, Canadian lawyer, author, and activist
- 1937 – Graham Dowling, New Zealand cricketer
- 1937 – Leslie H. Gelb, American journalist and author (died 2019)
- 1937 – Yuri Senkevich, Russian physician and explorer (died 2003)
- 1937 – Barney Wilen, French saxophonist and composer (died 1996)
- 1937 – Richard B. Wright, Canadian journalist and author (died 2017)
- 1938 – Anton Balasingham, Sri Lankan-English negotiator (died 2006)
- 1938 – Alpha Condé, Guinean politician, President of Guinea
- 1938 – Allan Kornblum, American police officer and judge (died 2010)
- 1938 – Don Perkins, American football player and sportscaster (died 2022)
- 1938 – Paula Prentiss, American actress
- 1938 – Adam Daniel Rotfeld, Polish academic and politician, Polish Minister of Foreign Affairs
- 1939 – Jack Fisher, American baseball player
- 1939 – Robert Shaye, American film producer
- 1940 – Wolfgang Hoffmann-Riem, German scholar and judge
- 1940 – David Plante, American novelist
- 1941 – John Hancock, American film and television actor (died 1992)
- 1941 – Adrian Lyne, English director, producer, and screenwriter
- 1941 – James Zagel, American lawyer and judge (died 2023)
- 1942 – Gloria Gaither, American singer-songwriter
- 1942 – Charles C. Krulak, American general
- 1942 – David Matthews, American keyboard player and composer
- 1942 – Lynn Sherr, American journalist and author
- 1942 – James Gustave Speth, American lawyer and politician
- 1942 – Zorán Sztevanovity, Serbian-Hungarian singer-songwriter and guitarist
- 1943 – Lucio Dalla, Italian singer-songwriter and actor (died 2012)
- 1943 – Aldo Rico, Argentinian commander and politician
- 1944 – Harvey Postlethwaite, English engineer (died 1999)
- 1944 – Anthony Ichiro Sanda, Japanese-American physicist and academic
- 1944 – Len Walker, English footballer and manager
- 1944 – Bobby Womack, American singer-songwriter (died 2014)
- 1945 – Dieter Meier, Swiss musician
- 1945 – Tommy Svensson, Swedish footballer and manager
- 1945 – Gary Williams, American basketball player and coach
- 1946 – Michael Ashcroft, English businessman and politician
- 1946 – Danny Frisella, American baseball player (died 1977)
- 1946 – Haile Gerima, Ethiopian born US filmmaker
- 1946 – Patricia Kennealy-Morrison, American journalist and author (died 2021)
- 1947 – David Franzoni, American screenwriter and film producer
- 1947 – Jan Garbarek, Norwegian saxophonist and composer
- 1947 – Bob Lewis, American guitarist
- 1947 – Pēteris Plakidis, Latvian pianist and composer (died 2017)
- 1948 – Lindy Chamberlain-Creighton, New Zealand-Australian author
- 1948 – James Ellroy, American writer
- 1948 – Tom Grieve, American baseball player, manager, and sportscaster
- 1948 – Mike Moran, English musician, songwriter and record producer
- 1948 – Jean O'Leary, American nun and activist (died 2005)
- 1948 – Chris Squire, English singer-songwriter and bass guitarist (died 2015)
- 1948 – Shakin' Stevens, British singer-songwriter
- 1949 – Sergei Bagapsh, Abkhazian politician, 2nd President of Abkhazia (died 2011)
- 1949 – Carroll Baker, Canadian singer-songwriter
- 1950 – Ofelia Medina, Mexican actress and screenwriter
- 1950 – Rick Perry, American captain and politician, 47th Governor of Texas
- 1950 – Safet Plakalo, Bosnian author and playwright (died 2015)
- 1951 – Edelgard Bulmahn, German educator and politician, German Federal Minister of Education and Research
- 1951 – Theresa Hak Kyung Cha, South Korean-American author, director, and producer (died 1982)
- 1951 – Kenny Dalglish, Scottish footballer and manager
- 1951 – Pete Haycock, English singer-songwriter and guitarist (died 2013)
- 1951 – Peter O'Sullivan, Welsh footballer
- 1951 – Sam Perlozzo, American baseball player and manager
- 1951 – Chris Rea, English singer-songwriter and guitarist (died 2025)
- 1951 – Glenis Willmott, English scientist and politician
- 1951 – Zoran Žižić, Montenegrin politician, 4th Prime Minister of the Federal Republic of Yugoslavia (died 2013)
- 1952 – Peter Kuhfeld, English painter
- 1952 – Ronn Moss, American singer-songwriter and actor
- 1952 – Svend Robinson, American-Canadian lawyer and politician
- 1952 – Umberto Tozzi, Italian singer-songwriter and producer
- 1953 – John Edwards, Australian director and producer
- 1953 – Emilio Estefan, Cuban-American musician and producer
- 1953 – Paweł Janas, Polish footballer and manager
- 1953 – Kay Lenz, American actress
- 1953 – Reinhold Roth, German motorcycle racer (died 2021)
- 1953 – Chris Smith, American lawyer and politician
- 1953 – Agustí Villaronga, Spanish actor, director, and screenwriter (died 2023)
- 1953 – Daniel Woodrell, American novelist and short story writer (died 2025)
- 1954 – Timur Apakidze, Russian general and pilot (died 2001)
- 1954 – François Fillon, French lawyer and politician, Prime Minister of France
- 1954 – Peter Jacobsen, American golfer and sportscaster
- 1954 – Catherine O'Hara, Canadian-American actress and comedian (died 2026)
- 1954 – Irina Ratushinskaya, Russian poet and author (died 2017)
- 1955 – Tim Costello, Australian minister and politician
- 1955 – Joey Jones, Welsh footballer and manager
- 1957 – Nicholas Coleridge, English journalist and businessman
- 1957 – Mykelti Williamson, American actor and director
- 1958 – Patricia Heaton, American actress
- 1958 – Tina Smith, American politician
- 1959 – Rick Ardon, Australian journalist
- 1959 – Plamen Getov, Bulgarian footballer
- 1960 – Chonda Pierce, American comedian
- 1961 – Ray Mancini, American boxer
- 1961 – Steven Weber, American actor and comedian
- 1961 – Roger Wessels, South African golfer and educator
- 1963 – Jason Newsted, American musician and songwriter
- 1964 – Brian Crowley, Irish lawyer and politician
- 1964 – Paolo Virzì, Italian director and screenwriter
- 1965 – Paul W. S. Anderson, English director, producer, and screenwriter
- 1965 – Stacy Edwards, American actress
- 1965 – Khaled Hosseini, Afghan-American novelist
- 1965 – Yury Lonchakov, Russian pilot, and cosmonaut
- 1966 – Emese Hunyady, Hungarian speed skater
- 1966 – Kevin Johnson, American basketball player and politician, 55th Mayor of Sacramento
- 1966 – Fiona Ma, American accountant and politician
- 1966 – Helmut Mayer, Austrian skier
- 1966 – Dav Pilkey, American author and illustrator
- 1966 – Grand Puba, American rapper
- 1966 – Mike Small, American golfer and coach
- 1967 – Daryll Cullinan, South African cricketer and coach
- 1967 – Evan Dando, American singer-songwriter and guitarist
- 1967 – Ivan Lewis, English lawyer and politician, Shadow Secretary of State for Northern Ireland
- 1967 – Dave Rayner, English cyclist (died 1994)
- 1967 – Sam Taylor-Johnson, English filmmaker and photographer
- 1967 – Kubilay Türkyilmaz, Swiss footballer
- 1967 – Tim Vine, English comedian, actor, and author
- 1968 – Giovanni Carrara, Venezuelan baseball player
- 1968 – Jorge Celedón, Colombian singer
- 1968 – Patsy Kensit, English model and actress
- 1968 – Kyriakos Mitsotakis, Greek banker and politician, Prime Minister of Greece
- 1968 – Graham Westley, English footballer and manager
- 1969 – Chaz Bono, American writer, musician, and actor
- 1969 – Pierluigi Casiraghi, Italian footballer and manager
- 1969 – Wayne Collins, English footballer
- 1969 – Annie Yi, Taiwanese singer, actress, and writer
- 1970 – Andrea Bendewald, American actress
- 1970 – Àlex Crivillé, Spanish motorcycle racer
- 1970 – Will Keen, English actor
- 1970 – Caroline Vis, Dutch tennis player
- 1971 – Iain Baird, Canadian soccer player and manager
- 1971 – Claire Baker, Scottish politician
- 1971 – Anders Kjølholm, Danish bass player
- 1971 – Satoshi Motoyama, Japanese racing driver
- 1972 – Katherine Center, American journalist and author
- 1972 – Nocturno Culto, Norwegian singer-songwriter and guitarist
- 1972 – Robert Smith, American football player and sportscaster
- 1972 – Ivy Queen, Puerto Rican singer, songwriter, rapper, actress and record producer
- 1972 – Jos Verstappen, Dutch racing driver
- 1972 – Alison Wheeler, English singer-songwriter
- 1973 – Massimo Brambilla, Italian footballer and coach
- 1973 – Phillip Daniels, American football player and coach
- 1973 – Valery Kobelev, Russian ski jumper
- 1973 – Linus of Hollywood, American singer-songwriter and producer
- 1973 – Penny Mordaunt, English lieutenant and politician, Leader of the House of Commons and Lord President of the Council
- 1973 – Len Wiseman, American director, producer, and screenwriter
- 1973 – Chandra Sekhar Yeleti, Indian director and screenwriter
- 1973 – Casimiro Ynares III, Filipino politician
- 1974 – Crowbar, American wrestler
- 1974 – Mladen Krstajić, Serbian footballer and manager
- 1974 – Karol Kučera, Slovak tennis player
- 1974 – Ariel Ortega, Argentinian footballer
- 1974 – Tommy Phelps, South Korean-American baseball player and coach
- 1974 – ICS Vortex, Norwegian singer-songwriter and guitarist
- 1974 – David Wagner, American tennis player and educator
- 1974 – Bill Young, Australian rugby player
- 1975 – Antti Aalto, Finnish ice hockey player
- 1975 – Mats Eilertsen, Norwegian bassist and composer
- 1975 – Patrick Femerling, German basketball player
- 1975 – Kristi Harrower, Australian basketball player
- 1975 – Hawksley Workman, Canadian singer-songwriter and guitarist
- 1976 – Robbie Blake, English footballer
- 1976 – Tommy Jönsson, Swedish footballer
- 1977 – Nacho Figueras, Argentinian polo player and model
- 1977 – Traver Rains, American fashion designer and photographer
- 1978 – Pierre Dagenais, Canadian ice hockey player
- 1978 – Jean-Marc Pelletier, American ice hockey player
- 1979 – Trenton Hassell, American basketball player
- 1979 – Sarah Stock, Canadian wrestler and trainer
- 1980 – Rohan Bopanna, Indian tennis player
- 1980 – Omar Bravo, Mexican footballer
- 1980 – Suzanna Choffel, American singer-songwriter
- 1980 – Alex Garcia, Brazilian basketball player
- 1980 – Giedrius Gustas, Lithuanian basketball player
- 1980 – Scott Hamilton, New Zealand rugby player and coach
- 1980 – Jack Hannahan, American baseball player
- 1980 – Michael Henrich, American ice hockey player
- 1980 – Phil McGuire, Scottish footballer and manager
- 1980 – Aja Volkman, American singer-songwriter
- 1981 – Ariza Makukula, Portuguese footballer
- 1981 – Helen Wyman, English cyclist
- 1982 – Landon Donovan, American soccer player and coach
- 1982 – Cate Edwards, American lawyer and author
- 1982 – Ludmila Ezhova, Russian gymnast
- 1982 – K. Michelle, American singer
- 1982 – Yasemin Mori, Turkish singer
- 1983 – Samuel Contesti, French-Italian figure skater
- 1983 – Adam Deacon, English film actor, rapper, writer and director
- 1983 – Jaque Fourie, South African rugby player
- 1983 – Drew Houston, American entrepreneur
- 1983 – Sergio Romo, American baseball player
- 1984 – Tamir Cohen, Israeli footballer
- 1984 – Anders Grøndal, Norwegian racing driver
- 1984 – Spencer Larsen, American football player
- 1984 – Jeremy Loops, South African singer-songwriter and record producer
- 1984 – Raven Quinn, American singer-songwriter
- 1984 – Zak Whitbread, American-English footballer
- 1985 – Jake Buxton, English footballer
- 1985 – Scott Michael Foster, American actor
- 1985 – Whitney Port, American fashion designer and author
- 1986 – Steven Burke, English road and track cyclist
- 1986 – Tom De Mul, Belgian footballer
- 1986 – Margo Harshman, American actress
- 1986 – Mike Krieger, Brazilian-American computer programmer and businessman, co-founded Instagram
- 1986 – Park Min-young, South Korean actress
- 1986 – Siim Roops, Estonian footballer
- 1986 – Bohdan Shust, Ukrainian footballer
- 1987 – Ben McKinley, Australian footballer
- 1987 – Tamzin Merchant, English actress
- 1987 – Cameron Wood, Australian footballer
- 1988 – Josh Bowman, English actor
- 1988 – Gal Mekel, Israeli basketball player
- 1988 – Laura Siegemund, German tennis player
- 1988 – Adam Watts, English footballer
- 1989 – Benjamin Kiplagat, Ugandan long-distance runner (died 2023)
- 1990 – Andrea Bowen, American actress
- 1990 – Draymond Green, American basketball player
- 1990 – Paddy Madden, Irish footballer
- 1990 – Fran Mérida, Spanish footballer
- 1992 – Nick Castellanos, American baseball player
- 1992 – Erik Lamela, Argentine footballer
- 1992 – Bernd Leno, German footballer
- 1992 – Karl Mööl, Estonian footballer
- 1992 – Jared Sullinger, American basketball player
- 1993 – Jenna Boyd, American actress
- 1993 – Bobbi Kristina Brown, American singer and actress (died 2015)
- 1993 – Richard Peniket, English footballer
- 1994 – Callum Harriott, English footballer
- 1994 – Luisito Pié, Dominican taekwondo athlete
- 1994 – AJ Tracey, British rapper and record producer
- 1995 – Chlöe Howl, English singer-songwriter
- 1995 – Bill Milner, English actor
- 1995 – Valeri Nichushkin, Russian ice hockey player
- 1996 – Michael Gallup, American football player
- 1996 – Antonio Sanabria, Paraguayan footballer
- 1996 – Lukas Webb, Australian rules footballer
- 1997 – Matisse Thybulle, Australian-American basketball player
- 1997 – Kwon Hyun-bin, South Korean actor and singer
- 1998 – Obi Toppin, American basketball player
- 1999 – Brooklyn Beckham, English model and socialite
- 2001 – Freya Anderson, English freestyle swimmer
- 2001 – George Pickens, American football player
- 2002 – Jacob Hopkins, American actor
- 2002 – Alexandra Kiroi-Bogatyreva, Australian rhythmic gymnast
- 2007 – Miya Cech, American actress

== Deaths ==
=== Pre-1600 ===
- 306 – Adrian and Natalia of Nicomedia, Christian martyrs
- 480 – Landry of Sées, French bishop and saint
- 561 – Pelagius I, pope of the Catholic Church
- 934 – Abdullah al-Mahdi Billah, Fatimid caliph (born 873)
- 1172 – Stephen III, king of Hungary (born 1147)
- 1193 – Saladin, founder of the Ayyubid Sultanate (born 1137)
- 1238 – Joan of England, queen of Scotland (born 1210)
- 1238 – Yuri II, Russian Grand Prince (born 1189)
- 1303 – Daniel of Moscow, Russian Grand Duke (born 1261)
- 1314 – Jakub Świnka, Polish priest and archbishop
- 1371 – Jeanne d'Évreux, queen consort of France (born 1310)
- 1388 – Thomas Usk, English author
- 1484 – Saint Casimir, Polish prince (born 1458)
- 1496 – Sigismund, archduke of Austria (born 1427)
- 1556 – Leonhard Kleber, German organist (born 1495)
- 1583 – Bernard Gilpin, English priest and theologian (born 1517)

=== 1601–1900 ===
- 1604 – Fausto Sozzini, Italian theologian and educator (born 1539)
- 1615 – Hans von Aachen, German painter and educator (born 1552)
- 1710 – Louis III, duke of Bourbon (born 1668)
- 1733 – Claude de Forbin, French admiral and politician (born 1656)
- 1744 – John Anstis, English historian and politician (born 1669)
- 1762 – Johannes Zick, German painter (born 1702)
- 1793 – Louis Jean Marie de Bourbon, Duke of Penthièvre (born 1725)
- 1795 – John Collins, American politician, 3rd governor of Rhode Island (born 1717)
- 1805 – Jean-Baptiste Greuze, French painter (born 1725)
- 1807 – Abraham Baldwin, American minister, lawyer, and politician (born 1754)
- 1811 – Mariano Moreno, Argentinian journalist, lawyer, and politician (born 1778)
- 1832 – Jean-François Champollion, French philologist and scholar (born 1790)
- 1851 – James Richardson, English explorer (born 1809)
- 1852 – Nikolai Gogol, Ukrainian-Russian short story writer, novelist, and playwright (born 1809)
- 1853 – Thomas Bladen Capel, English admiral (born 1776)
- 1853 – Christian Leopold von Buch, German geologist and paleontologist (born 1774)
- 1858 – Matthew C. Perry, American naval commander (born 1794)
- 1864 – Thomas Starr King, American minister and politician (born 1824)
- 1866 – Alexander Campbell, Irish-American minister and theologian (born 1788)
- 1872 – Carsten Hauch, Danish poet and playwright (born 1790)
- 1883 – Alexander H. Stephens, American lawyer and politician, Vice President of the Confederate States of America (born 1812)
- 1888 – Amos Bronson Alcott, American philosopher and educator (born 1799)

=== 1901–present ===
- 1903 – Joseph Henry Shorthouse, English author (born 1834)
- 1906 – John Schofield, American general and politician, 28th United States Secretary of War (born 1831)
- 1915 – William Willett, English inventor, founded British Summer Time (born 1856)
- 1916 – Franz Marc, German painter (born 1880)
- 1925 – Moritz Moszkowski, Polish-German pianist and composer (born 1854)
- 1925 – James Ward, English psychologist and philosopher (born 1843)
- 1925 – John Montgomery Ward, American baseball player and manager (born 1860)
- 1927 – Ira Remsen, American chemist and academic (born 1846)
- 1938 – George Foster Peabody, American banker and philanthropist (born 1852)
- 1938 – Jack Taylor, American baseball player (born 1874)
- 1940 – Hamlin Garland, American novelist, poet, essayist, and short story writer (born 1860)
- 1941 – Ludwig Quidde, German activist and politician, Nobel Prize laureate (born 1858)
- 1944 – Fannie Barrier Williams, American educator and activist (born 1855)
- 1944 – Louis Buchalter, American mob boss (born 1897)
- 1944 – Louis Capone, Italian-American gangster (born 1896)
- 1944 – René Lefebvre, French businessman (born 1879)
- 1945 – Lucille La Verne, American actress (born 1872)
- 1945 – Mark Sandrich, American director, producer, and screenwriter (born 1900)
- 1948 – Antonin Artaud, French actor and director (born 1896)
- 1949 – Clarence Kingsbury, English cyclist (born 1882)
- 1952 – Charles Scott Sherrington, English neurophysiologist and pathologist, Nobel Prize laureate (born 1857)
- 1954 – Noel Gay, English composer and songwriter (born 1898)
- 1960 – Herbert O'Conor, American soldier, lawyer, and politician, 51st Governor of Maryland (born 1896)
- 1963 – William Carlos Williams, American poet, short story writer, and essayist (born 1883)
- 1969 – Nicholas Schenck, Russian-American businessman (born 1881)
- 1972 – Harold Barrowclough, New Zealand general, lawyer, and politician, 8th Chief Justice of New Zealand (born 1894)
- 1972 – Charles Biro, American author and illustrator (born 1911)
- 1974 – Adolph Gottlieb, American painter and sculptor (born 1903)
- 1976 – John Marvin Jones, American judge and politician (born 1882)
- 1976 – Walter H. Schottky, Swiss-German physicist and engineer (born 1886)
- 1977 – Anatol E. Baconsky, Romanian poet, author, and critic (born 1925)
- 1977 – Nancy Tyson Burbidge, Australian botanist and curator (born 1912)
- 1977 – Andrés Caicedo, Colombian author, poet, and playwright (born 1951)
- 1977 – William Paul, American lawyer and politician (born 1885)
- 1977 – Lutz Graf Schwerin von Krosigk, German jurist and politician, German Minister for Foreign Affairs (born 1887)
- 1978 – Wesley Bolin, American businessman and politician, 15th Governor of Arizona (born 1909)
- 1978 – Joe Marsala, American clarinet player and songwriter (born 1907)
- 1979 – Willi Unsoeld, American mountaineer and educator (born 1926)
- 1980 – Alan Hardaker, English lieutenant and businessman (born 1912)
- 1981 – Torin Thatcher, American actor (born 1905)
- 1981 – Karl-Jesko von Puttkamer, German admiral (born 1900)
- 1986 – Ding Ling, Chinese feminist and socialist realist author (born 1904)
- 1986 – Albert L. Lehninger, American biochemist and academic (born 1917)
- 1986 – Richard Manuel, Canadian singer-songwriter and pianist (born 1943)
- 1986 – Elizabeth Smart, Canadian poet and author (born 1913)
- 1987 – Seibo Kitamura, Japanese sculptor (born 1884)
- 1988 – Beatriz Guido, Argentine author and screenwriter (born 1924)
- 1989 – Tiny Grimes, American guitarist (born 1916)
- 1990 – Hank Gathers, American basketball player (born 1967)
- 1991 – Godfrey Bryan, English cricketer (born 1902)
- 1992 – Art Babbitt, American animator and director (born 1907)
- 1992 – Pare Lorentz, American director, producer, and screenwriter (born 1905)
- 1993 – Art Hodes, Ukrainian-American pianist and composer (born 1904)
- 1993 – Tomislav Ivčić, Croatian singer-songwriter and politician (born 1953)
- 1993 – Izaak Kolthoff, Dutch chemist and academic (born 1894)
- 1993 – Nicholas Ridley, Baron Ridley of Liddesdale, English lieutenant and politician, Secretary of State for the Environment (born 1929)
- 1994 – John Candy, Canadian comedian and actor (born 1950)
- 1994 – George Edward Hughes, Irish-Scottish philosopher and author (born 1918)
- 1995 – Matt Urban, American colonel, Medal of Honor recipient (born 1919)
- 1996 – Minnie Pearl, American entertainer (born 1912)
- 1996 – John Sauer, American football player, coach, and sportscaster (born 1925)
- 1997 – Joe Baker-Cresswell, English captain (born 1901)
- 1997 – Robert H. Dicke, American physicist and astronomer (born 1916)
- 1998 – Ivan Dougherty, Australian general (born 1907)
- 1999 – Harry Blackmun, American lawyer and judge (born 1908)
- 1999 – Del Close, American actor and educator (born 1934)
- 1999 – Miłosz Magin, Polish pianist and composer (born 1929)
- 2000 – Hermann Brück, German-Scottish physicist and astronomer (born 1905)
- 2000 – Michael Noonan, New Zealand-Australian author and screenwriter (born 1921)
- 2000 – Ta-You Wu, Chinese physicist and academic (born 1907)
- 2001 – Gerardo Barbero, Argentinian chess player (born 1961)
- 2001 – Jean René Bazaine, French painter and author (born 1904)
- 2001 – Fred Lasswell, American cartoonist (born 1916)
- 2001 – Jim Rhodes, American businessman and politician, 61st Governor of Ohio (born 1909)
- 2001 – Harold Stassen, American educator and politician, 25th Governor of Minnesota (born 1907)
- 2002 – Ugnė Karvelis, Lithuanian author and translator (born 1935)
- 2002 – Elyne Mitchell, Australian skier and author (born 1913)
- 2002 – Velibor Vasović, Serbian footballer and manager (born 1939)
- 2003 – Jaba Ioseliani, Georgian playwright, academic, and politician (born 1926)
- 2003 – Sébastien Japrisot, French author, screenwriter, and director (born 1931)
- 2004 – Claude Nougaro, French singer-songwriter (born 1929)
- 2005 – Nicola Calipari, Italian general (born 1953)
- 2005 – Yuriy Kravchenko, Ukrainian police officer and politician (born 1951)
- 2005 – Carlos Sherman, Uruguayan-Belarusian author and activist (born 1934)
- 2006 – John Reynolds Gardiner, American author and engineer (born 1944)
- 2006 – Edgar Valter, Estonian author and illustrator (born 1929)
- 2007 – Thomas Eagleton, American lawyer and politician, 38th Lieutenant Governor of Missouri (born 1929)
- 2007 – Tadeusz Nalepa, Polish singer-songwriter and guitarist (born 1934)
- 2007 – Ian Wooldridge, English journalist (born 1932)
- 2008 – Gary Gygax, American game designer, co-created Dungeons & Dragons (born 1938)
- 2008 – Leonard Rosenman, American composer and conductor (born 1924)
- 2009 – Yvon Cormier, Canadian wrestler (born 1938)
- 2009 – Horton Foote, American playwright and screenwriter (born 1916)
- 2009 – George McAfee, American football player (born 1918)
- 2010 – Raimund Abraham, Austrian architect and educator, designed the Austrian Cultural Forum New York (born 1933)
- 2010 – Johnny Alf, Brazilian pianist and composer (born 1929)
- 2010 – Vladislav Ardzinba, Abkhazian historian and politician, 1st President of Abkhazia (born 1945)
- 2010 – Fred Wedlock, English singer-songwriter and guitarist (born 1942)
- 2011 – Krishna Prasad Bhattarai, Nepalese journalist and politician, 29th Prime Minister of Nepal (born 1924)
- 2011 – Vivienne Harris, English journalist and publisher, co-founded the Jewish Telegraph (born 1921)
- 2011 – Ed Manning, American basketball player and coach (born 1943)
- 2011 – Arjun Singh, Indian politician (born 1930)
- 2011 – Alenush Terian, Iranian astronomer and physicist (born 1920)
- 2011 – Simon van der Meer, Dutch-Swiss physicist and academic, Nobel Prize laureate (born 1925)
- 2012 – Paul McBride, Scottish lawyer and politician (born 1965)
- 2012 – Don Mincher, American baseball player (born 1938)
- 2013 – Lillian Cahn, Hungarian-American businesswoman, co-founded Coach, Inc. (born 1923)
- 2013 – Mickey Moore, Canadian-American actor and director (born 1914)
- 2013 – Toren Smith, Canadian businessman, founded Studio Proteus (born 1960)
- 2014 – Mark Freidkin, Russian author and poet (born 1953)
- 2014 – Elaine Kellett-Bowman, English lawyer and politician (born 1923)
- 2014 – Jack Kinzler, American engineer (born 1920)
- 2014 – Wu Tianming, Chinese director and producer (born 1939)
- 2015 – Dušan Bilandžić, Croatian historian and politician (born 1924)
- 2015 – Ray Hatton, English-American runner, author, and academic (born 1932)
- 2016 – Bud Collins, American journalist and sportscaster (born 1929)
- 2016 – Pat Conroy, American author (born 1945)
- 2016 – P. A. Sangma, Indian lawyer and politician, Speaker of the Lok Sabha (born 1947)
- 2016 – Zhou Xiaoyan, Chinese soprano and educator (born 1917)
- 2017 – Clayton Yeutter, American politician (born 1930)
- 2018 – Davide Astori, Italian soccer player (born 1987)
- 2019 – Keith Flint, English singer (The Prodigy) (born 1969)
- 2019 – Luke Perry, American actor (born 1966)
- 2020 – Javier Pérez de Cuéllar, Peruvian politician and diplomat (born 1920)
- 2022 – Rod Marsh, Australian cricketer and coach (born 1947)
- 2022 – Shane Warne, Australian cricketer, coach, and sportscaster (born 1969)
- 2023 – Phil Batt, American soldier and politician, 29th Governor of Idaho (born 1927)
- 2025 – Roy Ayers, American singer-songwriter, keyboard player, vibraphonist, and producer (born 1940)
- 2025 – Joe Nickell, American skeptic and investigator of the paranormal (born 1944)

== Holidays and observances ==
- Christian feast day:
  - Adrian of Nicomedia
  - Casimir
  - Felix of Rhuys
  - Giovanni Antonio Farina (Catholic Church)
  - Blessed Humbert III, Count of Savoy (Roman Catholic Church)
  - Paul Cuffee (Episcopal Church)
  - Peter of Pappacarbone
  - Blessed Placide Viel
  - Blessed Zoltán Meszlényi
  - March 4 (Eastern Orthodox liturgics)
- St Casimir's Day (Poland and Lithuania)
- World Obesity Day
- World Engineering Day for Sustainable Development
