= Wooster Lake =

- Location within Illinois
- Location: Lake County, Illinois
- Coordinates: 42.365°N 88.149°W
- Type: lake
- Primary outflows: Fish Lake Drain
- Surface area: 98.9 acres (40.0 ha)
- Average depth: 16.3 feet (5.0 m)
- Max. depth: 29.8 feet (9.1 m)
- Shore length^{1}: 2.03 miles (3.27 km)
- ^{1} Shore length is not a well-defined measure.

Wooster Lake is a lake in Lake County, Illinois, United States. It is located near Illinois Route 134 and Wilson Road, predominantly in unincorporated Ingleside, northeast of the Village of Volo, northwest of the Village of Round Lake, and southeast of the Village of Fox Lake.

== Characteristics ==
The Lakes Management Unit of the Lake County Health Department provided a 2003 Summary of Wooster Lake describing Wooster as a glacially-formed, non-public (private) lake encompassing approximately 98.9 acres (40.0 ha) with a shoreline of 2.03 miles (3.27 km). It is reported to have a 29.8 feet (9.1 m) maximum depth and a 16.3 feet (5.0 m) average depth, the 4th deepest (on average) of the inland, private lakes in Lake County, Illinois. It is part of the Fish Lake drainage of the Fox River watershed. The Fish Lake Drain flows from Fish Lake into Fischer Lake, then into Wooster. Water leaves Wooster by a small creek along the northern shoreline and flows into Duck Lake, eventually draining into the Fox River.

Though the private lake has significant depth, in February 2005, Lakes Management - a division of the Lake County Health Department - provided a slide deck presentation highlighting by month the total phosphorus (TP) levels recorded as spilling into Wooster Lake. During significant rain events (such as in June 2004), 20.5 pounds (9.3 kilograms) of phosphorus per day were recorded as spilling in at just this one measured location.

== History ==
As reported by the Lake County Historical Museum's Diana Dretske, Jacob L. Beilhart founded the communitarian group called the Spirit Fruit Society on the shores of Wooster Lake, after purchasing a 90-acre tract known as the Dahlziel Farm in 1905. About a dozen established members of the Spirit Fruit Society moved with Beilhart to Illinois, along with a few new members. Over the next two years the society built a spacious house and later a large barn entirely by hand. The 2½-story residence had 32 rooms, a full basement, and modern (for the time) conveniences. The dining room accommodated up to 100 people. The society continued to live peacefully in Ingleside for several years. They provided for themselves from what came to be known as the "Spirit Fruit Farm", opened the farm and temple to visitors, and produced a newsletter. Beilhart continued to speak to groups in Chicago promoting the ideals of the society.

In November 1908, Beilhart became ill from acute appendicitis. Despite attention from a surgeon who performed an appendectomy, he developed peritonitis and died three days later. In keeping with the society's beliefs in simplicity, he was buried in a plain coffin in an unmarked grave overlooking Wooster Lake. None of the buildings remain, having been covered by a housing development, although Beilhart's grave remains in a brush-obscured corner of the tract.
