= Zee TV Europe =

ZEE TV Europe
- Logo used since 2025
- Country: United Kingdom
- Broadcast area: Europe
- Headquarters: London, United Kingdom

Programming
- Languages: Hindi; English
- Picture format: 1080p HDTV

Ownership
- Owner: Zee Entertainment Enterprises
- Sister channels: Zee Cinema

History
- Launched: 8 July 1992; 34 years ago

Links
- Website: zeetv.zee5.com

Availability

Streaming media
- ZEE5: SD & HD

ZEE TV Europe, also known as ZEE TV UK, is a British Hindi language general entertainment pay television channel owned by Zee Entertainment Enterprises subsidiary Zee Entertainment UK. It was launched in July 1992 as the European version of TV Asia, an American channel that was founded two years earlier. TV Asia parted ways with its American parent when it was acquired Zee TV and aligned it with the brand, while maintaining its local programmes and subscriber base.

The channel is available throughout Europe on subscription television operators (usually as a premium channel) and on ZEE5. Its programming is delivered in English. As of September 2026, its head is Parul Goel.

== History ==
TV Asia started broadcasting to Europe on 8 July 1992 using the Astra 1D satellite, where it initially broadcast ten hours a day, at a starting cost of £8 million; its director was Sarosh Zaiwalla, while the channel was funded by Indian and Pakistani businessmen, including the head of the Dolphin Group, owner of the American channel of the same name, who was Pakistani. The channel expected 35,000 to 40,000 subscribers in order to break even, which they were expecting to do such in four months. The total potential audience was estimated to be of five million. Programmes were mainly in Hindi and English with occasional segments in other regional languages. It maintained a minuscule news operation, while it received criticism for over-reliance on imported programmes from the Indian subcontinent. A year after launching, it had 50,000 subscribers, then flourishing to "several hundred thousand" by mid-1994. The channel also had local community programming as well as content targeting viewers of different religions (Hinduism, Sikhism, and Islam).

The channel was facing financial problems in 1994. Its parent company, Dolphin Group, was planning in October of that year the launch of a separate general entertainment channel with Yorkshire Television for basic tiers of cable companies, the contents of which were not fully clear. Zee TV, on its behalf, wanted to launch a European channel in March 1995. The quality of its programmes posed a threat to existing South Asian television channels in Europe TV Asia, using Astra's fourth satellite, finally started 24-hour broadcasting, but had its eyes set on taking over the channel. Zee TV took over TV Asia Europe in early January 1995. Its takeover led to the application of the successful formula in India to the South Asian community in Europe, which, in 1995, had over one million people, but was severely fragmented among cultural and linguistic lines. The takeover took place on 3 March 1995. Coinciding with the takeover, in April 1995, it signed a deal with Nethold's Multichoice. As of October 1995, a subscription to Zee TV on British cable cost £24.98, costing even more than Adult Channel (£23.98).

The network produced special programmes for the 1997 United Kingdom general election, the first with candidates of South Asian origin. This included a Labour Party broadcast featuring slogans in English, Urdu, Gujarati, Punjabi and Bengali at the end, and a Liberal Democrats' broadcast largely spoken in Urdu. The target were 36 constituencies where the Asian vote could have an influence in the final result. Later that year, the Independent Television Commission ruled that it was carrying live cricket from India with tobacco advertising, which is restricted under British law. In 1998, the channel launched in Portugal on the TV Cabo platform, but only in Lisbon.

In January 1999, Zee TV planned the launch of its digital bouquet, with the advent of digital television in the UK. The first channel on the pipeline was Music Asia, due for June, while Zee Cinema would "take some time to develop". In February, it was confirmed that Zee Cinema and Zee News would join. That spring, it would branch out into publishing, with the creation of a magazine, Zee Mag.

By the early 2000s, two of its most popular local programmes were Your Zindagi, aimed at viewers in the UK, and Euro Zindagi, aimed at Western Europe. Other programmes included Out and About, a diary of events for the community in the UK, and an imported programme, Public Demand, produced by the main Zee TV channel in Mumbai and with opinions from Zee TV viewers.

An HD feed existed until 2019; it resumed on 13 January 2022. Its advertising sales are handled by Sky Media.

On 3 July 2023, the channel introduced a 90-minute Bengali strand.

== Sister channels ==
=== Zee Cinema ===
The European feed of Zee Cinema is one of Zee TV Europe's two sister channels. In the past, it carried live cricket matches, which its viewers found uncomfortable, as such telecasts disrupted its viewing habits. This was solved in the early 2010s with the launch of Zee Café.

=== &TV ===
&TV shut down in its first incarnation on 1 June 2019 and moved to ZEE5. On 13 November 2024, it relaunched, this time on the Samsung TV Plus platform in the UK, as a FAST channel.

== Former sister channels ==
=== Zee Punjabi ===
Alpha Punjabi, later Zee Punjabi, was the only regional language channel (what was then part of the Alpha Network) to have a UK feed. It started broadcasting on 20 August 2002. Every morning, before regular programming, it aired Gurbani from the Golden Temple in Amritsar. The channel closed on 30 April 2009 as it was unfeasible for the company. Zee Punjabi eventually closed in India on 31 May.

=== Zee Café ===
Zee Café launched in the United Kingdom and Ireland on 15 July 2010, exclusively on the Sky platform. The channel was mainly used as a "hybrid channel" broadcasting content from a variety of Zee TV's channels in India. Entertainment content was mostly regional, coming in from Zee Bangla and Zee Marathi, while news took a substantial amount of its programming, coming from Zee News and Zee Business. Sports telecasts moved here from Zee Cinema and Zing. On 11 September 2012, the channel dropped its encryption and shifted to classics from ZEEL's archives. It closed on 10 June 2013, being replaced by Lamhé.

=== Lamhé ===
Lamhé was essentially a continuation of Zee Café after the September 2012 reformat: free-to-air for Sky subscribers and carrying archived content.

=== Zing ===
Zing used to be available on basic tiers of Sky and Virgin Media. It shut down on 1 June 2019 and moved to ZEE5.

=== Living Foodz ===
Living Foodz shut down on 1 June 2019 and moved to ZEE5.
