= List of people from Franklin County, Kansas =

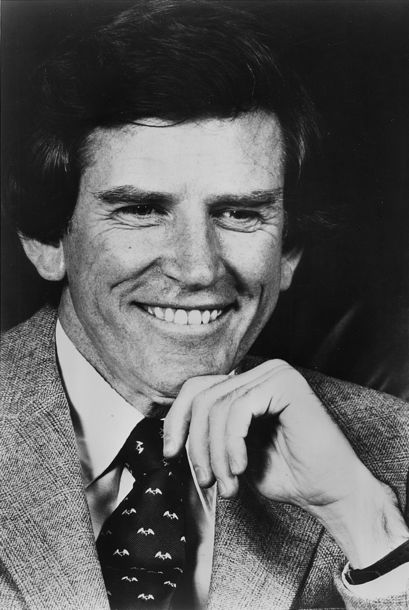
Former United States Senator and 1988 United States Presidential primary candidate Gary Hart grew up in Ottawa, Kansas.

The following is a list of people from Franklin County, Kansas. The area includes the cities of Ottawa, Wellsville, Pomona, and other cities rural areas in the county. Inclusion on the list should be reserved for notable people past and present who have resided in the county, either in cities or rural areas.

== Arts ==
- Don Harrison, former anchor of CNN Headline News
- Stanley Sheldon, bass guitar player
- Chely Wright, country music star and songwriter

== Athletics ==
- Bill Grigsby, former sportscaster for the Kansas City Chiefs
- Steve Grogan, New England Patriots quarterback, 1975-1990
- Kent Kessinger, head football coach of Ottawa Braves
- Lou McEvoy, Major League Baseball pitcher, New York Yankees
- Wade Moore, head football coach Kansas State University, 1901 season
- Jeremy Petty, ARCA Remax Series driver
- Arthur Schabinger, football and basketball player and coach, credited (although disputed) with throwing the first forward pass in college football history
- Willie Ramsdell, Major League baseball pitcher

== Business ==
- Paul Helms, executive in the baking industry; sports philanthropist

== Clergy ==
- Jacob L. Beilhart, founder and leader of a communitarian group known as the Spirit Fruit Society
- John and Edith Kilbuck, Moravian missionaries in southwestern Alaska in the late 19th and early 20th centuries
- Jotham Meeker, missionary and printer who printed over sixty publications in Native American languages

== Politics ==
- Aldamar Elder, member of Kansas House of Representatives
- Peter Percival Elder, sixth Lieutenant Governor of Kansas
- Gary Hart, former presidential candidate
- Kevin Jones, member of Kansas House of Representatives
- Jerry Voorhis, member of United States House of Representatives from California

== Technology ==
- Steven Hawley, Space Shuttle astronaut
- Lloyd Stearman, aviator and aircraft designer
- John G. Thompson, mathematician, winner of 1992 Wolf Prize and 2008 Abel Prize

== See also ==
- Lists of people from Kansas
