= Zee Cinema =

Indian Hindi-language movie channel

ZEE Cinema
- Country: India
- Broadcast area: Worldwide
- Headquarters: Mumbai, Maharashtra, India

Programming
- Language: Hindi
- Picture format: 1080i HDTV (downscaled to letterboxed 576i for the SDTV feed)

Ownership
- Owner: ZEEL
- Parent: Zee Entertainment Network
- Sister channels: See list of channels owned by ZEEL

History
- Launched: April 1995; 31 years ago (India); 2001; 25 years ago (UK); September 2, 2006; 20 years ago (Canada); 2011; 15 years ago (United States); August 8, 2012; 14 years ago (Indonesia)

Availability

Terrestrial
- DVB-T2 (Worldwide): Check local frequencies

Streaming media
- ZEE5 (International): Watch Live
- Jio TV (India): SD & HD
- Tata Play (India): SD & HD

Zee Cinema is an Indian Hindi language movie channel owned by Zee Entertainment Enterprises. It was launched in April 1995 as the first 24-hour movie channel channel in India.

Zee Cinema’s traditional competitors are Sony Max and Star Gold. International versions of the channel also exist.

== History ==
Zee Cinema started broadcasting on 9 April 1995 by Zee Telefilms, which at the time was associated with Star TV. The launch came with controversy from Dhirubhai Shai who claimed that the new channel was airing his movies without his authorisation. Shah owned Cable Video (India) Ltd. and was in the business since at least 1980, while having a catalogue of hundreds of films. Joining Shah in the complaint against Zee Telefilms was Siddharta Srivastava, CEO of the Asia Television Network. Star and Zee executives denied Shah and Srivastava's comments, as Cable Video (India) only owned video rights; these rights did not cover television. Moreover, the channel transmitted from Hong Kong, where Star TV was based; Zee TV was broadcasting from there as it was still barred from broadcasting from within India, while ATN broadcast from the Philippines.

The channel was available on DST-Kristal's subscription television package, which would eventually become Kristal-Astro, in Brunei; it was dropped in January 1999 in a line-up revision. That same month, Zee TV Europe announced that a European version of Zee Cinema would take more time to develop; priority was given to Music Asia for its second channel, due to launch in June. A European version of Zee Cinema would "take some time to develop".

The channel was formerly a part of the Star channel umbrella. In September 1999, it was announced that Star TV would sell Zee TV. The following year led to the creation of Star Gold from its former partner.

In late 2004, it unveiled a theatrical campaign featuring "India's shortest thriller", using scenes from Bollywood movies cut into a two-minute segment. The campaign was made following Sony Max's own campaign to promote the channel featuring a drama scene involving a cricket player, as Sony Max aired cricket.

Canada's Asian Television Network announced the launch of a Canadian version of the channel in July 2005. As of November 2005, the channel had a share of 4.5% in India alone, tying with Sony Max, and below Star Gold. During 2006, the Middle Eastern version of the channel started airing content dubbed in Arabic, as most of its audience consisted of nationals from Arabic-speaking countries, and not South Asian expatriates in the region. It became a full-time Arabic-language feed on 10 October of that year.

In recent years, the channel has been showing more South Indian (Telugu, Tamil and Kannada) movies dubbed into Hindi, like its competitors.

== Related sister channels ==
=== Zee Action ===

Zee Action is a Hindi movie channel in India owned by the Zee Entertainment Enterprises that shows action movies, as its name suggests, especially South Indian and Hollywood films dubbed into Hindi. It was launched in 2006 along with Zee Classic and the now-defunct Zee Premier.

=== Zee Anmol Cinema ===

Zee Anmol Cinema is a Hindi movie channel in India targeted at rural audiences, similar to Star Utsav Movies, Sony Wah and Rishtey Cineplex. It is available on the Indian government-owned DD Free Dish platform, except for a period in 2019–20.

=== Zee Bollywood ===
Zee Bollywood is an Indian Bollywood movies television channel, which is owned and operated by Zee Entertainment Enterprises. Launched in August 2018.

=== Zee Classic ===
Zee Classic is a Hindi movie channel that shows old movies released before the 2000s. A similar channel is Sony Max 2, which shows Hindi movies released until the mid-2000s. Zee Classic was launched in March 28 2005 along with Zee Action and the now-defunct Zee Premier. It was shut down in August 2018 and replaced by Zee Bollywood, but was resurrected in May 2019.

== Availability ==
=== Worldwide ===
Zee Cinema is available in India and also caters to international markets like South-East America, Europe, Middle East, North Africa, Pakistan, Asia Pacific and the rest of Africa.

Zee Cinema (Canada) is available in Canada as a joint ventures with Ethnic Channels Group.

== See also ==
- Zee TV
- &TV (TV channel)
