= Raising a Father =

2009 American memoir by Arjun Sen

- Author: Arjun Sen
- Language: English
- Genre: Autobiography
- Published: 2009 (iUniverse)
- Publication place: United States
- Media type: Print (Kindle & Paperback)
- Pages: 184 pp
- ISBN: 1440158037

Raising a Father is an American memoir written by Arjun Sen and published by iUniverse in 2009. Sen wrote it as a Christmas gift for his daughter Raka Sen. The book focuses on Sen's relationship with his daughter beginning when she was eight years old. Raising a Father is widely regarded as inspirational writing that helps other fathers understand the needs of their children and how to have a strong relationship with them.

== Plot ==
Sen's story starts the day after September 11 and the destruction of the World Trade Center. Forced to take the next day off work, Sen takes advantage of the free time to ask his daughter what she thinks of their relationship and she says, "not good." Challenged, Sen asks her to explain, and she says that he does not really know her. She gives him a three-question quiz: "Who is my best friend?" "What is my favorite restaurant?" "What is the best thing you and I have ever done?" Sen got all three answers wrong. The results of that conversation launched him on a journey of befriending his daughter and becoming a more thoughtful, better parent. He quit his job as Vice President of Marketing and started a home-based business that would allow him to invest more time and attention in his daughter. Sen notes that he did not want to become one of those parents who get two duty telephone calls a year.

The memoir devotes some space to reminiscing about Sen's own childhood in India and the lessons he learned from his paternal grandmother. His grandmother's strict discipline and commitment to his education inspire him in his raising of his own daughter. One day, Sen who was born into the Hindu faith, finds himself wondering about religion. To his surprise, his grandmother does not forcefully advocate for Hinduism. She describes it as a "way of life" rather than a religion. Everyone must find the religion and way of life that suits him, she says. In reviewing his performance as a father, Sen refers back to his own childhood and the example set to him by his own grandmother. The memoir moves on to Sen's immigration to the United States. He arrived in 1988 with US $320. Fifteen years later, he was widely regarded as an important voice in the world of restaurant marketing. From here, the book comes back around to Sen's moment of awareness that he did not know his daughter well enough.

== Composition and Publication ==
Sen originally wrote the book for his daughter Raka as a present for her birthday. Later, when he decided to publish, he reviewed the stories with her and together they chose which ones would go into the printed book. Sen says that it was a collaborative project, to a great extent. In a radio interview, Sen said that he and Raka meant to inspire one parent at a time with their experiences. Subsequent to the publication of the book, Sen began giving lectures and interviews, based on the observations he made in Raising a Father. Sen also followed up on the book with an online blog that expands on some of the themes of the book such as how to stay in touch with Raka when she goes to college.

== Themes ==
"Raising A Father" deals with the struggles to balance work and successful parenting and the specific struggles of being a single father. Though some media coverage sees a Christian message in the book, Sen says that "Raising a Father" is non-sectarian and written for everyone.

Sen emphasizes the need to really know one's children, not just make assumptions about them. In describing his book, Sen said on TV Asia that he had a moment of discovery when, in looking through his daughter's closet, he found a cache of photographs that pictured her mother. His regret that she was hiding part of her identity from him informed many of his parenting decisions from that moment. Sen describes moments like these as "wake up calls" to which parents need to be attentive. The book also calls for parents to establish some way to objectively measure the quality of their relationship with their children—much as they would measure the success of a business or an employee. Sen describes himself as a former "addict" to work and he sees work addiction as one of the worst things that can interfere with good parenting.

== Reception ==
Raising a Father received considerable media coverage in the United States and in Asia. In a two-part "Face to Face" series on TV Asia, interviewer Vikas Nangia featured Sen on Father's Day. Nangia described "Raising a Father" as "doing exceptionally well all across the United States--matter of fact throughout North America." During his interview, Sen explains the title of the book. When he was around halfway through writing it, he discovered "It wasn't the daughter that needed to be raised; it was the goofball dad." Nangia notes that the book is not just about Sen, but that it captures universal experiences of parenthood: "This could be the story of your house."
