= Asiyah =

Asiyah can refer to:

- Asiya, wife of the Pharaoh, foster-mother of Moses
- Assiah, the world in Kabbalah

== See also ==
- Asia (disambiguation)
- Asiya Andrabi, a separatist leader in Jammu and Kashmir, India
- Aasiya Kazi (born 1991), Indian television actress
- Aasiya, a fictional character in the 2017 Indian film Raees portrayed by Mahira Khan
