= Radio Free Asia (disambiguation) =

Radio Free Asia is a United States government-funded news broadcaster in Asia in operation since 1996.

Radio Free Asia may also refer to:

- Radio Free Asia (Committee for a Free Asia), an anti-communist news agency operated from 1951 to 1955 by the United States Central Intelligence Agency
- Radio of Free Asia, sometimes also referred to as Radio Free Asia
