= Main Hoon =

Entertainment talk show on TV Asia channel

- The original logo of Main Hoon
- Country of origin: India
- No. of seasons: 1

Production
- Running time: approx. 22 minutes

Original release
- Network: TV Asia

Main Hoon is an entertainment talk show on TV Asia channel that hosts some of the biggest Bollywood celebrities. It showcases some of the biggest stars in the business and is watched by a wide audience that includes people from the film fraternity.

== Overview and concept ==
The show profiles the best of star-makers who made the stars what they are today. These star makers include cinematographers, choreographers, makeup artists and stylists. The show tells the Masala stories of the biggest Bollywood celebrities.
