= Robert Goralski =

Robert Stanley Goralski
- Born: January 2, 1928; Chicago, Illinois, U.S.
- Died: March 23, 1988 (aged 60); McLean, Virginia, U.S.
- Occupation: News correspondent

Robert Stanley Goralski (January 2, 1928 – March 23, 1988) was a United States news correspondent for NBC News for 15 years in the 1960s and 1970s during a 35-year career in communications.

== Biography ==
Robert Goralski was born in Chicago, Illinois, on January 2, 1928. He served in the United States Navy during World War II in Pacific shipboard service as a Quartermaster aboard USS Sanctuary. He was later recalled up to serve in the Navy during the Korean War. He completed his undergraduate education at the University of Illinois, graduating in 1949 with a Bachelor of Science in Journalism and Political Science.

=== Journalism career ===
From 1947 to 1951 he was a full-time news broadcaster at WDWS, Champaign, Illinois, in his student years, becoming news director after graduation. He married the former Margaret Walton, originally of Wilton Junction, Iowa, and later of Silvis, Illinois, in 1948. They met at the University of Illinois-Urbana. As a Naval Reservist, he was recalled to duty during the Korean War, serving as a combat correspondent. After leaving the naval service, he continued his journalism career.

From 1952 to 1956 Goralski worked with Radio Free Asia at Tokyo, Japan, Karachi, Pakistan, and New Delhi, India. He produced, wrote and narrated the series "The Voice of Asia." From 1956 to 1961, Goralski moved to the Voice of America, in Washington, D.C., where he supervised broadcasts as English editor for Asia and Chief of the Burmese Service. He also oversaw production and programming, broadcast and wrote commentaries and feature programs for other services. He also had temporary assignments abroad, primarily in Asia.

==== NBC News ====
From 1961 to 1975, Goralski was a television and radio correspondent with NBC News. He served for extended periods as White House, State Department, Pentagon and Energy correspondents. As a White House correspondent, Goralski anchored coverage of John F. Kennedy's funeral for NBC.

In the mid-1960s, Goralski shifted to covering the Pentagon, and spent two years total in Southeast Asia, covering the war in Vietnam. On June 5, 1967, Goralski was one of seven American newsmen from the wire services, the three major American television networks and several individual newspapers across the United States that flew on board the aircraft carrier USS America in the Mediterranean. These seven were soon joined by others, 29 in all including media representatives from England, Greece, and West Germany. At night, Goralski of NBC News and Bill Gill of ABC News teamed up to present the "Gill-Goralski Report" on the shipboard television station, WAMR-TV, a half-hour on the latest developments in the Mideast and around the world.

In the mid-1970s he was back in Washington, D.C., and covered the Watergate hearings for NBC. In one notable instance, the hearings broke for a fifteen-minute pause that actually lasted over an hour. Goralski, live on national feed, had to essentially retell the entire history of the political break-in at the Watergate complex that led up to the hearings in order to fill up the air during the unexpectedly long recess. Goralski also covered the My Lai massacres trial of Lt. William Calley. Due to his coverage of the original incident, he was called as a witness during the proceedings. He also reported stories breaking from the Middle East, Laos, the Dominican Republic and sites of international conferences.

==== After NBC ====
In 1975, Goralski left broadcasting and accepted a position as Director of Information for Gulf Oil Corporation. There he developed and directed corporate communications at the national and local level and served as a spokesman on public affairs issues. In an article in The Washington Post, published February 10, 1978, about political fundraising through political action committees, it was reported that "Not all special-interest groups are willing participants, however, Gulf Oil Corp., whose political gifts practices caused an international scandal a few years ago, steers clear of fundraisers and requests for funds as official corporate policy.

"'We avoid them like the plaque,[sic]' says Robert Goralski, director of Gulf's public relations."

From 1983 until his death in 1988, he was a self-employed author, lecturer and consultant. In 1981, Goralski published the "World War II Almanac, 1931-1945", (G.P. Putnam's Sons, New York, ISBN 0-399-12548-5) which went through several printings. Other publications include "Press Follies", a collection of journalistic goofs and gaffes, published by I.I.S. Books in 1983, and "Oil and War" with Russell Freeburg (William Morrow & Company) in 1987. Goralski also wrote the introduction to "The CBS Benjamin Report", published by the Media Institute in 1984, contributed a portion of "The Best of Emphasis" (Newman Press) in 1968, and the annual section on Vietnam for Yearbooks of the Encyclopædia Britannica, 1966-1975 editions.

=== Death ===
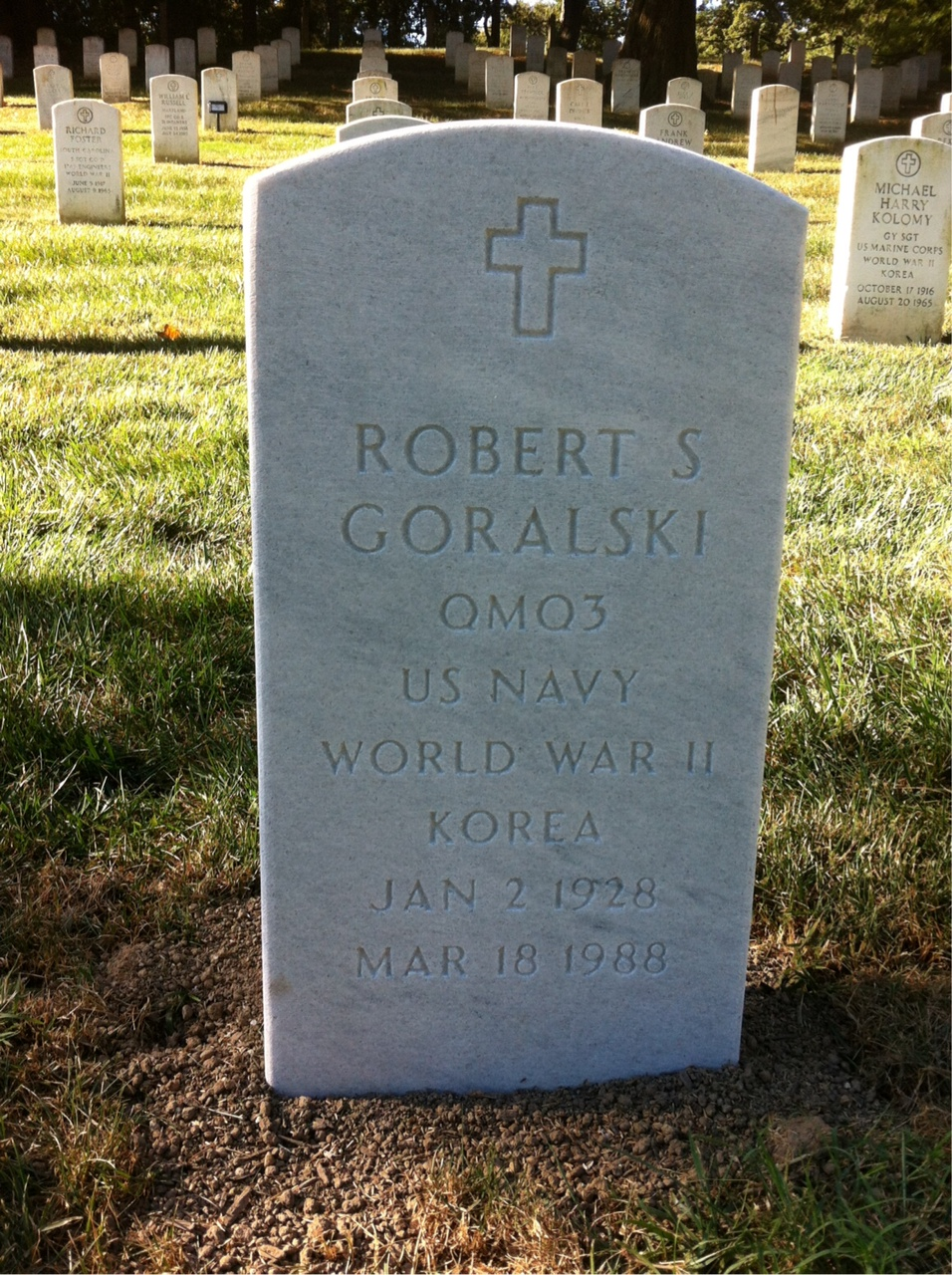
Grave at Arlington National Cemetery

Goralski died of cancer in McLean, Virginia on March 23, 1988, at the age of 60. He is interred at Arlington National Cemetery. Goralski was recognized by the Columbia School of Journalism and the American Television Academy for his news reporting.

Goralski is survived by his three children, Douglas, Dorothy, and Katherine. His wife, Margaret, who served on the Board of Directors at the Claude Moore Colonial Farm in Langley, Virginia, died after a long illness on January 26, 2013. She was 84.

== See also ==
- Russell Freeburg
