= Asia Ray Smith =

American actress (born 1988)

- Born: December 7, 1988 (age 36); Kaimuki, Hawaii
- Other names: Asia Smith
- Occupation: Actress
- Years active: 2003–2006; 2010

Asia Ray Smith (born December 7, 1988) is an American actress. She is best known for her role as Sierra Hoffman on The Young and the Restless.

== Early life ==
She is the daughter of The Young and the Restless's former Head Writer John F. Smith. She attended Punahou School on the island of Oahu in Hawaii.

== Filmography ==
- 2003-06: The Young and the Restless as Sierra Hoffman (Role: February 14, 2003 – February 23, 2006)
- 2010: Change as Student Speaker (Post-Pro)
