= Radio Free Asia (Committee for a Free Asia) =

Defunct US news agency

Radio Free Asia (RFA) was a news agency operated from 1951 to 1955 by the Central Intelligence Agency, through the Committee for Free Asia, to broadcast anti-Communist propaganda.

RFA first broadcast in 1951 from RCA facilities in Manila, Philippines. Broadcasts were made in three Chinese dialects, as well as in English. RFA maintained offices in Tokyo, and aside from in the Philippines, broadcasts were also made from Dhaka and Karachi, Pakistan. Although intended to broadcast anti-Communist propaganda into mainland China, as well as to overseas Chinese and others, the news agency faced difficulties in doing so. In mainland China personal radio ownership was low, and in other parts of Asia, radio reception was poor. In 1953, the Committee for Free Asia decided to terminate RFA, with it finally going off the air in 1955. However, propaganda broadcasting continued with new facilities in Seoul through Radio Of Free Asia until 1966.

Radio Free Europe and Radio Free Asia were later preserved by the Clinton Administration and repurposed into their modern iterations.
