= John F. Smith =

John F. Smith may refer to:

- John F. Smith (writer), American soap opera writer and producer
- John F. Smith Jr. (born 1938), American businessman
- Phenomenal Smith (John Francis Smith, 1864–1952), American baseball player
- John Frederick Smith (1806–1890), English novelist
- Ranger John Francis Smith, a fictional character
- John F. Smith (musician), British musician and trade unionist

== See also ==
- John Smith (disambiguation)
