= A.S.I.A. =

Romanian girlgroup

- Origin: Romania
- Genres: Pop, Dance
- Years active: 1999–2007; 2023–present
- Label: MediaPro Music
- Members: Anca Neacșu; Sorana Mohamad; Iana Novac; Anemona Niculescu
- Past members: Irina Nicolae; Alexandra Potora; Silvia Sârbu; Alina Crișan

A.S.I.A. are a Romanian girlgroup founded on March 8, 1999. The name of the group is an acronym of the first names of the four singers who made up the original line-up: Anca, Sorana, Irina, Anemona.

The group made a comeback in 2023. Currently the group's acronym reflects the current form of the group's line-up: Anca, Sorana, Iana, Anemona.

== Lineups ==
1999–2000

- Anca Neacșu
- Sorana Mohamad
- Irina Nicolae
- Anemona Niculescu

2000–2002

- Anca Neacșu
- Sorana Mohamad
- Irina Nicolae
- Alexandra Potora

2002–2004

- Anca Neacșu
- Sorana Mohamad
- Irina Nicolae
- Alina Crișan

2004–2005

- Silvia Sârbu
- Sorana Mohamad
- Irina Nicolae
- Alina Crișan

2005–2007

- Silvia Sârbu
- Sorana Mohamad
- Iana Novac
- Alina Crișan

== Discography ==
=== Studio albums ===
- A.S.I.A. (1999)
- Periculos (2000)
- Nopți albe (2000)
- Iubiri adevărate (2001)
- Eu, tu și ... Luna de pe cer (2002)
- Urban (2004)
- Shanana (2005)

=== Compilations ===
- A.S.I.A. Collection (2001)
- A.S.I.A. FM (2002)
- Best Of A.S.I.A. (2023)
