= Russell Freeburg =

American journalist (born 1923)

Russell William Freeburg (born March 4, 1923) is an American journalist who was a former managing editor and Washington bureau chief for the Chicago Tribune. He is the co-author of a book on the role of oil in World War II.

== Biography ==
Of Swedish descent, he is a native of Galesburg, Illinois. He served as a staff sergeant with the 8th armored division in World War II in the Ardennes, Rhineland, and Central Europe campaigns. He was awarded the Bronze Star Medal for advancing alone under enemy fire to persuade a German gun emplacement to surrender. He was graduated from Washington University in St. Louis in 1948. He also attended Knox College in Galesburg, where he met and married Sally Woodford of Chicago. They had three children, Jon, Hollis and Allison.

He turned 100 on March 4, 2023.

== Journalism career ==
Freeburg began his journalism career in 1948 at the City News Bureau of Chicago as a police and criminal courts reporter. He joined the Chicago Tribune in 1950 and in the next seven years covered news ranging from gangland slayings to the grain pits of the Chicago Board of Trade. After covering Chicago’s western suburbs for two years, he was assigned to the financial news section in 1952 and transferred to the city room in 1957. A year later, he was moved to Washington, where through the next decade he covered the economics beat, the Justice Department, the White House and presidential political campaigns. He was named executive director of the Tribune’s Washington bureau in 1966 and two years later he became the bureau chief. He became the paper’s managing editor in 1971, resigning a year later to return to Washington. Mr. Freeburg also has been a Meet the Press panelist. In 1974/1975, Mr. Freeburg was White House coordinator to President Gerald Ford’s Citizens’ Action Committee to Fight Inflation.

== Author ==
- Inside The Front Page published in 2019 by Ampersand, Inc. A memoir about Freeburg's life in the newspaper business in Chicago and Washington, DC in the aftermath of WWII and into the political turmoil of the mid-20th century.
- Oil & War with co-author Robert Goralski of NBC News, was published in 1987 by William Morrow and Company. The book told about the deadly struggle for oil in the years before and during World War II and how control of it eventually meant victory or defeat. It was part of a public television series in 1993 on oil.
- There Ought to Be a Place - A history of the Congregational Summer Assembly, published in 2001, on the occasion of the organization's centennial anniversary.
