= Zee TV =

Indian Hindi-language television channel

ZEE TV
- Logo used since 2025
- Country: India
- Broadcast area: Worldwide (excluding Malaysia)
- Headquarters: Mumbai, Maharashtra, India

Programming
- Language: Hindi
- Picture format: 1080p HDTV
- Timeshift service: Zee TV HD +1 (formerly)

Ownership
- Owner: Zee Entertainment Enterprises
- Sister channels: See list of channels owned by ZEEL

History
- Launched: 1 October 1992; 34 years ago

Links
- Website: zeetv.zee5.com

Availability Available on all major Indian DTH and cable

Terrestrial
- DVB-T2 (India): Check local frequencies

Streaming media
- ZEE5: SD & HD
- Jio TV: SD & HD
- YouTube TV: SD & HD

ZEE TV, also known as Z TV, is an Indian Hindi language general entertainment pay television channel owned by Zee Entertainment Enterprises. It was launched on 1 October 1992 as the oldest privately owned television channel in India. It now broadcasts worldwide.

== History ==
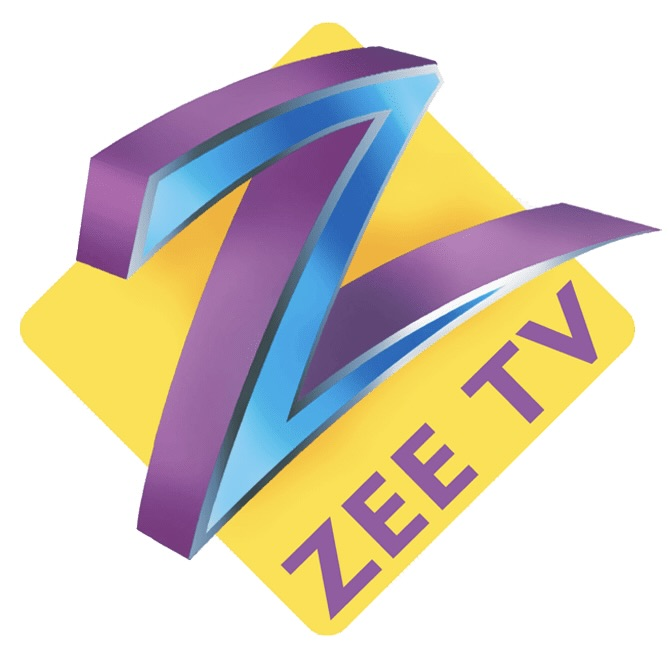
Logo used from 2005 to 2011

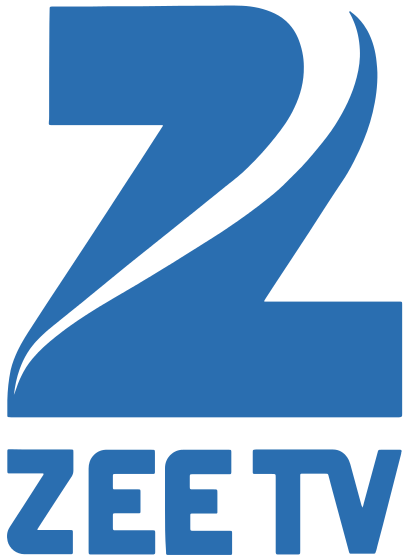
Logo used from 2011 to 2017

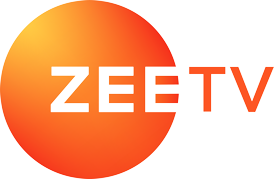
Logo used from 2017 to 2025

Logo used since 2025

In 1991, Li Ka-shing started his STAR satellite television network. At the end of the year, Subhash Chandra of the Essel Group finished a round of negotiations with HutchVision, after a series of rejections, and the condition that Chandra would pay US$5 million a year for the satellite transponder. Li signed the deal in India a few months later and approached interested companies, but nobody was interested in paying the transponder fees. Chandra was the last possible man to sign the contract, by gathering money from his non-resident Indian friends and in the creation of a holding company for the channel, Asia Today.

Zee TV was launched on 2 October 1992, as the flagship channel of the Zee Telefilms Ltd. The channel initially broadcast three hours a day, with its output consisting mainly of old Hindi movies and reruns of Doordarshan serials. The channel's initial manager was a Doordarshan news reporter who was on leave from his employer. Three months later, the airtime had doubled to six hours.

Within less than a month after its launch, Zee TV was being criticised for its programming lineup; a cynic reviewed the network giving "A for effort" and "Z(ee) for quality", while others within the network called it an "upbeat clone of Doordarshan". To offset such negative criticism, Zee TV began producing more original content, opting to create its own pool of producers to reduce reliance on Doordarshan staff. Over time, the success of the network and its original programmes, such as Philip Top Ten and Tara, prompted Doordarshan to create its own versions instead (Superhit Muqabala, Chandrakanta and mythological series).

Zee TV rejected a 1993 bid to broadcast Sun TV during the afternoons, forcing Sun TV to negotiate with competitor ATN instead.

It began full-day broadcasts in 1993. After Rupert Murdoch's buyout of Star TV, Zee TV faced some uncertainties about its future; nonetheless, Zee TV had gained rural audiences by November 1993. On 22 December 1993, Murdoch was planning to buy a 49.9% equity stake in the channel's owner, Hong Kong–based, British Virgin Islands-registered Asia Today. By year-end 1995, Zee TV already had three channels, the other two being Zee Cinema, a Bollywood channel, and EL TV, which broadcast in English and regional languages. Numerous competitors had also emerged around this time. 11 million households were receiving the channel. Zee Cinema launched precisely when, in April 1995, Doordarshan cleared all of its programming for seven days when the state network was carrying programming in homage to the deceased former prime-minister Morarji Desai. In 1996, Zee TV was airing a programme produced by NDTV, precisely at a time when their programmes were leaving Doordarshan and moving to Star Plus.

Its reputation began to falter when, on 4 January 1997, news head Rajat Sharma resigned, while 43 out of 48 staff in the news team quit. The 10pm bulletin that day was completed thanks to the help of a team of outsiders. This was largely triggered by STAR's plan of "Indianising" local operations and putting the only independent TV channel in India (in terms of news operation) at risk. Over time, STAR TV's relations with Zee began to sour more, with Murdoch preferring Star Plus. The network had strengthened its presence in October 1996 when it appointed Rathikant Basu as its director, increasing the amount of Hindi programmes on the channel and deviating attentions from Zee. On 7 October, Murdoch wanted to float the channel at the New York Stock Exchange, which he thought was "very profitable".

Zee TV lost its leadership to Star Plus, which took over its role after Murdoch sold his stake in Asia Today.

A new logo, an aqua blue Z, was unveiled in June 2011.

In 2014, Zee TV, along with its sister channels, underwent a branding overhaul.

On 15 October 2017, coinciding with Zee's 25-year silver jubilee, all of its channels were rebranded, with the main channel adopting its current slogan, Aaj Likhenge Kal and the brand anthem "Andekha, Ansuna, Anchua" used for the official jingle of these Zee channels.

On 30 May 2021, Zee TV planned to revamp its look and air four new television series, but because of the COVID-19 pandemic in India, the idea was postponed and thereafter scrapped.

Zee TV unveiled a new logo on 8 June 2025, with its coverage of the 2025 Zee Cine Awards. The new logo features a Z mark, while the channel adopted a new slogan, Yours Truly, Z. The new logo was heavily criticized by netizens, seeing it as a downgrade or similar to the JioHotstar logo.

== Programming ==
The channel mostly airs content intended for family and coming-of-age audiences ranging from comedy to drama. It also aired reality shows such as Sa Re Ga Ma Pa, I Can Do That, India's Best Cinestars Ki Khoj and Dance India Dance.

== Zee Rishtey Awards ==
Since 2007, the channel has presented an annual award show, the Zee Rishtey Awards, to performers on its show based on popularity. Nominations for the awards are declared by the channel. The winners are selected through voting done via online and through SMS.

== International versions ==
=== Europe ===
The European version of Zee TV traces its origins to TV Asia, which was set up by non-resident Indian and Pakistani immigrants in the United Kingdom and started broadcasting in July 1992. It was the first channel in Europe targeting Indian, Pakistani, and Bangladeshi immigrants. It launched in France in 1993. By 1994, the channel was facing financial difficulties, forcing Zee TV to take over the channel in March 1995. The channel also had local community programming as well as content targeting viewers of different religions (Hinduism, Sikhism, and Islam). Coinciding with the takeover, in April 1995, it signed a deal with Nethold's Multichoice. As of October 1995, a subscription to Zee TV on British cable cost £24.98, costing even more than Adult Channel (£23.98).

The network produced special programmes for the 1997 United Kingdom general election, the first with candidates of South Asian origin. Later that year, the Independent Television Commission ruled that it was carrying live cricket from India with tobacco advertising, which is restricted under British law. In 1998, the channel launched in Portugal on the TV Cabo platform, but only in Lisbon.

Three of its sister channels were removed from linear television in the UK on 1 June 2019, as part of a decision taken to implement the ZEE5 platform in Europe, leaving only Zee TV and Zee Cinema. An HD feed existed until 2019; it resumed on 13 January 2022. Its advertising sales are handled by Sky Media.

=== Asia ===
The channel launched in Singapore on 11 September 1995, as the first Hindi channel on Singapore Cable Vision.

=== Africa ===
The channel launched in 1997 and is available with English subtitles on DStv.

=== Americas ===
Zee TV launched in the US on 15 July 1998 when Dish Network was adding new ethnic channels to its line-up. Zee TV Americas started producing reality content in English in 2017; Made in America premiered in October 2017.

== See also ==
- &TV
- Zee Kannada
- Zee Marathi
- Zee Cinema
