= Asia Television Network =

Independent television channel

The Asian Television Network (ATN) was the first independent television channel in India. It was broadcast via satellite and was owned by businessman Siddhartha Srivastava.

== History ==
Although Siddhartha Srivastava’s experience with cable networks dated back to 1982, the Asian Television Network (ATN) was founded in November 1991, utilising the Russian Gorizont Statsionar-41 satellite to broadcast its signals. Alliances with film producers enabled the channel to build a back catalogue of over 2,000 Bollywood feature films and 10,000 film songs, in addition to hundreds of films in other regional languages. Broadcasts commenced in August 1992, a few weeks ahead of Subhash Chandra's Zee TV. The launch and development of the channel were hampered by issues with cable operators, who were required to install an additional satellite dish to receive its programming, which aired only for a few hours each night. Although the launch of Zee TV threatened to diminish ATN’s potential, the channel had secured a foothold with eight million viewers across two channels on the Russian satellite by January 1994.

In 1993, ATN began broadcasting the Tamil-language satellite network Sun TV after being denied an afternoon slot by Zee TV.

In early 1994, ATN was structured as follows:

- ATN One: Carried news items provided by Reuters and entertainment programming from the American ABC network and the Thames production company.
- ATN Gold: Focused on Hindi-language movies and general entertainment.

ATN also planned to launch Tamil, Telugu and Malayalam language services on two additional channels.

The channel’s operations were unstable, and in 1995 its channels were taken off the air, with broadcasts resuming in mid-1996. On resumption, the channel had moved to PanAmSat's PAS-4 satellite, thereby extending its audience reach to 77% of India’s population, compared with Zee TV’s 85% and Star TV’s 82%. The migration from Gorizont to PAS-4 was necessitated by outstanding dues to the Russian company, estimated to be nearly US$1 million as of April 1996. At the time of resumption (July 1996), Srivastava promised a revamped version of the channel.

In 1995, ATN received a warning from Mumbai-based cable movie tycoon Dharubai Shah on the grounds that it had infringed cable rights by promising 21 movies free-to-air. The issue escalated when Shah became involved in a conflict with the newly launched Zee Cinema.

During the latter half of the 1990s, ATN’s original programming included shows such as Superhit Hungama, Maine Dekha, Gune Dekha, Movie Magic, Starana, Tarana, Chill-Out Zone, Right On, Andaz Apna Apna, Once More, Sitaron Ke Sang, Mere Geet, Geet Mala, Gunjan, as well as a half-hour Hindi news bulletin. ATN also planned to diversify its business by entering the audio cassette and film production sectors; the latter involved collaboration with two leading US studios.

ATN Bangla, the oldest private television channel in Bangladesh, originated as a music slot aimed at Bengali audiences on the ATN Music channel. The subsequent closure of ATN and its music channel facilitated the launch of ATN Bangla, with the ATN initials serving as an homage to the Indian network.
