= Radio of Free Asia =

Anti-Communist radio broadcaster

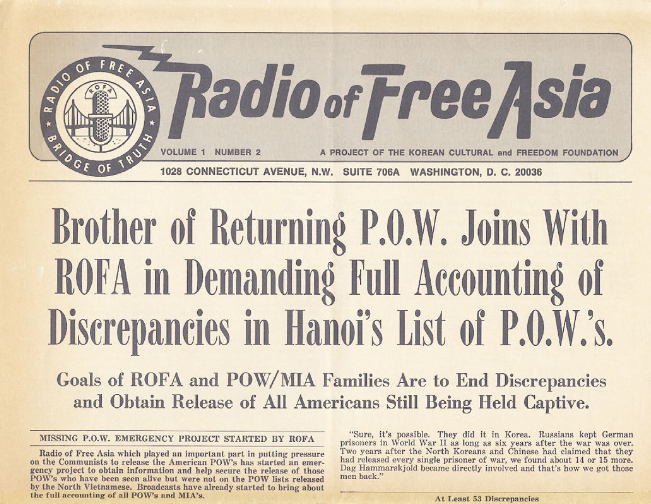
The front page of a Radio of Free Asia newsletter (1966)

Radio of Free Asia, sometimes called Radio Free Asia, was an anti-Communist radio station created by the Korean Cultural and Freedom Foundation which broadcast from Seoul into North Korea, China, and Vietnam. In a congressional hearing, General Coulter, then President of the Korean Cultural and Freedom Foundation, declared Radio of Free Asia the principal project of the foundation. It operated from 1966 to early 1970s.

== History ==
The Korean Cultural and Freedom Foundation (KFF) was first organized in Washington, D.C. in 1964 with the goal of "containing communism" in Asia. The Korean Central Intelligence Agency (KCIA) put pressure on the KFF to support a project to broadcast anti-communist propaganda into nearby Asian communist states. The intention was to raise money for the project from the US.

Radio of Free Asia (ROFA), as the radio station became known, began broadcasting from Seoul on 15 August 1966. The first broadcast featured a taped message from Soong Mei-ling.

ROFA formally had an American chief but its two directors of operations were KCIA operatives who worked under Kim Jong-Pil. The station was given free access to South Korean government facilities with broadcasts monitored by the KCIA's psychological warfare unit. The US Justice Department later suggested the station was “acting under the direction of and control of the Korean Government”.

Although mainly funded through private donations, it had the financial support of several elected officials before and after broadcasts began, including Senator Bob Dole and Presidents Truman and Eisenhower. South Korean President Park Chung Hee sent letters to 60,000 prominent Americans asking for contributions to the project. Millions of dollars were raised for Radio of Free Asia through direct mail requests to American citizens, soliciting funds both by claiming they would finance the broadcasts and that they would aid starving children in Asia.

In 1971, US government agencies, including the Justice Department, began investigating the station for alleged violation of the Foreign Agent Registration Act. The broadcaster's status as a foreign private foundation was called into question due to the free air time provided by the South Korean government on its national network. Bo Hi Pak secured the services of former CIA Deputy Director of Intelligence Robert Amory Jr. for legal assistance to defend against these charges. At the time Amory was employed by the Thomas Corcoran law firm and was a legal counsellor to the CIA. The investigation was terminated in 1972 and soon after the station stopped broadcasting from Seoul.

US federal and state investigations began in 1976 to determine whether or not the funds were used for the stated goals, as accusations were levied that the funds were used to finance campaigns to gain favor for South Korea from United States congressmen. Despite collecting money for several years since the inception of Radio of Free Asia, it is unclear to what degree the station broadcast after 1966, with IRS tax returns for the foundation listing no expenses for broadcasting in the 1970s.
