= Spirit Fruit Society =

Communitarian group in the United States

The Spirit Fruit Society was a communitarian group in the United States that was organized after a period of repeated business depressions during the 1890s. The society had its beginnings in Lisbon, Ohio, and over the years of its existence moved to Ingleside, Illinois, and finally to California. Plagued by rumor, suspicion, and attacks in the press during its early years, the group remained active until 1930. Although it never numbered more than a handful of adherents, the Spirit Fruit Society existed longer and more successfully than any other American utopian group.

The name is derived from the group's belief that mankind's spiritual state is that of a bud or blossom on a plant and that man's soul has not yet developed into a fruit from a blossom. The goal of the society was to bring the soul to fruition. As the society's founder, Jacob Beilhart, said in documents for incorporation of the society, "... as yet, man is an underdeveloped 'plant' which has not manifested the final fruit, which he is to produce." The essential philosophy of the group was based upon a belief in self-renunciation, hard work, tolerance, and peace.

== Jacob L. Beilhart, founder ==
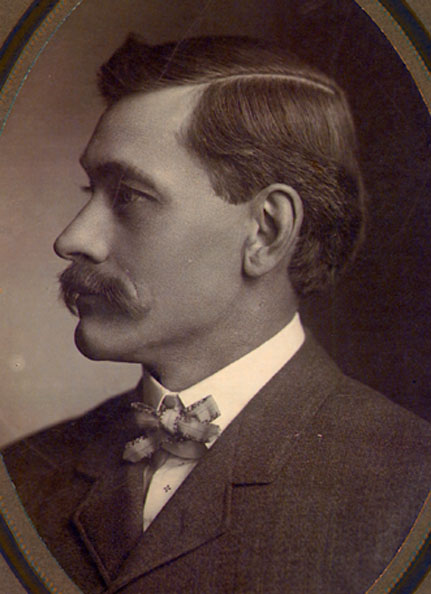
Jacob Beilhart, 1904

The Spirit Fruit Society was started by Jacob Beilhart (4 March 1867 – 24 November 1908), who was born in Columbiana County, Ohio, to a Lutheran father and a Mennonite mother. Beilhart was raised in the Lutheran church and his early home environment was strictly religious.

When he was 18, Beilhart moved to Kansas, where he met and married Olive Louema Blow, whose family belonged to the Seventh-day Adventist church, which Beilhart then joined. Jacob and Louema traveled to California to attend the Adventist College at Healdsburg. Jacob received a preacher's license and the couple returned to Kansas where he began preaching. After two years, however, faced with the prospect of being sent to work in other areas of the country, Beilhart left preaching, maintaining that he wanted to do something "besides talk". Beilhart felt a strong need to help the sick so he enrolled in a nursing program at the Battle Creek Sanitarium, which was run by Dr. John Harvey Kellogg.

Beilhart became friends with C. W. Post, who had been a patient at the sanitarium. Post's health improved dramatically while under the care of a Christian Science "faith healer", Mrs. Elizabeth K. Gregory. In 1892, Post started La Vita Inn, a sanitorium of his own, and hired Beilhart as an associate. The two men took instruction in Christian Science while Beilhart worked at the inn and helped develop Post's cereal drink, Postum. Post and Beilhart rejected much of the Christian Science doctrine, but embraced the religion's view that illness was an illusion and could be overcome by mental suggestion and self-sacrifice.

During his time in Kansas, Beilhart obsessively investigated a variety of beliefs, including Christian Science, Divine Science, Spiritualism, and Theosophy. He found, however, that none of these religions held his interest. In time, he came to the realization that he would not adhere to any one denomination, but develop a faith of his own by combining aspects of several different religions.

== Philosophy ==
Strictly speaking this is not a religion. We came here because we became dissatisfied with the frivolities and faddisms of what people call religion. We do not preach, we practice.

— Jacob Beilhart, Waukegan Sun, May 1905

Beilhart rejected materialism and disavowed personal property. He held that jealousy, doubt, and the fear of losing the love of another caused much of the disease people experienced. He felt that rejecting personal possessions was a means of attaining the Fruit of the Universal Spirit.

Members of the Spirit Fruit Society lived according to the following basic principles: seek happiness through selflessness; follow one's conscience; take responsibility for one's actions—and develop an awareness of the consequences of one's actions on others; and accept whatever happens. Beilhart believed very strongly in the individual's right to guide his own actions, and not be dictated to by others. While there was no mention of any kind of organization or hierarchy in any documents, as the leader, Beilhart likely made important decisions concerning the group. There is no record of any kind of internal conflict between members.

Newspapers of the time reported that the society promoted free love, but the society promoted free love only in the sense that consenting adults had a right to change partners and even to have more than one partner at a time. Rather than promiscuousness, though, the society promoted tolerance, including tolerance of homosexuality. The Spirit Fruit Society, unlike most other communitarian groups of that time, did not seek to convert or recruit others to the group. Members were permitted to come and go as they pleased. The goal of the commune was not to convert or to expand membership in the society—it was simply to live as the adherents wished to live.

Very little exists in the way of firsthand accounts of life within the society. In an effort to dispel some of the misconceptions and rumors about the society, Beilhart wrote extensively for newspapers to explain the workings of the group.

The members worked together and shared all property. If a member of the society needed money for some purpose, they were free to take it from a community supply. Women of the society worked in the house sewing, setting type for newsletters, and general housework, while the men worked the farm. One of the founding principles of the society was that of the "free gift". It dictated that, if anyone wanted something that they had to give—printed materials in particular—they had only to ask and it would be given to them without charge. After reading or seeing the society in practice, those people were free to contribute if they wished, but it was stressed that this was a "free gift" and not payment. In order to rise from their lower, selfish nature into an unselfish, spiritual nature, the society taught, everyone should obey the law of their being and subdue passions and impulses that control them by nature. The society believed in business and societal laws, but they felt that man would rise above those laws when they gained full control of their lower nature. They maintained, however, that they should still be obedient to those laws.

== History ==
=== Lisbon, Ohio, the beginning ===
In 1896, Beilhart returned to Ohio and settled in Lisbon, close to where he was reared. Paramount among the reasons for his return was the confession of Louema Beilhart that her two children were not his, but C. W. Post's. She soon left Lisbon for her home in La Cygne, Kansas. In 1899, Beilhart decided to create an intentional community to practice his newly developed beliefs and to demonstrate this practice to others. In the aftermath of the Civil War, a number of communitarian groups were started around the United States. The rise in activism was further promoted by the effects of the depression at end of the 19th century. By then, however, McKinley prosperity had developed, and, in any case, Beilhart never displayed a particular interest in politics or economics. At this time he started two newspapers, Spirit Fruit and Spirit Voice, which were widely distributed and supported by donations. The Spirit Fruit Society was officially incorporated as a religious organization in 1901. The stated goal in the incorporation documents was to "teach mankind how to apply the truths taught by Jesus Christ." Beilhart made no attempt to solicit members for his commune and sometimes rejected applicants when he felt they were not fit candidates. As a result, the commune only attracted about a dozen residents, mostly from outside the area.

The group did not beg or in any way disturb their neighbors. Beilhart preached in Chicago and elsewhere, but was not known to proselytize strongly. While the group typically kept to themselves, their mysterious nature led to misconceptions and suspicion in the press. Specifically, the birth of Beilhart's niece, Evelyn, was cause for concern as her mother, Mary Beilhart (Jacob's sister), was not married to the child's father, Ralph E. Galbreath (cousin of Ohio State Librarian Charles Burleigh Galbreath and State Senator Asher A. Galbreath). Dubbed the "Love Child", this birth prompted newspapers to characterize the group as a free-love society of promiscuity. The arrival of "Blessed" Katherine Herbeson, a teenager from Chicago, also gave concern. It was reported in the press that "Blessed" was either held against her will or brainwashed by the society. Her father and brother came and 'rescued' her and she was forced to leave the society against her wishes. Additional negative publicity occurred when Beilhart objected to his wife's petition for alimony.

In 1904, numerous newspaper articles and editorials were written, mostly in Chicago, about the society. Those articles were often sensationalist and tended to put the society in a bad light. The views of the society, particularly those against marriage and promoting free love, were not accepted well in the small Ohio village of Lisbon. In fact, a local newspaper reprinted a warning that had been distributed in the community: "Wanted – Fifty good women, over twenty and under fifty years of age; also fifty good honest-hearted men with families, to meet upon the Square when called upon, and go to the Spirit Fruit farm and tell them to take their departure at once or take the consequences, as tar is cheap and feathers plentiful."

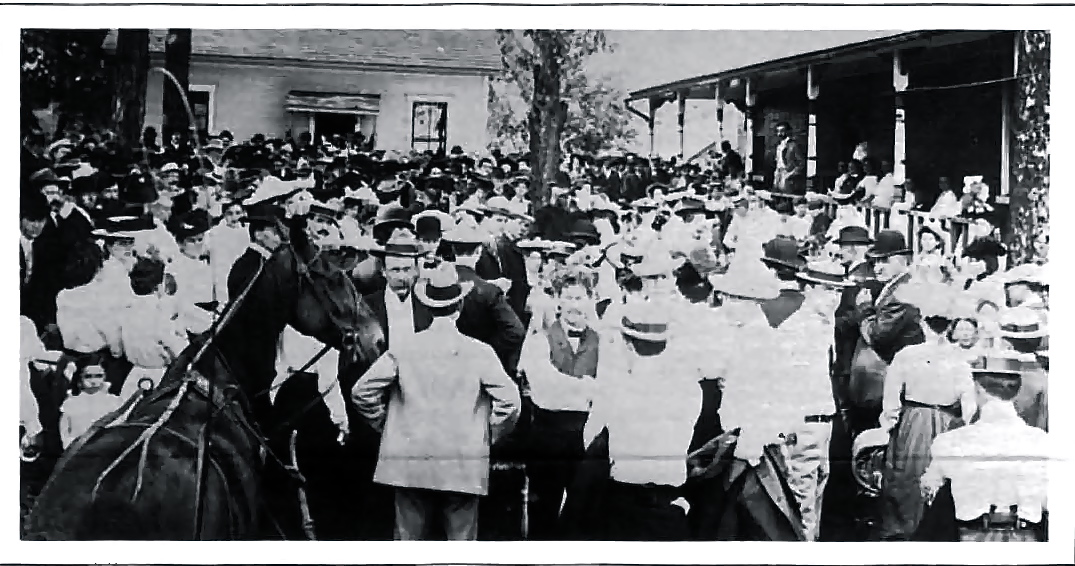
Spirit Fruit Society Open House – Lisbon, Ohio, 1904

In June 1904, Beilhart invited the public to an 'open house' where he attempted to explain the motives and beliefs of the society. Over 400 people attended the gathering. Among them, it has been claimed, were Clarence Darrow and Elbert Hubbard but this has not been documented, although Beilhart is known to have visited Hubbard in East Aurora and Darrow was a frequent visitor to the society during the Chicago and Ingleside years. In the end, the society's rejection of marriage on the grounds that it made a 'slave of the woman', and the misinterpretations of their views on free-love were too much for the people of Lisbon to accept. In late 1904, the group left Lisbon for Chicago, in the hope that their progressive ideas might be better tolerated there.

=== Ingleside, Illinois, and the death of Beilhart ===
In 1905, Beilhart purchased 90 acres (36 ha) near Ingleside, Illinois, along Wooster Lake, a tract known as the Dalziel Farm. About a dozen established members of the Spirit Fruit Society moved with Beilhart to Illinois, along with a few new members. Over the next two years the society built a spacious house and later a large barn entirely by hand. They were better received by their Illinois neighbors than they had been in Lisbon. On the property by the lake, the society's members hand-built a concrete-block home that they called the "Spirit Fruit Temple". The 2½-story residence had 32 rooms, a full basement, and modern (for the time) conveniences. The dining room accommodated up to 100 people. The society continued to live peacefully in Ingleside for several years. They provided for themselves from what came to be known as the "Spirit Fruit Farm", opened the farm and temple to visitors, and produced their newsletter. Beilhart continued to speak to groups in Chicago promoting the ideals of the society.

In November 1908, Beilhart became ill from acute appendicitis. Despite attention from a surgeon who performed an appendectomy, Beilhart developed peritonitis and died three days later. In keeping with the society's beliefs in simplicity, Beilhart was buried in a plain coffin in an unmarked grave overlooking Wooster Lake. None of the buildings remain, having been covered by a housing development, although Beilhart's grave remains in a brush-obscured corner of the tract.

The loss of a charismatic and dominant leader often precipitates the decline of such groups, but the Spirit Fruit Society persevered. This made the society unique among other groups of this time. Though the commune continued after his death, their two publications, Spirit Voice and Spirit Fruit, ceased to be produced. Virginia Moore was chosen president of the society upon Beilhart's death, and the community stayed together and carried on its activities as before. In 1911, the society put an advertisement in the local papers seeking to sell their lakefront property and 'temple'. Virginia Moore stated that the Illinois climate was not suitable for their activities and the decision had been made to move to California. In the winter of 1914–1915, the society moved west.

=== California and the end ===
In 1915, the society purchased 80 acres (32 ha) of land in Soquel, California, which they named "Hilltop Ranch". At this point, only 12 of the society's members remained. They included Mary Beilhart's two 'illegitimate' children born in Ohio, now 11 and 15 years old. Just as in Ohio and Illinois, the group made no efforts at recruiting new members, although three new members did join during this time.

The primary focus of the society at this time was simple subsistence. To continue as a group, they had to focus all of their energies on producing food. This was problematic because many of the members were becoming old and several suffered illnesses. Since the beginning, Beilhart and the other members had not actively sought out new members, believing that a small group was more viable. This proved to be their undoing as there were no younger members to sustain the farm. The original members, who had stayed with the group since its inception, began to leave and by 1928, only six were left. Financial strains forced them to relinquish the ranch and move to a house in the village of Soquel.

The group finally disbanded in 1930 when Virginia Moore died of cancer. After her death, the remaining members of the Spirit Fruit Society dispersed to various homes of friends and family. Despite the small membership, the society had been in existence for almost 30 years – 20 years beyond the death of its founder.

== Success of the society ==
Throughout its existence, the society never claimed more than a couple dozen members. They never actively recruited new members nor proselytized in the communities. Like many such organizations, they were often persecuted by the press and were the subject of dubious reports. Despite this, and, more significantly, despite the loss of their spiritual leader, Beilhart, the society continued to exist longer than most other communes at that time.

Though rooted in Christianity yet exhibiting traits of communalism, the members of the society were not bound by either set of beliefs or values. Murphy suggests that this is one of the reasons for the society's longevity – that, rather than be confined by one belief system, the members could easily adapt to, and solve, everyday issues arising within the community as well as threats from outside.

== Notes ==
1. Until this time the English word sanatorium had been used to describe a rest home for invalid soldiers. With the creation of the Battle Creek facility, the management created the new word, sanitarium.
2. Kellog later invented corn flakes with his brother, Will Keith Kellogg.
3. During his association with Post, the two men invented a breakfast drink called Postum. This drink eventually became the basis for Post's breakfast cereal company.
4. The case eventually was dismissed by the Columbiana County courts on the grounds that it lacked jurisdiction.
