= TV Asia =

American South Asian-language television channel

- Country: India; UK (1990–1995); USA (1992–)

Ownership
- Owner: Asia Star Broadcasting Inc.
- Key people: H.R. Shah; President & CEO

History
- Launched: 10 April 1990; 36 years ago
- Closed: March 1995; 31 years ago (UK)
- Replaced by: Zee TV

Links
- Website: tvasiausa.com

Availability

Streaming media
- Sling TV: Internet Protocol television

TV Asia is an Indian-American/South Asian television channel in the US. Launched in 1990, and originally broadcasting overnight during Sky One's downtime, it was Europe's first entertainment and information channel for the South Asian community from the Indian subcontinent and the first channel in the UK to be aimed at the Asian community. TV Asia was conceptualised and founded by Wasim Mehmood and Mohan Thariyan and after it had secured its status in the UK in 1992, it was sold to a partnership formed between the top Indian talent represented by Amitabh Bachchan.

On 8 July 1992, TV Asia began broadcasting for 10 hours a day via the Astra 1B satellite. The start-up costs in 1992 were 8 million pounds.

After two successful years the channel was sold at a profit to Dolphin Group owned by Ketan Somaiya. Dolphin Group later negotiated the deal for the channel to be sold to Subash Chandra's flagship Zee TV (India) and in March 1995 TV Asia was renamed as Zee TV (UK).

Some of the most popular shows on TV Asia and ZEE TV UK were first ever Asian pop chart show 'Music Channel Charts' and drama serial 'French Toast', both were produced and directed by popular British Asian artist Yasir Akhtar and Ghazanfar Ali.

In New York City and North America, TV Asia was also the first coast-to-coast entertainment and information channel for the South Asian community settled in the U.S. In spite of different ownership, currently TV Asia has retained the same logo and style of programming and airs regularly scheduled programs in Hindi, English, Gujarati, and other regional languages, 24 hours a day, seven days a week. The channel went national on July 1, 1998, when it launched on the Dish Network platform. The current Chairman/CEO of TV Asia is Dr. H.R. Shah.

== See also ==
- List of South Asian television channels in the United States
