= 194 =

194 may also refer to:

- 194 (number)
- AD 194
- 194 BC
- Minuscule 194
- Jordan 194
- Palestine 194
- 194th Fighter Squadron
- 194th Intelligence Squadron
- 194th Armored Brigade (United States)
- 194th Engineer Brigade
- 194th Regional Support Wing
- 194th Ohio Infantry
- 194th Battalion (Edmonton Highlanders), CEF
- 194th (2/1st South Scottish) Brigade
- No. 194 Squadron RAF

== Transportation ==
- 194 (MBTA bus)
- 194 (New Jersey bus)

=== Highways ===
- Connecticut Route 194
- Kentucky Route 194
- Maryland Route 194
- Oregon Route 194
- Pennsylvania Route 194
- Georgia State Route 194
- Maine State Route 194
- New York State Route 194
- Virginia State Route 194
- Washington State Route 194
- Japan National Route 194
- K-194 (Kansas highway)
- North Carolina Highway 194
- Wisconsin Highway 194
- Wyoming Highway 194
- Colorado State Highway 194
- Minnesota State Highway 194
- Texas State Highway 194
- State Highway 194 (Maharashtra)
- Interstate 194 (disambiguation)
- Interstate 194 (Michigan)

== See also ==
- 194th (disambiguation)
