= 194th Regiment =

194th Regiment may refer to:

- 194th Armor Regiment, United States
- 194th Glider Infantry Regiment, United States

== American Civil War regiments ==
- 194th New York Infantry Regiment
- 194th Ohio Infantry Regiment

== See also ==
- 1st Battalion, 194th Field Artillery Regiment
- 194th Brigade (disambiguation)
- 194th (disambiguation)
