= Columbiana County Courthouse =

Local government building in the United States

- U.S. Historic district – Contributing property
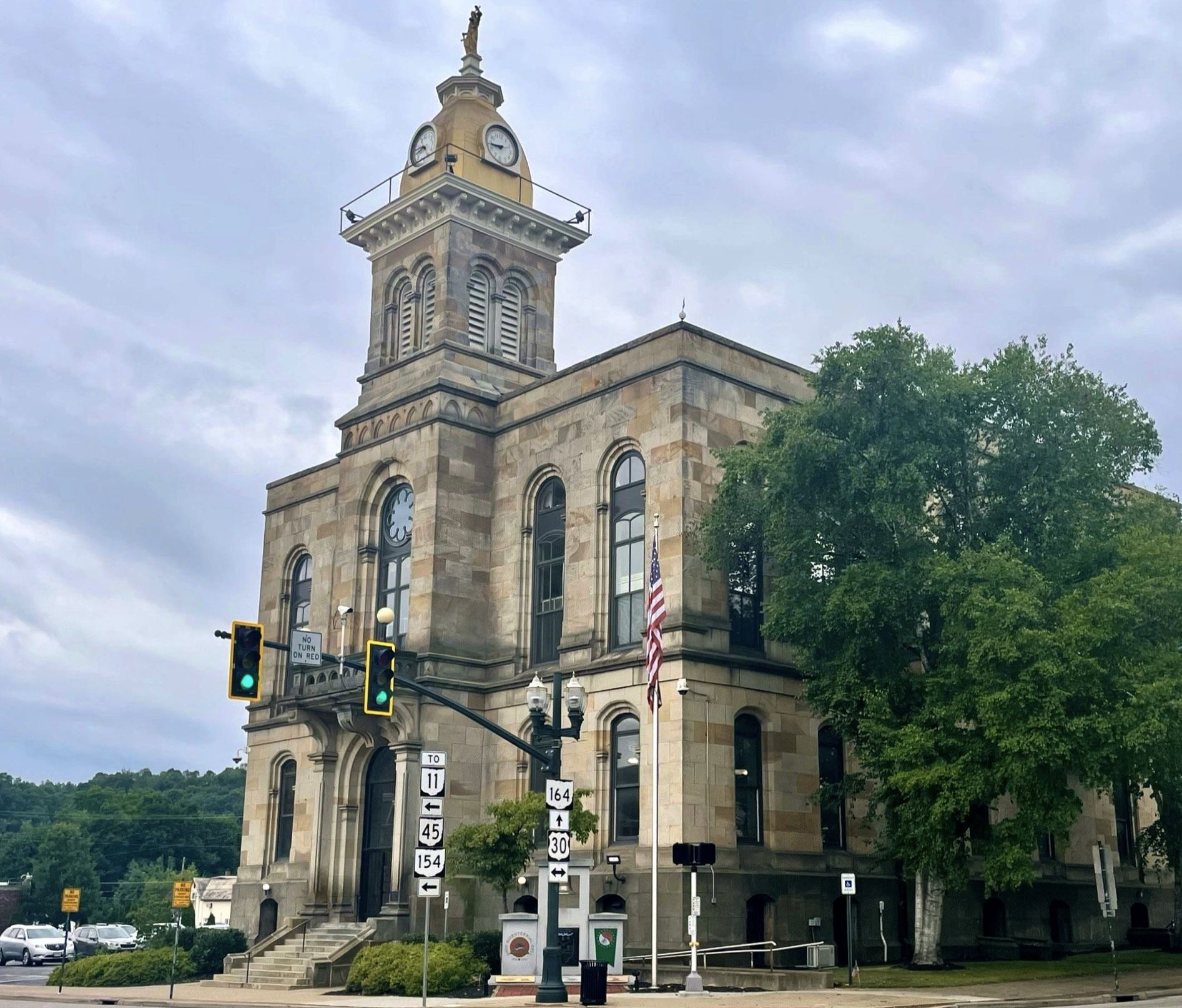
- The courthouse, located in the Lisbon Town Square.

- Location within Ohio Location within the United States
- Interactive map showing the location for Columbiana County Courthouse
- Location: 105 S. Market St. in Lisbon, Ohio
- Coordinates: 40°46′23″N 80°45′59″W
- Area: 42 acres (17 ha)
- Built: 1871
- Architect: H.E. Myer
- Architectural style: Italianate style
- Part of: Lisbon Historic District (ID79001794)
- Designated CP: August 24, 1979

The Columbiana County Courthouse is located at 105 South Market Street in Lisbon, Ohio. The courthouse was added to the National Register on August 24, 1979, as part of the Lisbon Historic District.

== History ==
Columbiana County was established in 1803 and was carved out of Jefferson County. Settlers had begun arriving since 1792 and had swelled to the proper numbers to form a county by the 1800s. The Ohio General Assembly selected New Lisbon, now known as Lisbon, as the county seat with the first courts being held in the home of a local citizen, Christian Smith.

The county soon built a simple log structure which cost $150 to build and furnish. This building would serve until 1817 when a new courthouse was needed. The county selected a plan for a two-story brick building with a square footprint. The interior was illuminated by rows of long rectangular windows on either side. The hipped roof topped off the building and contained a central cupola which rose into a long steeple. This courthouse served the county until 1870, when the county passed a decision for the design a new courthouse.

This design was awarded to H.E. Myer and was in the Italianate style. The building came with a price tag of $106,000 which was raised through taxation and bonds. In 1934, with the aid of WPA funds, the courthouse was renovated with some major changes to the overall look of the building.

A series of ten bonds(1) dated June 15, 1934 for the sum of $2,000 each were sold, a series of thirty bonds(2) dated April 1, 1935 for the sum of $1,000 each and a series of forty bonds(3) dated April 1, 1935 for the sum of $1,000 each were sold for the purpose of providing funds for permanently fireproofing, enlarging and improving the courthouse.

A series of twenty bonds(4) dated September 1, 1947 for the sum of $1,000 each were sold for the purpose of reconstructing the roof and repairing and reconstructing the interior of the courthouse.

(1) Numbered 1 - 10 at 5% interest (2) Numbered 1 - 30 at 3% interest (3) Numbered 1 - 40 at 3% interest (4) Numbered 1 - 20 at 1 1/4% interest

== Exterior ==
The two-story smooth stone building stands facing S. Market Street with Lincoln Way, or U.S. Route 30, to its side. The building's main entrance is located in a central projection and is reached by a flight of stairs. To either side of the projection are two long arched windows on the main floor with two smaller arched windows located in the basement floors. The second floor windows are massive and contain a long rectangular window topped with a fanlight.

On either side of the door in the central projection is a Doric column supporting the balcony above. Decorative brackets line the underside of the balcony and globe lights adorn the top. Above this balcony is a large recessed arch containing long rectangular windows which are crowned by a circular window. A tower tops the projection and is capped by a dome which is surmounted by a statue of Justice.

The roof was once in the mansard style and contained several courtrooms. The renovation of the WPA removed the roofline and changed it to the present flat roof.
