= 194th Division =

194th Division may refer to:

- 194th Division (People's Republic of China)
- 194th Rifle Division, Soviet Union

== See also ==
- List of military divisions by number
- 194th Brigade (disambiguation)
- 194th Regiment (disambiguation)
- 194th (disambiguation)
