= William McKinley Sr. =

American businessman (1807–1892)

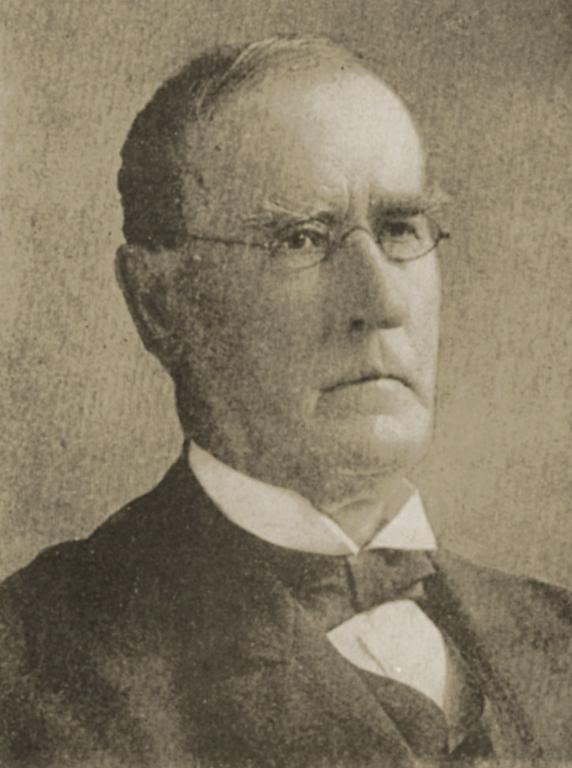
- Born: William McKinley; November 15, 1807; Pine Township, Pennsylvania, U.S.
- Died: November 24, 1892 (aged 85); Canton, Ohio, U.S.
- Resting place: Westlawn Cemetery
- Occupation: Pig iron manufacturer
- Spouse: Nancy Campbell Allison McKinley
- Children: 9, including William Jr.
- Parent(s): James McKinley (1783–1847) and Mary Rose McKinley

William McKinley Sr. (November 15, 1807 – November 24, 1892) was an American manufacturer. He was a pioneer of the iron industry in eastern Ohio as well as the father of President William McKinley.

== Life ==
McKinley was born to James S. McKinley and Mary Rose in Pine Township, Mercer County, Pennsylvania, on November 15, 1807. The second of 13 children, he moved to Lisbon, Ohio, in 1809. Working in the iron business, as had his father, McKinley operated foundries in New Lisbon, Niles, Poland, and finally Canton. He married Nancy Allison Campbell on January 6, 1829. His parents, James S. and Mary Rose McKinley, both died in South Bend, Indiana, on August 20, 1847.

McKinley Sr. was a Whig and later a Republican party member, and an "ardent advocate" for a protective tariff. McKinley kept a Bible, the works of Dante Alighieri, and Shakespeare with him consistently and used what little time of leisure was allocated from his work to read.

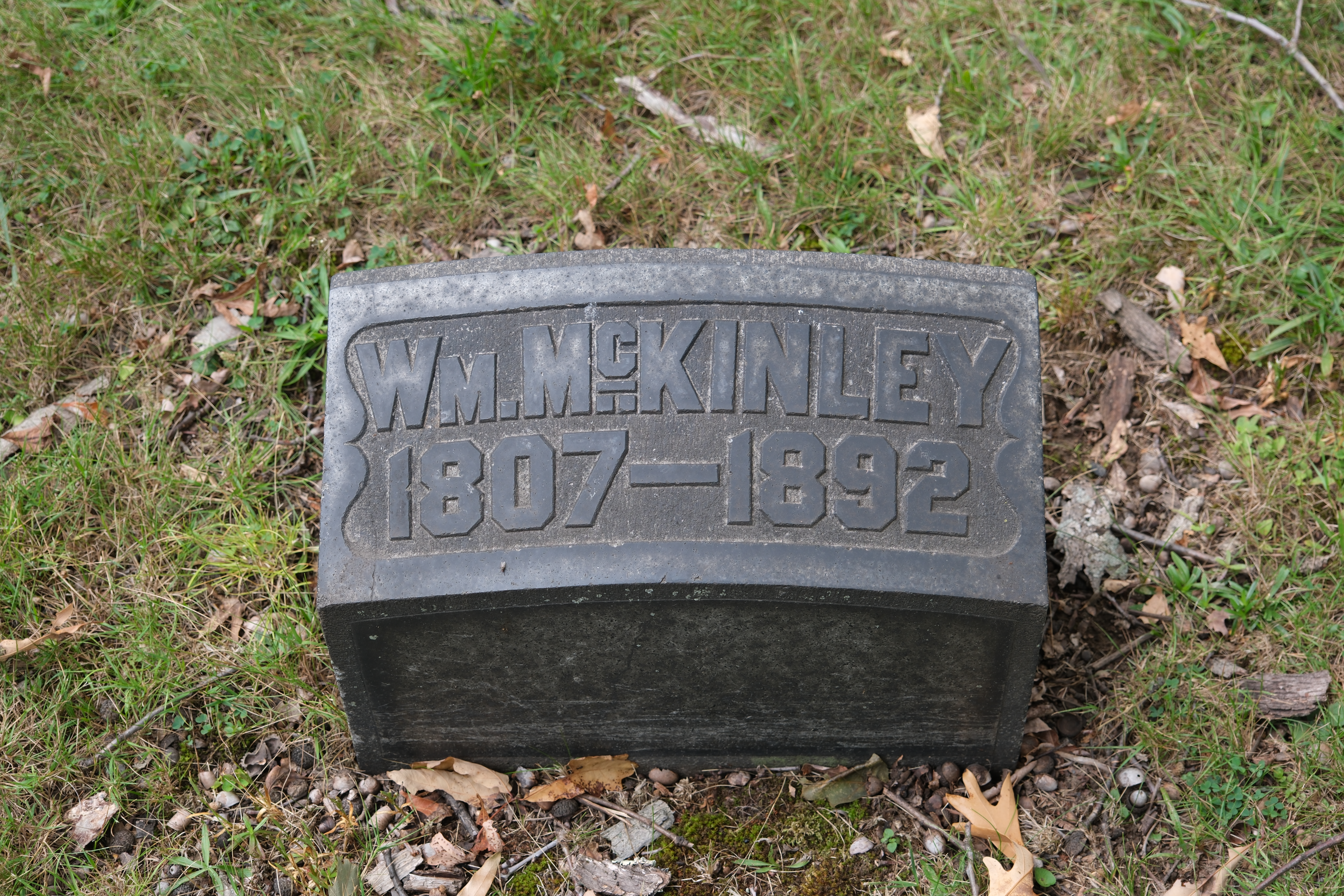
Marker of McKinley at West Lawn Cemetery

McKinley died in Canton, Ohio, on November 24, 1892, at age 85. He had eight other children:

- David Allison McKinley (1829–1892)
- Anna McKinley (1832–1890)
- James Rose McKinley (1833–1889)
- Mary McKinley (1835–1868)
- Helen Minerva McKinley (1834–1924)
- Sarah McKinley (1840–1931)
- Abigail Celia McKinley (1845–1846)
- Abner McKinley (1847–1904)
