= Charles D. Coffin =

American politician

Charles Coffin
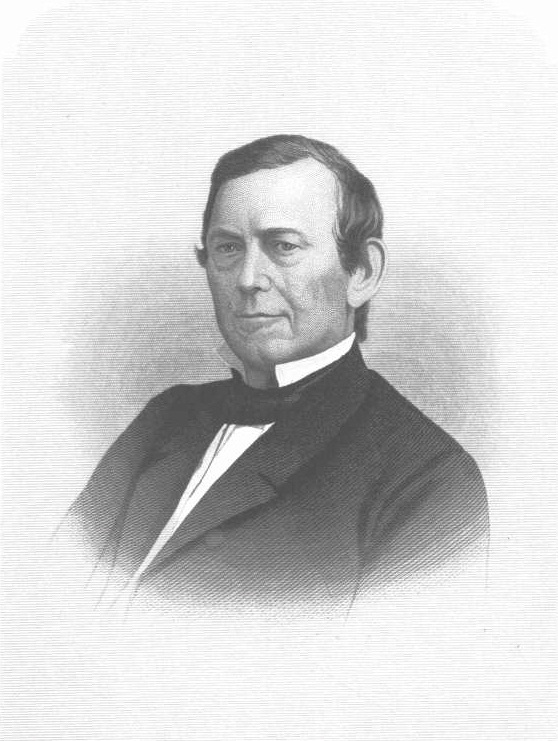

Member of the U.S. House of Representatives from Ohio's 17th district
- In office December 20, 1837 – March 3, 1839
- Preceded by: Andrew W. Loomis
- Succeeded by: John Hastings

Personal details
- Born: Charles Dustin Coffin; September 10, 1804 Newburyport, Massachusetts, U.S.
- Died: February 28, 1880 (aged 75) Cincinnati, Ohio, U.S.
- Resting place: Spring Grove Cemetery
- Party: Whig
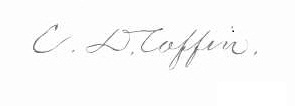
- Signature

Charles Dustin Coffin (September 10, 1804 – February 28, 1880) was an American lawyer and politician who served one term as a U.S. representative from Ohio from 1837 to 1839.

== Biography ==
Born in Newburyport, Massachusetts, Coffin attended the public schools. He then moved with his parents to New Lisbon, Ohio, he studied law. He was admitted to the bar in September 1823 and commenced practice in New Lisbon.

=== Early career ===
He served as clerk of the courts of Columbiana County in 1828.

=== Congress ===
He was elected as a Whig to the Twenty-fifth Congress to fill the vacancy caused by the resignation of Andrew W. Loomis and served from December 20, 1837, to March 3, 1839. He declined to be a candidate for renomination in 1838.

=== Later career ===
He resumed the practice of law and engaged in banking. He served as president of the Columbiana Bank of New Lisbon. He moved to Cincinnati, Ohio, in 1842 and continued the practice of law.

Coffin was elected judge of the superior court in 1845 and served seven years. He was appointed to the same position by Governor Denison in 1861.

=== Death and burial ===
He died in Cincinnati, Ohio, February 28, 1880. He was interred in Spring Grove Cemetery.

== Sources ==
- United States Congress. "Charles D. Coffin (id: C000587)". Biographical Directory of the United States Congress.

U.S. House of Representatives
| Preceded by John Thomson | Member of the U.S. House of Representatives from Ohio's 17th congressional district December 20, 1837 - March 3, 1839 | Succeeded by Charles D. Coffin |
