= 194th =

194th may refer to:

- 194th Armored Brigade, assigned to the US Army's Combat Developments Command to test new materiel at Fort Ord, California
- 194th Battalion (Edmonton Highlanders), CEF, a unit in the Canadian Expeditionary Force during the First World War
- 194th Engineer Brigade, a combat engineer brigade of the United States Army based at Jackson, Tennessee
- 194th Fighter Squadron, an aviation unit of the California Air National Guard
- 194th Intelligence Squadron, an intelligence unit of the United States Air Force
- 194th Ohio Infantry Regiment (or 194th OVI), an infantry regiment in the Union Army during the American Civil War
- 194th (2/1st South Scottish) Brigade, a World War I infantry unit
- 194th Wing, a regional support unit at Camp Murray, Washington

== See also ==
- 194 (number)
- AD 194, the year 194 (CXCIV) of the Julian calendar
- 194 BC
