= Hugh Knox =

American football player (1883–1936)

Profile
- Position: Halfback

Personal information
- Born: c. 1886; Allegheny, Pennsylvania
- Died: January 2, 1936 (aged 49–50); Ithaca, New York

Career information
- College: Yale University

Awards and highlights
- All-American, 1906

Hugh Smith Knox (January 27, 1883 – January 2, 1936) was an American football player. He played at the halfback position at Yale University and was selected as a first-team All-American in 1906.

Knox was the son of Philander C. Knox, who served as the U.S. Secretary of State under William Howard Taft and U.S. Attorney General under William McKinley and Theodore Roosevelt He attended Allegheny Prep School before enrolling at Yale University.

While he was a student at a private school in Connecticut, Knox was arrested and charged in May 1903 with assault. The complainant alleged that he had been beaten badly by a group of young men, which included Knox. Because his father was the U.S. Attorney General, the case received coverage in the press. Knox was put on trial in Norwalk, Connecticut, and he was found not guilty.

Knox graduated in 1907 from Yale University, where he was a member of Skull and Bones. At Yale, Knox played at the halfback position for Yale's football teams in 1905 and 1906. In Yale's 6–0 victory over Harvard in 1906, Knox was credited with a 40-yard run that was considered one of the most exciting plays of the 1906 season. The New York Times called it a "magnificent effort" and a "beautiful run" and described Knox "swerving in and picking his way through the broken field ahead, ... dodging one and another of the oncoming Cambridge men."

At the conclusion of the 1906 season, Knox was selected as a first-team All-American halfback by both Walter Camp, Caspar Whitney, the New York World and the New York Mail. The New York Times wrote that Knox was "as useful as any man on the field in general work."

Knox later served as the private secretary to his father while he served as the U.S. Secretary of State. In 1910, Knox traveled incognito to Southern California to visit with Yale football legend, Walter Camp. The Los Angeles Times reported on Knox's visit as follows: "Short of stature, he bears a striking resemblance to his distinguished father, with the same restless dark eyes and dark hair growing sparse on the forehead. Mr. Knox is a bachelor and has not had the romantic marital history of his two younger brothers."

In December 1911, Knox was married at New York's Fifth Avenue Presbyterian Church to Katherine McCook, the daughter of Anson G. McCook, a member of the "Fighting McCooks," one of the most prolific military families during the American Civil War. The couple planned to live in Washington, D.C.

Knox died in 1936 in Ithaca, New York.

== See also ==
- 1906 College Football All-America Team
