= Joseph Cable =

American politician (1801–1880)

Member of the U.S. House of Representatives from Ohio's 17th district
- In office March 4, 1849 – March 3, 1853
- Preceded by: George Fries
- Succeeded by: Wilson Shannon

Personal details
- Born: April 17, 1801 Jefferson County, Northwest Territory
- Died: May 1, 1880 (aged 79) Paulding, Ohio, U.S.
- Resting place: Live Oak Cemetery
- Party: Democratic

Joseph Cable (April 17, 1801 – May 1, 1880) was an American lawyer and politician who served as a U.S. representative from Ohio for two terms from 1849 to 1853. He was the great-grandfather of Congressman John Levi Cable.

== Life and career ==
Born in Jefferson County, then in the Territory Northwest of the River Ohio (now in the State of Ohio), Cable attended the public schools. He studied law. He was admitted to the bar and commenced practice in Jefferson County. He established and published the Jeffersonian and Democrat at Steubenville, Ohio, in 1831 and later the Ohio Patriot at New Lisbon, Ohio.

=== Congress ===
Cable was elected as a Democrat to the Thirty-first and Thirty-second Congresses (March 4, 1849 – March 3, 1853), while living in Carroll County. He was not a candidate for renomination in 1852.

=== Later life ===
He moved to Sandusky, Ohio, in 1853 and published the Daily Sandusky Minor, until moving to Van Wert in 1857 and establishing the American and later the Bulletin. After a time living in Wauseon and publishing the Wauseon Republican, he moved to Paulding, where he published the Political Review.

== Death ==
He died on May 1, 1880, and was interred in Live Oak Cemetery.

U.S. House of Representatives
Preceded by George Fries	United States Representative from Ohio's 17th congressional district 1849–1853	Succeeded by Wilson Shannon
