= Hanna–Kenty House =

Historic house in Ohio, United States

- U.S. National Register of Historic Places
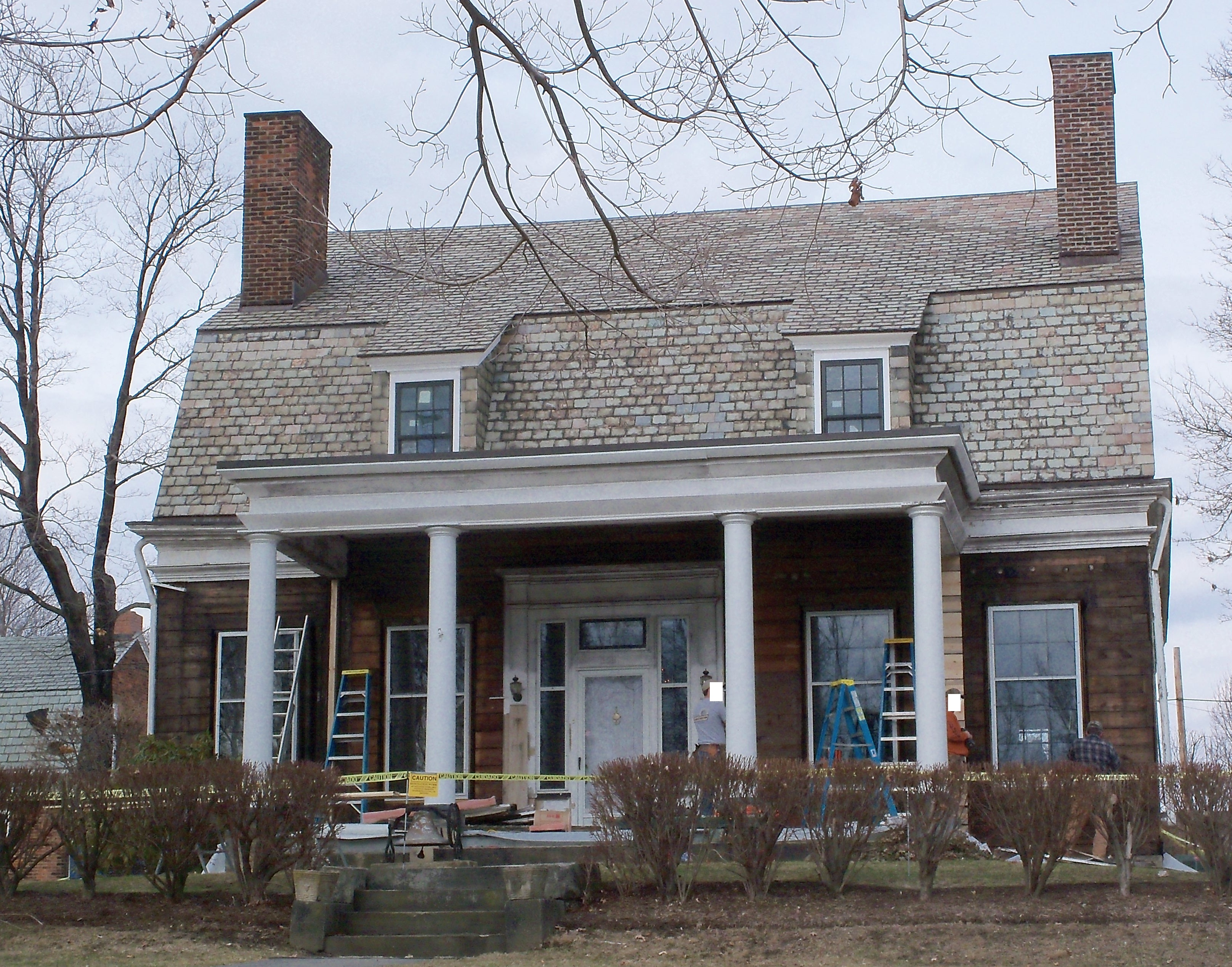
- The Hanna–Kenty House

- Location within Ohio Location within the United States
- Location: 251 E. High St., Lisbon, Ohio
- Coordinates: 40°47′3″N 80°45′51″W
- Area: 1 acre (0.40 ha)
- Built: 1838
- Built by: Reynolds, Samuel; Orth, George S. & Brother
- Architectural style: Federal, Colonial Revival
- NRHP reference No.: 01001257
- Added to NRHP: November 21, 2001

The Hanna–Kenty House is located at 251 E. High St. in Lisbon, Ohio, United States. It is also known as the Marcus Hanna Boyhood Home.

The home is recognized for its local architectural significance. It combines the early 19th century Federal style and the early 20th century Colonial Revival style. It was added to the National Register of Historic Places in 2001.

The house was built in 1838 from a design specified in a contract between the builder, Samuel Reynolds, and the owner, Leonard Hanna, the house was remodeled in 1907.

Dr. Leonard Hanna was an abolitionist and campaigner for temperance. His son, Marcus managed President William McKinley’s campaign tours in 1896 and 1900, and was national chairman of the Republican party. In 1898, he was appointed senator and was elected to the position in 1902.

The house is now owned by Mabel Primm.
