= John Hastings (Ohio politician) =

American politician

Member of the U.S. House of Representatives from Ohio's 17th district
- In office March 4, 1839 – March 4, 1843
- Preceded by: Charles D. Coffin
- Succeeded by: William C. McCauslen

Personal details
- Born: 1778 Kingdom of Ireland
- Died: December 8, 1854 (aged 75–76) Hanoverton, Ohio, U.S.
- Resting place: Grove Hill Cemetery, Hanoverton, Ohio
- Party: Democratic

John Hastings (1778 – December 8, 1854) was a 19th-century American lawyer and politician who served two terms as a U.S. representative from Ohio from 1839 to 1843.

== Biography ==
Born in the Kingdom of Ireland in 1778, Hastings engaged in agricultural pursuits, while studying law in Lisbon, Ohio.

=== Early career ===
He was admitted to the bar and practiced in Mississippi.

He returned to Ohio and settled in Hanover Township, Columbiana County, Ohio, where once again, he engaged in agricultural pursuits.

=== Congress ===
Hastings was elected as a Democrat to the Twenty-sixth and Twenty-seventh Congresses (March 4, 1839 – March 4, 1843).

=== Death and burial ===
He died near Hanoverton, Ohio, December 8, 1854 and was interred in Grove Hill Cemetery.

== Sources ==
- United States Congress. "John Hastings (id: H000328)". Biographical Directory of the United States Congress.

U.S. House of Representatives
Preceded by Charles D. Coffin	Member of the U.S. House of Representatives from Ohio's 17th congressional district March 4, 1839 – March 3, 1843	Succeeded by William C. McCauslen
