= 276 BC =

276 BC in various calendars
Gregorian calendar	276 BC; CCLXXVI BC
Ab urbe condita	478
Ancient Egypt era	XXXIII dynasty, 48
Pharaoh	Ptolemy II Philadelphus, 8
Ancient Greek Olympiad (summer)	126th Olympiad (victor)¹
Assyrian calendar	4475
Balinese saka calendar	N/A
Bengali calendar	−869 – −868
Berber calendar	675
Buddhist calendar	269
Burmese calendar	−913
Byzantine calendar	5233–5234
Chinese calendar	甲申年 (Wood Monkey); 2422 or 2215 — to — 乙酉年 (Wood Rooster); 2423 or 2216
Coptic calendar	−559 – −558
Discordian calendar	891
Ethiopian calendar	−283 – −282
Hebrew calendar	3485–3486
- Hindu calendars
Vikram Samvat	−219 – −218
Shaka Samvat	N/A
Kali Yuga	2825–2826
Holocene calendar	9725
Iranian calendar	897 BP – 896 BP
Islamic calendar	925 BH – 924 BH
Javanese calendar	N/A
Julian calendar	N/A
Korean calendar	2058
Minguo calendar	2187 before ROC 民前2187年
Nanakshahi calendar	−1743
Seleucid era	36/37 AG
Thai solar calendar	267–268
Tibetan calendar	阳木猴年 (male Wood-Monkey) −149 or −530 or −1302 — to — 阴木鸡年 (female Wood-Rooster) −148 or −529 or −1301

Year 276 BC was a year of the pre-Julian Roman calendar. At the time it was known as the Year of the Consulship of Gurges and Clepsina (or, less frequently, year 478 Ab urbe condita). The denomination 276 BC for this year has been used since the early medieval period, when the Anno Domini calendar era became the prevalent method in Europe for naming years.

== Events ==
=== By place ===
==== Egypt ====
- The Egyptian King Ptolemy II's first wife, Arsinoe I (daughter of the late King Lysimachus of Thrace) is accused, probably at instigation of Ptolemy II's sister (who also has the name Arsinoe), of plotting his murder and is exiled by the King. Arsinoe then marries her own brother, a customary practice in Egypt, but scandalous to the Greeks. The suffix "Philadelphoi" ("Brother-Loving") consequently is added to the names of King Ptolemy II and Queen Arsinoe II. The former queen, Arsinoe I, is banished to Coptos, a city of Upper Egypt near the Wadi Hammamat, while her rival adopts her children.
- The first of the Syrian Wars starts between Egypt's Ptolemy II and Seleucid emperor Antiochus I Soter. The Egyptians invade northern Syria, but Antiochus defeats and repels his opponent's army.

==== Greece ====
- Antigonus II Gonatas consolidated his control over Macedon and Thessaly.

==== Sicily ====
- Pyrrhus negotiates with the Carthaginians to end the fighting between them in Sicily. The Carthaginians are inclined to come to terms with Pyrrhus, but he demands that Carthage abandon all of Sicily and make the Libyan Sea the boundary between Carthage and the Greeks. Meanwhile, he begins to display despotic behaviour towards the Sicilian Greeks and soon Sicilian opinion moves against him. Therefore, fearing that his successes in Sicily may lead him to become the despot of their country, the Syracusans ask Pyrrhus to leave Sicily. He does so, and returns to the Italian mainland, noting that he expects Sicily to be a "fair wrestling ring" for Carthage and Rome.

==== China ====
- General Bai Qi of the State of Qin attacks the State of Wei and captures two cities.
- General Lian Po of the State of Zhou captures the Wei city of Qi.

== Births ==
- Eratosthenes, Greek mathematician, geographer and astronomer (d. 194 BC)
