= Katharine McCook Knox =

American art historian (1889–1983)

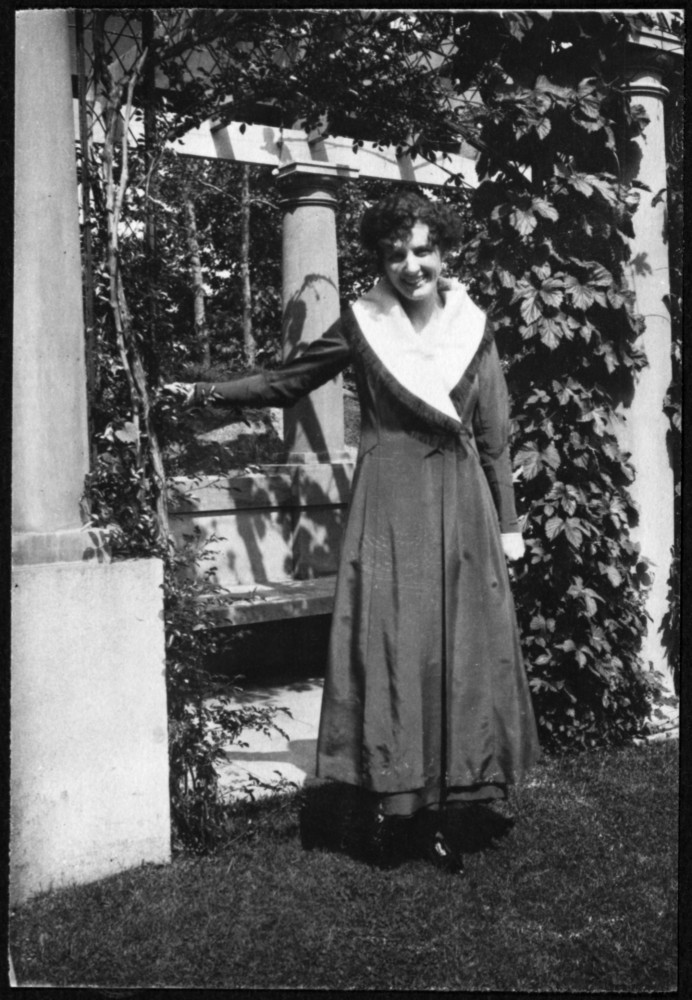
- Born: 1889; Washington, D.C.
- Died: July 9, 1983
- Occupation: Art historian
- Notable work: The Story of the Frick Art Reference Library: The Early Years; The Sharples: Their Portraits of George Washington and his Contemporaries

Katharine McCook Knox (1889–1983) was an American art historian, best known for her history of the Frick Art Reference Library, and for curatorial work on presidential portraits.

== Personal life ==
Katharine McCook was born in Washington, D.C., in 1889 and was raised in New York City. Her parents were Anson George McCook, a Civil War general and Secretary of the Senate from New York, and Hettie Beatty. In 1911, she married Hugh Smith Knox, the son of Senator Philander Chase Knox, but divorced in 1916. She had one daughter, Kathleen Knox Smith.

== Career ==
Knox is known for her history of the Frick Art Reference Library, and for her work on presidential portraits, particularly on George Washington and Abraham Lincoln. Early in her career, she catalogued works of art in the White House art collection during the Herbert Hoover administration. She also served as consultant for exhibitions at the Smithsonian Institution, the Phillips Collection, the Textile Museum, the National Society Daughters of the American Revolution Museum, and the Corcoran Gallery of Art, all in Washington, D.C. She was awarded the Corcoran Gallery of Art's Medal of Merit in 1966. A member of the Washington, D.C., Republican Central Committee and program chair of the League of Republican Women of the District of Columbia, she rediscovered a portrait by G. P. A. Healy of Abraham Lincoln, and convinced the U. S. Post Office to select it for a commemorative stamp during the Lincoln Sesquicentennial celebration in 1959. In honor of this discovery, the Lincoln Sesquicentennial Commission awarded Knox the Abraham Lincoln medallion in 1960. She served as a consultant in 1963 for the book published by the United States Capitol Historical Society about the U.S. Capitol, We, the People. Knox was a Trustee of the Frick Art Reference Library.

Knox died in Washington, D.C., on July 10, 1983.

== Publications ==
- Knox, Katherine McCook. 1932. "Washington and his associates". American Magazine of Art. XXIV (6): 399–408. OCLC 34529111
- Surprise Personalities in Georgetown, D.C. 1958.
- The Story of the Frick Art Reference Library : The Early Years New York: The Library. 1979.
- The Sharples: Their Portraits of George Washington and his Contemporaries: A Diary and an Account of the Life and Work of James Sharples and his Family in England and America. New York Kennedy Graphics. 1972. OCLC 2339340
