= Andrew W. Loomis =

American politician

Member of the U.S. House of Representatives from Ohio's 17th district
- In office March 4, 1837 – October 20, 1837
- Preceded by: John Thomson
- Succeeded by: Charles D. Coffin

Personal details
- Born: Andrew Williams Loomis; June 27, 1797 Lebanon, Connecticut
- Died: August 24, 1873 (aged 76) Cumberland, Maryland
- Resting place: Allegheny Cemetery, Pittsburgh, Pennsylvania
- Party: Whig
- Education: Union College

Andrew Williams Loomis (June 27, 1797 – August 24, 1873) was a 19th-century American lawyer who served as a U.S. representative from Ohio during the year 1837.

== Biography ==
Born in Lebanon, Connecticut, Loomis earned his law degree from Union College, Schenectady, New York, in 1819. He was admitted to the bar, and moved to Canton, Ohio to practice law. He then moved to New Lisbon (now Lisbon), Ohio. He served as delegate to the National-Republican State convention in 1827 and 1828.

=== Congress ===
Loomis was elected as a Whig to the Twenty-fifth Congress and served from March 4, 1837, until October 20, 1837, when he resigned.

=== Later career ===
He then relocated to Pittsburgh, Pennsylvania in 1839, and resumed his legal practice. He served as member of the Peace Conference of 1861 held in Washington, D.C., in an effort to devise means to prevent the impending war.

Sometime around 1868, he moved to Cleveland, Ohio.

== Death and interment ==
Loomis died while on a visit to Cumberland, Maryland on August 24, 1873. He was interred in the Allegheny Cemetery, in Pittsburgh, Pennsylvania.

== Sources ==
- United States Congress. "Andrew W. Loomis (id: L000436)". Biographical Directory of the United States Congress.

U.S. House of Representatives
Preceded by John Thomson	Member of the U.S. House of Representatives from Ohio's 17th congressional district March 4, 1837 – October 20, 1837	Succeeded by Charles D. Coffin
