= The Ohio Patriot =

The Ohio Patriot was one of the earliest newspapers created in the United States, being the first paper published west of Pittsburgh, Pennsylvania. The paper was created in the town of New Lisbon, Ohio. Founded by an Alsatian immigrant, William D. Lepper, its first appearance was given the name Der Patriot am Ohio and was originally issued as a weekly German publication. However, due to lack of support, the Hanover native converted the paper to its more recognized form today as The Ohio Patriot.

Originally, the paper consisted of a small German sheet published in the latter part of 1808. In early 1809, Mr. Lepper began the publication of The Ohio Patriot, in English, and continued its issue until 1833. It was later sold to other investors who evolved the publication into a much larger and widely circulated paper. The paper remained in circulation until well into the late 19th century.
