= Lisbon Exempted Village School District =

School district in Ohio

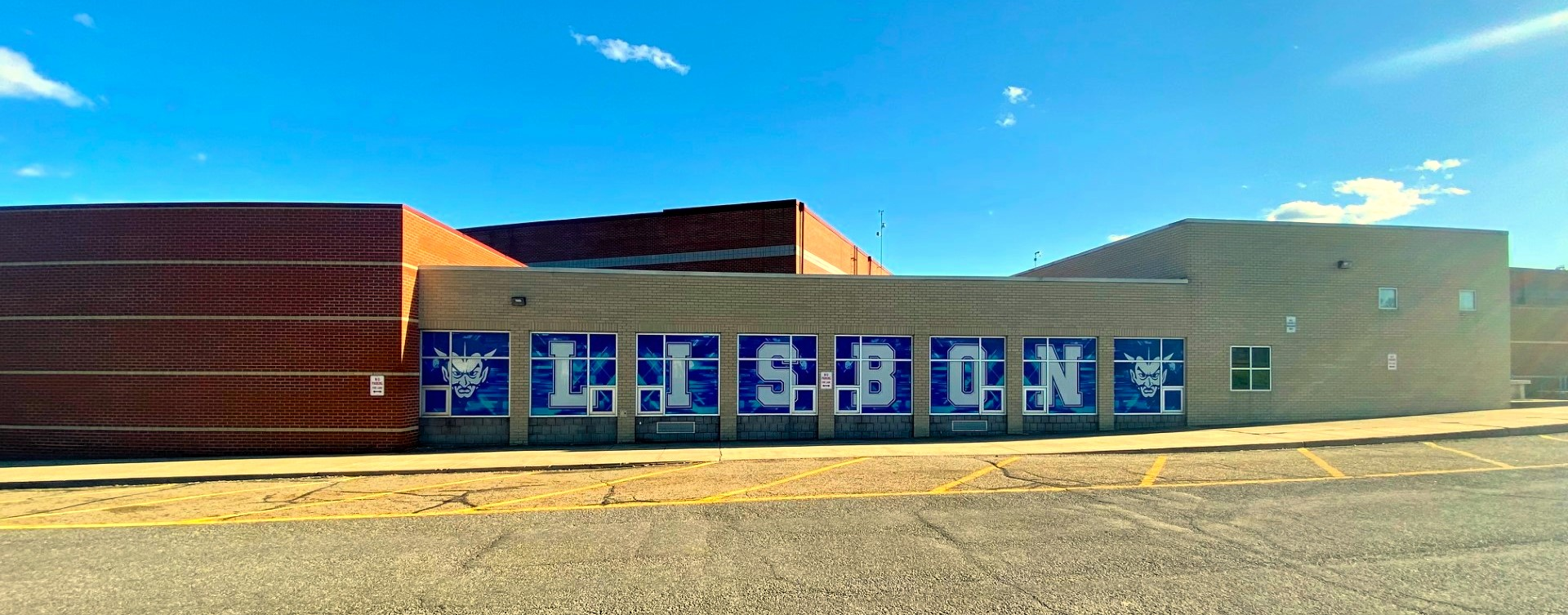

Address
- 317 N Market Street Lisbon, Ohio, 44432; United States
- Coordinates: 40°46′29″N 80°46′06″W

District information
- Type: Public school district
- Grades: K-12
- Superintendent: Joseph Siefke
- School board: Lisbon Board of Education
- NCES District ID: 3904545

Students and staff
- Enrollment: 782 (2020-2021)
- Faculty: 51.00 (on an FTE basis)
- Student–teacher ratio: 15.33

Other information
- Website: www.lisbon.k12.oh.us

The Lisbon Exempted Village School District is a public school district serving the Lisbon area in central Columbiana County in the U.S. state of Ohio.

David Anderson Junior/Senior High School is the only high school in the district. The schools' sports teams are nicknamed the "Blue Devils". The district's colors are blue and white.

== Schools currently in operation by the school district ==
Current School Name	Current Grades Housed	Additional Info (Additions made, Architect, Current Status, Etc.)
David Anderson Jr./Sr. High School	7–12	
McKinley Elementary School	K-6	-
