= Zach Paxson =

American singer-songwriter

Zach Paxson is a singer-songwriter born and raised in Lisbon, Ohio, United States. He is a second-generation musician who received early guitar instruction from his father, Bruce Paxson, one of the founding members of the touring Bluegrass quartet, Get Out and Push. Paxson has performed with various artists such as Parmalee, Lynyrd Skynyrd, and the Marshall Tucker Band.

== Career ==
Zach recorded his first album Good Luck With That in 2011 at the Beaird Music Group in Nashville, TN On November 5, 2013, Representative Nick Barborak of Lisbon D-5th sponsored House Bill 330 to name "OHIO," one of the songs from Paxson's freshman album, as the State's official country song. The State and Local Government Committee held a hearing at the state capitol on Tuesday, March 11, 2014 where Paxson performed the song. On March 20, 2014 "OHIO", was voted on and subsequently passed through the State and Local Government Committee. It is currently referred to the 130th General Assembly where it awaits passage under House Bill 330 as the official country song of the state of Ohio.

Paxson is currently touring his home state working to gather support for "OHIO." Several cities have already passed resolutions supporting the movement. Paxson wrote the song after attending an Ohio State University football game in 2006.

He released his sophomore album Simple Life in 2013.

On October 15, 2014, Paxson released Twenty-Four/Seven, his third studio album and extended EP produced by rocker-turned-producer Rick Beato at the Black Dog Recording Studio in Stone Mountain, GA. Featuring the hit song "I Work," Paxson released the album as a free download via his website as thanks for the hard-working men and women of America.

== Discography ==
=== Albums ===
- Good Luck with That (2011)
- Simple Life (2012)
- Twenty-Four/Seven (2014)
- The Ohio Way (2016)

=== Singles ===
- Truck Night (2011)
- Honky Donkey (2013)
