= George M. Ashford =

American civil engineer and surveyor

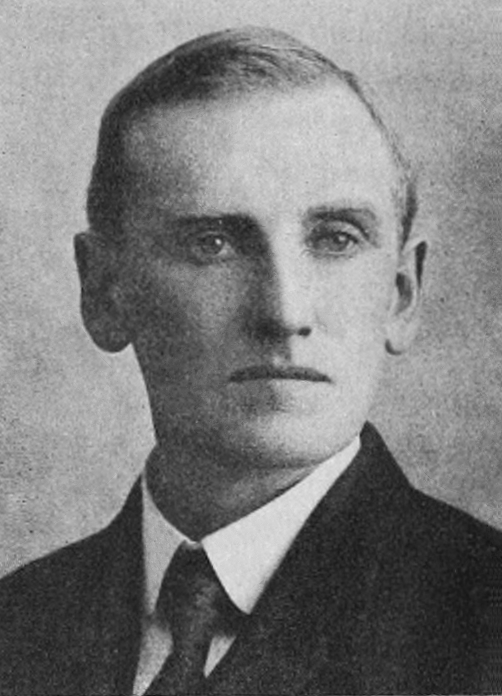
George M. Ashford

George M. Ashford (January 2, 1868–?) was an American civil engineer and surveyor. He was one of the pioneers of Northern Alaska. He was the first man of his profession to arrive in Nome.

== Early years ==
Ashford was born near Lisbon, Ohio, January 2, 1868. When he was eight years old, his family moved to Iowa, and he was educated in the public schools of that state, and was subsequently graduated from the Iowa State College in the class of 1892 with the degree of Bachelors in Civil Engineering.

== Career ==
His first work as an engineer was with the Carnegie Steel Company of Pittsburgh, Pennsylvania. For a period of three or four years, he was an engineer for the Pittsburgh Bridge Company, engaged in the drafting and construction department. He was sent to North Carolina as an engineer in connection with the construction of George W. Vanderbilt's mansion at Biltmore. Ashford was one of the unfortunate stampeders to the Kotzebue Sound area in 1898. At the time of the excitement caused by the report of the discovery of gold in this region, he and 27 others bought a schooner, in which they made the trip to the Arctic country. Ashford spent the winter of 1898 and 1899 on the Kobuk River, a short distance below Squirrel River. In the spring of 1899, the news of the Anvil strike having previously reached the Arctic slope, he started over the ice with two companions for Nome. They hauled their sleds and accomplished the long and arduous journey in a month's time. They left the Kobuk and started across Kotzebue Sound on May 1. This season was unusually late, and while crossing the ice of Kotzebue Sound they encountered extremely severe weather. On the third day out Dr. De France, one of their traveling companions, became exhausted and froze to death. They were ten days on the ice before they reached Cape Espenberg. After reaching the coast of the Bering Sea and crossing Port Clarence Bay, the season was pretty well advanced, it being the latter part of May, and the ice over the sea in many places was rotten and unsafe. At a place above Sinuk River two men, who were traveling with a dog team and following Ashford's party, narrowly escaped being drowned. The dog team, sledge and all of their supplies were lost by the breaking of the ice. Ashford said that when he arrived within 40 miles of Nome, he saw evidence of the "pencil and hatchet" miners. At this early date, the beach for this distance west of Nome was staked. He arrived at Nome May 31 and found a bustling, thriving mining camp. His most serious regret was that he did not have his surveying transit with him, as there was a pressing demand for the services of a surveyor and much work that he could have done if he had had his instruments. During the early part of this season, Ashford became associated with J. M. Davidson, and they did the first work of surveying and engineering that was ever done on Seward Peninsula. Ashford was one of the engineers of the Miocene Ditch Company, and was later connected with most of the important ditch enterprises of this region.
