= David Anderson Junior/Senior High School =

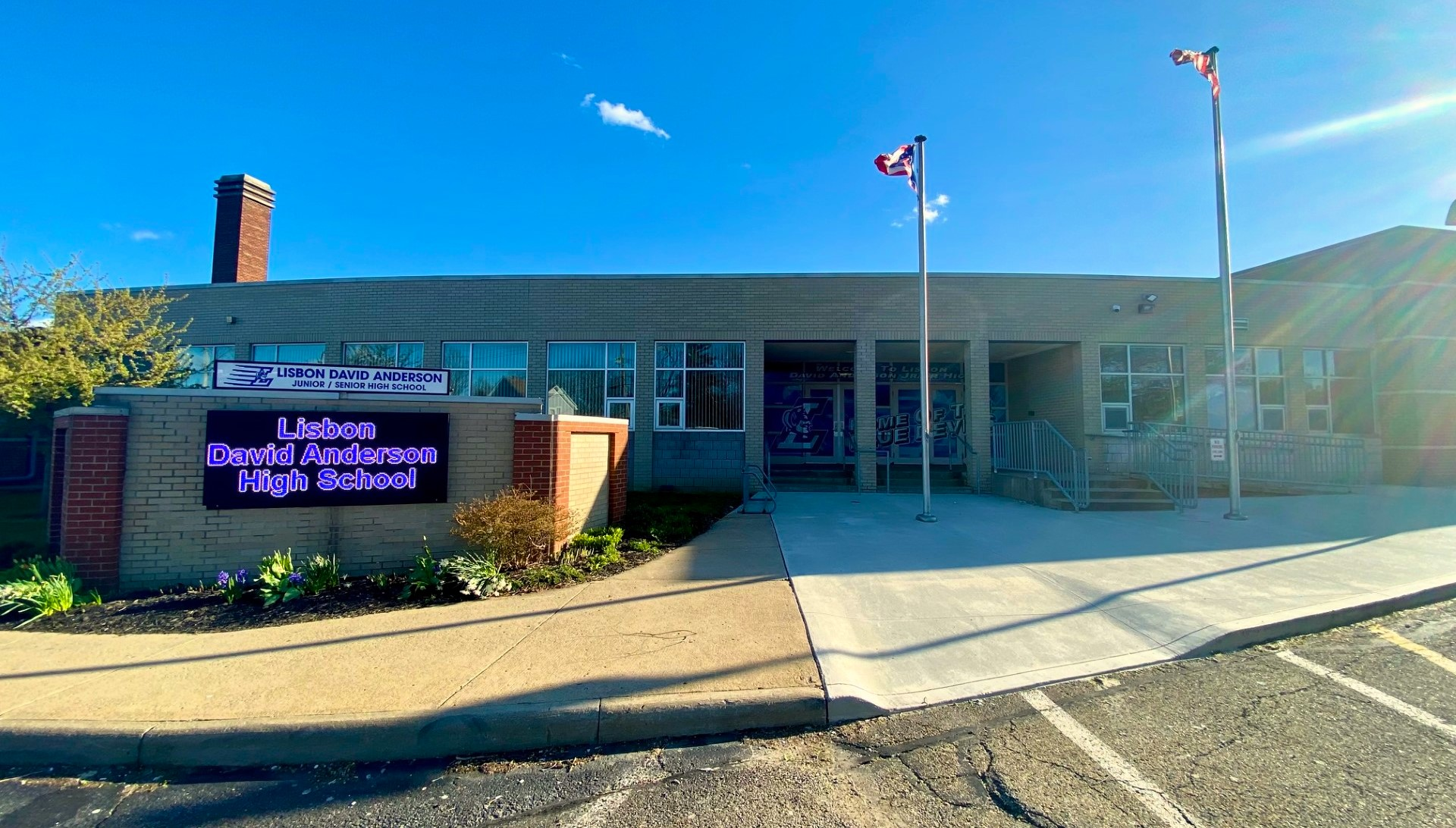

Location
- 260 West Pine Street; Lisbon, Ohio 44432; United States
- Coordinates: 40°46′31″N 80°46′21″W

Information
- Type: Public, Coeducational high school
- Established: 1916
- School district: Lisbon Exempted Village School District
- Superintendent: Joe Siefke
- Principal: Keith Edenfield
- Grades: 6–12
- Colors: Blue and White
- Athletics conference: Eastern Ohio Athletic Conference
- Team name: Blue Devils
- Yearbook: Olympian
- Website: www.lisbon.k12.oh.us

David Anderson Junior/Senior High School is a public high school in Lisbon, Ohio, United States. It is the only high school in the Lisbon Exempted Village School District. Athletic Teams are known as the Blue Devils in the Ohio High School Athletic Association as a member of the Eastern Ohio Athletic Conference.

== Academics ==
David Anderson High School offers courses in the traditional American curriculum. Entering their third and fourth years, students can elect to attend the Columbiana County Career and Technical Center in Lisbon as either a part-time or full-time student.

== Athletics ==
David Anderson High School currently offers:

- Baseball
- Basketball
- Cross country running
- Football
- Golf
- Soccer
- Softball
- Swimming
- Track and field
- Volleyball

=== OHSAA State Championships ===
Football - 1995
