= William C. McCauslen =

American politician

Member of the U.S. House of Representatives from Ohio's 17th district
- In office March 4, 1843 – March 3, 1845
- Preceded by: John Hastings
- Succeeded by: George Fries

Member of the Ohio House of Representatives
- In office 1829-1830; 1832-1833

Personal details
- Born: William Cochran McCauslen; 1796 Steubenville, Northwest Territory
- Died: March 13, 1863 (aged 66–67) Steubenville, Ohio, U.S.
- Resting place: Union Cemetery
- Party: Democratic

Military service
- Allegiance: United States
- Branch/service: United States Army
- Years of service: 1846–1847
- Battles/wars: Mexican–American War

William Cochran McCauslen (1796 – March 13, 1863) was an American lawyer and politician who served for one term as a U.S. representative from Ohio for one term from 1843 to 1845.

== Early life ==
McCauslen was born near Steubenville in the Northwest Territory (in what is now Ohio), and attended the public schools. After he studied law, he was admitted to the bar and practiced in Steubenville.

=== Early career ===
He was a law partner of Secretary of War Stanton. He served as member of the State house of representatives in 1829, 1830, 1832, and 1833. He owned and edited a Democratic newspaper in Steubenville.

== Congress ==
McCauslen was elected as a Democrat to the Twenty-eighth Congress (March 4, 1843 – March 3, 1845).

== Later career and death ==
McCauslen was commissioned on August 31, 1846, during the Mexican War as a captain and commissary of subsistence of the Third Regiment, Ohio Infantry. He was honorably discharged June 24, 1847. He died in Steubenville, Ohio, March 13, 1863 and was interred in Union Cemetery.

== Sources ==
- United States Congress. "William C. McCauslen (id: M000323)". Biographical Directory of the United States Congress.

U.S. House of Representatives
| Preceded by John Hastings | United States Representative from Ohio's 17th congressional district March 4, 1843–March 3, 1845 | Succeeded by George Fries |
Ohio House of Representatives
| Preceded by James Mitchell; Samuel McNary | Representative from Jefferson County; December 7, 1829-December 4, 1831; Served alongside: John Humphrey | Succeeded by John Leetch |
| Preceded by John Leetch | Representative from Jefferson County; December 3, 1832-November 30, 1834; Served alongside: John Leetch; John Schoolar | Succeeded by Mordecai Moore; Peres Sprague |
