= AD 132 =

132 in various calendars
- Gregorian calendar: 132; CXXXII
- Ab urbe condita: 885
- Assyrian calendar: 4882
- Balinese saka calendar: 53–54
- Bengali calendar: −462 – −461
- Berber calendar: 1082
- Buddhist calendar: 676
- Burmese calendar: −506
- Byzantine calendar: 5640–5641
- Chinese calendar: 辛未年 (Metal Goat); 2829 or 2622 — to — 壬申年 (Water Monkey); 2830 or 2623
- Coptic calendar: −152 – −151
- Discordian calendar: 1298
- Ethiopian calendar: 124–125
- Hebrew calendar: 3892–3893
- Hindu calendars
- Vikram Samvat: 188–189
- Shaka Samvat: 53–54
- Kali Yuga: 3232–3233
- Holocene calendar: 10132
- Iranian calendar: 490 BP – 489 BP
- Islamic calendar: 505 BH – 504 BH
- Javanese calendar: 7–8
- Julian calendar: 132; CXXXII
- Korean calendar: 2465
- Minguo calendar: 1780 before ROC 民前1780年
- Nanakshahi calendar: −1336
- Seleucid era: 443/444 AG
- Thai solar calendar: 674–675
- Tibetan calendar: ལྕགས་མོ་ལུག་ལོ་ (female Iron-Sheep); 258 or −123 or −895 — to — ཆུ་ཕོ་སྤྲེ་ལོ་ (male Water-Monkey); 259 or −122 or −894

Year 132 (CXXXII) was a leap year starting on Monday of the Julian calendar. At the time, it was known as the Year of the Consulship of Serius and Sergianus (or, less frequently, year 885 Ab urbe condita). The denomination 132 for this year has been used since the early medieval period, when the Anno Domini calendar era became the prevalent method in Europe for naming years.

== Events ==
=== By place ===
==== Roman Empire ====
- The Temple of Olympian Zeus (Athens) is completed, using Cossutius' design.
- Bar Kokhba Revolt: The messianic, charismatic Jewish leader Simon bar Kokhba starts a war of liberation for Judea against the Romans, which is eventually crushed (in 135) by Emperor Hadrian; Rabbi Akiva is supportive of the rebellion.
- Legio X Fretensis must evacuate Jerusalem, returning to Caesarea. The Jews enter the city, and re-establish their system of sacrifices. They strike coins to celebrate their independence, which will last for only 30 months. Legio XXII Deiotariana, which advanced from Egypt, is completely destroyed.
- Merchants in Britain build structures outside the forts of Hadrian's Wall, and offer goods and services (including brothels) to Roman soldiers, who receive salaries in a region that otherwise has virtually no ready money.
- Construction begins on the Mausoleum of Hadrian in Rome (known today as Castel Sant'Angelo).

==== Asia ====
- Change of era name from Yongjian (7th year) to Yangjia of the Chinese Han dynasty.

=== By topic ===
==== Art and Science ====
- Chinese scientist Zhang Heng invents the first seismometer for determining the exact cardinal direction of earthquakes hundreds of miles away; the device employs a series of complex gears around a central swinging pendulum.

== Births ==
- Cai Yong, Chinese calligrapher and musician (d. 192)
- Han Huandi, emperor of the Han dynasty (d. 168)
- Tao Qian, Chinese official and warlord (d. 194)

== Deaths ==
- Juvenal of Benevento, Roman Christian and saint
- Sun Cheng, Chinese eunuch and politician
