= Union Cemetery-Beatty Park =

Cemetery in Steubenville, Ohio

- U.S. National Register of Historic Places
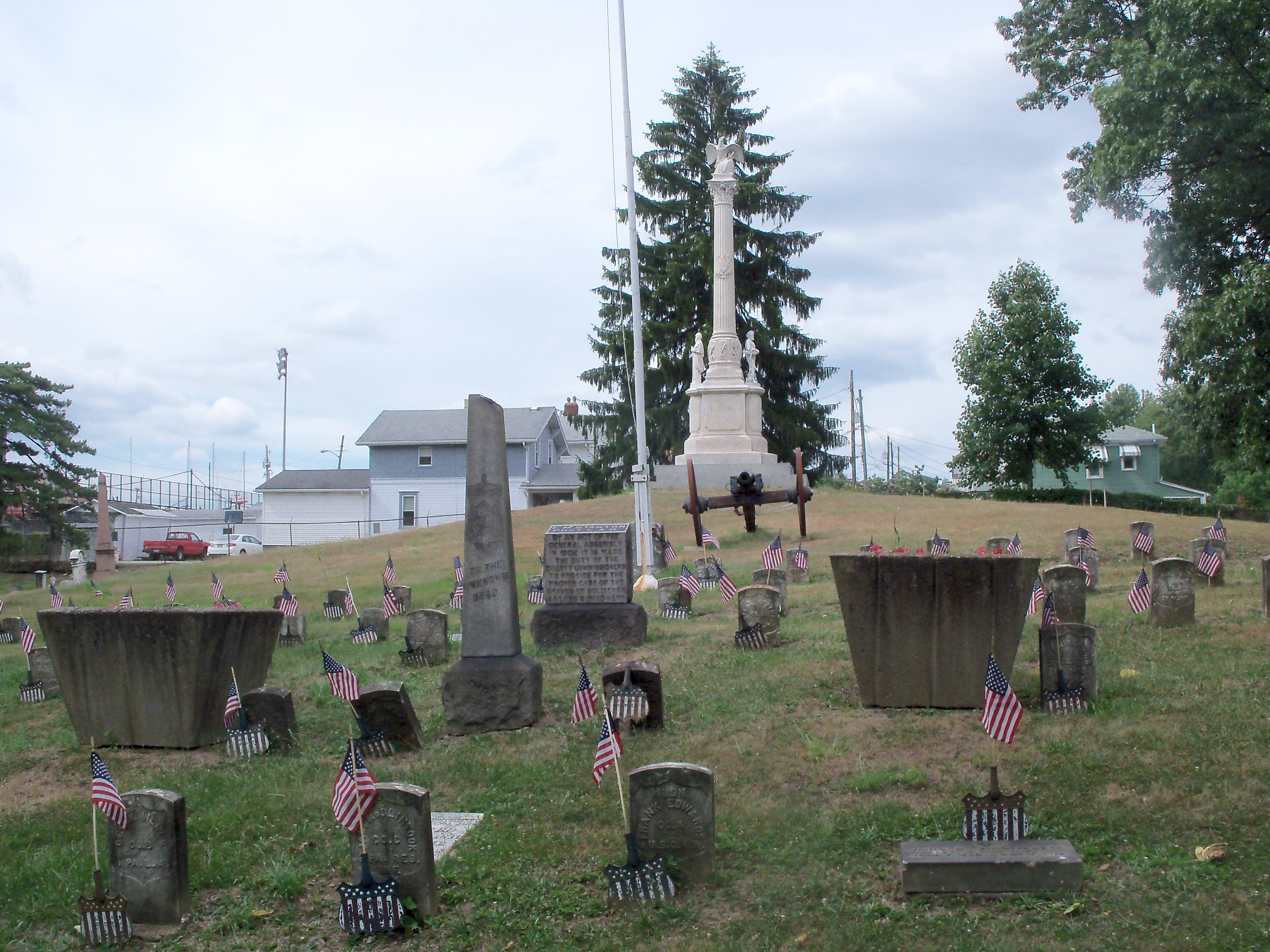
- The Civil War memorial

- Location within Ohio Location within the United States
- Nearest city: Steubenville, Ohio
- Coordinates: 40°22′6″N 80°37′59″W
- Built: 1854
- NRHP reference No.: 86003507
- Added to NRHP: February 27, 1987

Union Cemetery-Beatty Park is a site listed on the National Register of Historic Places in Steubenville, Ohio. Union Cemetery was incorporated as a not for profit in 1854, and through donations and purchase, additional land has been added. That part not suitable for a burial ground was used as a parkland.

This District was added to the National Register of Historic Places on February 27, 1987 for its landscape architecture. The address is 1720 W. Market St. And Lincoln Ave., Steubenville, Ohio.

== Notable interments ==
- Joseph J. Gill (1846–1920), U.S. Representative from Ohio
- William C. McCauslen (1796–1863), U.S. Representative from Ohio
- Anson G. McCook (1835–1917), Union Army colonel and U.S. Representative from Ohio
- B. Frank Murphy (1867–1938), U.S. Representative from Ohio
- Jimmy Snyder (1918–1996), sports commentator
- Samuel Stokely (1796–1861), U.S. Representative from Ohio
- Andrew Stuart (1823–1872), U.S. Representative from Ohio
- Benjamin Tappan (1773–1857), U.S. Senator from Ohio and U.S. district judge
- Bezaleel Wells (1773–1846), Ohio Senate member, founder of Steubenville and Canton
