= Stephen Paxson =

Stephen Paxson (1808–1881) was an American Protestant missionary with the American Sunday School Union. He is known for starting over 1,300 Sunday schools in frontier rural America with a total attendance of about 83,000 and is known as the Apostle to Children and possibly the single biggest influence in evangelizing the American frontier.

== Early life ==
Stephen Paxson was born to Joseph and Mary Lester Paxson in New Lisbon, Ohio, one of seven children. Joseph died when the children were young and poverty forced the mother to find other families to take the children in. Stephen was indentured to Harman Fagan with the promise that he would be permitted to attend school for at least three months a year. However, Stephen had been born with a speech impediment and was dubbed "Stuttering Stephen". Because of his stutter, he never attended school. On the first day, he was so excited that he could not say his name or age. The children laughed, and the teacher returned him home with a note saying not to come back until he could talk. He never received a formal education, but he was inquisitive and determined, so despite having to work constantly, he taught himself to read.

He was also crippled and lame throughout life, living in constant pain. He became a hatmaker and a favorite fiddler for local Saturday night dances.

== Conversion ==
Paxson was not a churchgoer nor a professing Christian in early life, but when he was in his 30s, his daughter Mary begged him to attend church to help her win a gold star. He agreed to go close enough to only put his foot in the door, hoping he would be counted for Mary's prize, but at the door, she pulled him inside. They needed a teacher, and Paxson was pressed into service. The students read from the Bible and Paxson asked questions from a book. He returned. At first, he thought he was a moral man who had no need for salvation, Christ, or the church, but after four years of thinking about the instruction in the Sunday school book, he was personally converted to Christ.

== Ministry with American Sunday School Union ==
After his conversion to Sunday school, his enthusiasm knew no bounds. He soon left his job as a hatmaker, the family sold its home in Winchester, Illinois, and moved to a simple log cabin home on Hickory Hill in Pike County so that he could become a Sunday school missionary. His salary was one dollar a day. Highly motivated, Paxson worked on overcoming his handicaps. He learned to walk without showing his discomfort and overcame stuttering by practicing taking a deep breath and then expelling it slowly, accompanied by hand gestures.

Traveling on horseback, Paxson traveled and ministered in an area stretching from the Great Lakes to the Gulf of Mexico and from the Allegheny Mountains to the Rockies. He made a habit of always stopping to visit every child he met, hoping to persuade them to come to Sunday school. This habit became so ingrained that his horse learned to stop whenever a child was in sight. Because of this, he has been called "the Apostle to the children" (Willis, p. 50) He kept his mind on the goal of establishing a Sunday school in every community, and he seized virtually every opportunity, talking to parents, town leaders, and children. His horse, it is said, automatically turned in at every school and church without command.

During the winter months, travel was impossible on the frontier, so Paxson used those times to visit the larger towns of the East, seeking to start Sunday schools in each community there, and raising funds for the work of the American Sunday School Union, in particular for furnishing mini-libraries of Sunday school books for frontier communities at half cost. This was no idle time. He spoke five nights a week and three to five times on Sunday.

Paxson, hardened to pain through his physical infirmities, endured many hardships. He traveled roads that could barely be called such, over 100,000 miles by horseback in his lifetime. He traveled in all kinds of weather. One of his favorite sayings was "A Sunday school born in a snowstorm will never be scared by a white frost". He had no guaranteed accommodations in his travels. He also endured the hardship of separation from his family for long periods. However, his wife was capable, loving, and devoted, and cared well for the children during these absences.

The Sunday schools he started were Union Sunday schools in which many Christian denominations participated, studying the Bible together. His ministry was extremely fruitful. He once set a record of starting 40 new Sunday schools in 40 days. His ministry extended 40 years through two generations and brought thousands to church. It is said that one man moved house twice in an effort to avoid Paxson and his Sunday schools. When Paxson showed up at the third place to which he had moved, however, he came to hear his lecture and was so moved that he enrolled himself and his seven sons in the Sunday school and gave the first donation toward a Sunday school library.

== Later life and death ==
In his later years, Paxson retired to the home office of the American Sunday School Union in St. Louis. There, he was placed in charge of the Sunday School Book Depository which fulfilled orders for the mini-libraries for which he had so often raised funds. He was very strict about orders being fulfilled on the day they were received. While in St. Louis, he and his family attended Pilgrim Congregational Church and he continued to invite every child he saw to Sunday school. He also wrote to encourage Sunday school conventions whenever he could not attend.

In October 1880, the Paxsons recelebrated their marriage of 50 years at their home in St. Louis. Paxson spent time making scrapbooks of his labors and writing letters of encouragement to others.

Paxson was an invalid for the last three months of his life. Several days before his death, when it was evident he would not recover, his son, Rev. W. P. Paxson, asked him if he should die, if it was all right. Paxson replied, "Why son, that was settled many years ago." He left this message to friends: "I die at my post. All is clear and bright and peaceful. No fear, no tremor, but rest, comfort in God." He died at home in 1881.

== Legacy ==
In his lifetime, Paxson directly started 1,300 frontier Sunday schools and helped in the establishment of 1,700 others. His oldest son, at age 15, joined in his father's missionary work. He went on to establish more than 700 more Sunday schools himself. Paxson has been called "the most important single influence in evangelizing the American frontier".
