= George Fries =

American politician

Member of the U.S. House of Representatives from Ohio's 17th district
- In office March 4, 1845 – March 3, 1849
- Preceded by: William C. McCauslen
- Succeeded by: Joseph Cable

Personal details
- Born: 1799 Pennsylvania, U.S.
- Died: November 13, 1866 (aged 66–67) Cincinnati, Ohio, U.S.
- Resting place: Catholic Cemetery
- Party: Democratic

George Fries (1799 – November 13, 1866) was a medical dictor and a two-term U.S. representative from Ohio from 1845 to 1849.

== Life and career ==
Born in Pennsylvania in 1799, Fries attended the common schools. He studied medicine and commenced practice in Hanoverton, Ohio, in 1833.

=== Congress ===
Fries was elected as a Democrat to the Twenty-ninth and Thirtieth Congresses (March 4, 1845–March 3, 1849). He declined to be a candidate for renomination in 1848.

Fries subsequently moved to Cincinnati, Ohio, and resumed the practice of medicine. He served as the treasurer of Hamilton County, Ohio from 1860 to 1862 during the first years of the American Civil War before retiring from public service.

== Death ==
He died in Cincinnati, Ohio, on November 13, 1866, and was interred in the Catholic Cemetery.

== Sources ==
- United States Congress. "George Fries (id: F000386)". Biographical Directory of the United States Congress.

U.S. House of Representatives
Preceded by William C. McCauslen	Member of the U.S. House of Representatives from Ohio's 17th congressional district March 4, 1845 - March 3, 1849	Succeeded by Joseph Cable
