= John Thomson (Ohio politician) =

American politician (1780–1852)

Member of the U.S. House of Representatives from Ohio
- In office March 4, 1829 – March 3, 1837
- Preceded by: John Sloane
- Succeeded by: Andrew W. Loomis
- Constituency: 12th district (1829–1833); 17th district (1833–1837)
- In office March 4, 1825 – March 3, 1827
- Preceded by: Duncan McArthur
- Succeeded by: William Creighton, Jr.
- Constituency: 6th district

Member of the Ohio Senate from the Columbiana County district
- In office 1817–1821
- Preceded by: John G. Young
- Succeeded by: Gideon Hughes

Member of the Ohio House of Representatives from the Columbiana County district
- In office 1816–1817 Serving with Jacob Roller
- Preceded by: Thomas Rigdon; Robert Stevenson
- Succeeded by: Lewis Kinney; Joseph Richardson; Jacob Roller

Member of the Ohio Senate from the Columbiana, Stark and Wayne counties district
- In office 1814–1816 Serving with Lewis Kinney; Joseph Richardson; John G. Young
- Preceded by: Lewis Kinney; Joseph Richardson
- Succeeded by: District eliminated

Personal details
- Born: November 20, 1780 Kingdom of Ireland
- Died: December 2, 1852 (aged 72) New Lisbon, Ohio, U.S.
- Resting place: Lisbon Cemetery
- Party: Jacksonian
- Occupation: Politician; physician

John Thomson (November 20, 1780 – December 2, 1852), also known as John Thompson, (Note: His name was often spelled as John Thompson by contemporary sources.) was a United States representative from Ohio from 1825 to 1827 and from 1829 to 1837. He served as a member of the Ohio Senate from 1814 to 1815 and from 1817 to 1820. He also served in the Ohio House of Representatives in 1816.

== Early life ==
John Thomson was born on November 20, 1780, in the northern part of the Kingdom of Ireland. He immigrated with his parents to the United States in 1787. They moved to Butler County, Pennsylvania. He studied medicine in Butler County.

== Career ==
In 1806 or 1807, he moved to New Lisbon, Ohio, and practiced medicine. During the War of 1812, Thomson was part of a militia and was promoted to the rank of major general.

Thomson served in the Ohio Senate from 1814 to 1816 and from 1817 to 1820 and in the Ohio House of Representatives in 1816. In 1820, he was appointed by President James Monroe to serve as a judge of the Superior Court of the Arkansas Territory, but he declined the appointment. Thomson was elected to the Nineteenth Congress (March 4, 1825 – March 3, 1827). He was an unsuccessful candidate for reelection in 1826 to the Twentieth Congress. Thomson was elected as a Jacksonian to the Twenty-first and to the three succeeding Congresses (March 4, 1829 – March 3, 1837). He was not a candidate for renomination in 1836.

After his political career, Thomson resumed the practice of medicine.

== Personal life ==
He was a member of the Presbyterian church.

Thomson died on December 2, 1852, in New Lisbon (now Lisbon), Columbiana County, Ohio. He was interred in New Lisbon Cemetery.

== Sources ==
- United States Congress. "John Thomson (id: T000230)". Biographical Directory of the United States Congress.

Ohio Senate
Preceded by Lewis Kinney; Joseph Richardson	Senator from Columbiana, Stark, and Wayne Counties; 1814–1816; Served alongside: Lewis Kinney (1814–1815), Joseph Richardson (1814–1815), John G. Young (1815–1816)	District eliminated
Preceded by John G. Young	Senator from Columbiana County; 1817–1821	Succeeded by Gideon Hughes
Ohio House of Representatives
Preceded by Thomas Rigdon; Robert Stevenson	Representative from Columbiana County; 1816–1817; Served alongside: David Hanna, Jacob Roller	Succeeded by Lewis Kinney; Joseph Richardson; Jacob Roller
U.S. House of Representatives
Preceded by Duncan McArthur	United States Representative from Ohio's 6th congressional district 1825-03-04 – 1827-03-03	Succeeded by William Creighton, Jr.
Preceded by John Sloane	United States Representative from Ohio's 12th congressional district 1829-03-04 – 1833	Succeeded by Robert Mitchell
New district	United States Representative from Ohio's 17th congressional district 1833–1837-03-03	Succeeded by Andrew W. Loomis
