= Pine Township, Mercer County, Pennsylvania =

Township in Pennsylvania, US

Coordinates: 41°09′00″N 80°07′30″W

Pine Township
- Township
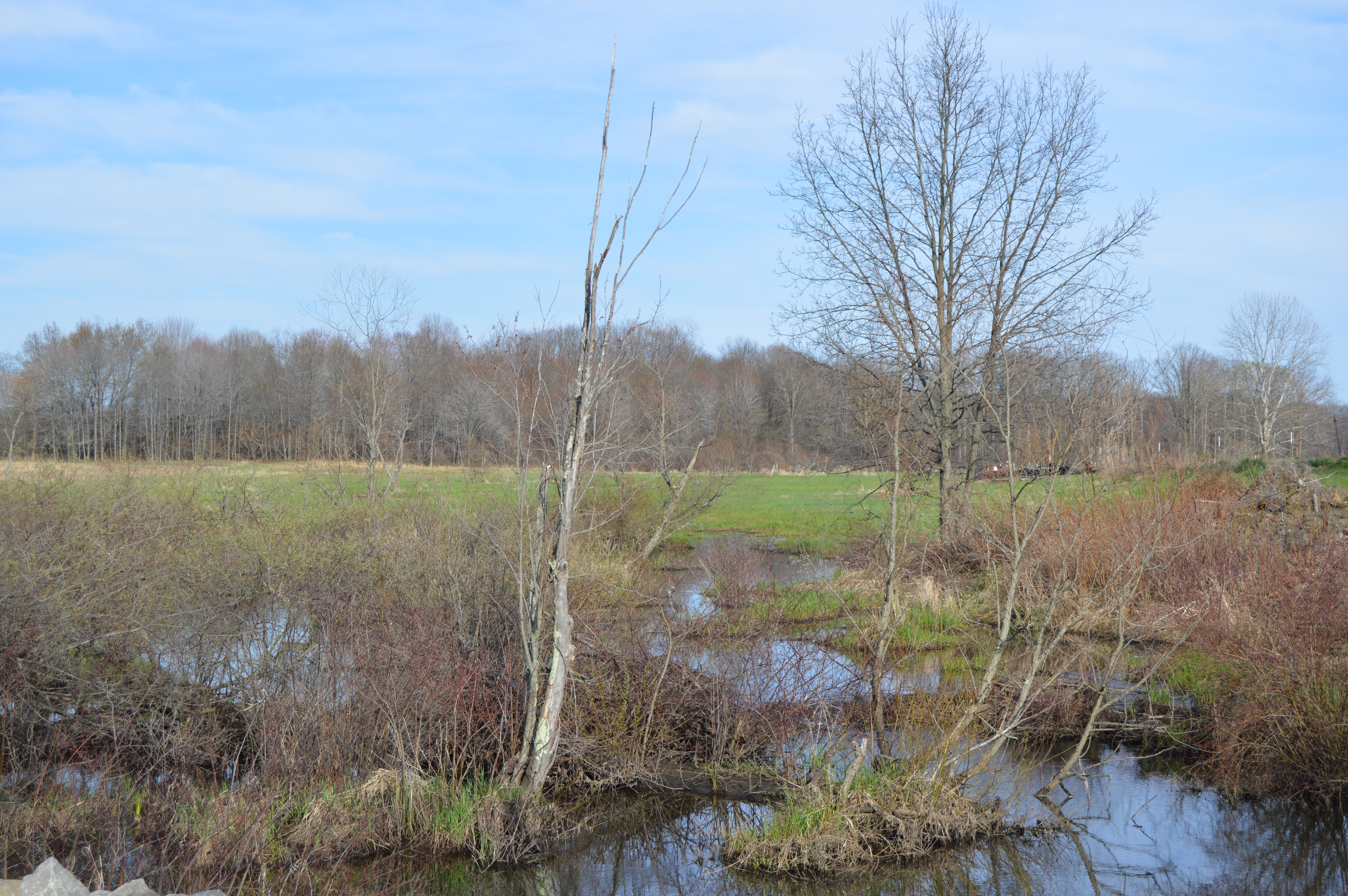
- A stream and fields south of Grove City

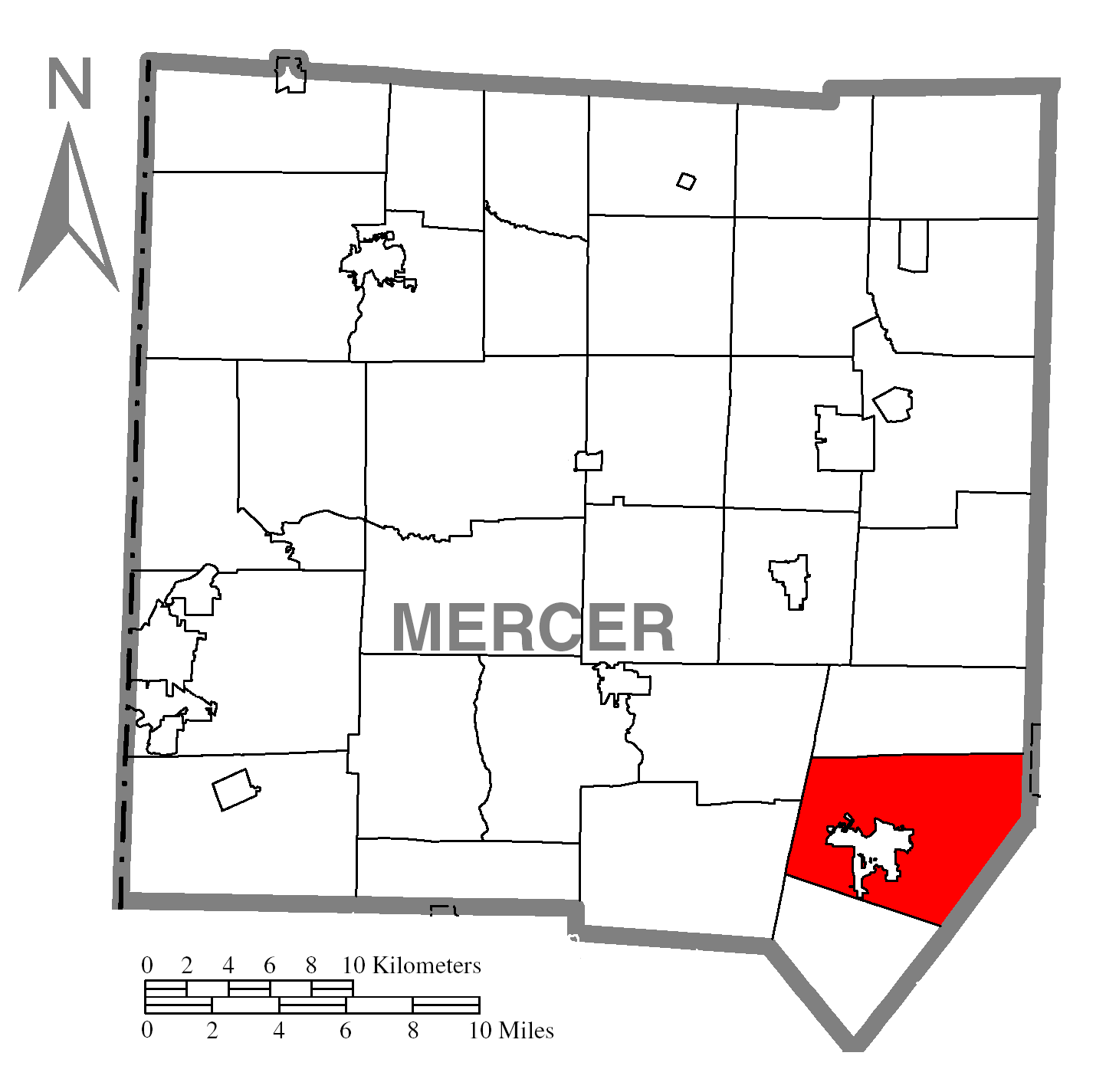
- Location of Pine Township in Mercer County

- Location of Mercer County in Pennsylvania
- Country: United States
- State: Pennsylvania
- County: Mercer
- Established: 1851-02-17

Area
  - Total: 25.68 sq mi (66.51 km^{2})
  - Land: 25.41 sq mi (65.81 km^{2})
  - Water: 0.27 sq mi (0.69 km^{2})

Population (2020)
  - Total: 4,799
  - Estimate (2022): 4,768
  - Density: 198.3/sq mi (76.58/km^{2})
- Time zone: UTC-4 (EST)
  - Summer (DST): UTC-5 (EDT)
- Area code: 724
- FIPS code: 42-085-60336
- Website: https://pinetownshipmc.com/

Historical population
Census	Pop.	Note	%±
2000	4,493		—
2010	5,150		14.6%
2020	4,808		−6.6%
2022 (est.)	4,768		−0.8%
U.S. Decennial Census

Pine Township is a township in Mercer County, Pennsylvania, United States. The population was 4,808 at the 2020 census, down from 5,150 in 2010.

== Geography ==
According to the United States Census Bureau, the township has a total area of 26.0 square miles (67.4 km^{2}), of which 25.7 square miles (66.6 km^{2}) is land and 0.3 square mile (0.8 km^{2}) (1.12%) is water.

== Demographics ==
As of the census of 2000, there were 4,493 people, 1,538 households, and 1,164 families residing in the township. The population density was 174.7 inhabitants per square mile (67.5/km^{2}). There were 1,619 housing units at an average density of 62.9 per square mile (24.3/km^{2}). The racial makeup of the township was 93.23% White, 5.41% African American, 0.56% Asian, 0.09% Pacific Islander, 0.07% from other races, and 0.65% from two or more races. Hispanic or Latino of any race were 1.05% of the population.

There were 1,538 households, out of which 32.6% had children under the age of 18 living with them, 64.6% were married couples living together, 7.8% had a female householder with no husband present, and 24.3% were non-families. 20.7% of all households were made up of individuals, and 9.6% had someone living alone who was 65 years of age or older. The average household size was 2.57 and the average family size was 2.96.

In the township the population was spread out, with 31.0% under the age of 18, 7.1% from 18 to 24, 23.1% from 25 to 44, 23.1% from 45 to 64, and 15.6% who were 65 years of age or older. The median age was 38 years. For every 100 females there were 118.9 males. For every 100 females age 18 and over, there were 98.2 males.

The median income for a household in the township was $41,423, and the median income for a family was $44,694. Males had a median income of $41,597 versus $25,743 for females. The per capita income for the township was $18,015. About 4.8% of families and 5.9% of the population were below the poverty line, including 3.8% of those under age 18 and 4.9% of those age 65 or over.
