= Anson G. McCook =

American politician (1835–1917)

Anson George McCook
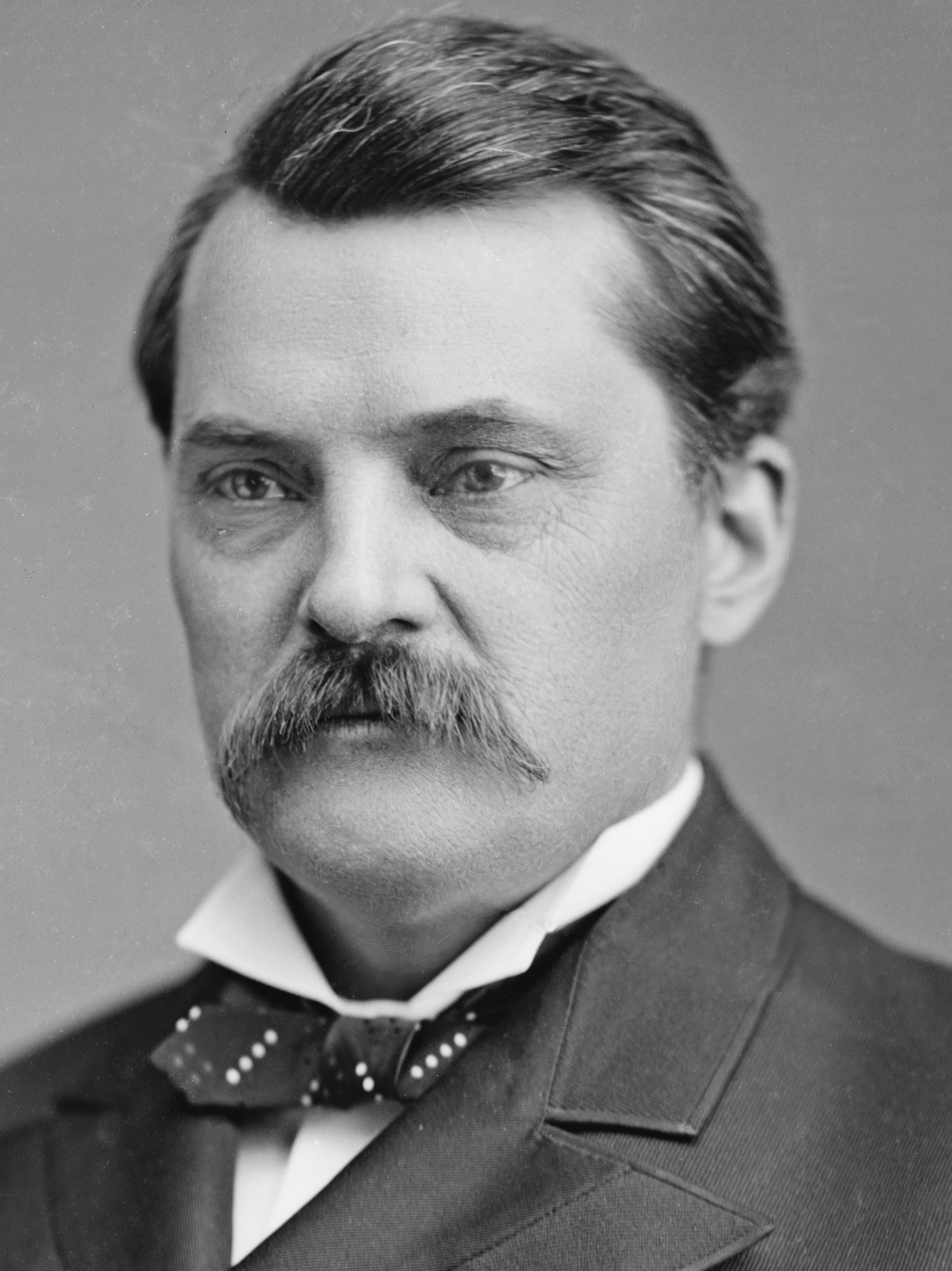
- McCook, 1870–1880

9th Secretary of the United States Senate
- In office December 18, 1883 – August 7, 1893
- Preceded by: Francis Edwin Shober
- Succeeded by: William Ruffin Cox

Member of the U.S. House of Representatives from New York's 8th district
- In office March 4, 1877 – March 3, 1883
- Preceded by: Elijah Ward
- Succeeded by: John J. Adams

Personal details
- Born: October 10, 1835 Steubenville, Ohio, U.S.
- Died: December 30, 1917 (aged 82) New York City, New York, U.S.
- Resting place: Union Cemetery-Beatty Park, Steubenville, Ohio
- Party: Republican

Military service
- Allegiance: United States of America; Union
- Branch/service: United States Army; Union Army
- Years of service: 1861–1865
- Rank: Colonel; Brevet Brigadier General
- Commands: 2nd Ohio Infantry; 194th Ohio Infantry
- Battles/wars: American Civil War * First Battle of Bull Run * Battle of Perryville * Battle of Stones River * Chattanooga campaign * Atlanta campaign * Battle of Peachtree Creek

Anson George McCook (October 10, 1835 – December 30, 1917) was an American military and political figure who served as Union Army colonel during the Civil War. In recognition of his service, in 1866, he was nominated and confirmed for appointment to the grade of brevet brigadier general of volunteers. In civilian life, he was an attorney and three-term reconstruction era U.S. Congressman from New York. He was a member of the “Fighting McCooks,” one of America's most prolific military families during the Civil War.

== Early life and career ==
McCook was born in Steubenville, Ohio on October 10, 1835, to Dr. John McCook and his wife Catherine Julia Sheldon. He was one of five brothers, all of whom would serve as officers in the Civil War. He married Hettie Beatty and had a daughter, Katherine McCook. After receiving his education in the local public schools, McCook traveled via overland train in 1854 to California and spent several years on the Pacific Coast, mostly engaged in mining in California and what became Nevada. Upon his return to Ohio in 1859, he studied law in the family business, Stanton & McCook, and was admitted to the bar. However, he did not get to establish his own legal career as the Civil War erupted and McCook offered his services to the army, following President Abraham Lincoln's call for volunteers to put down the rebellion.

== Civil War ==
McCook enlisted in the 2nd Ohio Infantry, a three-months regiment, and was commissioned as a captain. He saw combat at the First Battle of Bull Run in Northern Virginia. When the regiment was reorganized as a three-years regiment, McCook re-enlisted and was named as major. He was subsequently promoted to lieutenant colonel and then colonel of the 2nd Ohio, serving in the Army of the Cumberland. Among his battles were Perryville, Stones River, Lookout Mountain and Missionary Ridge. During the Atlanta campaign, McCook commanded a brigade of infantry and was distinguished by his actions at the Battle of Peachtree Creek, where his coolness under fire and his tactical leadership won acclaim in the official reports. He was mustered out in late 1864, along with his regiment.

Governor John Brough named McCook as the colonel of the newly raised 194th Ohio Infantry, a one-year regiment which served in the Shenandoah Valley under Philip Sheridan. Again McCook commanded a brigade with efficiency. He was discharged October 11, 1865.

On January 13, 1866, President Andrew Johnson nominated McCook for appointment to the grade of brevet brigadier general of volunteers, to rank from March 13, 1865, and the United States Senate confirmed the appointment on March 12, 1866.

== Postwar career ==
McCook returned to Steubenville following the war and was admitted to the bar in 1866. He served as the U.S. assessor of internal revenue taxes from November 1865 until May 1873, when he moved to New York City, established a law practice, and entered politics. He was the founder and editor of the Daily Register (later known as the New York Law Journal). He served as president of the New York Law Publishing Company until his death. He became close friends with several leading Republicans, including former comrades in arms James Garfield, Rutherford B. Hayes, and Ohio Senator John Sherman.

McCook was elected to the United States House of Representatives in the Forty-fifth Congress as a delegate from Lower Manhattan, and served from 1877 until 1883. He was defeated for a fourth term in the elections of 1882. Among his duties was serving on the House committee that oversaw military affairs. In December 1883, the Republican Caucus elected McCook as the Secretary of the United States Senate, a post he held until 1893 when the Democrats regained control of the Senate and replaced him with former Confederate general William Ruffin Cox. McCook adopted an employee merit system and resisted senators' strong and persistent pressures for patronage appointments. He modernized office procedures and instituted a program for preserving the Senate's historical archives.

Mayor William L. Strong appointed McCook as city chamberlain of the city of New York and he served in that capacity from 1895 to 1898, as well as continuing to run his publishing company.

He died in New York City on December 30, 1917, and was buried in Union Cemetery-Beatty Park in his native Steubenville.

== See also ==
- List of American Civil War brevet generals (Union)

== Notes ==
U.S. House of Representatives
Preceded by Elijah Ward	Member of the U.S. House of Representatives from New York's 8th congressional district 1877-1883	Succeeded by John J. Adams
