= Lisbon Historic District =

Historic district in Ohio, United States

- U.S. National Register of Historic Places
- U.S. Historic district
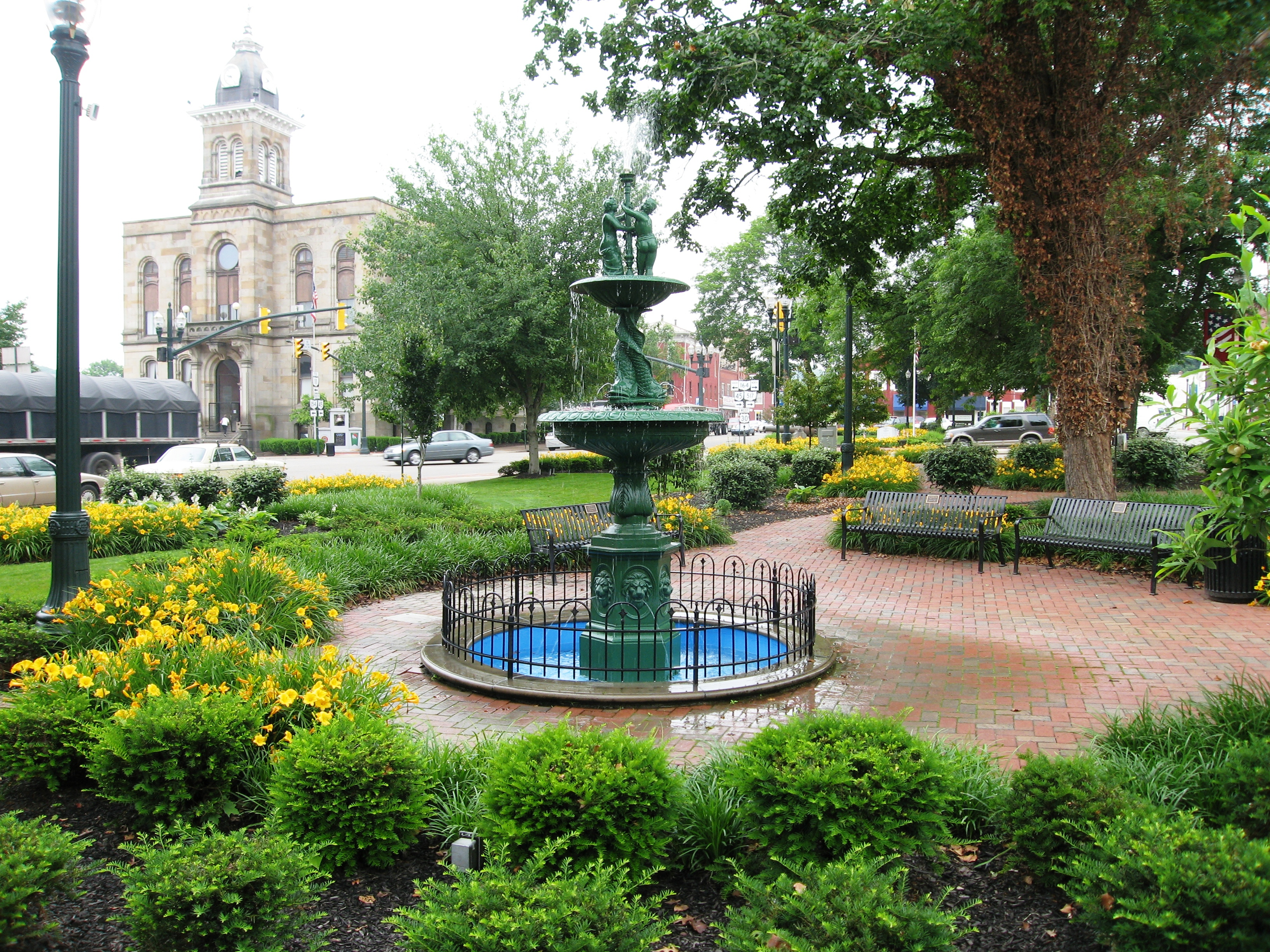
- Town square of Lisbon, Ohio and Columbiana County courthouse

- Location within Ohio Location within the United States
- Location: U.S. 30 and OH 45, Lisbon, Ohio
- Coordinates: 40°46′20″N 80°46′16″W
- Area: 42 acres (17 ha)
- Architect: Multiple
- Architectural style: Federal
- NRHP reference No.: 79001794
- Added to NRHP: August 24, 1979

The Lisbon Historic District is located at the intersection of U.S. Route 30 and Ohio route 45 in Lisbon, Ohio. The district covers approximately 42 acres (17 ha). The town of Lisbon was located along important land and water transportation routes from the east into newly settled territories in the west. As a result of this, Lisbon, the second oldest town in the state, played an important part in the development of Ohio, which had been granted statehood in 1803.

The district features a number of commercial and residential buildings which were constructed during the period from 1810–1900. The buildings, examples of predominantly Federal architecture, were mostly constructed of brick. The historic district encompasses the original town square (pictured).

The district was added to the National Register of Historic Places in August 1979.
