= Interstate 194 =

Interstate 194 is the designation for two Interstate Highways in the United States, both of which are related to Interstate 94:

- Interstate 194 (Michigan), a spur to Battle Creek
- Interstate 194 (North Dakota), an unsigned spur to Bismarck
