= 194 BC =

194 BC in various calendars
- Gregorian calendar: 194 BC; CXCIV BC
- Ab urbe condita: 560
- Ancient Egypt era: XXXIII dynasty, 130
- Pharaoh: Ptolemy V Epiphanes, 10
- Ancient Greek Olympiad (summer): 146th Olympiad, year 3
- Assyrian calendar: 4557
- Balinese saka calendar: N/A
- Bengali calendar: −787 – −786
- Berber calendar: 757
- Buddhist calendar: 351
- Burmese calendar: −831
- Byzantine calendar: 5315–5316
- Chinese calendar: 丙午年 (Fire Horse); 2504 or 2297 — to — 丁未年 (Fire Goat); 2505 or 2298
- Coptic calendar: −477 – −476
- Discordian calendar: 973
- Ethiopian calendar: −201 – −200
- Hebrew calendar: 3567–3568
- Hindu calendars
- Vikram Samvat: −137 – −136
- Shaka Samvat: N/A
- Kali Yuga: 2907–2908
- Holocene calendar: 9807
- Iranian calendar: 815 BP – 814 BP
- Islamic calendar: 840 BH – 839 BH
- Javanese calendar: N/A
- Julian calendar: N/A
- Korean calendar: 2140
- Minguo calendar: 2105 before ROC 民前2105年
- Nanakshahi calendar: −1661
- Seleucid era: 118/119 AG
- Thai solar calendar: 349–350
- Tibetan calendar: མེ་ཕོ་རྟ་ལོ་ (male Fire-Horse) −67 or −448 or −1220 — to — མེ་མོ་ལུག་ལོ་ (female Fire-Sheep) −66 or −447 or −1219

Year 194 BC was a year of the pre-Julian Roman calendar. At the time it was known as the Year of the Consulship of Africanus and Longus (or, less frequently, year 560 Ab urbe condita). The denomination 194 BC for this year has been used since the early medieval period, when the Anno Domini calendar era became the prevalent method in Europe for naming years.

== Events ==
=== By place ===
==== Greece ====
- After checking the ambitions of Nabis, the tyrant of Sparta, the Roman forces under proconsul Titus Quinctius Flamininus finally withdraw from Greece.
- With the Roman legions under Flaminius returning to Italy, the Greek states are once again on their own. The Romans leave the dominant powers in the region; the kingdom of Macedonia, the Aetolians, the strengthened Achaean League and the weakened Sparta. The Aetolians, who have opposed the Roman intervention in Greek affairs, incite the Spartan leader, Nabis, to retake his former territories and regain his influence in Greek affairs.

==== Seleucid Empire ====
- With his peace agreement with the Egyptians in place, Antiochus III now turns his attention to the West. He is encouraged to challenge Rome's protection of the Greeks by his advisor, the former Carthaginian general Hannibal.
- Philip V of Macedon, along with Rhodes, Pergamum, and the Achaean League, join Rome against Antiochus III.

==== Roman Republic ====
- The Battle of Mutina is fought between the Romans and the Boii (a Gallic tribe). The Romans are victorious in the battle which effectively ends the threat of the Gauls in Italy.
- The Italian towns of Liternum and Puteoli become Roman colonies.

==== China ====
- The construction of the first city wall of Chang'an begins.
- Empress Lü protects the accession of her son Emperor Hui by executing Consort Qi and her son to Gaozu, Liu Ruyi.

==== Korea ====
- The Wiman Joseon kingdom of northern Korea (Choson) is founded by the Chinese Han dynasty general Wiman.

== Deaths ==
- Eratosthenes, Greek mathematician, geographer and astronomer (b. 276 BC)
- Concubine Qi, also known as Lady Qi or Consort Qi, favoured concubine of Han Gaozu (personal name Liu Bang), the first emperor of the Chinese Han dynasty
