= AD 194 =

194 in various calendars
- Gregorian calendar: 194; CXCIV
- Ab urbe condita: 947
- Assyrian calendar: 4944
- Balinese saka calendar: 115–116
- Bengali calendar: −400 – −399
- Berber calendar: 1144
- Buddhist calendar: 738
- Burmese calendar: −444
- Byzantine calendar: 5702–5703
- Chinese calendar: 癸酉年 (Water Rooster); 2891 or 2684 — to — 甲戌年 (Wood Dog); 2892 or 2685
- Coptic calendar: −90 – −89
- Discordian calendar: 1360
- Ethiopian calendar: 186–187
- Hebrew calendar: 3954–3955
- Hindu calendars
- Vikram Samvat: 250–251
- Shaka Samvat: 115–116
- Kali Yuga: 3294–3295
- Holocene calendar: 10194
- Iranian calendar: 428 BP – 427 BP
- Islamic calendar: 441 BH – 440 BH
- Javanese calendar: 71–72
- Julian calendar: 194; CXCIV
- Korean calendar: 2527
- Minguo calendar: 1718 before ROC 民前1718年
- Nanakshahi calendar: −1274
- Seleucid era: 505/506 AG
- Thai solar calendar: 736–737
- Tibetan calendar: ཆུ་མོ་བྱ་ལོ་ (female Water-Bird); 320 or −61 or −833 — to — ཤིང་ཕོ་ཁྱི་ལོ་ (male Wood-Dog); 321 or −60 or −832

Year 194 (CXCIV) was a common year starting on Tuesday of the Julian calendar. At the time, it was known as the Year of the Consulship of Septimius and Septimius (or, less frequently, year 947 Ab urbe condita). The denomination 194 for this year has been used since the early medieval period, when the Anno Domini calendar era became the prevalent method in Europe for naming years.١٢٤

== Events ==
=== By place ===
==== Roman Empire ====
- Decimus Clodius Septimius Albinus Caesar becomes a Roman Consul.
- Battle of Issus: Septimius Severus marches with his army (12 legions) to Cilicia, and defeats Pescennius Niger, Roman governor of Syria. Pescennius retreats to Antioch, and is executed by Severus' troops.
- Septimius Severus besieges Byzantium (194–196); the city walls suffer extensive damage.

==== Asia ====
- Battle of Yan Province: Warlords Cao Cao and Lü Bu fight for control over Yan Province; the battle lasts for over 100 days.
- First year of the Xingping era, during the Han dynasty in China.

=== By topic ===
==== Art and Science ====
- Galen writes his manual on pathology, The Art of Curing (approximate date).

==== Religion ====
- Irenaeus declares Gnostic doctrines to be heretical (approximate date).

== Births ==
- Sun Huan (or Jiming), Chinese general (d. 234)
- Zhu Ju, Chinese official and general (d. 250)

== Deaths ==
- Liu Yan, Chinese warlord and governor
- Ma Midi, Chinese official and politician
- Pescennius Niger, Roman usurper (b. 140)
- Tao Qian, Chinese warlord and governor (b. 132)
