= 194th Brigade =

194th Brigade may refer to:

- 194th Motorized Infantry Brigade, People's Republic of China
- 194th Pontoon Bridge Brigade, Ukraine
- 194th (2/1st South Scottish) Brigade, United Kingdom
- 194th Armored Brigade, United States
- 194th Engineer Brigade, United States

== See also ==
- 194th Regiment (disambiguation)
