= 194th Battalion (Edmonton Highlanders), CEF =

194th Battalion, CEF
- Active: 1916–1917
- Country: Canada
- Branch: Canadian Expeditionary Force
- Type: Highland infantry
- Battle honours: The Great War, 1916–17

Commanders
- Officer commanding: LCol W. C. Craig

The 194th (Edmonton Highlanders) Battalion, CEF, was a unit in the Canadian Expeditionary Force during the First World War. Based in Edmonton, Alberta, the unit began recruiting during the winter of 1915/16 in that city and surrounding district. After sailing to England in November 1916, the battalion was absorbed into the 9th Reserve Battalion on January 21, 1917. The 194th (Edmonton Highlanders) Battalion, CEF, had one officer commanding: Lieutenant-Colonel W. C. Craig.

In 1929, the battalion was awarded the theatre of war honour The Great War, 1916–17.

The king's and regimental colours of the 194th Battalion are laid up in the rotunda of the Alberta Legislature Building in Edmonton.

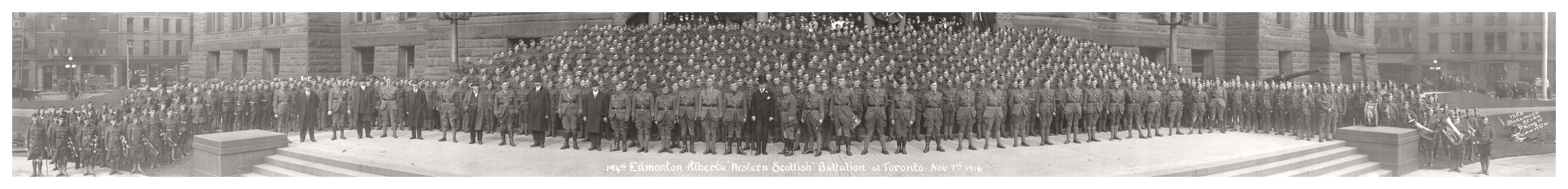
194th Edmonton Western Scottish Battalion in Toronto 1916
