= 194th Ohio Infantry Regiment =

- Active: March 1865 to October 24, 1865
- Country: United States
- Allegiance: Union
- Branch: Infantry

The 194th Ohio Infantry Regiment, sometimes 194th Ohio Volunteer Infantry (or 194th OVI) was an infantry regiment in the Union Army during the American Civil War.

== Service ==
The 194th Ohio Infantry was organized at Camp Chase in Columbus, Ohio, and mustered in for one year service under the command of Colonel Anson George McCook.

The regiment left Ohio for Charleston, West Virginia, March 14. It was assigned to General Egan's Provisional Division, Army of the Shenandoah. Participated in operations in the Shenandoah Valley until April, then ordered to Washington, D.C. for garrison duty until October.

The 194th Ohio Infantry mustered out of service October 24, 1865, at Washington, D.C.

== Casualties ==
The regiment lost a total of 38 enlisted men during service, all due to disease.

== Commanders ==
- Colonel Anson George McCook

== Notable members ==
- Colonel Anson George McCook - U.S. Senator from New York, 1877-1883

== See also ==
- List of Ohio Civil War units
- Ohio in the Civil War
