= Lisbon, Ohio =

- Village
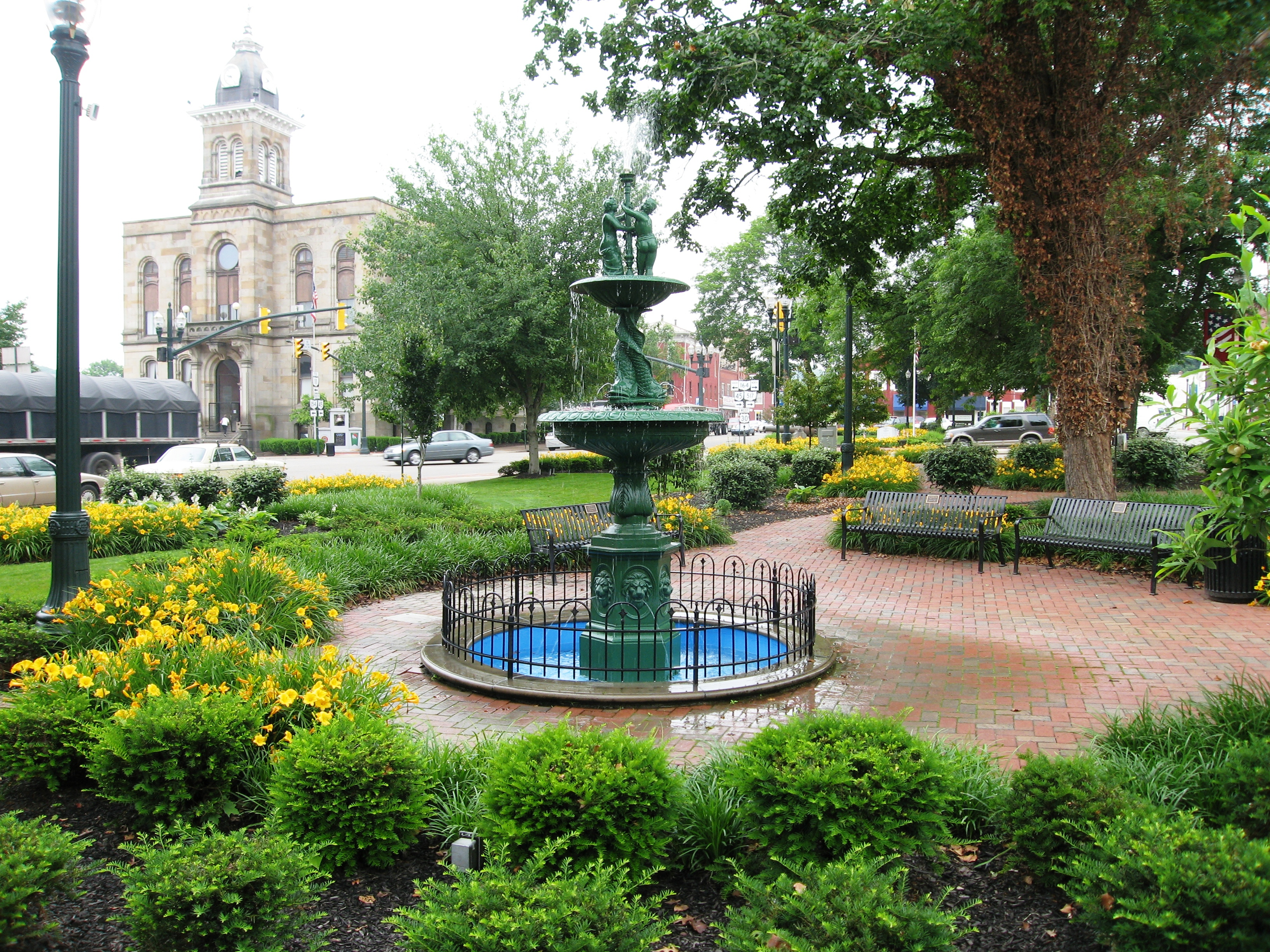
- Lisbon Historic District

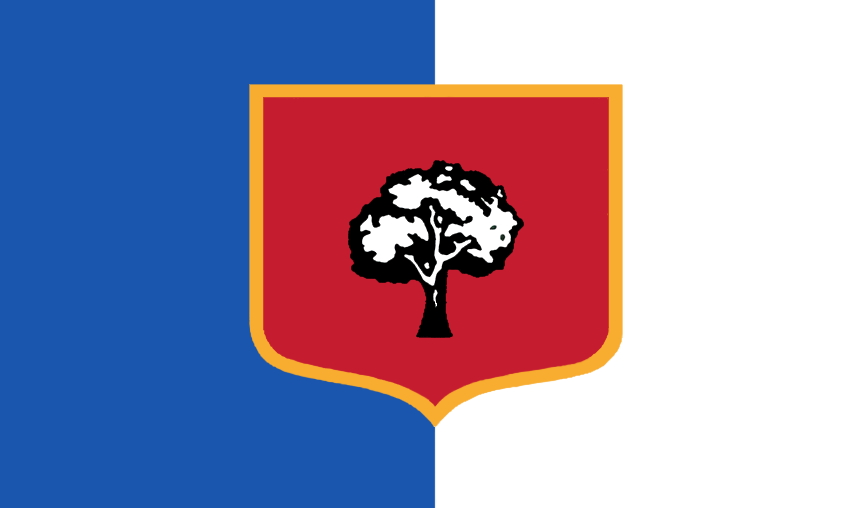
- Flag
- Interactive map of Lisbon, Ohio
- Location within Ohio Location within the United States
- Coordinates: 40°46′24″N 80°44′53″W
- Country: United States
- State: Ohio
- County: Columbiana
- Founded: February 16, 1803
- Named for: Lisbon, Portugal

Government
  - Type: Mayor-Council
  - Mayor: Peter Wilson (I)

Area
  - Total: 1.68 sq mi (4.36 km^{2})
  - Land: 1.68 sq mi (4.36 km^{2})
  - Water: 0 sq mi (0.00 km^{2})
- Elevation: 1,014 ft (309 m)

Population (2020)
  - Total: 2,597
  - Density: 1,542.2/sq mi (595.43/km^{2})
- Time zone: UTC-5 (EST)
  - Summer (DST): UTC-4 (EDT)
- ZIP code: 44432
- Area codes: 330, 234
- FIPS code: 39-44030
- GNIS feature ID: 2398448
- School District: Lisbon Exempted Village School District
- Website: https://www.lisbonvillage.org/

Lisbon is a village in Columbiana County, Ohio, United States, and its county seat. The population was 2,597 at the 2020 census. It was founded in 1803 and lies along Little Beaver Creek in the center of the county.

== History ==
The village was platted on February 16, 1803, by Baptist minister Lewis Kinney and originally named New Lisbon after Lisbon, Portugal. It was incorporated under a special act of legislature on February 7, 1825, and was renamed to Lisbon in 1895.

Initially known for its iron and whiskey production, Lisbon grew into a diverse economic hub during the Industrial Revolution and became one of the largest towns along the Sandy and Beaver Canal. During this period, it was home to the county's first bank, the Columbiana Bank of New Lisbon; its first insurance company, and Ohio's first newspaper, The Ohio Patriot, founded by Alsatian immigrant William D. Lepper and printed from 1809 to 1833.

In 1863, Confederate army general John Hunt Morgan surrendered to New Lisbon militia forces in nearby West Point at the end of Morgan's Raid. After the failure of the Sandy and Beaver Canal, the town had to wait until the late 1860s to receive railroad access once the Niles and New Lisbon Railroad opened. It and the later Pittsburgh, Marion & Chicago Railway helped bring industry to the area, including the porcelain manufacturing R. Thomas and Sons Company.

In 1899, Lisbon-area native Jacob L. Beilhart established the Spirit Fruit Society in the town, a small intentional community based on his rejection of jealousy, materialism, and fear of lost love. The group's mission was to "teach mankind how to apply the truths taught by Jesus Christ", emphasizing spiritual freedom and communal living. Although the group typically kept to themselves, their mysterious nature led to misconceptions and suspicion in the press. Despite attracting only about a dozen members, mostly from outside the region, the society's views on marriage and free love were poorly received locally, prompting their relocation to Chicago in late 1904.

In 1900, the modern drinking straw was invented and patented in Lisbon. The village adopted its flag in 1913, based on the flag of the Kingdom of Portugal. Lisbon became a qualified Tree City USA as recognized by the National Arbor Day Foundation in 1981.

== Geography ==
Lisbon is located at 40°46′26″N 80°46′3″W (40.773874, -80.767553). It is located 25 miles (40 km) southwest of Youngstown. According to the United States Census Bureau, the village has a total area of 1.69 square miles (4.38 km^{2}), all land.

== Demographics ==
Historical population
| Census | Pop. | Note | %± |
|---|---|---|---|
| 1810 | 303 | | — |
| 1820 | 746 | | 146.2% |
| 1830 | 1,129 | | 51.3% |
| 1860 | 1,381 | | — |
| 1870 | 1,569 | | 13.6% |
| 1880 | 2,028 | | 29.3% |
| 1890 | 2,278 | | 12.3% |
| 1900 | 3,330 | | 46.2% |
| 1910 | 3,084 | | −7.4% |
| 1920 | 3,113 | | 0.9% |
| 1930 | 3,405 | | 9.4% |
| 1940 | 3,379 | | −0.8% |
| 1950 | 3,293 | | −2.5% |
| 1960 | 3,579 | | 8.7% |
| 1970 | 3,521 | | −1.6% |
| 1980 | 3,159 | | −10.3% |
| 1990 | 3,037 | | −3.9% |
| 2000 | 2,788 | | −8.2% |
| 2010 | 2,821 | | 1.2% |
| 2020 | 2,597 | | −7.9% |

=== 2010 census ===
As of the census of 2010, there were 2,821 people, 1,138 households, and 693 families residing in the village. The population density was 1,669.2 inhabitants per square mile (644.5/km^{2}). There were 1,287 housing units at an average density of 761.5 per square mile (294.0/km^{2}). The racial makeup of the village was 97.4% White, 1.1% African American, 0.2% Native American, 0.2% Asian, 0.2% from other races, and 0.9% from two or more races. Hispanic or Latino of any race were 1.2% of the population.

There were 1,138 households, of which 30.1% had children under the age of 18 living with them, 42.4% were married couples living together, 13.0% had a female householder with no husband present, 5.5% had a male householder with no wife present, and 39.1% were non-families. 34.2% of all households were made up of individuals, and 13.4% had someone living alone who was 65 years of age or older. The average household size was 2.35 and the average family size was 3.00.

The median age in the village was 39.6 years. 23.1% of residents were under the age of 18; 9% were between the ages of 18 and 24; 24.3% were from 25 to 44; 28.1% were from 45 to 64; and 15.5% were 65 years of age or older. The gender makeup of the village was 47.3% male and 52.7% female.

=== 2000 census ===
As of the census of 2000, there were 2,788 people, 1,133 households, and 696 families residing in the village. The population density was 2,521.1 inhabitants per square mile (973.4/km^{2}). There were 1,253 housing units at an average density of 1,133.0 per square mile (437.5/km^{2}). The racial makeup of the village was 97.74% White, 0.90% African American, 0.22% Native American, 0.22% Asian, 0.04% Pacific Islander, 0.29% from other races, and 0.61% from two or more races. Hispanic or Latino of any race were 0.61% of the population.

There were 1,133 households, out of which 30.1% had children under the age of 18 living with them, 46.5% were married couples living together, 11.9% had a female householder with no husband present, and 38.5% were non-families. 34.3% of all households were made up of individuals, and 16.8% had someone living alone who was 65 years of age or older. The average household size was 2.37 and the average family size was 3.07.

In the village, the population was spread out, with 24.9% under the age of 18, 8.8% from 18 to 24, 27.8% from 25 to 44, 22.6% from 45 to 64, and 15.9% who were 65 years of age or older. The median age was 38 years. For every 100 females, there were 89.7 males. For every 100 females age 18 and over, there were 87.0 males.

The median income for a household in the village was $27,841, and the median income for a family was $36,707. Males had a median income of $29,271 versus $19,826 for females. The per capita income for the village was $14,097. About 10.1% of families and 14.1% of the population were below the poverty line, including 13.4% of those under the age of 18 and 5.2% of those 65 years or over.

== Arts and culture ==
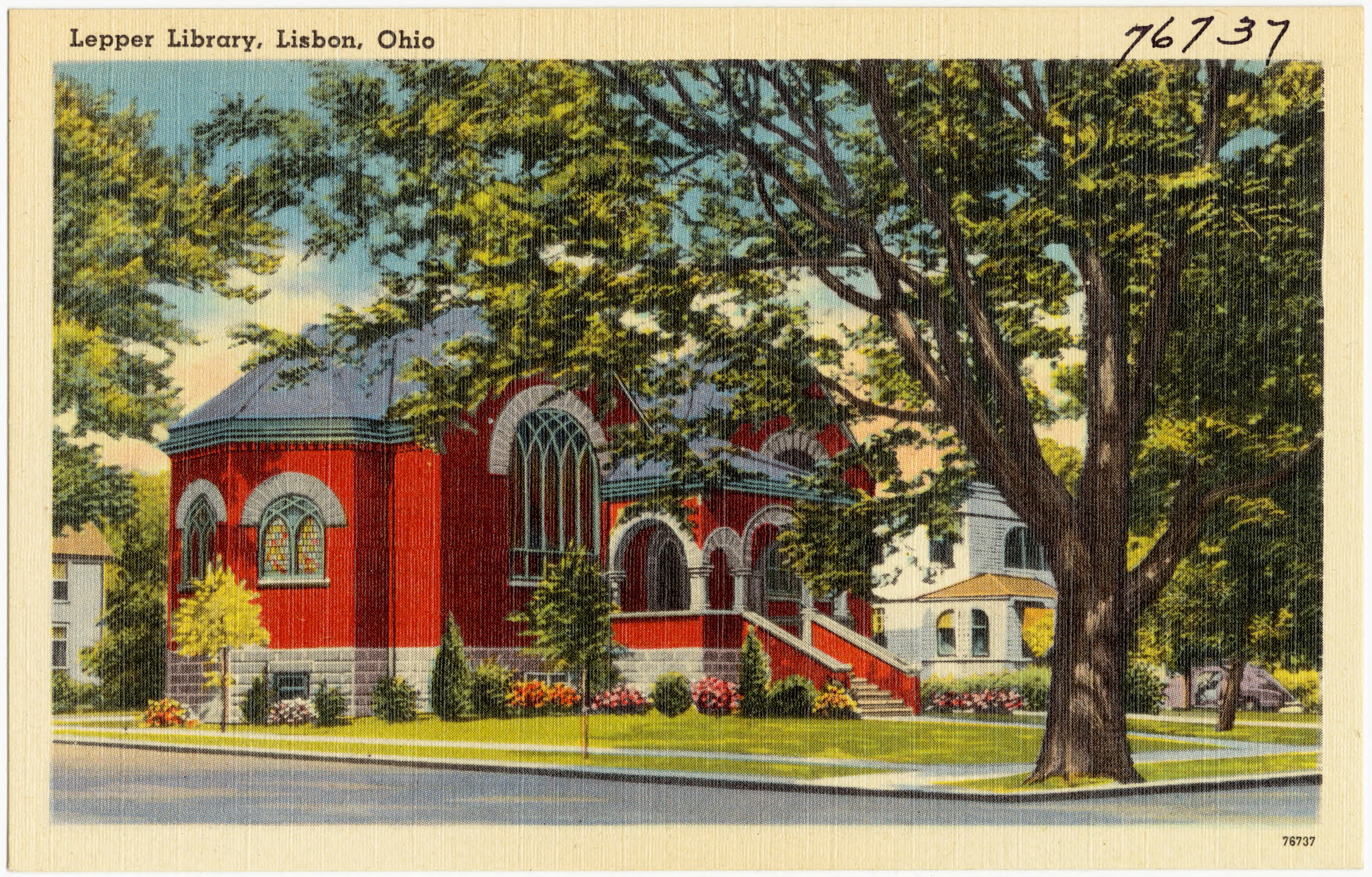
Lepper Library postcard c. 1930-1945

Lisbon hosts the annual Columbiana County Fair, established in 1845, each summer, and the Lisbon Johnny Appleseed Festival, established in 1967, each autumn. The pioneer is said to have planted an apple tree nursery in the area in the 1800s. The Dulci-More Festival was a music festival dedicated to the Appalachian dulcimer and other traditional musical instruments that took place over Memorial Day weekend at Camp McKinley Boy Scouts camp from 1995 to 2019. The instrumental song "Lisbon, OH" by indie folk band Bon Iver is named after the village.

The Little Beaver Creek Greenway Trail originates in the village and follows the former Pittsburgh, Lisbon & Western Railroad line to Washingtonville. It is the southern end of the Great Ohio Lake to River Greenway. Lisbon was recognized as a Trail Town of the North Country Trail Association in 2022.

The village is home to the public Lepper Library, founded in 1897. The building site on Lincoln Way and a $10,000 grant were donated by Virginia Lepper in memory of her late husband.

== Government ==
Lisbon operates under a mayor–council government, where there are six council members elected as a legislature in addition to an independently elected mayor who serves as an executive. As of 2025, the mayor of Lisbon is Peter Wilson (I). Additionally, Lisbon has a Board of Trustees of Public Affairs, a three-member board elected separately from the village council.

== Education ==
Children in Lisbon are served by the public Lisbon Exempted Village School District, which includes one elementary school and David Anderson Junior/Senior High School. The Columbiana County Career and Technical Center is immediately south of village corporation limits.

== Media ==
Lisbon is home to the Morning Journal, a local newspaper serving Columbiana County. The result of multiple mergers, it began printing in 1909.

== Transportation ==
U.S. Route 30 travels through Lisbon on an east–west route. It enters the village from Hanoverton over Little Beaver Creek and is signed as Lincoln Way. In downtown, U.S. 30 has a traffic signal at State Route 45/State Route 154/State Route 164. This intersection is the southern terminus for State Route 517, which travels east–west to East Fairfield, and the western terminus for SR 154. SR 45 travels north to Salem and SR 164 traverses north–south to Columbiana and Salineville.

SR 45/SR 154 continues east concurrent with U.S. 30 through downtown Lisbon. The concurrency with SR 154 ends when U.S. 30 and SR 45 turn southeasterly toward West Point and SR 154 continues east toward Elkton and State Route 11.

== Notable residents ==
- William W. Armstrong, journalist and 15th Ohio secretary of state
- George M. Ashford, surveyor and Alaska pioneer
- Reasin Beall, U.S. representative from Ohio's 6th district
- Jacob L. Beilhart, communitarian leader
- Lucretia Blankenburg, suffragist and writer
- Fisher A. Blocksom, member of the Ohio General Assembly
- William T. H. Brooks, U.S. Army major general during the Civil War
- John C. Chaney, U.S. representative from Indiana's 2nd district
- John Hessin Clarke, associate justice of the U.S. Supreme Court
- Charles D. Coffin, U.S. representative from Ohio's 17th district
- Larry Csonka, former National Football League fullback
- Katy Easterday, collegiate football and basketball player
- George A. Garretson, U.S. Army brigadier general
- John M. Gilman, politician in the Ohio and Minnesota House of Representatives
- Howard Melville Hanna, businessman
- Mark Hanna, U.S. senator from Ohio and chairman of the Republican National Committee
- Jacob Hostetter, U.S. representative from Pennsylvania's 4th district
- Sean D. Logan, member of the Ohio House of Representatives
- Andrew W. Loomis, U.S. representative from Ohio's 17th district
- Fighting McCooks, famed officers in the Union Army during the Civil War
  - Daniel McCook, attorney and Union Army major
  - George Wythe McCook, fourth Ohio attorney general and Union Army colonel
  - Henry Christopher McCook, clergyman, author, and Union Army chaplain
  - John James McCook, lawyer, professor, and Union Army chaplain
  - Robert Latimer McCook, Union Army brigadier general
  - Roderick S. McCook, U.S. Navy officer
- Betty McKenna, professional third basewoman
- William McKinley Sr., pioneer of the iron industry in east Ohio and father of U.S. president William McKinley
- Thayer Melvin, fourth West Virginia attorney general
- James D. Moffat, third president of Washington & Jefferson College
- William Duane Morgan, newspaper editor and politician
- Stephen Paxson, missionary who started over 1,300 Sunday schools in the American frontier
- Zach Paxson, singer-songwriter
- Elderkin Potter, member of the Ohio House of Representatives
- Nicholas Talbott, military officer and transgender rights activist
- Robert Walker Tayler, U.S. representative from Ohio's 18th district
- John Thomson, U.S. representative from Ohio's 6th, 12th, and 17th districts
- Clement Vallandigham, U.S. representative from Ohio's 3rd district
- Jonathan H. Wallace, U.S. representative from Ohio's 18th district
