= Clifton Park =

Clifton Park may refer to:

- Clifton Park, Baltimore, a public urban park and national historic district in Baltimore, Maryland.
- Clifton Park, New York, a suburban town in Saratoga County, New York
- Clifton Park and Museum, a park and museum in Clifton Park, Rotherham, South Yorkshire
- Clifton Park (Lakewood, Ohio), a neighborhood located in Lakewood, Ohio, a Cuyahoga County suburb
