= Coal miners' strike of 1873 =

Union strike in the United States

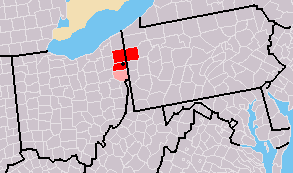
- Mahoning, Shenango, and Tuscarawas Valleys in the Youngstown area of Ohio and Pennsylvania
- Date: 1873
- Location: Mahoning Valley, Shenango Valley, Tuscarawas Valley
- Goals: wages
- Methods: Strikes, Protest, Demonstrations

Parties
Miners' Union (local)	Local coal companies

Number
7,500 strikers	strikebreakers

Casualties and losses
	Deaths: 1

The Coal miners' strike of 1873, was a strike against wage cuts in the Mahoning, Shenango, and Tuscarawas Valleys of northeastern Ohio and northwestern Pennsylvania. In the Tuscarawas Valley, the labor action lasted six months, and in the Mahoning Valley four and a half months, but the walkouts failed. The introduction of imported strikebreakers and manufacturers finding substitutes for the area's special block-coal, forced the organized miners back to work at prevailing wages.

== Strike ==
As of 1872, bituminous coal miners in this location received $1.10 (~$30.00 in 2025) per ton of coal mined. Later that year, they demanded a $0.15 per ton increase. The mine operators responded with a demand for a decrease of $0.20 per ton. By January 1, 1873, over 6,000 unionized coal miners had walked out over the proposed 25% wage cut. The local and national press followed the events of the miners' walkout. They covered several violent confrontations between striking miners and replacement workers.

The events around this local miners' action proved to be precedent setting in several ways. Mine owners employed the practice of importing replacement workers (strikebreakers) from far afield, from the Port of New York and other Eastern seaports, and from Virginia. As of February 6, with 7,500 strikers out, owners had imported the first 300 black replacements from Virginia, "and the experiment succeeds so well that other proprietors will probably follow suit."

The Unification of Italy produced a new country, the Kingdom of Italy. The fledging government's policies of raising taxes and converting communal and church lands into real estate hit the peasant population particularly hard. To add to the troubles, a bandits’ war against the Kingdom threw the Southern countryside into chaos. The result caused thousands of Italians to leave for Northern Europe and the Americas. Previous Italian immigration to the U.S. had been negligible, but by 1870, immigrants arriving on the East Coast reached the thousands for the first time. Unlike subsequent generations of Italian immigrants, these first arrivals had no contacts or job offers in the United States. The penniless immigrants ended up at government expense in a large shelter on Ward's Island, on the grounds of an insane asylum. Shipload after shipload of economic refugees from Italy continued to arrive, overcrowding the holding facility. When the coal operators from the Mahoning Valley sent recruiters to tap this idle labor force, 200 Italians responded to their call between March and May 1873. One group arrived in Coalburg, Hubbard Township, and the second, a few months later, in Church Hill, Liberty Township. Newspaper accounts record that the replacement miners were sent by rail to work mines in Coalburg, Hubbard Township and Church Hill, Liberty Township, Ohio.

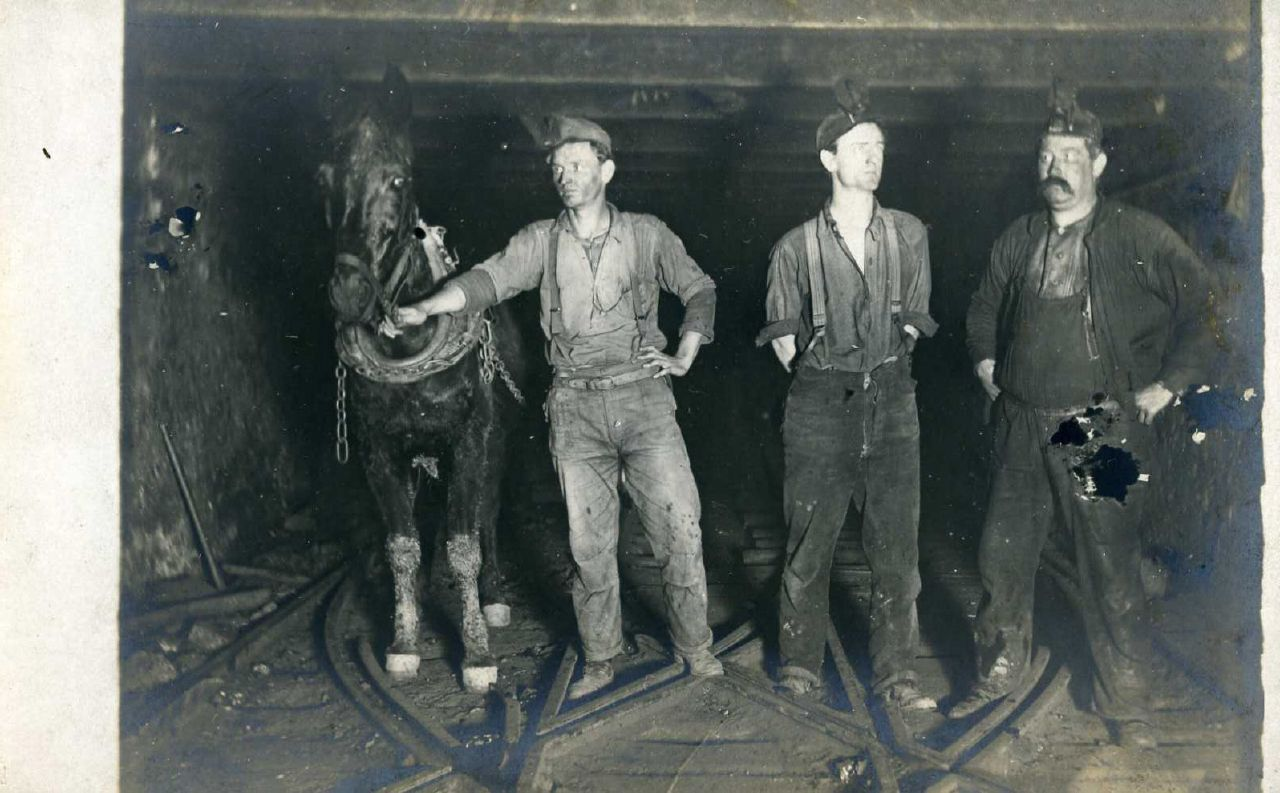
Miners using mule to move coal.

At the outset of their rail journey, neither the Italians nor the Virginia men knew their employment was contingent upon being replacement workers. Throughout the strike and even afterwards, considerable violence and destruction resulted from clashes between strikers and strikebreakers. Strikers engaged in physical attacks against replacement miners and miners who returned to work in Coalburg and in several nearby townships. Local papers recorded arson and one strike-related homicide, that of Giovanni Chiesa, a.k.a. John Church, both in Churchill.

== Aftermath ==
The appearance of the Italian strikebreakers marks one of the earliest recorded arrivals of Southern Italians in the Mahoning Valley. After the conclusion of the strike, many settled in Coalburg's Little Italy. The actions of the coal mine operators may have also added to the number of African Americans settling in the Mahoning Valley. The tactic of exploiting immigrants and blacks as strikebreakers continued for several decades. This undermined coal miners' efforts to organize. The strike marks post-Civil War changes in the relationship between capital and labor. Importation of replacements from afar to control the workplace now became possible via new technology, the telegraph and railroads.

Although the miners' strike began nine months before the Panic of 1873, railroad construction had begun falling the year before as a result of Civil War over expansion. This had a deflationary effect on coal prices as the demand for iron and steel decreased. Strikes by the same coal workers continued at least through March 1876 in the Tuscarawas Valley, when a strike at the Warmington Mine south of Canton escalated into violence that required the insertion of state troops by Governor Rutherford B. Hayes to restore order. Young attorney William McKinley represented the unpopular miners without a fee, by highlighting the dangers of the industry – 250 fatalities in the state every year, and another 700 injuries – and the practices of local mine owners. One of those owners was Mark Hanna. Although opponents in the case, the two formed a political alliance that saw McKinley elected U.S. president in 1896.

== See also ==
- Coal Wars
