= Mark Hanna =

American businessman and politician (1837–1904)

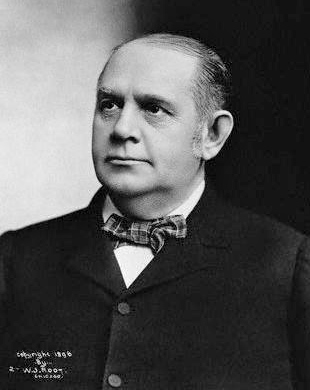
- Portrait, 1896

United States Senator from Ohio
- In office March 5, 1897 – February 15, 1904
- Preceded by: John Sherman
- Succeeded by: Charles W. F. Dick

Chair of the Republican National Committee
- In office June 18, 1896 – February 15, 1904
- Preceded by: Thomas H. Carter
- Succeeded by: Henry Payne (Acting)

Personal details
- Born: Marcus Alonzo Hanna; September 24, 1837 New Lisbon, Ohio, U.S. (now Lisbon)
- Died: February 15, 1904 (aged 66) Washington, D.C., U.S.
- Resting place: Lake View Cemetery
- Party: Republican
- Spouse: Charlotte Rhodes (m. 1864)
- Children: 3, including Ruth
- Education: Case Western Reserve University

Military service
- Allegiance: United States (Union)
- Branch/service: United States Army (Union Army)
- Unit: Perry Light Infantry
- Battles/wars: American Civil War

Marcus Alonzo Hanna (September 24, 1837 – February 15, 1904) was an American businessman and Republican politician who served as a United States Senator from Ohio as well as chairman of the Republican National Committee. A friend and political ally of President William McKinley, Hanna used his wealth and business skills to successfully manage McKinley's presidential campaigns in 1896 and in 1900.

Hanna was born in New Lisbon (today Lisbon), Ohio, in 1837. His family moved to the growing city of Cleveland in his teenage years, where he attended high school with John D. Rockefeller, who became a lifelong friend. He was expelled from college, and entered the family mercantile business. He served briefly during the American Civil War and married Charlotte Rhodes. Her father, Daniel Rhodes, took Hanna into his business after the war. Hanna was soon a partner in the firm, which grew to have interests in many areas, especially coal and iron. He was a millionaire by his 40th birthday, and turned his attention to politics.

Despite Hanna's efforts on his behalf, Ohio Senator John Sherman failed to gain the Republican nomination for president in 1884 and 1888. With Sherman becoming too old to be considered a contender, Hanna worked to elect William McKinley. In 1895, Hanna left his business career to devote himself full-time to McKinley's campaign for president. Hanna paid all expenses to get McKinley the nomination the following year, although he was in any event the frontrunner. The Democrats nominated former Nebraska Congressman William Jennings Bryan, who ran on a bimetallism, or "Free Silver", platform. Hanna's fundraising broke records, and once initial public enthusiasm for Bryan and his program subsided, McKinley was elected comfortably.

Declining a Cabinet position, Hanna secured appointment as senator from Ohio after Sherman was made Secretary of State; he was re-elected by the Ohio General Assembly in 1898 and 1904. After McKinley's assassination in 1901, Hanna worked for the building of a canal in Panama, rather than elsewhere in Central America, as had previously been proposed. He died in 1904, and is remembered for his role in McKinley's election, thanks to savage cartoons by such illustrators as Homer Davenport, who lampooned him as McKinley's political master.

== Early life and business career ==
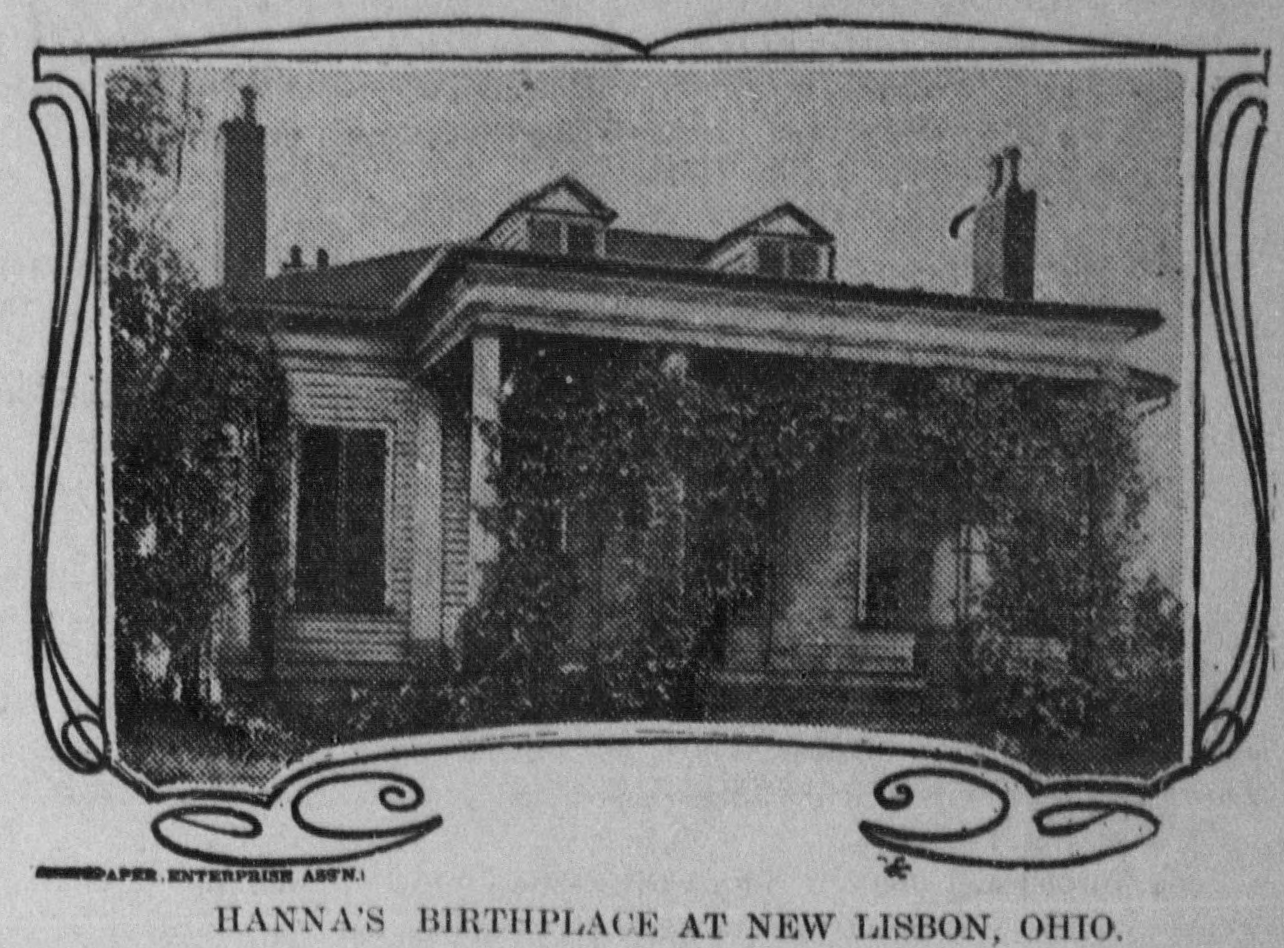
Hanna's birthplace

Marcus Alonzo Hanna was born on September 24, 1837, in New Lisbon (in 1895 renamed Lisbon), Ohio, to Dr. Leonard and Samantha Hanna. Leonard's father, Benjamin Hanna, a Quaker of Scotch-Irish descent, was a wealthy store owner in New Lisbon. Dr. Hanna practiced in Columbiana County, where New Lisbon was located, until he suffered a spinal injury while riding. After the accident, he joined the family business, B., L., and T. Hanna, by then a major grocery and goods brokering firm. Samantha, née Converse, and her parents had journeyed west from Vermont when she was 11; she was of English, possibly Irish, and French Huguenot descent.

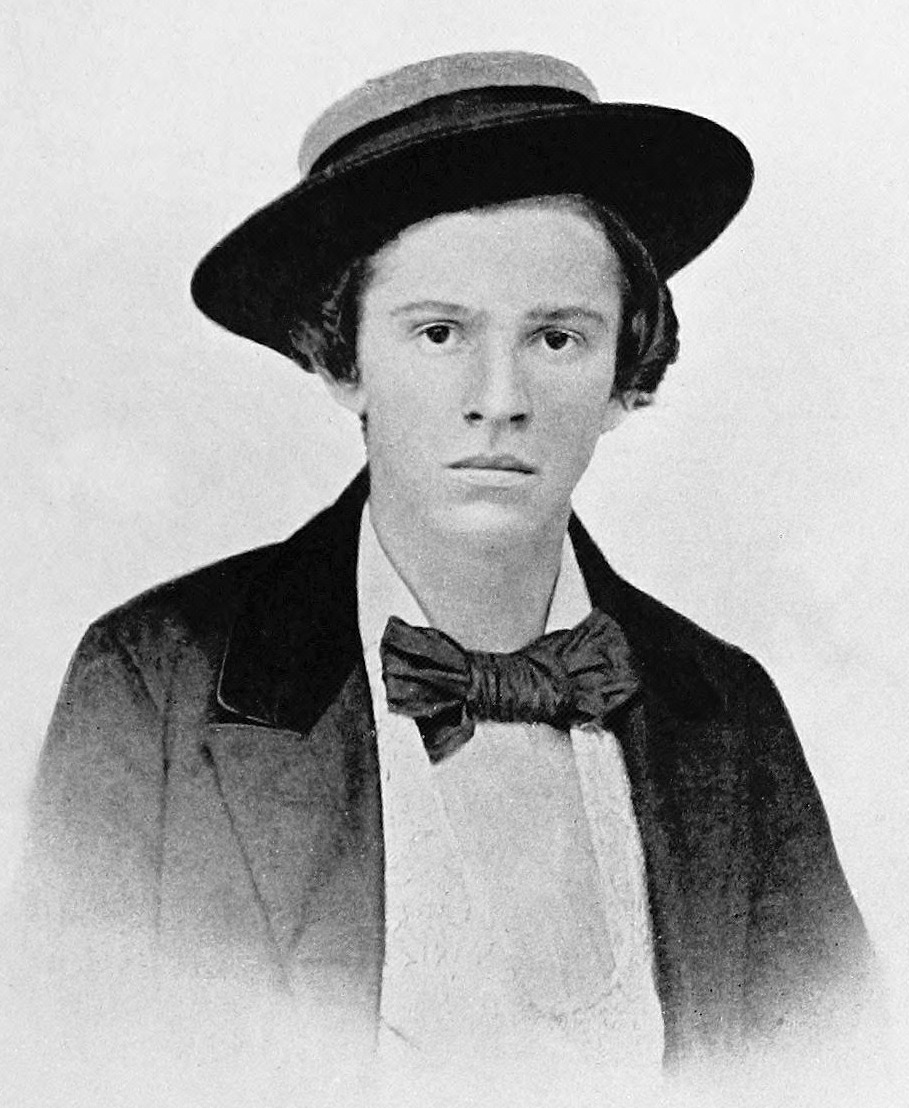
Hanna in his early years, c. 1848

Mark's uncle Kersey Hanna described Mark as a boy as "short, strong and rugged, with a full round figure". Young Mark attended the local public school, which conducted class in the basement of the Presbyterian church. He competed in the local boys' debating society, and on the question of whether the black man had more cause for complaint than the Indian, carried the day arguing for the blacks.

Members of the Hanna family invested in a canal project to connect New Lisbon, distant from waterways, to the Ohio River. The canal was a failure, and the family lost large sums of money. Most Hanna family members left New Lisbon in the early 1850s. Dr. Hanna went into partnership with his brother Robert, starting a grocery business in Cleveland, and relocated his family there in 1852. In Cleveland, Mark attended several public schools, including Cleveland Central High School, which he went to at the same time as John D. Rockefeller and was one of his classmates. After graduation in 1857, Hanna attended Western Reserve College, but was dismissed for distributing mock programs at a solemn ceremonial. Hanna served in various capacities in the family business, learning it from the bottom up.

== Civil War service ==
By the start of the Civil War, he was a major participant in the business. Dr. Hanna had fallen ill with complications from his spinal injury (he died on December 15, 1862), and Mark Hanna, even before his father's death, was made a partner.

With an ill father and many business responsibilities, Mark Hanna could not be spared by his family to join the Union Army, hiring a substitute to enlist in his place. Instead, he became a member of the Perry Light Infantry, a regiment of National Guard troops consisting mostly of young Cleveland businessmen. In 1864, his regiment was briefly mustered into active service as the 150th Ohio Infantry and sent to be garrison troops at Fort Stevens, part of Washington, D.C.'s defenses. During the time the Perry Light Infantry was in service, it saw brief combat action as Confederate General Jubal Early feigned an attack on Washington. However, Hanna, who had been commissioned a second lieutenant, was absent during that time, having been sent to escort the body of a deceased soldier back to Ohio. The regiment was mustered out in August 1864.

== Post war ==
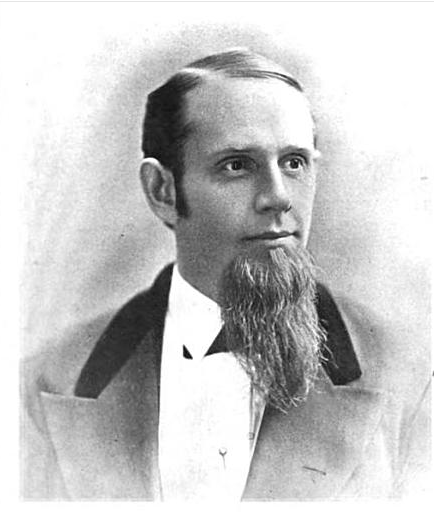
Mark Hanna, c. 1877

Even before his service during the Civil War, Hanna had fallen in love with Charlotte Augusta Rhodes, whom he met in 1862, shortly after her return from a finishing school. Her father Daniel Rhodes was an ardent Democrat and was distantly related to Illinois Senator Stephen A. Douglas, the unsuccessful Democratic candidate for president in 1860. Rhodes disliked the fact that Hanna had supported the successful Republican candidate, former Illinois Congressman Abraham Lincoln. Daniel Rhodes eventually yielded, and Mark and Charlotte Augusta Hanna were married on September 27, 1864.

The 1850s and 1860s were a time of great expansion for Cleveland, which grew from a small lakeside town to a major player in Great Lakes commerce and a rival to the southern Ohio city of Cincinnati. With peace restored in 1865, Hanna struck out on his own ventures. Foreseeing a demand for petroleum products, he built a refinery, and also invested his own money in the Lac La Belle, a swift Great Lakes steamer. The ship sank and the refinery burned, uninsured. The losses reduced Hanna to near-insolvency. According to Hanna biographer Herbert Croly, "he had gained little from the first nine years of his business life except experience." His father-in-law, appreciating Hanna's potential, took him into his own business in 1867 as a partner and soon retired. The firm, Rhodes and Company (later M.A. Hanna and Company), dealt principally in coal and steel, but under Hanna expanded into many fields. The firm had close dealings with the railroads—especially the Pennsylvania Railroad, which carried much of its freight. Hanna later became director of two railroads, including one of the Pennsylvania's leased lines.

In the 1868 presidential election, Hanna supported the Republican, former Union General Ulysses S. Grant. The flood of inflationary greenback currency issued during the war made Rhodes and Company's dealings in the new confederation of Canada difficult; merchants would accept a dollar in paper money as the equivalent of 35 cents in gold. Hanna hoped that Grant, who was elected, would institute policies which would return full value to the currency. The firm built many vessels and also gained interests in a wide variety of firms, which in turn used the Rhodes steamers. Hanna also purchased Cleveland's opera house, allowing it to remain open at times when it could not pay its full rent.

During Grant's first four-year term, Hanna began to involve himself in politics. At first, his interest was purely local, supporting Republican candidates for municipal and Cuyahoga County offices. In 1869, he was elected to the Cleveland Board of Education, but as he was traveling a good deal for business at the time, was able to attend less than half the meetings. In 1873, disgusted by local scandals and the influence of party bosses, he and other Republicans briefly abandoned the party to elect a Democrat running for mayor of Cleveland on a reform agenda.

== Aspiring kingmaker (1880–1888) ==
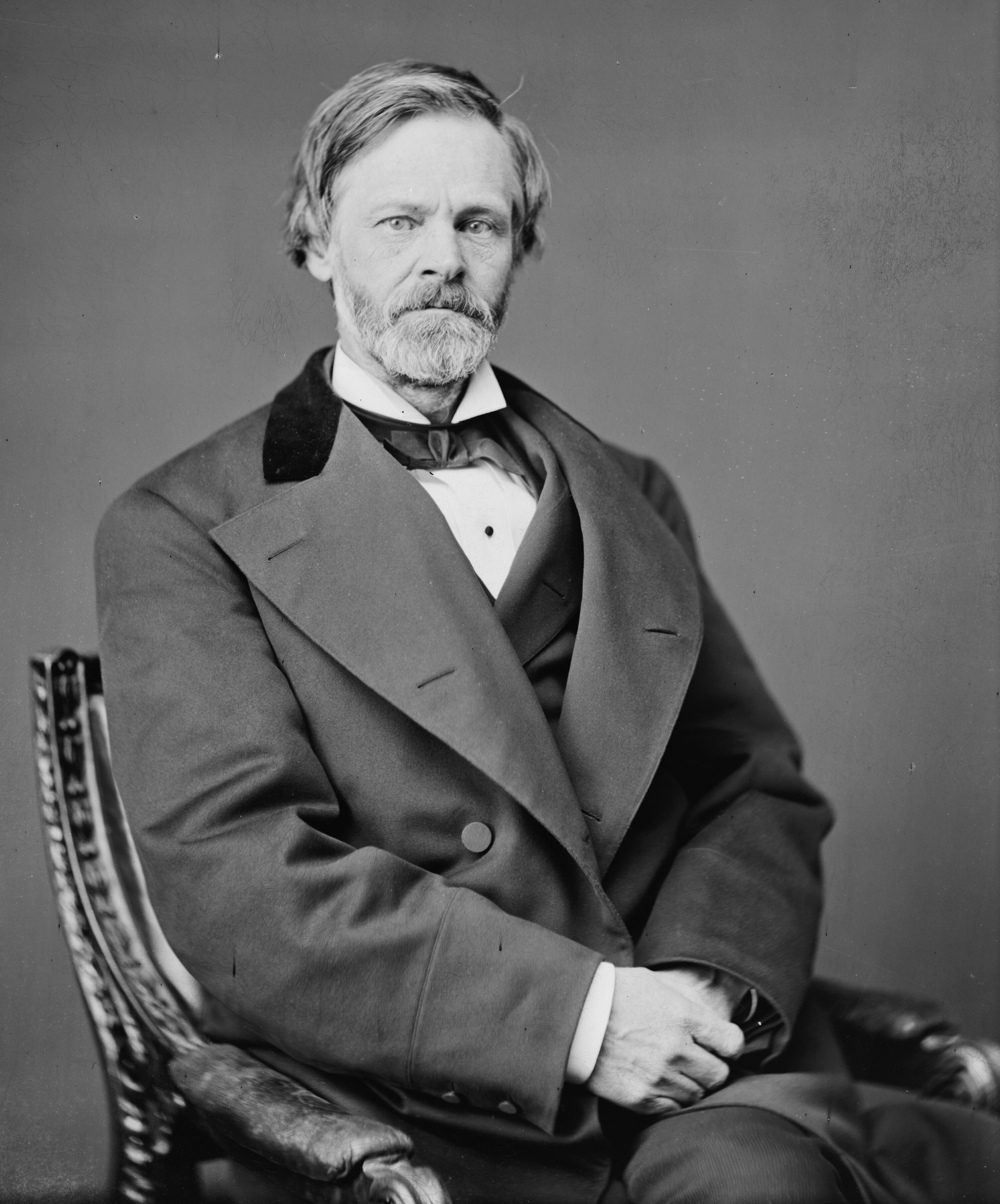
Before McKinley, Hanna tried to make John Sherman president.

In 1880, Hanna added The Cleveland Herald newspaper to his business empire. This was resented by Edwin Cowles, who owned the Republican newspaper in Cleveland, The Cleveland Leader. For the next five years, until Hanna sold the newspaper, he was bitterly attacked by Cowles in his paper. According to Hanna biographer William T. Horner, the episode was the start of the negative image of Hanna in the press which would be further developed by the Hearst newspapers over a decade later. Cowles's paper attacked Hanna personally, dubbing him "Marcus Aurelius". Cowles's choice of nickname was dictated by the coincidence of name, without regard to that emperor's good reputation. The nickname remained with Hanna throughout the remainder of his career.

The incumbent in 1880, President Rutherford Hayes, had no interest in seeking a second term; after 36 ballots, the Republicans nominated Ohio Representative James Garfield. The nominee had gone to the convention as manager of the campaign of his fellow Ohioan, Secretary of the Treasury John Sherman. Garfield had emerged as a candidate after delegates were impressed by his nomination speech of Sherman. Although Hanna did not attend the convention, he was very active in the fall campaign. The industrialist helped found a businessman's fundraising club to raise money for Garfield's personal expenses in the campaign. Garfield, who ran a front porch campaign, often had to entertain politicians and others who came to meet him at his home in Mentor. According to Charles Dick, who succeeded Hanna in the Senate after the latter's death in 1904, "Mr. Hanna had as much to do with the election of Mr. Garfield as any single individual in the country."

Hanna, according to his biographer Croly, was in charge of the arrangements for the campaign visit of former President Grant and New York Senator Roscoe Conkling to the state. Croly credits him with persuading the two men, who were Stalwarts hostile to Garfield's Half-Breed wing of the party, to visit Garfield in Mentor. Having Grant go to Mentor would be an important show of party unity—Grant had sought the presidency again in 1880, but his faction had failed to gain the nomination for him. However, later biographer Horner believes the tale dubious, suggesting that Grant made the decision unaided by Hanna. Garfield favored civil service reform, a position disliked by Hanna, who felt that public jobs should be used to reward campaign workers. Nevertheless, he strongly supported Garfield as a fellow Ohioan, and the Republican candidate defeated his fellow Civil War general Winfield Hancock by a narrow margin in the November election. Hanna did much fundraising work, roaming the state to persuade business owners to contribute to the Garfield campaign.

Hanna sought no position in the Garfield administration, although Horner states that his services to the campaign entitled him to a reward, and speculates that Hanna did not make any request of Garfield because of their political differences. Garfield's short-lived administration ended with his assassination after six months in office. Hanna was in charge of the committee which took charge of the late president's body when it was brought to Cleveland and saw to the funeral arrangements and interment at Lake View Cemetery—where Hanna himself was to be laid to rest over 20 years later.

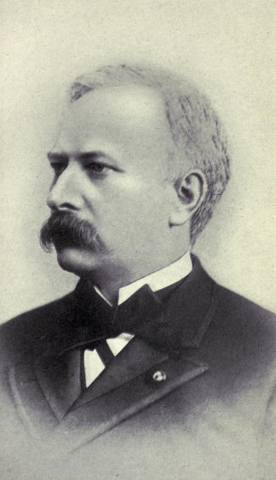
Joseph B. Foraker

In 1884, Hanna sought election as a delegate to the Republican National Convention in support of the presidential bid of Senator Sherman (as he was by then)—President Chester A. Arthur, Garfield's successor, was seeking re-nomination, but was opposed by a number of other Republicans. Hanna supported Sherman as the candidate favored the gold standard and worked to solve the problems of business, and because he was from Ohio. The industrialist was successfully opposed by Cowles at the local convention but was elected a delegate-at-large from Ohio at the state convention. At the national convention, Hanna joined forces in support of Sherman with another delegate-at-large from Ohio, former Cincinnati judge Joseph B. Foraker, whose rise in state and national politics over the next 20 years would parallel Hanna's. The Ohio delegation proved bitterly divided between supporters of Sherman and those supporting Maine Senator James G. Blaine. Foraker gained national acclaim with his speech nominating Sherman, and Hanna worked for the senator's nomination, but Blaine won easily. With a non-Ohioan, the nominee, Hanna worked less energetically for the Republicans than he had in 1880. Blaine lost to the Democratic candidate, New York Governor Grover Cleveland.

During the first Cleveland administration, Hanna continued to run his businesses and prepared for another run by Sherman, whom he did not actually meet until 1885. Once he did, however, a warm relationship grew between the two men. President Cleveland selected Hanna as one of the Union Pacific Railroad's directors—part of the corporate board was then appointed by the government. The appointment was most likely at the recommendation of Senator Sherman. The industrialist's work for the railroad was highly praised by its president, Charles Francis Adams; Hanna's knowledge of the coal business led to him being appointed head of one of the board's committees with responsibility in that area. Hanna was a major campaign adviser and fundraiser for Foraker's successful runs for governor in 1885 and 1887.

== McKinley partisan (1888–1896) ==
=== Early relationship ===
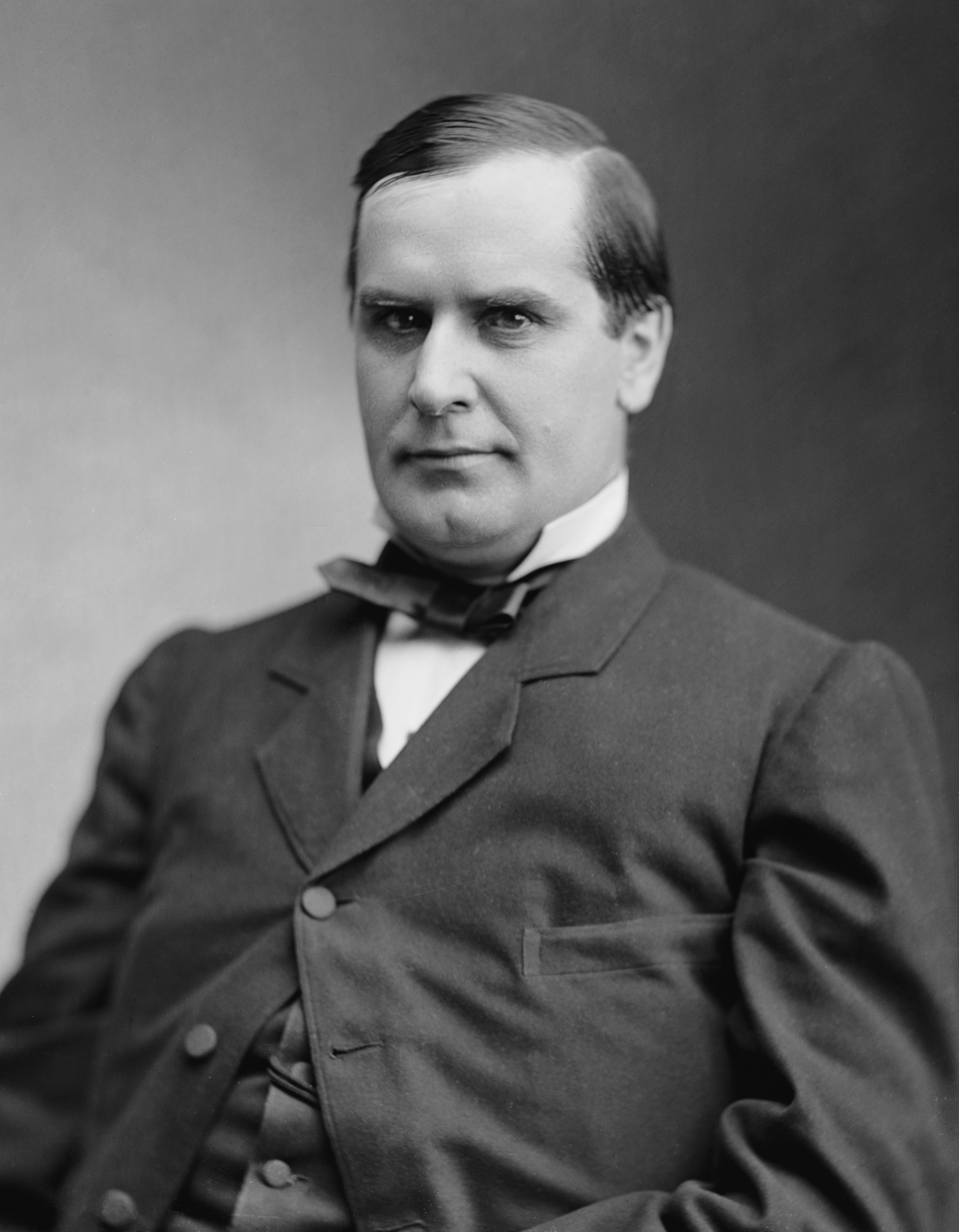
William McKinley, c. 1870–1880

It is uncertain when William McKinley and Mark Hanna first met—neither man in later life could remember the first meeting. McKinley, in 1896, referred to a friendship with Hanna that had lasted over twenty years; Hanna, in 1903, stated after some thought that he had met McKinley before 1876. McKinley biographer H. Wayne Morgan suggests that the two men may have met as early as 1871, although initially without making much impression on each other.

The two men certainly met in 1876, when McKinley, a lawyer, represented a number of coal miners who had gone on strike following attempts by owners to cut wages. Hanna was one of the mine owners affected by subsequent unrest. The militia, called in by Governor Rutherford Hayes to restore order, had fired on the strikers, and 23 miners were arrested and put on trial in Canton, Ohio, the hometown of Major McKinley (as he was often known, for his Civil War service). McKinley was hired to represent them, and only one was convicted. McKinley's victory won him the gratitude of labor elements in both major parties, and he won election to Congress later that year. Hanna remembered, "I became intimate with him soon after he entered Congress, and our friendship ripened with each succeeding year."

With Cowles's enmity ended by Hanna's sale of the Herald, the latter had little trouble being elected as a district delegate to the 1888 Republican National Convention. Among the delegates, at-large were Governor Foraker and Congressman McKinley. Hanna financed many of the arrangements for the Sherman campaign and was widely regarded as its manager. Sherman, as was customary at the time, remained in Washington and did not attend the convention in Chicago. There was widespread speculation in the press that Governor Foraker, nominally a Sherman supporter, would declare a favorite son candidacy or else support Blaine if he entered the race. The convention deadlocked, with Sherman in the lead but unable to secure the nomination. According to Hanna biographer Thomas Beer,

At the Republican convention of 1888, an accident displayed Major McKinley favorably to Marcus Hanna. A distinct faction, made up of men from every part of the country, approached him with a suggestion that he let himself be nominated. McKinley refused, and bluntly. He had come there pledged to support John Sherman and he would support John Sherman ... Mr. Hanna's admiration of Major McKinley was profuse. He appreciated men who stuck to a losing bargain.

McKinley began to pick up small numbers of votes although not a declared candidate. Hanna became convinced that McKinley was the only Ohioan who could gain the nomination, and by telegram hinted that Sherman should withdraw in the congressman's favor as the only Ohio Republican with a chance at the presidency. Sherman, believing this to be his best chance for election, refused, a decision which Hanna accepted, fighting for Sherman to the end. Hanna was greatly impressed by McKinley's loyal conduct in refusing to begin a run himself. Foraker threw his support to Blaine, though he returned to Sherman when the New Englander did not run. In the end, the nomination fell to former Indiana senator Benjamin Harrison. Hanna never forgave what he saw as Foraker's treason. After 1888, there was a strong dislike between the two men, and the separation split the Ohio Republican Party into two factions, a rupture that did not heal until after Hanna's death in 1904. Foraker stated in his memoirs that the break occurred because Hanna bribed black delegates from the South in 1888. However, Ohio newspaper publisher J. B. Morrow contradicted Foraker's account, stating: "I was at the convention in 1888 and know Senator Foraker [as he later became] brought great scandal to the Ohio people who were there and to the delegates with his secret work with Mr. Blaine's friends ... Mr. Hanna became thoroughly angered at what he thought was Senator Foraker's bad faith." According to Horner, Foraker was the more embittered of the two as the years passed, feeling that if it had not been for that dispute, Foraker, not McKinley, might have become president.

Harrison was elected president after a campaign in which Hanna fundraised considerably, consoling himself with the thought that though Harrison was from Indiana, he had at least been born in Ohio. Harrison gave Hanna no control of any patronage in return for his fundraising. In the aftermath of Harrison's victory, Hanna determined to bring an Ohioan to the presidency. With Harrison likely to be the Republican candidate in 1892, the first real chance would be in 1896. Sherman would be 73 in 1896, likely considered too old to seek the presidency. Hanna had come to admire McKinley; the two men shared many political views. Beginning in 1888, they forged an increasingly close relationship. According to McKinley biographer Margaret Leech:

In choosing McKinley as the object on which to lavish his energies, Hanna had not made a purely rational decision. He had been magnetized by a polar attraction. Cynical in his acceptance of contemporary political practices, Hanna was drawn to McKinley's scruples and idealistic standards, like a hardened man of the world who becomes infatuated with virgin innocence.

However, Hanna biographer Clarence A. Stern suggested that while the industrialist admired McKinley's loyalty to Sherman, the principal reason that he decided to promote McKinley's career was the congressman's advocacy of high tariffs, which he also favored.

Hanna and his allies, such as Congressman Benjamin Butterworth, opposed Foraker's effort to secure a third term as governor in 1889. Foraker gained renomination, but fell in the general election. In November 1889, Hanna traveled to Washington to manage McKinley's campaign for Speaker of the House. The effort failed; another Republican, Thomas B. Reed of Maine, was elected.

In 1890 McKinley was defeated for re-election to Congress. This was not seen as a major setback to his career; he was deemed beaten by Democratic gerrymandering in redistricting, and because of his sponsorship of a tariff bill—the increased tariffs had caused prices to rise. In 1891, McKinley proved the consensus choice for the Republican nomination for governor. With McKinley's candidacy needing little of his attention, Hanna spent much of his time working to secure Sherman's re-election by the Ohio Legislature (senators were elected by state legislatures until the ratification of the 17th Amendment in 1913) by raising funds to gain the election of Republican candidates. Hanna traveled as far away from Ohio as New York and Iowa, soliciting funds, some of which went to McKinley, but which for the most part went to the state Republican committee.

Victories by McKinley in the gubernatorial race and by the Republicans in securing a majority in the legislature in 1891 did not guarantee Sherman another term, as he was challenged for his seat by Foraker. Hanna was instrumental in keeping enough Republican support to secure victory by Sherman in the Republican caucus, assuring his election by the legislature. Hanna hired detectives to find legislators who had gone into hiding and were believed to be Foraker supporters, and saw to it they supported Sherman. Stern notes that the defeat of Foraker "was ascribable largely to the efforts of Hanna". McKinley's victory in what was generally a bad year for Republicans made him a possible presidential contender, and Hanna's involvement in the McKinley and Sherman victories established him as a force in politics. President Harrison attempted to neutralize Hanna, who was ill-disposed to the President and likely to oppose his renomination, by offering to make him treasurer of the Republican National Committee. Hanna declined, feeling it would make him beholden to the administration.

=== Preparing for a run ===
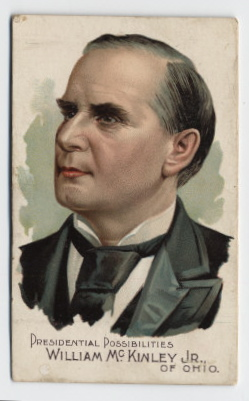
Although McKinley did not run in 1892, the Duke Tobacco Company considered him a presidential possibility that year and issued a card for him.

As early as 1892, McKinley and Hanna began to prepare for the 1896 campaign. Charles Dick recalled being asked to take the Republican state chairmanship:

I went first to see Governor McKinley. He urged me to accept and asked me to see Mr. Hanna, which I did the next day. The reasons both urged were that the campaigns from 1892 down to 1896 must be conducted with a view to bringing about McKinley's nomination in 1896. McKinley spoke of it and so did Mr. Hanna.

President Harrison had proven unpopular even in his own party, and with the start of 1892, McKinley was talked about as a potential candidate. At the 1892 Republican National Convention in Minneapolis, McKinley's keynote address sparked wild applause from a convention friendly to him. This popularity did not translate into delegate votes; Harrison's supporters were in control of the convention throughout. Hanna, a delegate from Ohio, promoted McKinley to delegates. McKinley, never a declared candidate, finished third, a fraction of a vote behind Blaine, who had declared himself not to be a candidate. Despite Harrison's success, McKinley was carried from the convention hall to his hotel by supporters after he adjourned the convention. According to Morgan, many delegates "saw in [McKinley] their nominee for 1896".

Harrison and his adherents were unimpressed by McKinley's conduct, recalling that he had cut off talk of a candidacy in 1888, but had not done so in 1892. Nevertheless, Hanna wrote in a letter that "I do not consider that Governor McKinley was placed in any false position by what was done ... Governor McKinley's position today as a result of all that transpired at Minneapolis is in the best possible shape for his future. His bearing and conduct and personal magnetism won the hearts and respect of everybody." McKinley campaigned loyally for President Harrison, who was defeated by former president Cleveland in the November election, and according to the governor's secretary, Charles Bawsel, "[McKinley] is bound to be the nominee for the presidency, and the very fact of the defeat this year will elect him the next time."

Among those who suffered reverses in the financial Panic of 1893 was a McKinley friend in Youngstown. McKinley, out of gratitude for loans in his younger days, had guaranteed the friend's business notes, without ever grasping the full amount of the obligations he was taking on. He was called upon to pay over $100,000 and proposed to resign as governor and earn the money as an attorney. Hanna was absent from the state when the crisis broke, causing the governor to say "I wish Mark was here." McKinley's wealthy supporters, including Hanna once he learned of the situation, undertook to buy up or pay the notes. McKinley was reluctant to take gifts, and eventually agreed to accept money only from those who expected nothing by lending the money but repayment. Even though both McKinley and his wife Ida insisted on putting their property in the hands of the supporters, who served as trustees, Hanna and his associates fundraised with such success from business owners and the general public that all McKinley property was returned intact, and when President McKinley died in 1901, no claims were made against his estate. A request by McKinley for the names of the subscribers so he might repay them was refused by the trustees. The episode made McKinley more popular with the public, as many Americans had suffered in the hard times and sympathized with the Ohio governor.

McKinley was easily re-elected as governor in 1893. Despite the poor economic times in Ohio, he remained popular and spoke across much of the nation for Republican candidates. He followed the usual Ohio custom and stepped down at the end of two two-year terms, returning home to Canton in January 1896 to municipal celebrations. The Canton Repository stated, "It is just plain Mr. McKinley of Canton now, but wait a little while." To devote full-time to McKinley's presidential campaign, Hanna in 1895 turned over management of his companies to his brother Leonard. Mark Hanna was certain, as he stated as McKinley's campaign began, that "nothing short of a miracle or death will prevent his being the nominee of the party in '96".

== Campaign of 1896 ==
=== Nominating McKinley ===
After leaving business, Hanna rented a house in Thomasville, Georgia, expressing a dislike for northern winters. He was joined there by the McKinleys in 1895, even before the governor left office, and also in the winter of 1896. The location was a plausibly nonpolitical vacation spot for McKinley and also permitted him to meet many southern Republicans, including blacks. Although southern Republicans rarely had local electoral success, they elected a substantial number of delegates to the national convention.

During 1895, Hanna journeyed east to meet with political bosses such as Senators Matthew Quay of Pennsylvania and Thomas Platt of New York. When Hanna returned to Canton, he informed McKinley that the bosses would guarantee his nomination in exchange for control of local patronage. McKinley was unwilling to make such a deal, and Hanna duly undertook to gain the former governor's nomination without machine support.

Historian R. Hal Williams summarized the relationship between McKinley and Hanna:

McKinley and Hanna made an effective team. The Major commanded, decided general strategies, selected issues and programs. He stressed ideals ... Hanna organized, built coalitions, performed the rougher work for which McKinley had neither taste nor energy. Importantly, they shared a Hamiltonian faith in the virtue of industrialism, central authority, and expansive capitalism. That faith, triumphant in the 1896 presidential election, became one of the reasons for the vital importance of that election.

Through the months leading up to the Republican convention in June in St. Louis, Hanna built his organization, paying for expenses, and applying the techniques of business to politics. Hanna met with many politicians at his Cleveland home. He paid for thousands of copies of McKinley's speeches to be printed and shipped quantities of McKinley posters, badges, and buttons across the nation. New Hampshire Senator William E. Chandler commented, "If Mr. Hanna has covered every district in the United States, in the same manner, he did those in Alabama, McKinley will be nominated."

McKinley's most formidable rival for the nomination was former president Harrison, but in February 1896, Harrison declared he would not run for president a third time. The eastern bosses were hostile to McKinley for failing to agree to the offer they had made to Hanna, and they decided to seek support for local favorite son candidates, believing that McKinley could be forced to bargain for support at the convention if he was denied a majority. The bosses supported candidates such as Speaker Reed, Senator Quay and former vice president Levi P. Morton of New York. Hanna spent much money and effort to undercut Reed in his native New England, and on "McKinley Clubs" in Pennsylvania to force Quay to spend time and money shoring up his base.

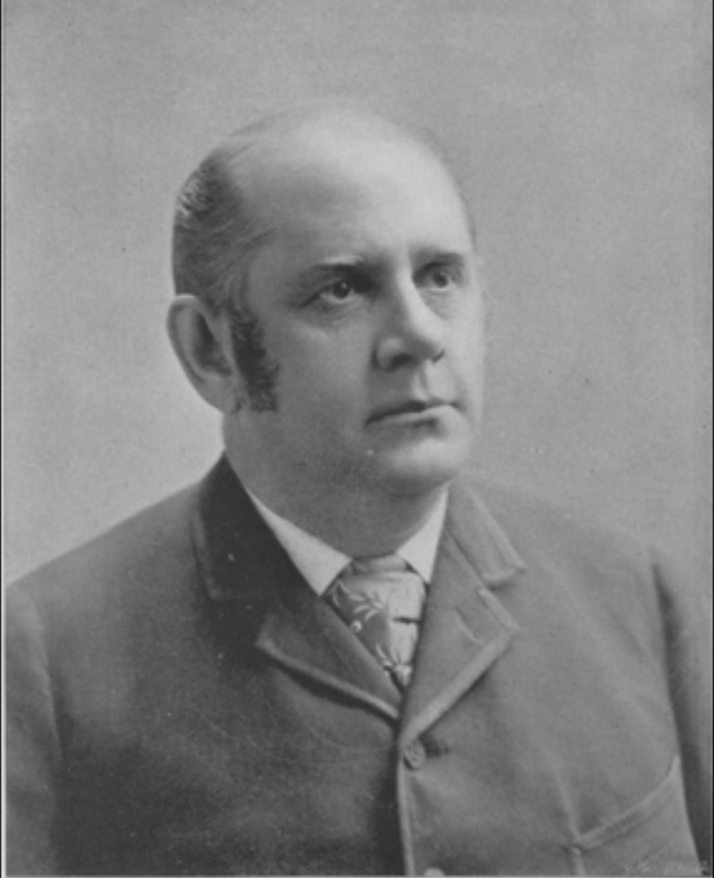
Hanna after his election as Chairman of the Republican National Committee, 1896

A key to defeating the bosses' "favorite son" strategy was Illinois. A young Chicago businessman and McKinley supporter, Charles Dawes (who would thirty years later be vice president under Coolidge) worked at Illinois district and state conventions to elect delegates pledged to McKinley. Dawes and Hanna worked closely together, with the latter relying on the young entrepreneur to secure support from his connections in the Chicago business community. Despite the opposition of Illinois's Republican political machine, Dawes and Hanna were able to secure all but a few of Illinois's delegates for McKinley, giving the former Ohio governor a strong advantage going into the convention. According to Williams, "As early as March 1896, the bandwagon had become a steamroller." As the convention approached, journalists awoke to the fact that McKinley would, most likely, be the Republican nominee. Those newspapers that were Democratic in their outlook, including publisher William Randolph Hearst's New York Journal, sent reporters to Canton to dig up dirt on McKinley. The candidate had a sterling reputation for personal and political honesty, and reporters found that even McKinley's few personal enemies spoke well of him. McKinley's financial problem in 1893 was one of the few marks on his record, and the newspapers began to suggest that those who had made large contributions to aid him would own him as president. Attacks on some of McKinley's associates, such as Chicago publisher H. H. Kohlsaat or McKinley's old friend from his days as a practicing lawyer, Judge William R. Day, cut little ice with voters; the press had better luck with Hanna. The Journal began to describe McKinley's backers as a "Syndicate", staking money to secure a bought-and-paid-for president. Journal reporter Alfred Henry Lewis attracted considerable attention when he wrote, "Hanna and the others will shuffle and deal him like a pack of cards."

In St. Louis, the bosses again tried to secure political favors in exchange for their support; with little need to deal, Hanna, backed by McKinley via telephone from Canton, refused. McKinley was nominated easily. To balance the ticket, McKinley and Hanna selected New Jersey party official and former state legislator Garret Hobart, an easterner, as vice-presidential candidate. The convention duly nominated Hobart; Hanna was elected chairman of the Republican National Committee for the next four years.

=== Currency question and Democratic nomination ===
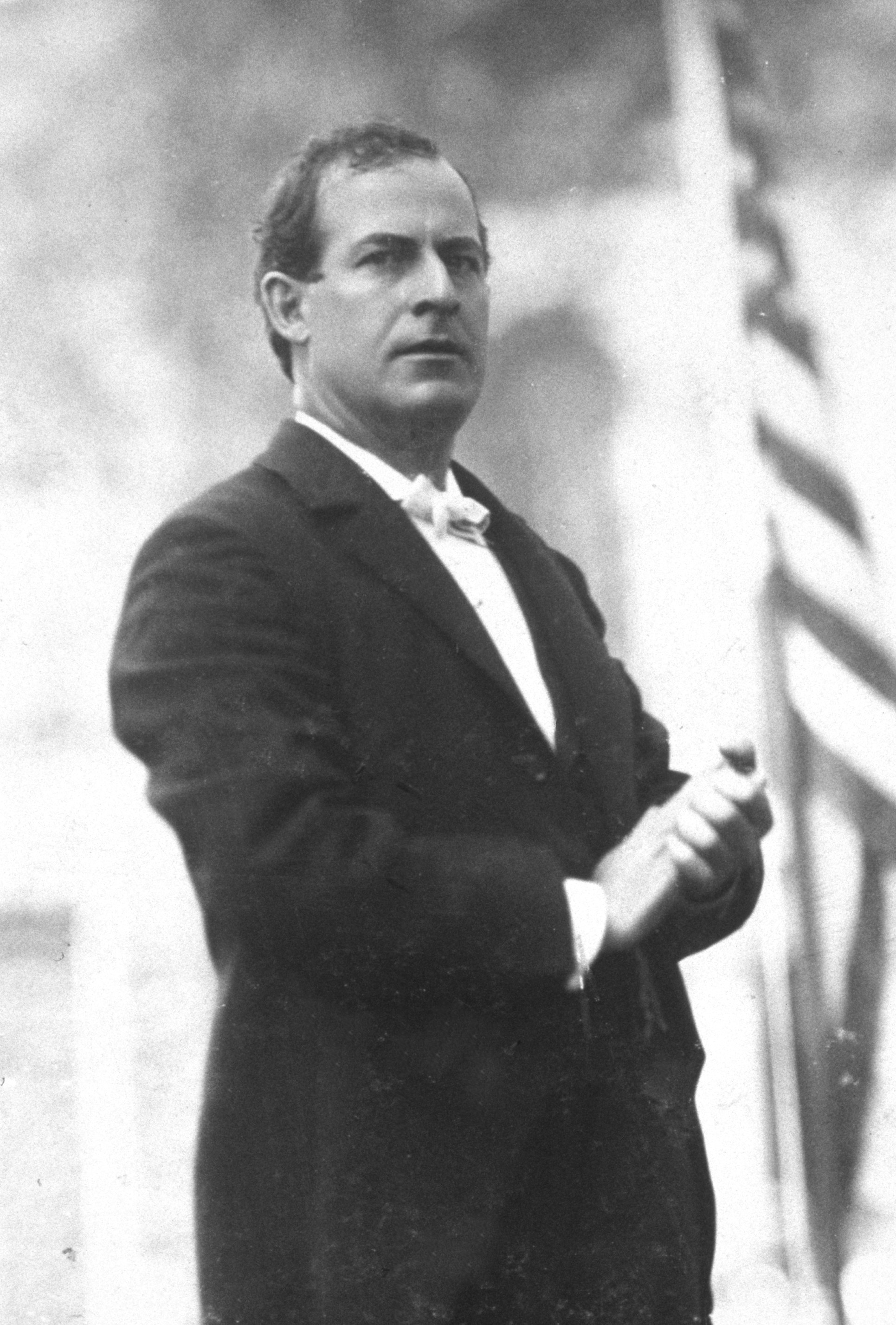
William Jennings Bryan, seen during the 1896 campaign.

A major issue, going into the 1896 election cycle, was the question of the currency. The United States, since 1873, had effectively been on the gold standard—the metal, if presented to the government, would be assayed and struck into coin for a slight charge to cover expenses. Silver, in contrast, though widely mined, could not be presented for conversion into coin, but had to be sold as a commodity. The gold standard was unpopular in many agricultural and mining areas, as the quantity of gold available limited the money supply, making it difficult for farmers to obtain loans and pay debts. Advocates of the free and unlimited coinage of silver believed that doing so would cure the country's economic malaise by increasing the money supply. Advocates of the gold standard argued that a "free silver" policy (sometimes called "bimetallism") would inflate the currency, and lead to difficulties in international trade with nations on the gold standard. At the time, the precious metal in a silver dollar was worth about $0.53, and under such proposals, silver worth that much would be returned to depositors as a one-dollar coin, "free"—that is, without a charge for the Mint's costs for assaying and coining.

Despite the controversy in the country, McKinley and Hanna decided that an explicit mention of the gold standard in the party platform would be a better strategy than remaining silent on the issue. McKinley sent Hanna to the convention with a draft plank calling for maintenance of the gold standard, which Hanna successfully placed in the party platform. The adoption of the plank caused some Republicans, mostly from the West, to walk out of the convention. As they left, Hanna stood on a chair, shouting "Go! Go! Go!"

McKinley expected the election to be fought on the issue of tariffs; he was a well-known protectionist. The Democrats met in convention in July in Chicago; former Missouri congressman Richard P. Bland was deemed likely to be the nominee. As McKinley awaited his opponent, he privately commented on the nationwide debate over silver, stating to his Canton crony, Judge Day, that "This money matter is unduly prominent. In thirty days you won't hear anything about it." The future Secretary of State and Supreme Court justice responded: "In my opinion in thirty days you won't hear of anything else."

On the third day of the Democratic convention, former Nebraska representative William Jennings Bryan concluded the debate on the party platform. Bryan stampeded the convention with what came to be known as the "Cross of Gold speech", decrying the gold standard, which he believed disproportionately hurt the working classes. To the horror of Wall Street, the Democrats nominated Congressman Bryan for president, a nomination in which the Populist Party soon joined. Hanna had taken a yachting vacation in early July before beginning general election work; with a wave of popular support for Bryan, Hanna wrote "The Chicago convention has changed everything" and returned to his labors.

=== General election campaign ===
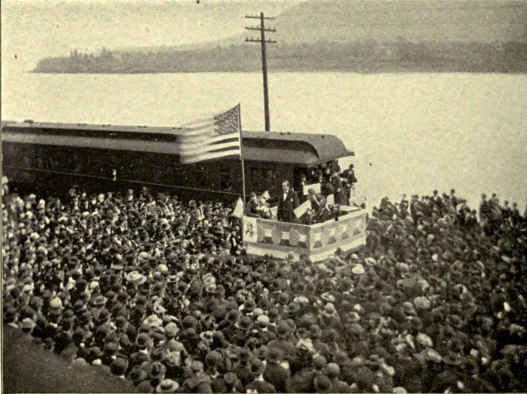
Bryan's whistle-stop tour during the 1896 campaign was unprecedented. Here he addresses a crowd in Wellsville, Ohio.

According to Horner, "In 1896, as the country was mired in an economic slowdown that affected millions, a real, substantive policy debate was conducted by candidates who believed firmly in their respective positions." Bryan, whose campaign was ill-financed, felt that his best means of persuading the voter of his position was personal communication, and embarked on an unprecedented itinerary of whistle stop appearances by train. If the train passed any large group of homes and did not stop for Bryan to speak, it would at least disgorge a bundle of political tracts for local distribution. McKinley felt he could not match Bryan's speaking tour, as the Democrat was a better stump speaker. Despite Hanna's urgings to the candidate to get on the road, the former governor decided on a front porch campaign; he would remain at home in Canton and allow the people to come to him. As McKinley's wife, Ida, was an invalid, this also boosted his image as a good husband.

When McKinley, Hanna and their associates saw the emotional appeal of the Bryan campaign for free silver, they decided upon an extensive and expensive effort to educate the electorate. The McKinley campaign had two main offices; one in Chicago, effectively run by Dawes, and one in New York, used by Hanna as a base of operations as he sought to gain support from New York financiers. Hanna's task was to raise the money; other campaign officials, such as Dawes, determined how to spend it. Being relatively unknown on the national scene, Hanna initially had little success, despite Wall Street's fear of Bryan. Some Wall Street titans, although disliking Bryan's positions, did not take him seriously as a candidate and refused to contribute to the McKinley campaign. Those who did know Hanna, such as his old schoolmate Rockefeller—the magnate's Standard Oil gave $250,000—vouched for him. Beginning in late July 1896, Hanna had an easier time persuading industrialists to give to the McKinley/Hobart campaign. J.P. Morgan entertained him aboard the Corsair II and he obtained money from other bankers. Hanna also gave large sums himself. This money went to pay for advertising, brochures, printed speeches and other means of persuading the voter; the country was flooded with such paper.

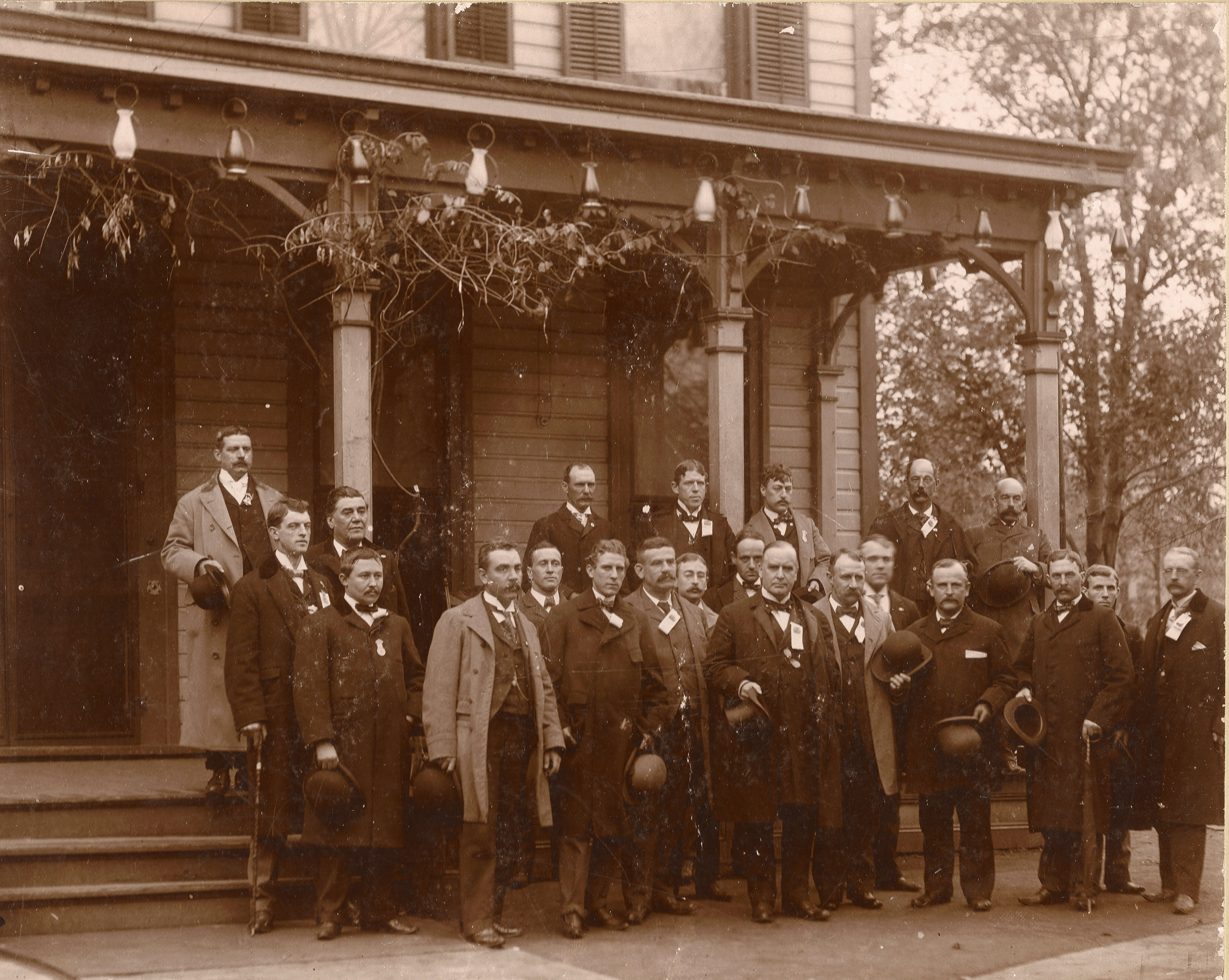
McKinley (center) with a delegation in front of the famous front porch

According to Rhodes, McKinley "spoke from the front veranda of his house in Canton to many deputations, some of them spontaneous, others arranged for." Any delegation was welcome in Canton, so long as its leader wrote to McKinley in advance and introduced himself and his group. Delegations ranged up to thousands of people; if possible, delegation leaders were brought to Canton in advance to settle with McKinley what each would say. If this could not be arranged, the delegation was met at the train station by a McKinley agent, who would greet it and learn what the leader proposed to say in his address. The agent would suggest any fine-tuning necessary to make it fit within campaign themes, and send the information ahead by runner to McKinley, giving him time to prepare his response. The delegations left behind gifts, which were put to use when possible, but four eagles, named "McKinley", "Mark Hanna","Republican", and "Protection", were donated to the local zoo.

Despite the initial popularity of Bryan's message, Hanna was convinced the Democrat's support would recede. "He's talking Silver all the time, and that's where we've got him", Hanna stated, pounding his desk, in July. He proved correct; the silver enthusiasm waned by September and Bryan had no ready replacement for it. McKinley, on the other hand, convinced that his "sound money" campaign had worked, began to promote his tariff issue, stating to the crowds on his front lawn, "I do not know what you think about it, but I believe it is a good deal better to open the mills of the United States to the labor of America than to open the mints of the United States to the silver of the world."

An 1896 cartoon by Homer Davenport depicting McKinley as being firmly in Hanna's pocket.

During the campaign, the Democratic newspapers, especially the papers owned by Hearst, attacked Hanna for his supposed role as McKinley's political master. The articles and cartoons have contributed to a lasting popular belief that McKinley was not his own man, but that he was effectively owned by the corporations, through Hanna. Homer Davenport's cartoons for the Hearst papers were especially effective in molding public opinion about Hanna. The Clevelander was often depicted as "Dollar Mark", in a suit decorated with dollar signs (a term for which "dollar mark" was a common alternative). McKinley's personal financial crisis allowed him to be convincingly depicted as a child, helpless in the hands of businessmen and their mere tool in the 1896 campaign. Historian Stanley Jones, who studied the 1896 election, stated of this view:

The popularly accepted picture of Hanna's domination was not true. Though McKinley did leave to Hanna the immensely complicated and exceedingly arduous task of organizing the campaign and although he usually deferred to Hanna's judgment in this area, he himself retained control of the general structure and program. Nothing of significance was done without his approval. Hanna raised money, hired men, established headquarters offices, bought literature, with the same drive and skill that he managed his business. He was confident of his mastery of that kind of operation, but he never ceased to defer to McKinley's mastery of the grand strategy of politics.

Hanna's fundraising campaign, in which he asked banks and millionaires for a contribution equal to 0.25% of their assets, was unprecedented in its scale, but the basic concept was not unusual. According to Hanna biographer Croly, "Mr. Hanna merely systematized and developed a practice which was rooted deep in contemporary American political soil, and which was sanctioned both by custom and, as he believed, by necessity." The largest election fundraising before that time had occurred in the 1888 presidential race, which was a polarizing election, closely fought over the tariff issue. In the 1888 campaign, Senator Quay (on behalf of Harrison) had sought funds from businessmen much as Hanna would eight years later. The first Harrison campaign raised about $1.8 million; Dawes, in charge of campaign spending for the Republicans in 1896, later stated that the McKinley campaign raised just over $3.5 million, though this did not include spending by state and local committees. In addition, the Republicans were supported by "in-kind" corporate contributions, such as discounted railway fares for delegations coming to Canton. These discounts were so steep that they led to the quip that it was cheaper to visit Canton than to stay at home. Contributions to Bryan's campaign were much smaller; he had few wealthy supporters and the largest donor was most likely Hearst; he donated about $40,000, and gave the Bryan campaign support in his papers.

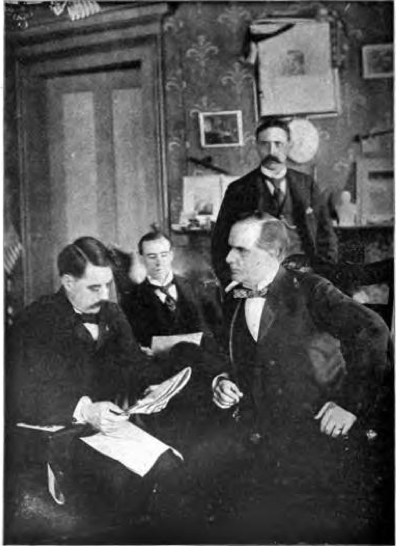
In addition to giving speeches from his front porch in 1896, McKinley (lower right) gave orders for the conduct of his campaign from the library of his Canton home.

In late October, Hanna wrote to Harrison, thanking him for his campaigning efforts, "The outlook is generally encouraging, and I feel there is no doubt of our success." On Tuesday, November 3, the voters had their say in most states. McKinley won 271 electoral votes to Bryan's 176. The Democratic candidate won in the South and in the western states except California and Oregon. Bryan was also successful in his native Nebraska and neighboring Kansas and South Dakota. McKinley swept the populous northeastern states and the Midwest. He had hoped to end sectionalism, but his only successes in the "Solid South" were in the border states of Delaware, Maryland, West Virginia and Kentucky. McKinley took 51.0% of the vote, the first presidential majority since Grant in 1872; the intense voter interest in the campaign resulted in a turnout of 79.3%. On election night, Hanna wired from Cleveland to Canton, "The feeling here beggars description ... I will not attempt bulletins. You are elected to the highest office of the land by a people who always loved and trusted you."

On November 12, 1896, the President-elect wrote to his longtime friend, offering him a position in his Cabinet, and stating:

We are through with the election, and before turning to the future I want to express to you my great debt of gratitude for your generous life-long and devoted service to me. Was there ever such unselfish devotion before? Your unfaltering and increasing friendship through more than twenty years has been to me an encouragement and a source of strength which I am sure you have never realized, but which I have constantly felt and for which I thank you from the bottom of my heart. The recollection of all those years of uninterrupted loyalty and affection, of mutual confidences and growing regard fill me with emotions too deep for the pen to portray. I want you to know, but I cannot find the right words to tell you, how much I appreciate your friendship and faith.

== Senator (1897–1904) ==
=== McKinley advisor (1897–1901) ===
==== Securing a Senate seat ====
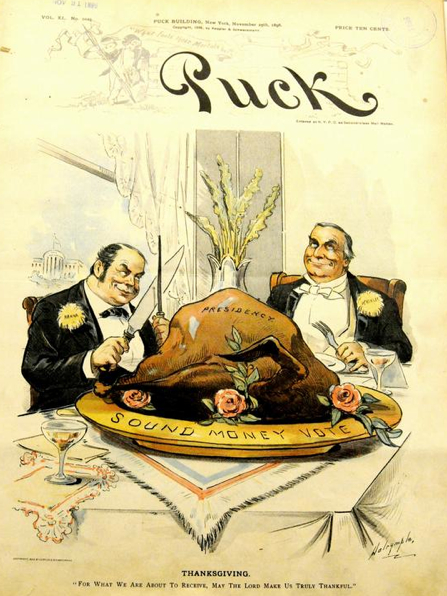
1896 Puck cover showing Hanna (left) and McKinley's Thanksgiving dinner—carving up the presidency.

In the wake of McKinley's election, according to historian James Ford Rhodes (who was also Hanna's brother-in-law, though a Democrat), "Mark Hanna occupied an enviable position. Had it been usual, the freedom of Cleveland would have been conferred upon him." According to John Hay, who would later become Secretary of State under McKinley, "What a glorious record Mark Hanna has made this year! I never knew him intimately until we went into this fight together, but my esteem and admiration for him have grown every hour."

Hanna stated that he would accept no office in the McKinley administration, as he feared it would be seen as a reward for his political efforts. He had long wished to be a senator, speaking of this desire as early as 1892. Senator Sherman, now aged almost 74, would face a difficult re-election battle with the Democrats and the Foraker faction in 1898. On January 4, 1897, McKinley offered Sherman the office of Secretary of State; he immediately accepted. The poor record Sherman posted prior to his departure from office in 1898 led to attacks on Hanna, suggesting that a senile man had been placed in a key Cabinet position to accommodate him. Foraker, in his memoirs, strongly implied that Sherman was moved out of the way to allow Hanna to have his Senate seat. An embittered Sherman stated in a letter after his departure as secretary, "When [McKinley] urged me to accept the position of Secretary of State, I accepted with some reluctance and largely to promote the wishes of Mark Hanna. The result was that I lost the position both of Senator and Secretary ... They deprived me of the high office of Senator by the temporary appointment as Secretary of State."

Horner argues that the position of Secretary of State was the most important non-elective post in government, then often seen as a stepping stone to the presidency, and though Sherman no longer sought to be president, he was aware of the prestige. According to Rhodes, "Sherman was glad to accept the Secretaryship of State. He exchanged two years in the Senate with a doubtful succession for apparently a four years' tenure of the Cabinet head of the new Republican administration, which was undoubtedly a promotion." Rhodes suggested that Hanna did not give credence to warnings about Sherman's mental capacity in early 1897, though some of those tales must have been told by New York businessmen whom he trusted. The stories were not believed by McKinley either; the President-elect in February 1897 called accounts of Sherman's mental decay "the cheap inventions of sensational writers or other evil-disposed or mistaken people".

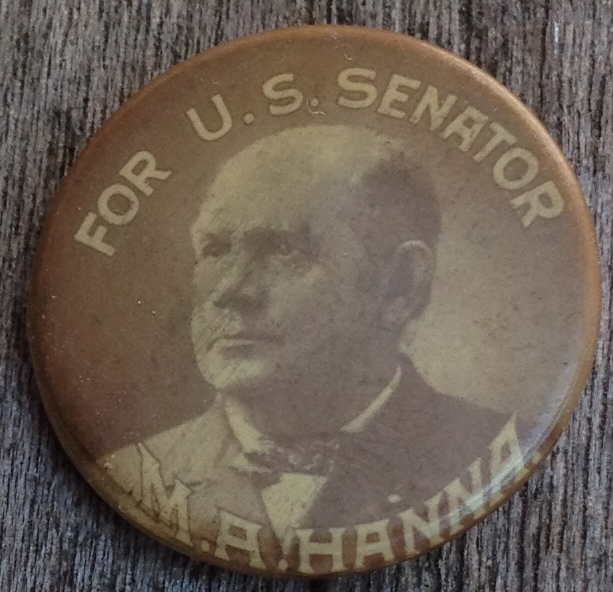
A promotional button from Mark Hanna's U.S. Senate campaign.

Sherman's acceptance of the post of Secretary of State did not assure Hanna of succeeding him as senator. A temporary appointment to the Senate was to be made by Ohio's governor, Republican Asa Bushnell; the legislature would then, in 1898, hold elections both for the final portion of Sherman's term (expiring in March 1899) and for the full six-year term to follow. Bushnell was of the Foraker faction—Foraker was by then a senator-elect, selected by the legislature to fill Ohio's other Senate seat for the term 1897 to 1903. Sherman, who was at that time still grateful for his Cabinet appointment, used his influence on Hanna's behalf; so did McKinley. Governor Bushnell did not want to appoint a leader of the opposing faction and authorized Foraker to offer the place to Representative Theodore E. Burton, who declined it. Rhodes suggests that the difficulty over obtaining a Senate seat for Hanna led McKinley to persist in his offer to make his friend Postmaster General into mid-February 1897. Bushnell was a candidate for renomination and re-election in 1897; without Hanna's support his chances were smaller, and on February 21, Bushnell wrote to Hanna that he would appoint him in Sherman's place. Foraker, in his memoirs, stated that Hanna was given the Senate seat because of McKinley's desires.

The 1897 legislative elections in Ohio would determine who would vote on Hanna's bid for election for a full six-year term, and were seen as a referendum on McKinley's first year in office—the President visited Ohio to give several speeches, as did Bryan. McKinley was active behind the scenes, urging Republicans both inside and outside Ohio to support the senator. The 1897 Ohio Republican convention voted to support Hanna, as did county conventions in 84 of Ohio's 88 counties. The Republicans won the election, with the overwhelming number of Republican victors pledged to vote for Hanna. However, a number of Republicans, most of the Foraker faction, did not want to re-elect Hanna and formed an alliance with the Democrats.

When the legislature met on January 3, 1898, the anti-Hanna forces succeeded in organizing both houses of the legislature. The dissidents had not yet agreed upon a candidate; after several days of negotiation, they settled on the Republican mayor of Cleveland, Robert McKisson. The Cleveland mayor was the insurgents' candidate for both the short and long Senate term and had been elected in 1895 to his municipal position despite the opposition of Hanna and the Cleveland business community. Rumors flew in Columbus that legislators had been kidnapped by either or both sides, and allegations of bribery were made. James Rudolph Garfield, the late president's son, stated that he had been told by one Republican from Cleveland that he had to vote for McKisson because if he did not, his contracts to sell the city brick pavers would be cut off. According to Horner,

Given Hanna's determination to win and his willingness to play by the rules as they existed, money may have changed hands during the campaign, but if it did, it is important to remember the context. If Hanna engaged in such behavior, that was the way the game was played on both sides ... Hanna, of course, was not without resources. It is helpful, for example, when you are good friends with the president of the United States, a man also personally very influential in Ohio politics.

In the end, "Hanna's tactics—whatever they really were" succeeded; he was re-elected with the barest possible majority.

==== Relationship with the President ====
Mark Hanna and William McKinley continued their friendship as they assumed their offices in March 1897. Senator Hanna was looking for a residence; President McKinley suggested that he stay at the Executive Mansion (as the White House was still formally known) until he found one. According to Hearst's New York Journal, "the Senator doubtless feels that if anyone has the right to make himself at home in the White House he is the man". Hanna soon moved into the Arlington Hotel, close to the White House, where he occupied a large suite. After the death of Vice President Hobart in November 1899, Hanna took over the lease on his house on Lafayette Square, across Pennsylvania Avenue from the White House.

Despite civil service reform, a president had a large number of posts to fill. It was customary at the time to fill many of the lower level positions with party political workers. Hanna had a voice in some of McKinley's appointments, but the President made the final decision. Hanna was allowed to recommend candidates for the majority of federal positions in Ohio and was permitted a veto over Foraker's candidates. Hanna was also dominant in the South, where there were few Republican congressmen to lobby the President. He and McKinley decided on a system where many southern appointees were recommended by the state's member of the Republican National Committee and the defeated Republican congressional candidate for the area in question. Hanna and McKinley gave few places to those who had served under Harrison, as the two presidents were not friendly. "Silver Republicans", who had bolted the party at the convention or later, received nothing.

Although Hanna was reputed to control the administration's patronage, in fact, other men were more influential. McKinley's friend Joseph Smith, who had served as State Librarian of Ohio during McKinley's tenure as governor, probably had more influence over federal jobs until his death in 1898. Charles Dawes, who was slated to be Comptroller of the Currency as soon as the incumbent left office, was also a McKinley confidant. Joseph Bristow, whose duties as Fourth Assistant Postmaster General under McKinley involved patronage appointments, later wrote that the President "gave Hanna's requests great consideration and had confidence in the clearness of his opinion, but in the end he always followed his own judgment".

As the year 1900 began, Hanna hinted that he might not want to run McKinley's re-election campaign, stating that he was suffering from rheumatism. In spite of his statement, the senator did want to run the campaign, but McKinley (who apparently saw an opportunity to show the public that he was not Hanna's creature) was slow to ask him. This was a source of great stress to Hanna, who was concerned about the campaign and his relationship with McKinley; the senator fainted in his office during the wait and may have suffered a heart attack. In late May, the President announced that Hanna would run his campaign. Margaret Leech suggested that McKinley was angry at Hanna for unknown reasons, thus the President's "uncharacteristic coldness". Morgan, in contrast, wrote that "the president was using his usual indirect pressure and the power of silence. He wanted and needed Hanna, but on his own terms."

==== Spanish–American War ====
Even during the second Cleveland administration, Americans took keen interest in the ongoing revolt in Cuba, then a Spanish colony. Most Americans believed that Cuba should be independent and that Spain should leave the Western Hemisphere. Beginning in 1895, Congress passed a number of resolutions calling for Cuban independence. Although Cleveland pursued a policy of neutrality, his Secretary of State, Richard Olney, warned Spain that the patience of the United States was not inexhaustible. Sherman, then a senator, favored neutrality but believed that the US would inevitably go to war over Cuba. Soon after Hanna was appointed to the Senate, McKinley called Congress into special session to consider tariff legislation. Despite the stated purpose of the session, a number of resolutions were introduced calling for independence for Cuba, by force if necessary. When the press asked Hanna if he felt there would be action on Cuba during the session, he responded: "I don't know. You can't tell about that. A spark might drop in there at any time and precipitate action."

Through 1897, McKinley maintained neutrality on Cuba, hoping to negotiate autonomy for the island. Nevertheless, pro-war elements, prominently including the Hearst newspapers, pressured McKinley for a more aggressive foreign policy. On May 20, 1897, the Senate passed a resolution favoring intervention in Cuba, 41–14, with Hanna in the minority. As the crisis slowly built through late 1897 and early 1898, Hanna became concerned about the political damage if McKinley, against popular opinion, kept the nation out of war. "Look out for Mr. Bryan. Everything that goes wrong will be in the Democratic platform in 1900. You can be damn sure of that!" Nevertheless, the Ohio senator believed that McKinley's policy of quietly pressing Spain for colonial reform in Cuba had already yielded results without war, and would continue to do so.

On February 15, 1898, the American warship Maine sank in Havana harbor. Over 250 officers and men were killed. It was (and is) unclear if the explosion which caused Maine's sinking was from an external cause or internal fault. McKinley ordered a board of inquiry while asking the nation to withhold judgment pending the result, but he also quietly prepared for war. The Hearst newspapers, with the slogan, "Remember the Maine and to hell with Spain!" pounded a constant drumbeat for war and blamed Hanna for the delay. According to the Hearst papers, the Ohio senator was the true master in the White House, and was vetoing war as bad for business. Hearst's New York Journal editorialized in March 1898:

Senator Hanna, fresh from the bargain for a seat in the United States Senate, probably felt the need of recouping his Ohio expenses as well as helping his financial friends out of the hole when he began playing American patriotism against Wall Street money ... Hanna said there would be no war. He spoke as one having authority. His edict meant that Uncle Sam might be kicked and cuffed from one continent to another.

As the nation waited for the report of the board of inquiry, many who favored war deemed McKinley too timid. Hanna and the President were burned in effigy in Virginia. Assistant Secretary of the Navy Theodore Roosevelt shook his fist under Hanna's nose at the Gridiron Dinner and stated, "We will have this war for the freedom of Cuba in spite of the timidity of the commercial classes!" Nevertheless, Hanna supported McKinley's patient policy and acted as his point man in the Senate on the war issue.

The Navy's report blamed an external cause, believed by many to be a Spanish mine or bomb, for the sinking of Maine (modern reports have suggested an internal explosion within a coal bunker). Despite the increased calls for war, McKinley hoped to preserve peace. However, when it became clear that the United States would accept nothing but Cuban independence, which the Spanish were not prepared to grant, negotiations broke off. On April 11, McKinley asked Congress for authority to secure Cuban independence, using force if necessary. Hanna supported McKinley in obtaining that authority, though he stated privately, "If Congress had started this, I'd break my neck to stop it." Spain broke off diplomatic relations on April 20; Congress declared war five days later, retroactive to April 21.

The war resulted in a complete American victory. Nevertheless, Hanna was uncomfortable with the conflict. He stated during the war to a member of the public, "Remember that my folks were Quakers. War is just a damn nuisance." After the Battle of El Caney, he viewed the American casualty lists and stated, "Oh, God, now we'll have this sort of thing again!" After the war, Hanna supported McKinley's decision to annex Spanish colonies such as Puerto Rico and Guam.

==== Campaign of 1900 ====
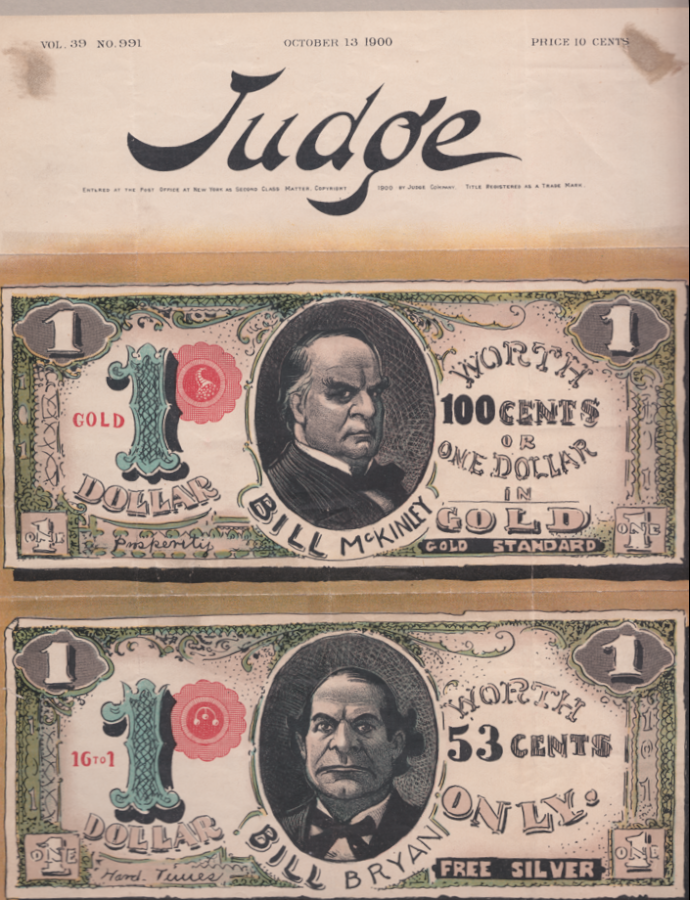
Although the currency question was not as prominent in 1900 as in 1896 this Judge magazine cover shows it still played its part in the campaign.

Vice President Hobart had died in late 1899. President McKinley was content to leave the choice of a vice presidential candidate for 1900 to the upcoming Republican convention. New York Senator Platt disliked his state's governor, former Assistant Secretary of the Navy Theodore Roosevelt, who had pursued a reformist agenda in his year and a half in office. Platt hoped to sideline Roosevelt politically by making him vice president. Roosevelt was a popular choice in any event because of his well-publicized service during the Spanish–American War, and Platt had little trouble persuading state delegations to vote for Roosevelt after McKinley's renomination. Quay was a close Platt ally in the effort to make Roosevelt vice president. Hanna, who felt Roosevelt was overly impulsive, did not want him on the ticket, but did not realize that the efforts were serious until he was already at the convention in Philadelphia. As many of the delegates were political appointees, Hanna hoped to persuade McKinley to use patronage to get the delegates to vote for another candidate. After emerging from the telephone booth from which he had tried and failed to get McKinley to agree, Senator Hanna stated, "Do whatever you damn please! I'm through! I won't have anything more to do with the convention! I won't take charge of the campaign! I won't be chairman of the national committee again!" When asked what the matter was, Hanna replied,

Matter! Matter! Why, everybody's gone crazy! What is the matter with all of you? Here's this convention going headlong for Roosevelt for Vice President. Don't any of you realize that there's only one life between that madman and the Presidency? Platt and Quay are no better than idiots! What harm can he do as Governor of New York compared to the damage he will do as President if McKinley should die?

On his return to Washington after the convention nominated McKinley and Roosevelt, Hanna wrote to the President, "Well, it was a nice little scrap at Phila[delphia]. Not exactly to my liking with my hand tied behind me. However, we got through in good shape and the ticket is all right. Your duty to the country is to live for four years from next March."

The Democrats nominated Bryan a second time at their convention. This time, Bryan ran with a broader agenda, and attacked McKinley as an imperialist for taking the Spanish colonies. The Democratic candidate also urged increased use of the antitrust laws, and alleged that McKinley had been lax in their enforcement. Hanna summed up the Republican campaign in four words, "Let well enough alone."

Hanna was called upon to do only small amounts of fundraising this time: no great educational campaign was required, and the corporations were willing to give. The President gave only one speech, the formal acceptance of his nomination in Canton in July. Roosevelt, on the other hand, traveled widely across the nation giving speeches. The New Yorker traveled 21,000 miles (34,000 km) in the campaign, reaching 24 of the 45 states. Hanna was now a public figure, and wanted to campaign for the Republicans in the western states. McKinley, however, was reluctant, as Hanna had varied from the administration's position on trusts in a recent speech. McKinley sent Postmaster General Charles Emory Smith to Chicago, where Hanna then was, to talk him out of the trip. Hanna rapidly discerned that Smith had been sent by the President, and told him, "Return to Washington and tell the President that God hates a coward." McKinley and Hanna met in Canton several days later and settled their differences over lunch. Hanna made his speaking tour in the West. According to Hanna biographer Thomas Beer, Hanna's tour was a great success, though many viewers were surprised he did not wear suits decorated with the "dollar mark".

Hanna spent much of his time based at the campaign's New York office, while renting a seaside cottage in Elberon, New Jersey. In September, a strike by the United Mine Workers threatened a crisis which might cause problems for McKinley. Hanna believed that the miners' grievances were just, and he persuaded the parties to allow him to arbitrate. With Hanna's aid, the two sides arrived at a negotiated settlement.

On November 6, 1900, the voters re-elected McKinley, who took 51.7% of the popular vote, a slight increase from 1896. He won 292 electoral votes to Bryan's 155. McKinley took six states that Bryan had taken in 1896 while holding all the states he had won. Although the majority was not large by later standards, according to historian Lewis L. Gould in his study of the McKinley presidency, "in light of the election results since the Civil War, however, it was an impressive mandate."

==== Assassination of McKinley ====
McKinley traveled much during his presidency, and in September 1901, journeyed to the Pan-American Exposition in Buffalo, New York. On September 6, 1901, while receiving the public in the Temple of Music on the Exposition grounds, McKinley was shot by an anarchist, Leon Czolgosz. Hanna, along with many of the President's close allies, hurried to his bedside.

As the President lay, wounded, he enquired "Is Mark there?"; the doctors told him that Senator Hanna was present, but that he should not exert himself with an interview. McKinley appeared to be improving, and Hanna, with the doctors' reassurance, left Buffalo for an encampment of the Grand Army of the Republic in Cleveland, at which Hanna was to speak. While there, he received a telegram stating that the President had taken a turn for the worse, and hurried back to Buffalo. There he found an unconscious McKinley, whose sickbed had become a deathbed. On the evening of September 13, Hanna was allowed to see the dying man, as were others close to the President, such as his wife and his brother, Abner McKinley. Hanna, weeping, went to the library in the Milburn House where the President lay, and as he awaited the end, made the necessary plans and arrangements to return his friend's remains to Canton. At 2:15 am on September 14, President McKinley died.

=== Roosevelt years and death (1901–1904) ===
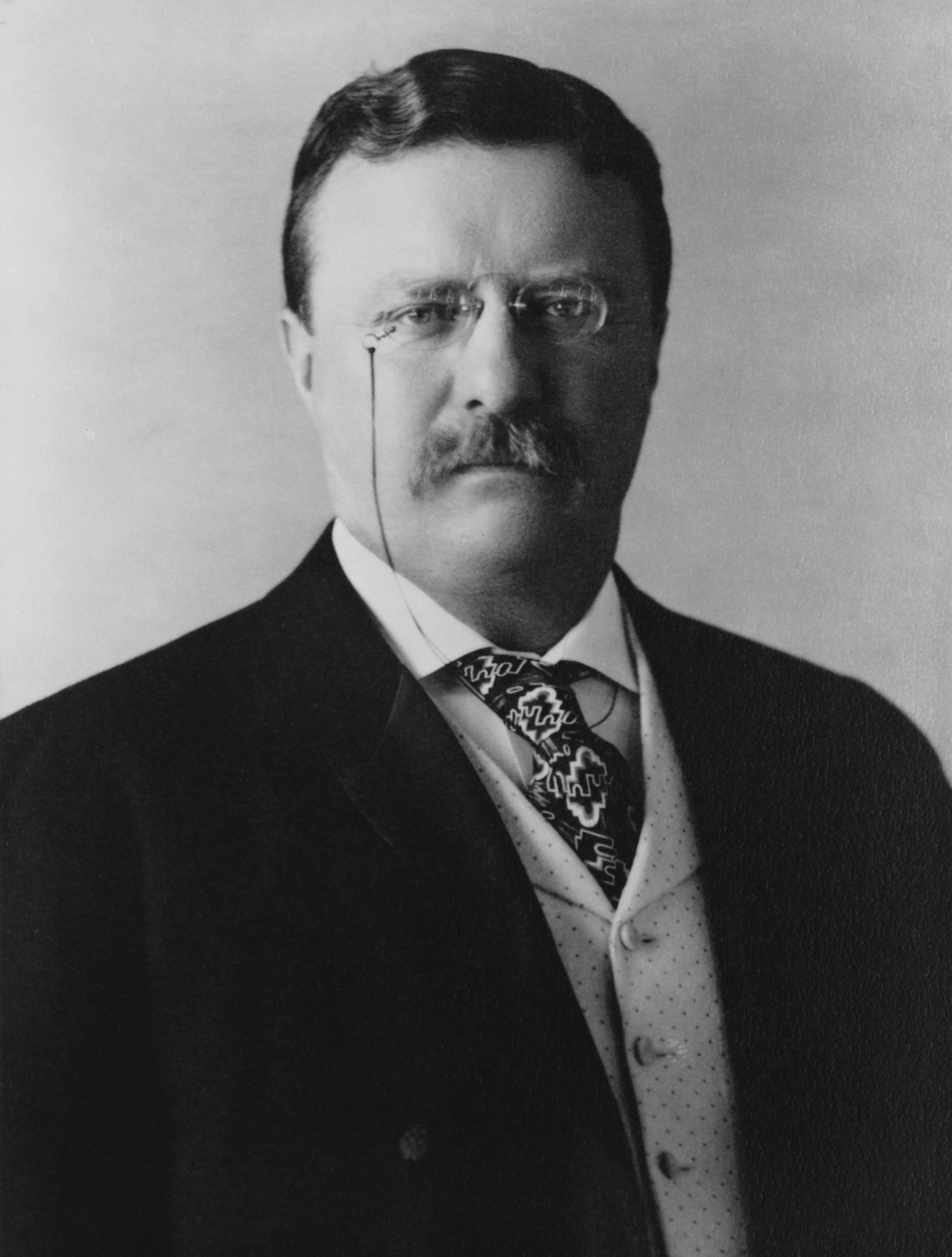
Theodore Roosevelt, President of the United States (1901–1909)

McKinley's death left Hanna devastated both personally and politically. Although the two had not been allies, the new president, Roosevelt, reached out to Hanna, hoping to secure his influence in the Senate. Hanna indicated that he was willing to come to terms with Roosevelt on two conditions: that Roosevelt carry out McKinley's political agenda, and that the President cease from his habit of calling Hanna "old man", something which greatly annoyed the senator. Hanna warned Roosevelt, "If you don't, I'll call you Teddy." Roosevelt, who despised his nickname, agreed to both terms, though he imperfectly carried out the second condition.

==== Panama Canal involvement ====
Hanna was a supporter of building a canal across Central America to allow ships to pass between the Atlantic and Pacific oceans without making the lengthy journey around Cape Horn. The senator believed a route across the Colombian province of Panama to be superior to its Nicaraguan rival. How he came to support this route is uncertain, though attorney and lobbyist William Nelson Cromwell later claimed to have personally converted Hanna to the Panama cause in 1901. This was disputed by the French canal promoter, Philippe Bunau-Varilla, who stated that at the end of his meeting with Hanna at the Arlington Hotel, the senator exclaimed, "Monsieur Bunau-Varilla, you have convinced me."

The Nicaragua route had many supporters and a bill sponsored by Iowa Congressman William Peters Hepburn, which would authorize the construction of a canal on the Nicaragua route, had passed the House of Representatives. In June 1902, it was considered by the Senate, and on June 5 and 6, Hanna made a speech against the Hepburn Bill. In his speech, he referred to enormous maps, which were displayed in the Senate Chamber as he spoke. This was a novel technique, especially as he referred to the possibility of active volcanoes on the Nicaragua route in his speech, and the maps showed active volcanoes marked with red dots and extinct ones with black. There was an almost continuous band of black dots through Nicaragua, with eight red ones; no dots were placed on the map of Panama. Hanna pointed out many advantages of the Panama route: it was shorter than the Nicaraguan route, would require much less digging, and had existing harbors at either end. Hanna was in poor health as he gave the speech; Alabama Senator John Tyler Morgan, the Senate sponsor of the Hepburn Bill, tried to ask Hanna a question, only to be met with, "I do not want to be interrupted, for I am very tired." At the end, Hanna warned that if the US built the Nicaragua canal, another power would finish the Panama route. One senator stated that he had been converted to the "Hannama Canal". The bill was amended to support a Panama route, according to some accounts in part because Cromwell remembered that Nicaragua depicted volcanoes on its postage stamps, and combed the stock of Washington stamp dealers until he found enough to send to the entire Senate. The House afterwards agreed to the Senate amendment, and the bill authorizing a Panama canal passed.

The US entered into negotiations with Colombia for rights to build a canal; a treaty was signed but was rejected by the Colombian Senate. In November 1903, Panama, with the support of the United States, broke away from Colombia, and Bunau-Varilla, the representative of the new government in Washington, signed a treaty granting the US a zone in which to build a canal. The United States Senate was called upon to ratify the treaty in February 1904; the debate began as Hanna lay dying. The treaty was ratified on February 23, 1904, eight days after Hanna's death.

==== Re-election, rumors of a presidential run, and death ====
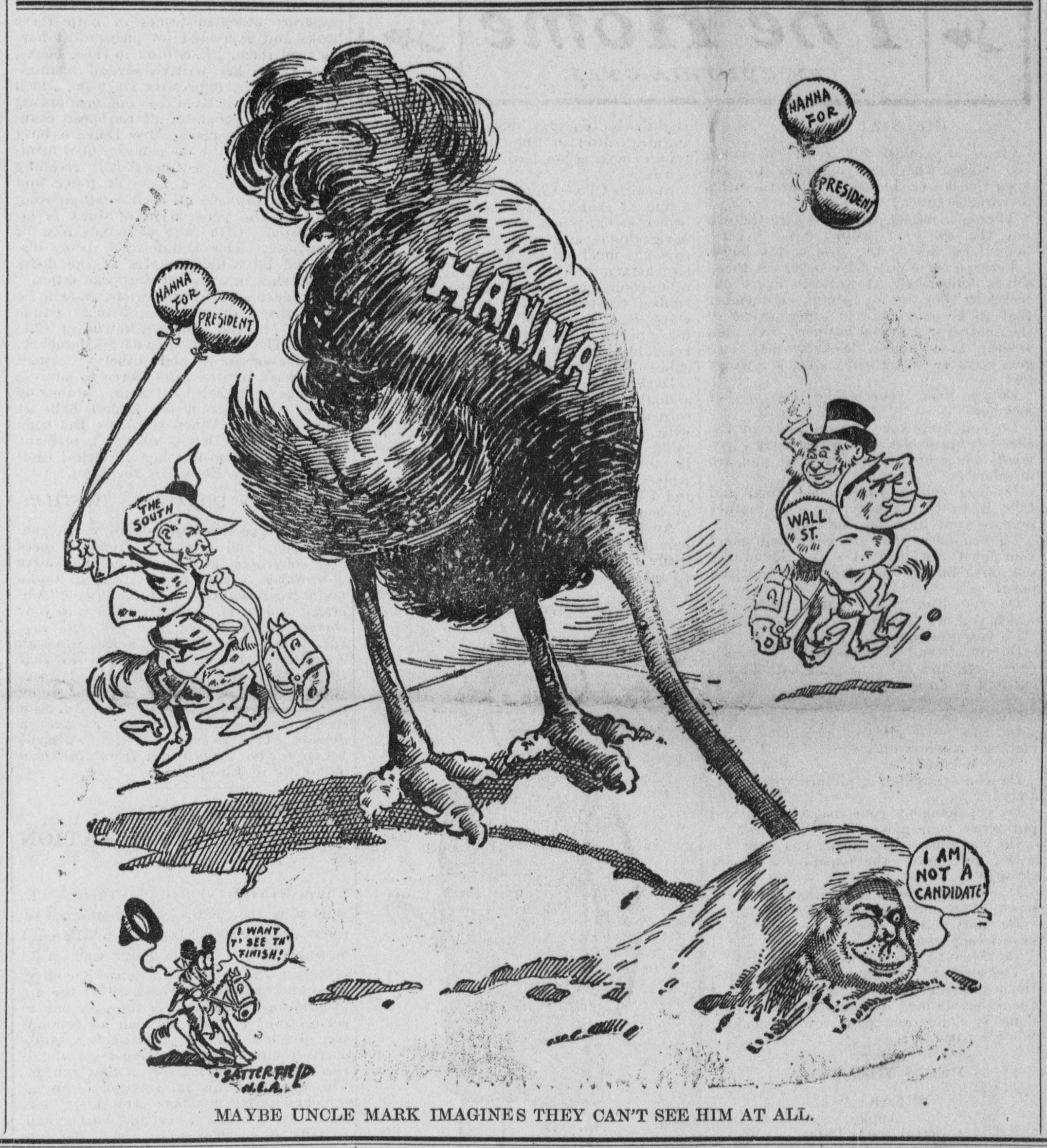
January 1904 political cartoon depicting Hanna hiding from presidential candidacy

At the 1903 Ohio Republican convention, Foraker filed a resolution to endorse Roosevelt for re-election. This would normally have been introduced at the 1904 convention, but Foraker hoped to use the resolution to take control of the Ohio party from Hanna. The resolution placed Hanna in a difficult position: if he supported it, he proclaimed he would not run for president; if he opposed it, he risked Roosevelt's wrath. Hanna wired Roosevelt, who was on a western trip, that he intended to oppose it and would explain all when both men were in Washington. Roosevelt responded that while he had not requested support from anyone, those friendly to his administration would naturally vote for such a statement. Hanna resignedly supported the resolution.

The 1903 convention also endorsed Hanna for re-election to the Senate, and nominated Hanna's friend Myron Herrick for governor. The Foraker faction was allowed the nomination for lieutenant governor, given to Warren G. Harding, who later became president. Hanna campaigned for several weeks for the Republicans in Ohio, and was rewarded with an overwhelming Republican victory. With no drama, Hanna was re-elected in January 1904 for the term 1905–1911 by a legislative vote of 115–25, a much larger margin than Foraker had received in 1902.

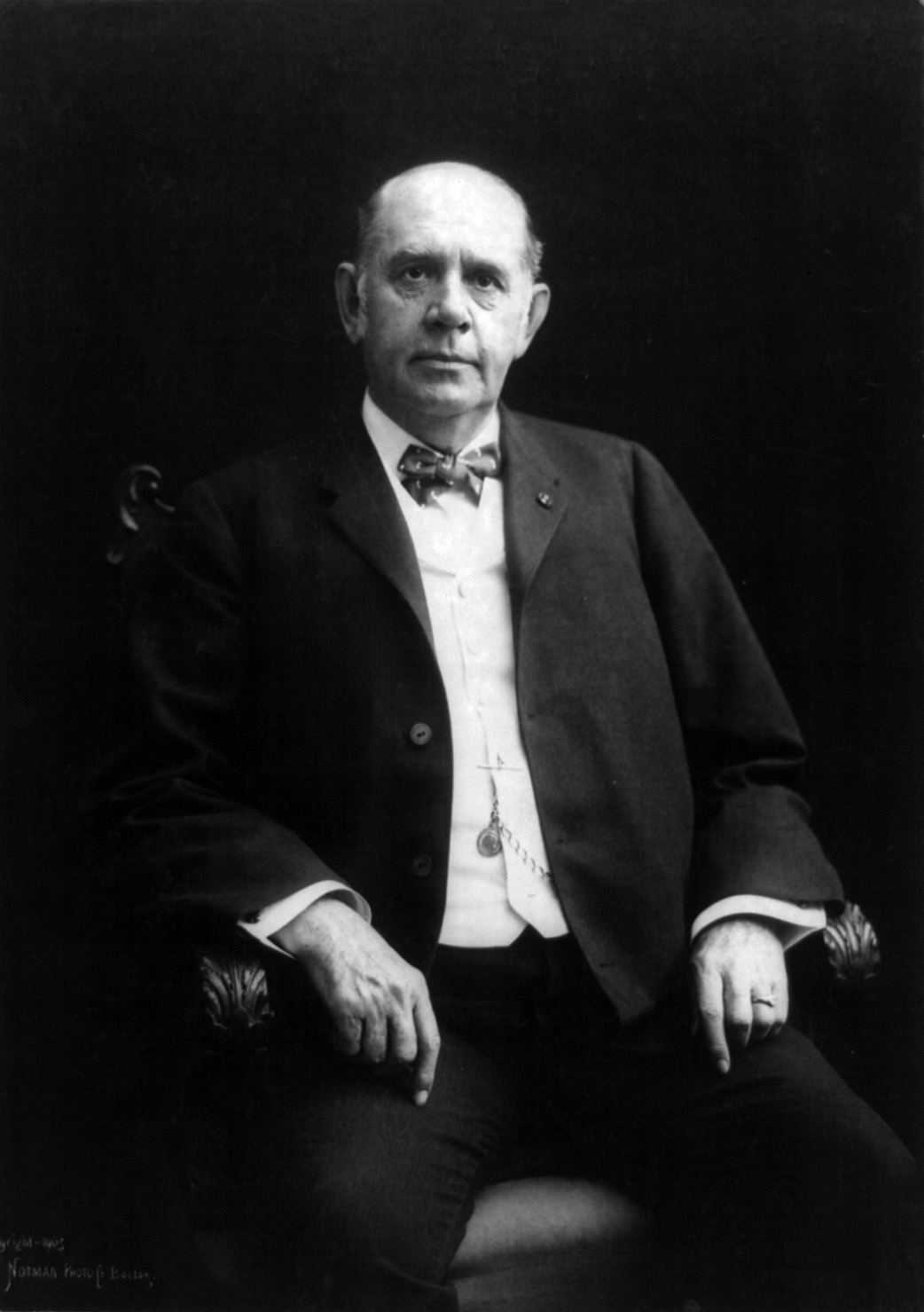
Hanna, c. 1903

Despite the differences between the two men, Roosevelt in November 1903 asked Hanna to run his re-election campaign. Hanna saw this as an unsubtle attempt by the President to ensure that Hanna would not oppose him, and was slow to respond to his request. In the interim, he allowed talk of a Hanna for president campaign to continue, although he did not plan to run. Financier J. P. Morgan, who disliked Roosevelt's policies, offered to finance the Hanna presidential campaign when he hosted the Hannas at Thanksgiving, though the senator remained silent at the offer. In December, Hanna and Roosevelt had a lengthy meeting and resolved many of their differences. Roosevelt agreed that Hanna would not have to serve another term as chairman of the Republican National Committee. This in theory freed Hanna to run for president, but Roosevelt could see that Hanna was an exhausted man and would not run.

On January 30, 1904, Hanna attended the Gridiron Club dinner at the Arlington Hotel. He neither ate nor drank, and when asked how his health was, responded "Not good." He never again left his Washington residence, having fallen ill with typhoid fever. As the days passed, politicians began to wait in the Arlington lobby, close to Hanna's house, for news; a letter from the President, "May you soon be with us, old fellow, as strong in body and as vigorous in your leadership as ever" was never read by the recipient. Hanna drifted in and out of consciousness for several days; on the morning of February 15, his heart began to fail. Roosevelt visited at 3 pm, unseen by the dying man. At 6:30 pm, Senator Hanna died, and the crowd of congressional colleagues, government officials, and diplomats who had gathered in the lobby of the Arlington left the hotel, many sobbing. Roosevelt biographer Edmund Morris noted Hanna's achievement in industry and in politics, "He had not done badly in either field; he had made seven million dollars, and a President of the United States."

== Views and legacy ==
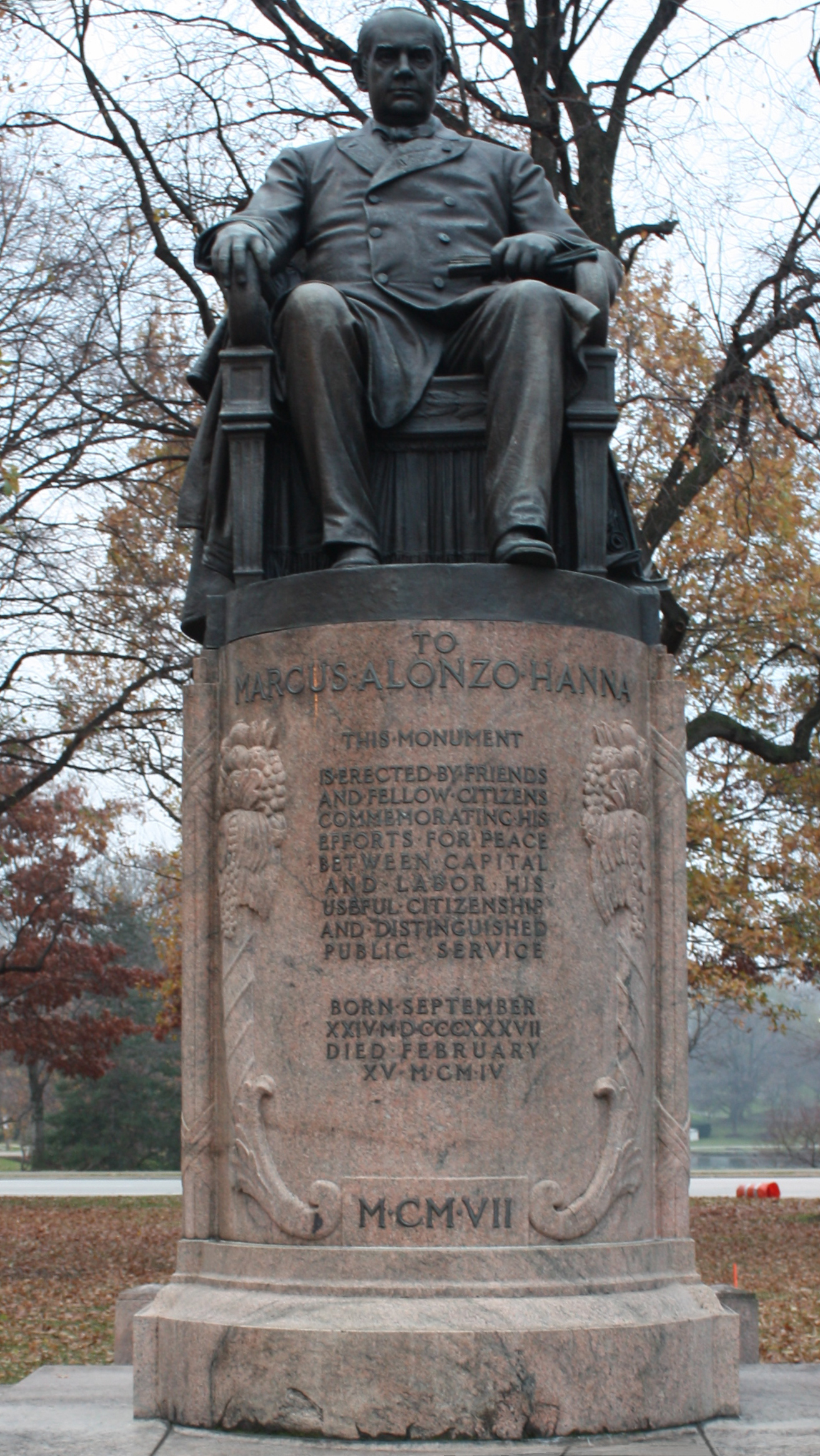
Statue of Mark Hanna by Augustus Saint-Gaudens, University Circle, Cleveland

According to Professor Gerald W. Wolff, "the one solid absolute in [Hanna's] life was a profound belief in the living standard capitalism had brought to America." Hanna believed, like many conservative businessmen of his time, that labor, business, and government should work together cooperatively for the benefit of society. These views, which had coalesced in Hanna by the 1876 coal strike, informed his political views once he turned to that field. According to Croly, Hanna always did his best to foster good relations with his workers; the biographer proffered in support of his statement a quote from the Cleveland Leader of April 28, 1876: "This morning Mr. Hanna, of Rhodes & Co., met the striking laborers on the docks at Ashtabula Harbor, and after consultation the men accepted the terms offered and resumed work." According to Wolff, after the coal strike, Hanna "tried diligently to show by example how relations between labor, capital, and management could be ordered for the benefit of all".

Despite his efforts at harmonious worker relations, Hanna was often depicted by Davenport during the 1896 campaign with his foot on a skull labeled "Labor". During the following year's Ohio legislative elections, which determined Hanna's electors for his 1898 re-election bid, he was accused of being harsh to his employees. He responded in a speech,

Go to any of the five thousand men in my employ ... Ask them whether I ever pay less than the highest going wages, ask them whether I ever asked them whether they belonged to a union or not ... Ask them whether, when any men or any committee of men, came to me with a complaint if I ever refused to see them ... Ask them if I ever in my life intentionally wronged any workingman. I never did.

After Hanna issued the challenge, unions representing his workers confirmed his statement. Hanna became the first president of the National Civic Federation (NCF), which tried to foster harmonious relations between business and labor. The NCF opposed militant labor unions; it also resisted businessmen who sought to entirely prevent regulation. It recognized labor's right to organize to seek better wages and conditions. In a 1903 speech to a labor convention, Hanna stated that the efforts of labor to organize into unions should be considered no more shocking than those of businesses organizing into trade groups.

A phrase sometimes attributed to Hanna is: "No man in public office owes the public anything". This phrase supposedly appeared in a letter by Hanna to Ohio Attorney General David K. Watson in 1890, urging him to drop a lawsuit against the Standard Oil Company. The phrase became an issue against Hanna in the 1897 campaign in Ohio. Watson, a Republican, denied that Hanna had written the phrase, but refused to discuss the matter further with reporters. Hanna's early biographers, Croly and Beer, found the supposed quote dubious but as they did not definitely deny that Hanna had written it, a number of later works attribute the quote to Hanna. However, Professor Thomas E. Felt, who wrote an article about the controversy, believed Hanna unlikely to use such an inflammatory phrase to a man with whom he was not close, and which, in any event, did not accurately represent his political views.

Hanna is often credited with the invention of the modern presidential campaign. His campaign for McKinley in 1896 broke new ground because of its highly systematized and centralized nature, as well as for its fundraising success. Although Hanna has been depicted as the first national political boss, historians agree that McKinley dominated the relationship between the two. Nevertheless, Hanna is recognized for his innovative campaign work.

== Posthumous public image ==
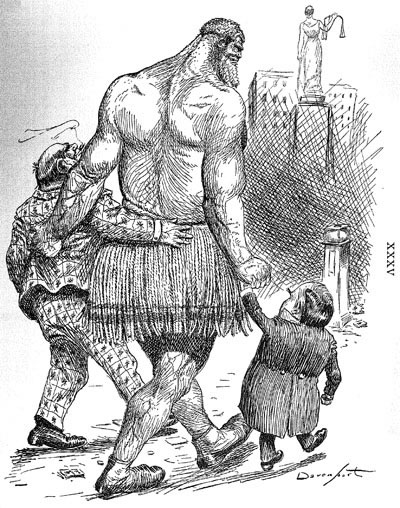
"As they go to the polls" 1900 Homer Davenport cartoon suggesting a cozy relationship among Hanna, McKinley, and the trusts.

New Jersey Senator Bill Bradley published a volume of memoirs, Time Present, Time Past in 1996. In it, the Democrat mentioned having written a high-school report on Hanna—his history teacher, Bradley related, told him that the lesson of the 1896 campaign is that money is power. Bradley, a former basketball player, mentioned that when he was being interviewed in high school, he stated that Hanna was one of his heroes. By the time he wrote the book, however, Bradley had come to believe in limits on campaign spending and blamed Hanna for a sharp escalation in campaign costs. Bradley also stated what Horner terms mischaracterizations of Hanna: that he was the Republican boss of Ohio, and that he did his best to disrupt Roosevelt's presidency. Bradley alleged that since 1896, Republicans have raised money easily from the rich. Despite his condemnation of Hanna, Bradley wrote that he regretted that he could not find a Hanna-like figure who could play an analogous role in advancing his political career.

In 2000, Texas Governor George W. Bush successfully ran for the presidency. As the campaign progressed, the media compared Hanna and Bush adviser Karl Rove, who was believed by some to hold a Svengali-like influence over the Texas governor. During the campaign, and until his departure from the White House in 2007, media members often suggested that Rove was able to manipulate Bush, and that Rove exerted considerable control over the government. Bush's advisor was deemed a present-day incarnation of Hanna, who was almost invariably presented negatively and at variance with historical fact. For example, writer Jack Kelly in a 2000 column incorrectly stated that McKinley's front porch campaign was at the direction of Hanna to ensure the candidate did not vary from campaign themes, rather than McKinley deciding that it was his best response to Bryan's national tour. These comparisons were fuelled by Rove's interest in, and from some reports, liking for Hanna. Rove studied the McKinley administration at the University of Texas under McKinley biographer Lewis L. Gould, and believes that Hanna's influence has been overstated.

According to Horner, Davenport's depiction of Hanna still lingers in 2010 as the modern image of the former senator:

The portrait of Hanna that has stood the test of time is of a man who was grossly obese; a cutthroat attack dog for the "Trusts"; a cigar-smoking man clad in a suit covered with dollar signs who stood side by side with a gigantic figure representing the trusts, and a tiny, childlike William McKinley. He will forever be known as "Dollar Mark".

== Family ==
On September 27, 1864, Hanna married Charlotte Augusta Rhodes (1843 - 1921). Through her father Daniel Rhodes, she was related to US Senator Stephen A. Douglas. Hanna's brothers-in-law were industrialist and historian James Ford Rhodes, who won a Pulitzer Prize; and Col. James Pickands, a cofounder of Pickands Mather & Company. His cousin Edith Hanna married William Yale of the Yale family, who was a spy for Standard Oil of the Rockefellers, and a companion of Lawrence of Arabia. His nephew, Thomas B. Yale, was an OSS spy during World War II and became Director of Finance of the CIA under George H. W. Bush. He was involved in Project Azorian with Howard Hughes.

The couple had three children:

- Daniel Rhodes Hanna, born Dec. 27, 1866, married to Daisy Gordon, and secondly to May Harrington. He owned Cleveland News and The Cleveland Leader.
- Mabel A. Hanna, born June 13, 1871, married Harry Parsons, the personal assistant of her father. They lived in a mansion in Clifton Park.
- Ruth Hanna, born March 27, 1880, married to Congressman Albert G. Simms. She became a congresswoman and political activist.

== Electoral history ==
All elections are by the Ohio General Assembly, as state legislatures elected senators until the ratification of the 17th Amendment in 1913.

Election	Political result	Candidate	Party	Votes	%	±%
United States Senate special election in Ohio, 1898; January 12, 1898. Special election necessary because of the resignation of John Sherman to become United States Secretary of State, March 4, 1897. Governor Asa Bushnell appointed Mark Hanna as senator, March 5, 1897, pending a meeting of the Ohio legislature. Hanna was elected on the first joint convention vote (73 votes needed for election). "Short term" election, to expire March 4, 1899. See note to the long-term vote in next box for additional information as the votes on both elections were identical.	Republican hold	Mark Hanna	Republican	73	50.69	
	Republican hold	Robert McKisson	Republican	70	48.61	
	Republican hold	John J. Lentz	Democratic	1	0.69	
United States Senate election in Ohio, 1898; January 12, 1898; "Long term" election, from March 4, 1899, for six years. Each house met on January 11 to vote on both the short and long term Senate elections; if both houses gave the same individual a majority vote in either contest, no vote in joint convention would be necessary. Instead, the individual would be declared elected for that term after the journals of each house were read in the joint convention. Otherwise, a roll-call vote would take place. A total of 73 votes were needed for election; Hanna was elected on the first joint convention ballot. The results on the 11th were, in the Ohio House of Representatives: Hanna 56, McKisson 49, Lentz 1, Aquila Wiley 1, Adoniram J. Warner 1. In the Ohio Senate, McKisson 19, Hanna 17. As the two houses did not give the same individual a majority in both, this required a roll-call vote in the joint convention of the two houses. The results were those at right, broken down: House, Hanna 56, McKisson 51, Lentz 1; Senate, McKisson 19, Hanna 17. Vote totals were the same for both the short and long term.	Republican hold	Mark Hanna	Republican	73	50.69	
	Republican hold	Robert McKisson	Republican	70	48.61	
	Republican hold	John J. Lentz	Democratic	1	0.69	
United States Senate election in Ohio, 1904; January 13, 1904. From March 4, 1905, for six years. Each house met on January 12 and gave a majority of its vote to Hanna. He was declared elected in joint convention following the reading of the journals; 71 votes needed for election. The breakdown was: House, Hanna 86, Clarke 21; Senate, Hanna 29, Clarke 4. Hanna died before this term commenced. U.S. Congressman Charles W. F. Dick of Akron, Ohio was elected by the legislature on March 2, 1904, for the remainder of the term ending in 1905, and for the full term ending in 1911.	Republican hold	Mark Hanna	Republican	115	82.14	
	Republican hold	John H. Clarke	Democratic	25	17.86	

U.S. Senate
Preceded by John Sherman	U.S. Senator (Class 1) from Ohio; 1897–1904; Served alongside: Joseph B. Foraker	Succeeded by Charles W. F. Dick
Preceded by John Spooner	Chair of the Senate Canadian Relations Committee; 1899–1901	Succeeded by John F. Dryden
Preceded by John Morgan	Chair of the Senate Interoceanic Canals Committee; 1903–1905	Succeeded by John H. Mitchell
Party political offices
Preceded by Thomas H. Carter	Chair of the Republican National Committee; 1896–1904	Succeeded by Henry Payne; Acting
