= Clifton Park (Lakewood, Ohio) =

Neighborhood in Lakewood, Ohio, US

- Neighborhood
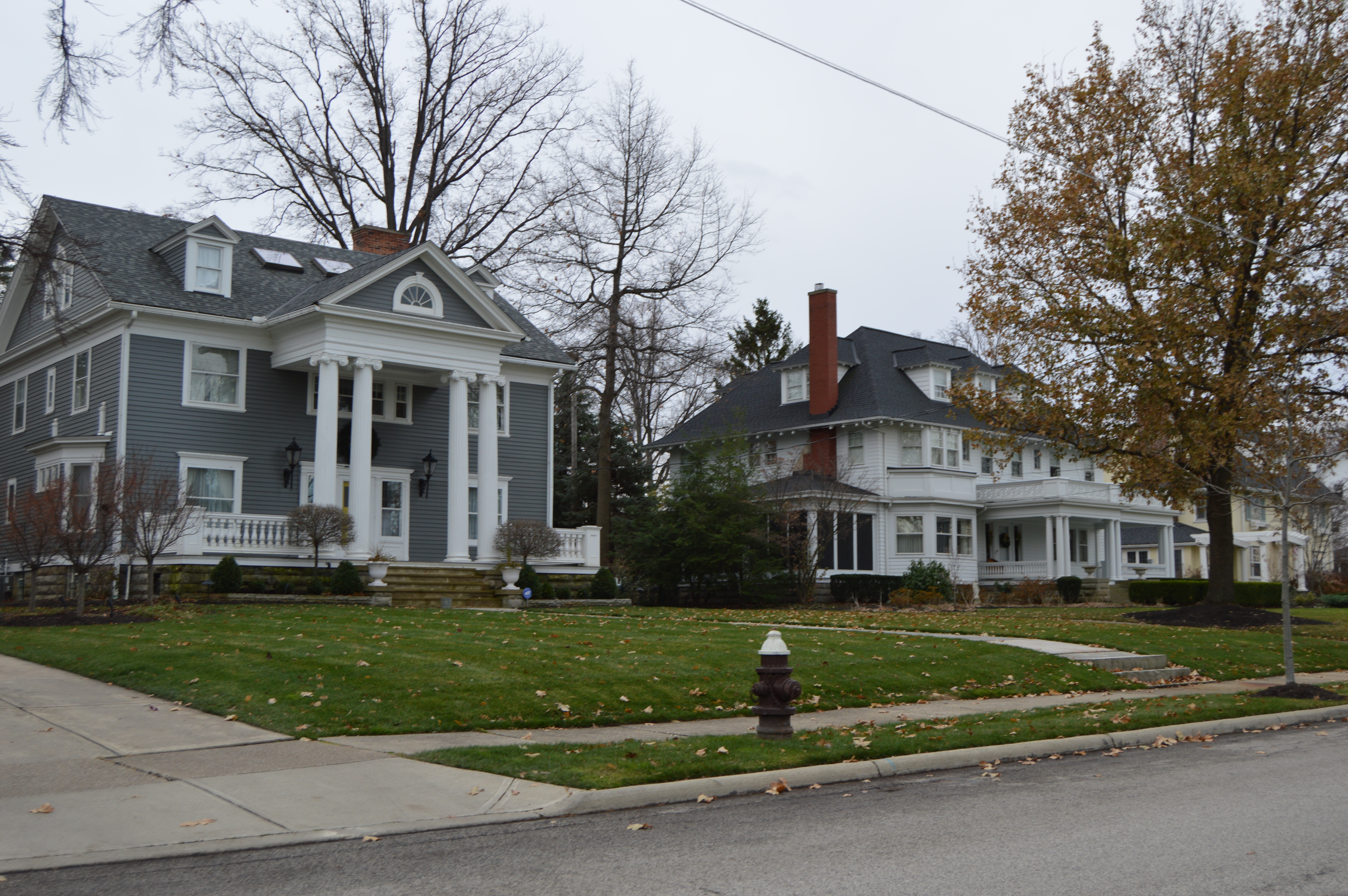
- Houses on the southern side of Lake Road, west of the Clifton Road intersection.

- Lakewood within Ohio,

- Clifton Park relative to Cleveland, Ohio.
- Coordinates: 41°29′20″N 81°49′43″W
- Country: United States
- State: Ohio
- County: Cuyahoga
- City: Lakewood

Clifton Park is a neighborhood located in the northwestern corner of Lakewood, Ohio. This assortment of about 250 homes hosts many affluent families who have access to the private Clifton Beach through their geographic location in Clifton Park. Known for its tangle of winding streets, the neighborhood differs from the grid pattern found throughout the city of Lakewood.

The northern section of Clifton Park was listed on the National Register of Historic Places in 1974. The southern section was listed on the National Register of Historic Places in 2021.

Mabel A. Hanna, born June 13, 1871, daughter of Mark Hanna, married to Harry Parsons, the personal assistant of her father, lived in a mansion in Clifton Park.
